= Miss Teen USA 2022 =

40th edition of the Miss Teen USA competition

- Date: October 1, 2022
- Presenters: Elle Smith; Christian Murphy
- Venue: Grand Sierra Resort, Reno, Nevada, United States
- Broadcaster: YouTube
- Entrants: 51
- Placements: 16
- Winner: Faron Medhi; Nebraska
- Congeniality: Janae McIntosh (Nevada)
- Photogenic: Gabriela Ortega (North Carolina)

Miss Teen USA 2022 was the 40th Miss Teen USA pageant, held at the Grand Sierra Resort in Reno, Nevada, United States, on October 1, 2022.

Breanna Myles of Florida crowned Faron Medhi of Nebraska as her successor at the end of the event.

== Background ==
=== Location ===
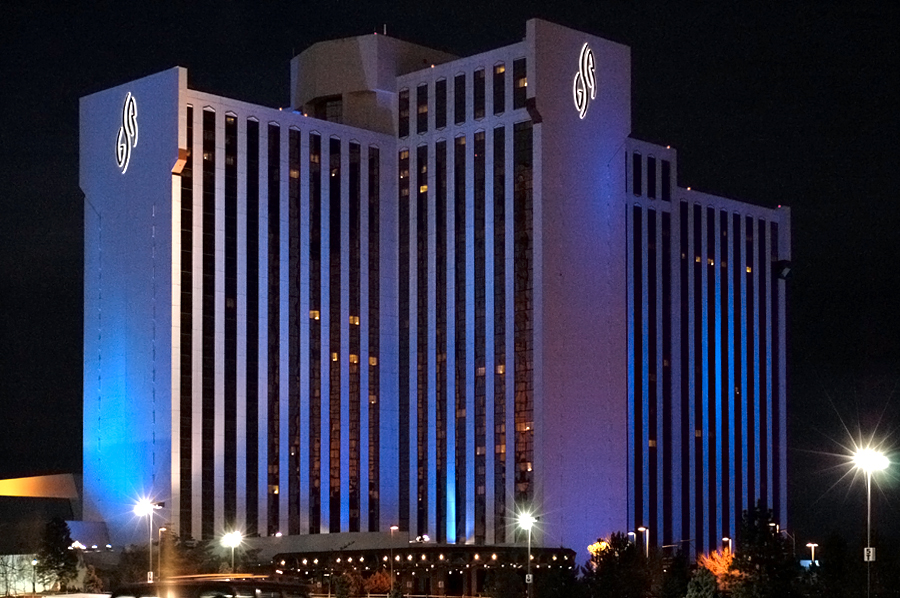
Grand Sierra Resort in Reno, Nevada, the host venue of the Miss Teen USA 2022 competition

On July 14, 2022, it was reported that the competition, including Miss USA 2022, would be held in Reno, Nevada, with the city securing a three-year deal to host the pageants in 2022, 2023, and 2024. This will be the second time that the pageant is held in Reno, following Miss Teen USA 2019. The following day, it was confirmed that the pageant would be held at the Grand Sierra Resort on October 1 by Crystle Stewart who confirmed that the location was chosen to honor Cheslie Kryst, whom had been crowned Miss USA 2019 in the same venue and had died by suicide in January 2022.

=== Selection of contestants ===
The COVID-19 pandemic impacted the duration between most of the state pageants from the previous year's competition, with previous year's state titleholders' reign being shortened to eight to eleven months, depending on state. Delegates from the 50 states and the District of Columbia are selected in state pageants which began in September 2021 and ended in July 2022, as the state pageant schedule can become very dense between the last state pageant held from 2021. The first state pageants were Idaho and Montana, held together on September 12, 2021, and the last state pageant was Colorado held on July 3, 2022.

== Results ==
=== Placements ===
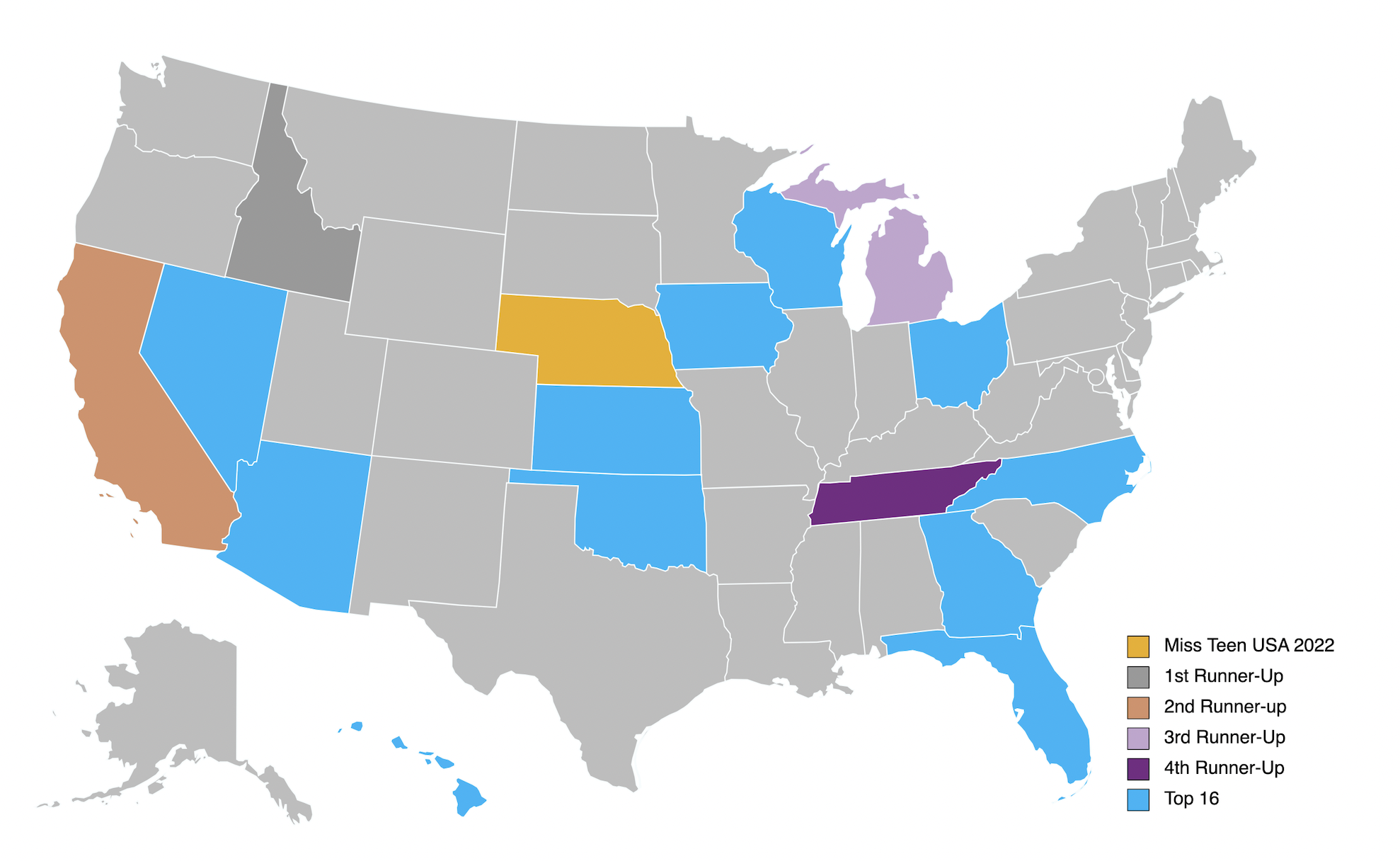
Miss Teen USA 2022 results.

Placement	Contestant
Miss Teen USA 2022	Nebraska – Faron Medhi
1st Runner-Up	Idaho – Jenna Beckstrom
2nd Runner-Up	California – Cassidy Hill
3rd Runner-Up	Michigan – Isabella Mosqueda
4th Runner-Up	Tennessee – McKinley Farese
Top 16	Arizona – MayaDenise Gaskin; Florida – Alyssa Khan; Georgia – Courtney Ianna Smith; Hawaii – Malulani Paiste; Iowa – Marisa Mathson; Kansas – Gracie Hendrickson; Nevada – Janae McIntosh; North Carolina – Gabriela Ortega; Ohio – Kylan Darnell §; Oklahoma – Haleigh Hurst; Wisconsin – Sage Gundelly

§ – Voted into Top 16 through the online vote.

=== Special awards ===
Award		Contestant	Ref.
Best State Costume	Winner	Oklahoma – Haleigh Hurst	
Best State Costume	Second Place	North Carolina – Gabriela Ortega	
Best State Costume	Third Place	Wisconsin – Sage Gundelly	
Miss Congeniality		Nevada – Janae McIntosh	
Miss Photogenic		North Carolina – Gabriela Ortega	

Order of Announcements

Top 16

1. Arizona
2. Florida
3. Kansas
4. Nevada
5. Iowa
6. Ohio
7. Georgia
8. Wisconsin
9. North Carolina
10. Hawaii
11. California
12. Michigan
13. Nebraska
14. Idaho
15. Tennessee
16. Oklahoma

Top 5

1. California
2. Tennessee
3. Michigan
4. Idaho
5. Nebraska

== Pageant ==
=== Judges ===
- Allan Aponte – Puerto Rican makeup artist
- Kaliegh Garris – Miss Teen USA 2019 from Connecticut
- Bob Hartnagel – American public affairs consultant
- Anita Krpata – American businesswoman and chief commercial officer (CCO) of SeneGence
- Tanya Memme – Canadian television host and Miss World Canada 1993
- Keylee Sanders Helmich – Miss Teen USA 1995 from Kansas

== Contestants ==
All 51 titleholders have been crowned.

State	Contestant	Age (Note: Ages at the time of the pageant)	Hometown	Placement	Notes
Alabama	AnnaLee Story	19	Auburn		
Alaska	Madison Hines	17	Eagle River		
Arizona	MayaDenise Gaskin	18	Phoenix	Top 16	Previously Miss Arizona Collegiate America 2021
Arkansas	Allie Shanks	17	Springdale		
California	Cassidy Hill	18	Newport Beach	2nd Runner-Up	
Colorado	Chloe Fisher	18	Sterling		
Connecticut	Mya Xeller	18	New Haven		
Delaware	Ava MacMurray	18	Hockessin		
District of Columbia	Asia Hickman	19	Washington, D.C.		Previously Miss New York's Outstanding Teen 2017
Florida	Alyssa Khan	19	Cooper City	Top 16	
Georgia	Courtney Ianna Smith	16	Atlanta	Top 16	
Hawaii	Malulani Paiste	19	Mililani	Top 16	
Idaho	Jenna Beckstrom	18	Eagle	1st Runner-Up	
Illinois	Dawn Parks	19	Chicago		
Indiana	KK Kokonaing	18	Huntertown		
Iowa	Marisa Mathson	17	Des Moines	Top 16	
Kansas	Gracie Hendrickson	17	Newton	Top 16	Previously Miss Kansas' Outstanding Teen 2021
Kentucky	Gabriella Hembree	19	Carrollton		
Louisiana	Ainsley Ross	19	Bossier City		
Maine	Madisson Higgins	16	Bangor		
Maryland	Soniya Krishan	19	Wheaton		
Massachusetts	Jillian Driscoll	18	Lynnfield		Daughter of Jacquelyn Doucette Driscoll, Miss Massachusetts USA 1996.
Michigan	Isabella Mosqueda	19	Cedar Springs	3rd Runner-Up	
Minnesota	Ava Ernst	17	North Oaks		Previously Miss Minnesota High School America 2021
Mississippi	McKenzie Cole	16	Vicksburg		Later Miss Mississippi USA 2025
Missouri	Shae Smith	19	Bolivar		Previously Miss Missouri's Outstanding Teen 2019 and later Miss Missouri USA 2025
Montana	Julia Kunau	16	Lewistown		
Nebraska	Faron Medhi	18	Omaha	Miss Teen USA 2022	
Nevada	Janae McIntosh	18	Las Vegas	Top 16	
New Hampshire	Grace Paradise	18	Plaistow		
New Jersey	Isabella Galan	17	Wayne		
New Mexico	Caroline Babcock	17	Farmington		
New York	Mahdiya Chowdhury	17	New York City		
North Carolina	Gabriela Ortega	17	Cary	Top 16	
North Dakota	Berkley Lundeen	18	Minot		Cousin of Caitlyn Vogel, Miss North Dakota Teen USA 2019 and Miss North Dakota USA 2021
Ohio	Kylan Darnell	18	Franklin Furnace	Top 16	
Oklahoma	Haleigh Hurst	19	Norman	Top 16	
Oregon	Alaina McClanen-Clemons	18	Portland		
Pennsylvania	Alexandra Jones	18	Monongahela		
Rhode Island	Julia Potts	18	Charlestown		
South Carolina	Katie Ward	19	Charleston		
South Dakota	Bella Welker	17	Harrisburg		
Tennessee	McKinley Farese	18	Germantown	4th Runner-Up	Previously Miss Kentucky Junior High School America 2017, Miss Tennessee Junior High School America 2018
Texas	Chanel Williams	16	San Antonio		
Utah	Maizy Abbott	19	Pleasant View		
Vermont	Kenzie Golonka	17	Montpelier		Sister of Kelsey Golonka, Miss Vermont Teen USA 2017 and Miss Vermont USA 2022
Virginia	Hannah Grau	17	Fredericksburg		
Washington	Kate Dixon	18	Sammamish		Shortly after being crowned, a video of Dixon saying the N-word surfaced causing a controversy. Pageant organizers allowed Dixon to begin her reign.
West Virginia	Emma Kitchen	18	Williamstown		
Wisconsin	Sage Gundelly	15	Mequon	Top 16	Sister of Shreya Gundelly, Miss Wisconsin Teen USA 2021
Wyoming	Nora Steinke	17	Laramie		Cousin of Erin Shae Swanson, Miss Nebraska Teen USA 2019
