= Miss Teen USA 2023 =

41st edition of the Miss USA competition

- Date: September 28, 2023 (Note: Airing on September 29, the same day as Miss USA 2023)
- Presenters: Keltie Knight; Adrienne Bailon-Houghton; Nia Sanchez; Chris Persky; Faron Medhi
- Venue: Grand Sierra Resort, Reno, Nevada
- Broadcaster: The CW (website and app only)
- Entrants: 51
- Placements: 20
- Winner: UmaSofia Srivastava (resigned); New Jersey
- Congeniality: Asia Rose Simpson; New Mexico
- Best State Costume: UmaSofia Srivastava; New Jersey
- Photogenic: Carolina Sola; Ohio

Miss Teen USA 2023 was the 41st Miss Teen USA pageant, held on September 28, 2023 at the Grand Sierra Resort in Reno, Nevada. Faron Medhi of Nebraska crowned UmaSofia Srivastava of New Jersey as her successor at the end of the event. Her win was the first win for New Jersey and the first back-to-back titleholders with Indian ancestry in Miss Teen USA's history. Srivastava resigned the title on May 7, 2024. Following Srivastava's resignation, first runner-up Stephanie Skinner declined to take over the role, leaving the position vacant.

This was the first edition of the pageant to be held under the ownership of fashion designer Laylah Rose and was streamed on The CW website and mobile app.

== Background ==
=== Location ===
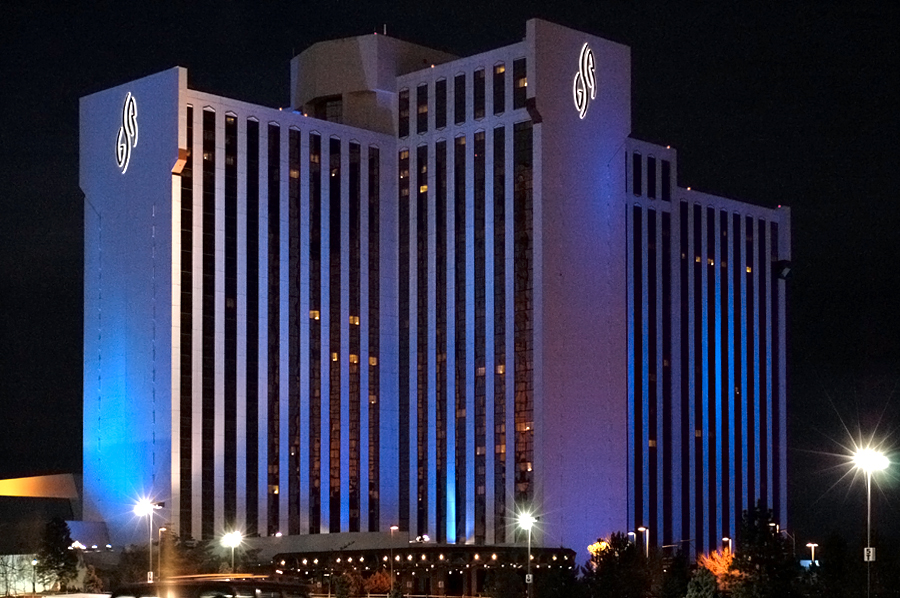
Grand Sierra Resort in Reno, Nevada, the venue of the Miss USA 2023 competition

On July 14, 2022, it was reported that the competition would be held in Reno, Nevada, with the city securing a three-year deal to host the pageant from 2022 to 2024. This will be the third time that the pageant is held in Reno, and a second consecutive year holding the pageant in the city, following Miss USA 2019 and 2022. Former Miss USA organization president Crystle Stewart said the location was chosen to honor Cheslie Kryst, who had been crowned Miss USA 2019 in the same venue and had died of suicide in January 2022.

== Pageant ==
=== Preliminary competition ===
The delayed telecast of the 2023 Miss Teen USA preliminary competition was broadcast via Miss USA's official YouTube page on September 28 at 7 p.m. Las Vegas time.

=== Judges ===
- Katie Cazorla – TV personality, entrepreneur, stand-up comedian
- Tabitha Swatosh – Influencer
- Emily Shah – Actress, producer, entrepreneur, Miss New Jersey USA 2014
- Mindy Mahy – Founder of Kopu Water
- Ruth Zakarian – Miss Teen USA 1983 from New York

== Results ==
=== Placements ===
Placement	Contestant
Miss Teen USA 2023	New Jersey – UmaSofia Srivastava (resigned)
1st Runner-Up	New York – Stephanie Skinner
2nd Runner-Up	Pennsylvania – Maggie Ross
3rd Runner-Up	Texas – Haylee Puckett
4th Runner-Up	Ohio – Carolina Sola
Top 20	California – Taliya Peiris; District of Columbia – Asia Chisley; Georgia – Denim Lovett; Illinois – Vivica Lewandowski; Iowa – Madeline Erickson; Missouri – Madison Beck; North Dakota – Morgan Schwindt; Oklahoma – Jaselyn Rossman; Rhode Island – Lola Paolissi §; South Carolina – Kenlee McVay; Tennessee – Blye Allen; Utah – Jocelyn Osmond; Virginia – Ashley Wang; Washington – Mackenzie Kuiken; Wisconsin – Shelby Hohneke

§ – Voted into Top 20 through the online vote.

== Contestants ==
51 titleholders competed for the title.

State	Contestant	Age (Note: Ages at the time of the pageant)	Hometown	Placement	Notes
Alabama	Kensey Collins	15	Spanish Fort		
Alaska	Star Hunter	16	Anchorage		
Arizona	Peyton Stuewe	18	Goodyear		
Arkansas	Mackenzie Scott	19	Fayetteville		
California	Taliya Peiris	18	San Ramon	Top 20	
Colorado	Grace Covney	19	Highlands Ranch		
Connecticut	Jade Ferdinand	19	Stamford		
Delaware	Molly Lavelle	19	Wilmington		
District of Columbia	Asia Chisley	17	Washington, DC	Top 20	
Florida	Sharlysse Nelson	15	Destin		
Georgia	Denim Lovett	19	Bonaire	Top 20	
Hawaii	NoeLani Denisi	18	Kahului		
Idaho	Angelina Ryan	18	Boise		
Illinois	Vivica Lewandowski	18	Barrington	Top 20	Later Miss Illinois USA 2026
Indiana	Kinley Shoemaker	18	Franklin		
Iowa	Madeline Erickson	19	Ankeny	Top 20	Later Miss Iowa USA 2026
Kansas	Riley Steinman	19	Shawnee		
Kentucky	MeShyia Bradshaw	17	Elizabethtown		
Louisiana	Averi Blyss Crawford	17	Baton Rouge		
Maine	Jasmine Roy	17	Bangor		
Maryland	Madelyn Posey	17	Newburg		
Massachusetts	Yanelyn Quintana	17	Haverhill		
Michigan	Avery Hill	16	Farmington Hills		
Minnesota	Mikhala Rivers	17	Maple Grove		
Mississippi	Claire Ulmer	18	Natchez		
Missouri	Madison Beck	18	Barnhart	Top 20	Later Miss Missouri USA 2026
Montana	Ava Williams	18	Billings		
Nebraska	Aubrie Charter	18	North Platte		
Nevada	Emily Cox	18	Las Vegas		
New Hampshire	Marayssa Raimondo	18	Dover		
New Jersey	UmaSofia Srivastava	16	Morris Plains	Miss Teen USA 2023	
New Mexico	Asia Rose Simpson	15	Hobbs		Later Miss World Philippines 2026
New York	Stephanie Skinner	19	Syracuse	1st Runner-up	Formerly Miss High School America 2021 Later Miss Pennsylvania 2026
North Carolina	Katie Setzer	18	Hickory		
North Dakota	Morgan Schwindt	19	Fargo	Top 20	
Ohio	Carolina Sola	17	Gallipolis	4th Runner-up	
Oklahoma	Jaselyn Rossman	19	Sapulpa	Top 20	
Oregon	Isabella Ellsworth	18	Happy Valley		
Pennsylvania	Maggie Ross	19	Pittsburgh	2nd Runner-up	
Rhode Island	Lola Paolissi	16	Cranston	Top 20	
South Carolina	Kenlee McVay	19	Easley	Top 20	
South Dakota	Lindsey Pfingston	18	Rapid City		
Tennessee	Blye Allen	17	Knoxville	Top 20	
Texas	Haylee Puckett	16	Houston	3rd Runner-up	
Utah	Jocelyn Osmond	16	Alpine	Top 20	
Vermont	Nadja Dacres	16	Colchester		
Virginia	Ashley Wang	16	Herndon	Top 20	
Washington	Mackenzie Kuiken	16	South Bend	Top 20	
West Virginia	Lakyn Campbell	18	Parkersburg		
Wisconsin	Shelby Hohneke	19	Hudson	Top 20	
Wyoming	Victoria Salas	19	Evanston		
