= Miss Michigan Teen USA =

Beauty pageant competition

- Formation: 1983
- Type: Beauty pageant
- Headquarters: Cincinnati
- Location: Ohio
- Members: Miss Teen USA
- Official language: English
- Key people: Melissa Proctor-Pitchford, state pageant director
- Website: MissMichiganUSA.com

The Miss Michigan Teen USA competition is the pageant that selects the representative for the state of Michigan in the Miss Teen USA pageant and the name of the title held by that winner. This pageant is produced by Proctor Productions, including Melissa Pitchford who was Miss Ohio USA 1990.

In terms of number of placements, Michigan has a moderated success at Miss Teen USA, having only placed ten times. The state's highest placement was in 2005, when Catherine "Cathy" Laurion was 1st runner-up to Allie LaForce of Ohio. Courtney Pizzimenti placed 2nd runner-up at Miss Teen USA 2012.

Mia Vanessa Prom of Deltona, FL was appointed Miss Michigan Teen USA 2026 on July 30th, 2026, after the open casting call from Thomas Brodeur, the new owner of the national pageant. She will represent Michigan at Miss Teen USA 2026.

== Results summary ==
=== Placements ===
- 1st runner-up: Catherine "Cathy" Laurion (2005)
- 2nd runners-up: Alicia Jaros (2003), Courtney Pizzimenti (2012)
- 3rd runner-up: Isabella Mosqueda (2022)
- Top 5: Sara Dusendang (1999)
- Top 10: Tamika Thomas (1996)
- Top 15: Raquel McClendon (2006), Kristen Danyal (2009), Iris Robare (2014), Anane Loveday (2018)
- Top 20: Mia Vanessa Prom (2026)

Michigan holds a record of 11 placements at Miss Teen USA.

== Winners ==
- Declared as Winner
- Ended as runner-up
- Ended as one of the finalists or semifinalists

| Year | Name | Hometown | Age^{1} | Local title | Placement at Miss Teen USA | Special awards at Miss Teen USA | Notes |
|---|---|---|---|---|---|---|---|
| 2026 | Mia Vanessa Prom | Tampa, FL | 17 | Miss Tampa Bay Teen | Top 20 | | 2nd runner-up at Miss Florida Teen USA 2026 |
| 2025 | Eliy Simmer | Clare | 19 | Miss Clare Teen | | | |
| 2024 | Maddison Lynn Kott | Troy | 18 | Miss Heart of Michigan Teen | | | |
| 2023 | Avery Hill | Farmington Hills | 16 | Miss Farmington Hills Teen | | | |
| 2022 | Isabella Mosqueda | Cedar Springs | 19 | Miss Pure Michigan Teen | 3rd runner-up | | |
| 2021 | Jada Moylan | Hudsonville | 17 | Miss Lake State Teen | | | Daughter of Miss Michigan Teen USA 1999, Sara Dusendang-Moylan |
| 2020 | Aneesa Sheikh | Bloomfield Hills | 18 | Miss Bloomfield Hills Teen | | | Longest running Miss Teen USA state titleholder at 1 year, 10 months and 17 days onto the organization's history |
| 2019 | Alexis Lubecki | Canton | 18 | Miss Canton Teen | | | |
| 2018 | Anane Loveday | Grosse Ile | 16 | Miss Grosse Ile Teen | Top 15 | | |
| 2017 | Kenzie Weingartz | Marysville | 17 | Miss Marysville Teen | | | |
| 2016 | Unjaneé Wells | Ypsilanti | 18 | Miss Heart of Michigan Teen | | | |
| 2015 | Maria Rendina | Monroe | 18 | Miss Monroe Teen | | | |
| 2014 | Iris Robare | Gladstone | 16 | Miss Upper Peninsula Teen | Top 15 | | |
| 2013 | Ruby King | Ludington | 17 | Miss Mason County Teen | | | |
| 2012 | Courtney Pizzimenti | Oakland Township | 17 | Miss Oakland Teen | 2nd runner-up | | |
| 2011 | Taylor Sherman | Dearborn Heights | 17 | Miss Dearborn Heights Teen | | | |
| 2010 | Catherine McGhee | Ortonville | 16 | Miss Ortonville Teen | | | |
| 2009 | Kristen Danyal | Sterling Heights | 19 | Miss Sterling Heights Teen | Top 15 | | Later Miss Michigan USA 2012; Top 16 at Miss USA 2012 |
| 2008 | Elizabeth Hawthorne | Clarkston | 17 | Miss Clarkston Teen | | | |
| 2007 | Caitlin Klug | Eau Claire | 18 | Miss Berrien County Teen | | | |
| 2006 | Raquel McClendon | Kincheloe | 17 | Miss Northern Michigan Teen | Top 15 | | |
| 2005 | Catherine "Cathy" Laurion | West Branch | 17 | Miss West Branch Teen | 1st runner-up | | |
| 2004 | Yelena Crawford | Brooklyn | 18 | Miss Southern Michigan Teen | | | |
| 2003 | Alicia Jaros | Riverview | 17 | Miss Metro Detroit Teen | 2nd runner-up | | |
| 2002 | Kyleen Krstich | Troy | 18 | Miss Troy Teen | | | |
| 2001 | Chelsea-Lyn Rudder | Rochester Hills | 17 | | | | |
| 2000 | Kylie Rhew | Bridgman | 17 | | | | |
| 1999 | Sara Dusendang | Paris | 18 | | Top 5, finishing in 5th place | | Later Mrs. Michigan America 2008 under her married name, Sara Dusendang-Moylan. Mother of Miss Michigan Teen USA 2021, Jada Moylan |
| 1998 | Elizabeth Mathis | Detroit | 18 | | | | |
| 1997 | Che'vonne Burton | Detroit | 15 | | | | Later Miss Michigan 2000; Top 10 at Miss America 2001 |
| 1996 | Tamika Thomas | Detroit | 18 | | Top 10 | | |
| 1995 | Kathleen McConnell | Trenton | 18 | | | | |
| 1994 | Melissa Jackson | Wixom | | | | | |
| 1993 | Ashley Whitt | Macomb | | | | | |
| 1992 | WaLynda Lou Sipple | Berrien Springs | | | | | Later Miss Nebraska USA 1999; Mother of Miss Nebraska Teen USA 2024 Maggie Wadginski |
| 1991 | Lori Hahnbomb | Chelsea | | | | | |
| 1990 | Erica Webber | Niles | | | | | |
| 1989 | Betsy Cox | Edwardsburg | 18 | | | | |
| 1988 | Melissa Sinkevics | Dearborn Heights | | | | | Mother of Aidan Hutchinson and Miss Michigan USA 2022 Aria Hutchinson |
| 1987 | Elena Hall | Warren | | | | | |
| 1986 | Terri Turner | Clawson | | | | | |
| 1985 | Tracy Shaw | St. Clair | | | | | |
| 1984 | Dawn Downing | South Haven | | | | | |
| 1983 | Cathy McBride | Farmington Hills | 17 | | | | |

^{1} Age at the time of the Miss Teen USA pageant
