= Miss Teen USA 1988 =

6th edition of the Miss Teen USA competition

- Date: July 25, 1988
- Presenters: Dick Clark; Tracy Scoggins
- Venue: Orange Pavilion, San Bernardino, California
- Broadcaster: CBS; KCBS-TV
- Entrants: 51
- Placements: 10
- Winner: Mindy Duncan; Oregon
- Congeniality: Anna Mingus; Alabama; Missy Pierce; Tennessee
- Photogenic: Kathleen McClellan; Illinois

Miss Teen USA 1988, the 6th Miss Teen USA pageant, was televised live from San Bernardino, California on July 25, 1988. At the conclusion of the final competition, Mindy Duncan of Oregon was crowned by outgoing queen Kristi Addis of Mississippi.

This was the first of two years the pageant was held in San Bernardino. It was hosted by Dick Clark for the first time, with color commentary from Tracy Scoggins. The preliminary competition was hosted by KCBS-TV weatherman Maclovio Perez and beauty expert Beverly Sassoon.

This was also the last time the State Costume competition took place and would not return until thirty-three years later in 2021, under a different organization.

== Results ==
This pageant had a top ten, with five finalists.

=== Placements ===
Final results	Contestant
Miss Teen USA 1988	Oregon – Mindy Duncan
1st Runner-Up	New York – Jessica Collins
2nd Runner-Up	Louisiana – Amy Pietsch
3rd Runner-Up	Illinois – Kathleen McClellan
4th Runner-Up	Alabama – Anna Mingus
Top 10	Mississippi – Honey East; New Jersey - Michelle Knipfelberg; New Mexico – Jill Vasquez; Texas – Libby Pelton; West Virginia – Wendy Stephens

=== Special awards ===
Award	Contestant
Miss Congeniality	Alabama – Anna Mingus and Tennessee – Missy Pierce
Miss Photogenic	Texas – Kathleen McClellan
Best State costume	California – Alison Moreno

== Delegates ==
The Miss Teen USA 1988 delegates were:

- Alabama - Anna Mingus
- Alaska - Joleen Jeffcoat
- Arizona - Kristen Peterson
- Arkansas - Jessica Welch
- California - Alison Moreno (disqualified)
- Colorado - Leah Crawford
- Connecticut - Bobbie Jo Shanahan
- Delaware - Edith Senter
- District of Columbia - Sabrina Curtis
- Florida - Holly Nicholson
- Georgia - Erin Nance
- Hawaii - Michelle Wong
- Idaho - Renee Griggs
- Illinois - Kathleen McLelland
- Indiana - Deborah Lindboe
- Iowa - Stacy Horst
- Kansas - Jennifer Eastes
- Kentucky - Marti Hendricks
- Louisiana - Amy Pietsch
- Maine - Christine Despres
- Maryland - Sherry Twilley
- Massachusetts - Alicia Gawrys
- Michigan - Melissa Sinkevics
- Minnesota - Julie Ward
- Mississippi - Honey East
- Missouri - Beverly Boatright
- Montana - Kristen Anderson
- Nebraska - Pamela Brown
- Nevada - Erin Abernathy
- New Hampshire - Christa Jones
- New Jersey - Michelle Knipfelberg
- New Mexico - Jill Vasquez
- New York - Jessica Collins
- North Carolina - Michelle Moore
- North Dakota - Jennifer Seminary
- Ohio - Teresa Merola
- Oklahoma - Linda Parsons
- Oregon - Mindy Duncan
- Pennsylvania - Desiree Fess
- Rhode Island - Debbie Peters
- South Carolina - Nicole Adams
- South Dakota - Jillayne Fossum
- Tennessee - Missy Pierce
- Texas - Libby Pelton
- Utah - Kathleen Treadway
- Vermont - Andrea Varney
- Virginia - Audra Wilks
- Washington - Karen Petre
- West Virginia - Wendy Stephens
- Wisconsin - Jennifer Schwalenberg
- Wyoming - Michele Apostoles

== Contestant notes ==
- After competing in the preliminary competition and winning the Best State Costume award, Alison Moreno (California) was disqualified from the final competition after she left her room without a chaperone, contrary to pageant rules.
- Delegates who later competed in the Miss USA pageant were:
  - Jillayne Fossum (South Dakota) - Miss South Dakota USA 1991
  - Erin Nance (Georgia) - Miss Georgia USA 1993 (first runner-up at Miss USA 1993)
  - Jennifer Seminary (North Dakota) - Miss North Dakota USA 1993
  - Kristen Anderson (Montana) - Miss Montana USA 1993
  - Jill Vasquez (New Mexico) - Miss New Mexico USA 1994
  - Anna Mingus (Alabama) - Miss Alabama USA 1995
  - Audra Wilks (Virginia) - Miss Virginia USA 1997
- Jill Vasquez became one of the directors of the Miss California USA and Miss California Teen USA pageants in 2007.
- Jessica Collins became a successful actress who played Meredith Davies on Tru Calling.
