= Miss Teen USA 1987 =

- Date: July 21, 1987
- Presenters: Michael Young; Tracy Scoggins
- Venue: El Paso Civic Center, El Paso, Texas
- Broadcaster: CBS; KDBC-TV
- Entrants: 51
- Placements: 10
- Winner: Kristi Lynn Addis; Mississippi
- Congeniality: Allison Barbeau-Diorio; Connecticut
- Photogenic: Angi Aylor; California; Raye Anne Johnson; Rhode Island

Miss Teen USA 1987, the 5th Miss Teen USA pageant, was televised live from El Paso Civic Center, El Paso, Texas on July 21, 1987. At the conclusion of the final competition, Kristi Lynn Addis of Mississippi was crowned by outgoing queen Allison Brown of Oklahoma.

== Background ==
In March 1987, both El Paso County and the El Paso City Council voted to support a bid to host Miss Teen USA 1987, each contributing an equal share of the financial backing. El Paso provided over 300 volunteers, 3,000 hotel room nights, and $150,000 in funding to facilitate the event The expected return on their investment included 15 minutes of promotional footage of the El Paso area, broadcast to over 80 million viewers throughout the United States.

Richard Guy and Rex Holt, directors of the Miss Texas USA pageant at the time, were involved in bringing the pageant to El Paso and organising the event.

== Event ==
A state 'gift' auction, featuring items donated by contestants from each state, along with a state costume competition, collectively raised over $3,800 for charities in El Paso. The state costume competition was won by Juli Hodges, Miss Arizona Teen USA, who appeared dressed as a gold thunderbird. Second place was Miss California Teen USA Angie Aylor and third place was Miss South Carolina Teen USA Carol Carver.

For the first time in the history of the Miss Teen USA pageant, the Miss Photogenic award resulted in a tie, with Raye-Anne Johnson of Rhode Island and Angie Aylor of California sharing the honor.

Actress Stephanie Kramer was due to host the pageant alongside Michael Young but had to withdraw due to an inner ear infection; Tracy Scoggins was brought in to replace her.

== Judges ==
The celebrity panel of judges consisted of the following:

- Tai Babilonia and Randy Gardner – World champion ice skaters and US Senior Pairs Champions
- Sharyn Skeeter - editor of Black Elegance Magazine
- Michael Maron – celebrity make up artist and hair stylist
- Kelly Hu - Miss Teen USA 1985 from Hawaii
- Michaeljohn – hair stylist
- Cpt. Terri Jones – model, businesswoman and commercially rated pilot
- John H. Brennan – actor, Another World
- Ramón Sheen – actor and son of Michael Sheen
- Adele Laufer – managing editor of BOP Magazine
- Dean Devlin – actor, L.A. Law and Hard Copy

== Results ==
=== Placements ===
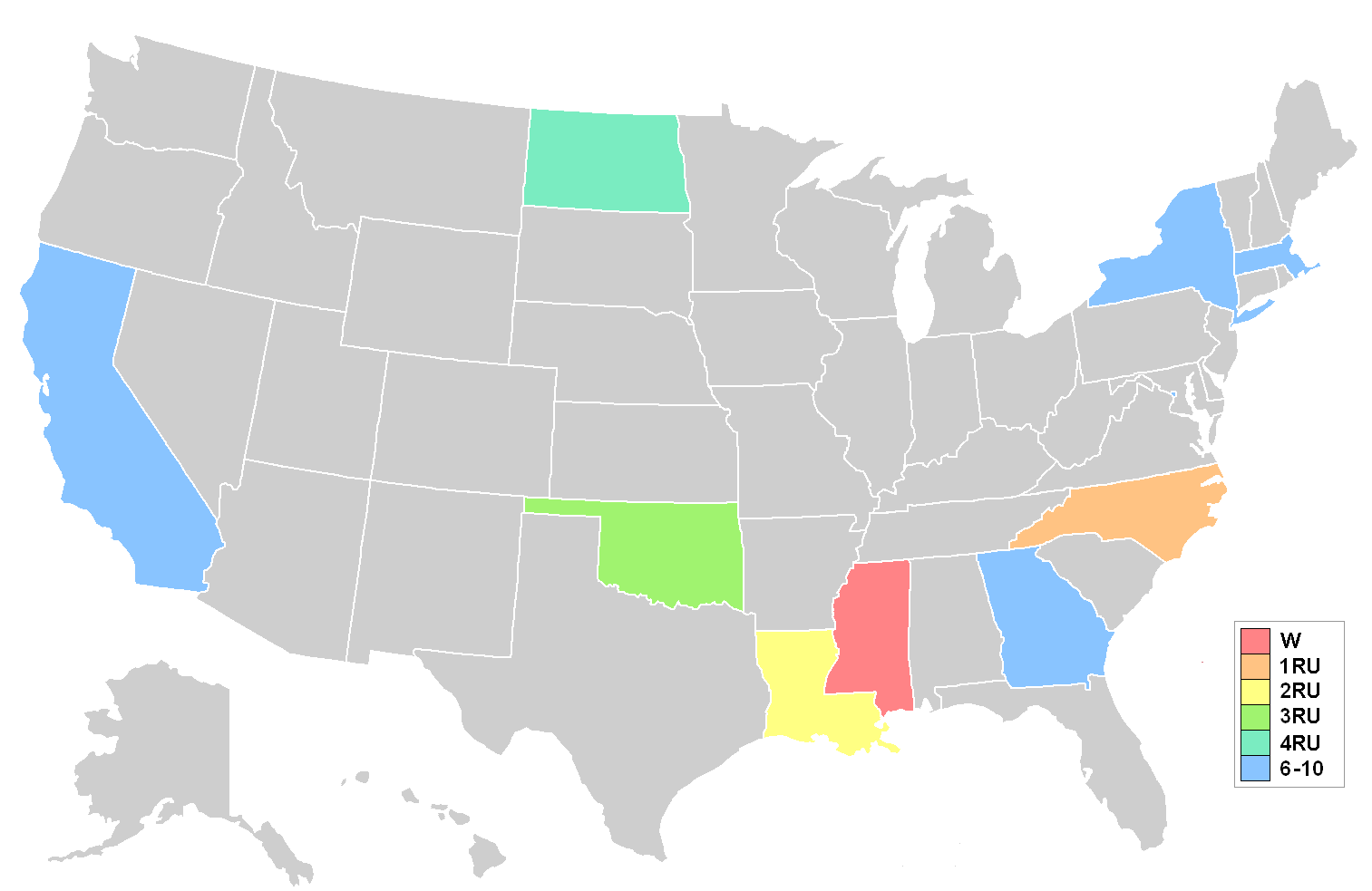
Map showing placements by state

The Miss Teen USA 1987 results were as follows:

Final results	Contestant
Miss Teen USA 1987	Mississippi – Kristi Lynn Addis
1st Runner-Up	North Carolina – Peggy Blackwell
2nd Runner-Up	Louisiana – Bobbie Brown
3rd Runner-Up	Oklahoma – Raelynn Coffman
4th Runner-Up	North Dakota – DayNa Decker
Top 10	California – Angi Aylor; District of Columbia – Ni’Cole Elayne Bobbitt; Georgia – Melissa Hope Allen; Massachusetts – Kristen Lee Mastroianni; New York – Michelle Ann Kelenski

=== Special awards ===
Award	Contestant
Miss Amity	Connecticut – Allison Barbeau-Diorio
Miss Photogenic	California – Angi Aylor and Rhode Island - Raye-Anne Johnson
Best state costume	Arizona – Julie Hodges

== Delegates ==
The Miss Teen USA 1986 delegates were:

State/District	Contestant	Age (Note: Ages at the time of the pageant)	Hometown	Placement/Award	Notes	Ref.
Alabama	Elizabeth Woodman	17	Pleasant Grove			
Alaska	Lauren Straubb					
Arizona	Juli Hodges	17	Phoenix	Best state costume		
Arkansas	Paige Yandell		Greenwood		Later Miss Arkansas USA 1989	
California	Angie Aylor	15	El Toro	Semi-finalist & Miss Photogenic		
Colorado	Nicki Anselmo					
Connecticut	Allison Barbeau-Diorio		Fairfield	Miss Amity	Later Miss Connecticut USA 1990	
Delaware	Cristi Griffin	16	Newark			
District of Columbia	Ni'Cole Bobbitt	17	Washington, D.C.	Semi-finalist		
Florida	Kimberlee Edwards	15	Key West			
Georgia	Melissa Hope Allan	16	Thomaston	Semi-finalist		
Hawaii	Leslie Ann Lum	16	Honolulu		Later assumed Miss Hawaii USA 1997 title	
Idaho	Luanne Relyea	18	Meridian			
Illinois	Danielle Reese	16	Riverwoods			
Indiana	Terri Salmon	16	Hammond			
Iowa	Jan Hoyer	17	Fort Madison		Later Miss Iowa USA 1993 and top ten at Miss USA 1993	
Kansas	Stephanie Resnick	17	Whitewater			
Kentucky	Tracy Marsee	15				
Louisiana	Bobbie Brown	17	Baton Rouge	2nd runner-up		
Maine	Donna Stevenson	17	Bangor			
Maryland	Renee Rebstock	17	Pasadena		Later Miss Maryland USA 1992	
Massachusetts	Kristen Mastroianni	16	Wilbraham	Semi-finalist	Later Miss Massachusetts USA 1995 and a semi-finalist at Miss USA 1995	
Michigan	Elena Hall					
Minnesota	Karin Hargroves	17	Shoreview			
Mississippi	Kristi Addis		Holcomb	Miss Teen USA		
Missouri	Sherri Gardner	17	Kansas City			
Montana	Andrea Madsen		Bozeman			
Nebraska	Susan Weikel	17	Elkhorn			
Nevada	Terri Broca					
New Hampshire	Cara Daras					
New Jersey	Tara Eldridge	16	Voorhees			
New Mexico	Samantha Romero Owen	17	Albuquerque			
New York	Michelle Kelenski	18	Ballston Spa	Semi-finalist		
North Carolina	Peggy Blackwell	17	Fayetteville	1st runner-up		
North Dakota	DayNa Decker	17	Fargo	4th runner-up		
Ohio	Christy Hoyt	17	New Concord			
Oklahoma	Jannetta Kaufman	17	Oklahoma City	3rd runner-up		
Oregon	Kasey Weisiger	17	Jacksonville			
Pennsylvania	Tracy Reed	16	Myerstown			
Rhode Island	Raye-Anne Johnson	17	Wakefield	Miss Photogenic	Later Miss Rhode Island USA 1994	
South Carolina	Carol Carver	17	Hilton Head Island			
South Dakota	Cammy Varland		Keldron			
Tennessee	Shannon Castle	17	McMinnville			
Texas	Richelle Kesling	15	Spring			
Utah	Tiffany DeMille		Orem			
Vermont	Christy Beltrami		Barre		Later Miss Vermont USA 1994	
Virginia	Kristi Pearce	16	Colonial Heights			
Washington	Johna Sainsbury					
West Virginia	Cheryl Cullop					
Wisconsin	Barbara Nelson	16	Oshkosh			
Wyoming	Kim Roberts		Rock Springs			
