= Kristi Addis =

American beauty pageant contestant

- Born: January 6, 1971 (age 54); Holcomb, Mississippi, U.S.
- Beauty pageant titleholder
- Hair color: Blonde
- Eye color: Brown

Kristi Lynn Addis Hickman (born January 6, 1971) is an American actress, journalist, athlete and beauty pageant titleholder who was crowned Miss Teen USA 1987.

== Biography ==
In high school, Addis was a point guard on the three-time state championship-winning basketball team and was one of Mississippi's best high school mile runners. She won six national championship twirling titles and was picked to compete in a potential twirling team for the 1984 Summer Olympics.

Hickman was named Miss Mississippi Teen USA 1987 and went on to win the Miss Teen USA title on July 21, 1987, in El Paso, Texas. She was the first Miss Teen USA pageant winner from Mississippi. She remained in school during her year as Miss Teen USA and traveled on weekends and holidays, advocating for Nancy Reagan's "Just Say No" program in schools. As Miss Teen USA she received prizes worth $150,000, attended a festival in Acapulco and received a part in the television series The New Gidget.
