= Miss Teen USA 1985 =

3rd edition of the Miss Teen USA competition

- Date: January 22, 1985
- Presenters: Lorenzo Lamas; Lisa Hartman
- Venue: James L. Knight Center, Miami, Florida
- Broadcaster: CBS; WTVJ
- Entrants: 51
- Placements: 10
- Winner: Kelly Hu; Hawaii
- Congeniality: Chelle Wilson; Mississippi
- Photogenic: Lisa Jessen; West Virginia

Miss Teen USA 1985, the 3rd Miss Teen USA pageant, was televised live from the James L. Knight International Center Arena in Miami, Florida on 22 January 1985. At the conclusion of the final competition, Kelly Hu of Hawaii was crowned by outgoing queen Cherise Haugen of Illinois. Haugen's reign had lasted only 10 months.

== Background ==
Miss Teen USA 1983, the inaugural Miss Teen USA pageant, took place in Lakeland, Florida, in August 1983, while Miss Teen USA 1984 was held in Memphis, Tennessee, in April 1984. In August 1984, an agreement was signed between the pageant organizers and the city of Miami, Florida, to host Miss Teen USA 1985, Miss Universe 1985, Miss Teen USA 1986, and Miss USA 1986. Miss Teen USA 1984 Cherise Haugen travelled to Miami in December 1984 to promote the pageant.

== Event ==
The 1985 pageant was hosted by Lorenzo Lamas of Falcon Crest and Lisa Hartman of Knots Landing, both for the first time. Entertainment was provided by Kool and the Gang and the Solid Gold Dancers.

The contestants spent two and a half weeks in Miami before the final night of competition, spending their time in rehearsals, visiting local sights and participating in pageant activities.

== Results ==
=== Placements ===
The 1985 pageant had five finalists and five semi-finalists.

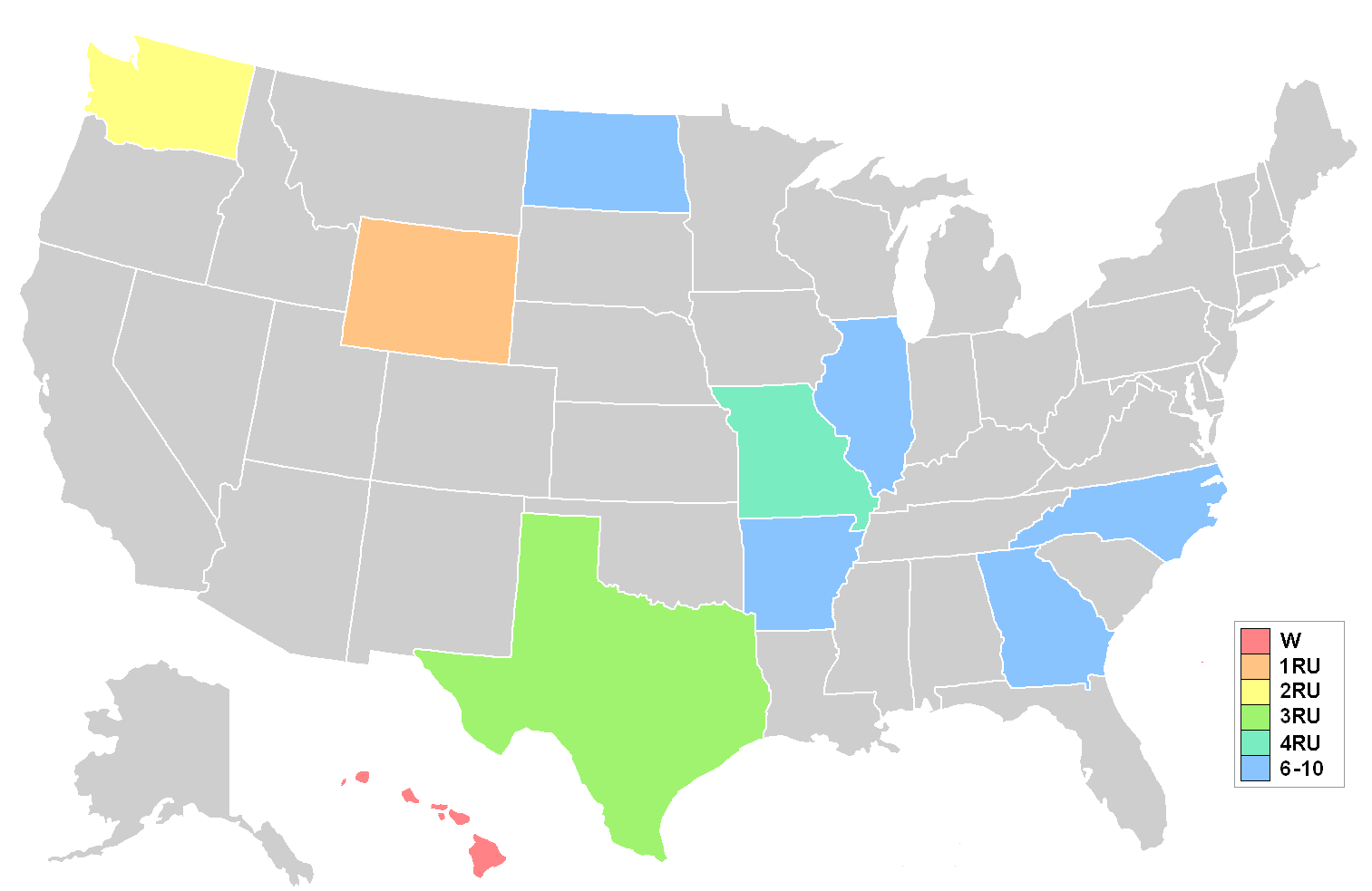
Map showing placements by state

Final results	Contestant
Miss Teen USA 1985	Hawaii – Kelly Hu
1st Runner-Up	Wyoming – Emily Ernst
2nd Runner-Up	Washington – Dru Homer
3rd Runner-Up	Texas – Konae Wehle
4th Runner-Up	Missouri – Rhonda Hoglan
Top 10	Arkansas – Rhonda Heird; Georgia – Meredith Brown; Illinois – Lisa Jessen; North Carolina – Kimberly Jordan; North Dakota – Jill Hutchinson

=== Special awards ===
Award	Contestant
Miss Congeniality	Mississippi – Chelle Wilson
Miss Photogenic	Illinois – Lisa Jessen
Best state costume	West Virginia – Kelly Porterfield

== Judges ==
The celebrity judges were:

- Ken Swofford
- Cathy Rigby McCoy – sports broadcaster and former Olympic gymnast
- Christian LeBlanc – actor, As the World Turns
- Ruth Zakarian - Miss Teen USA 1983 from New York
- Rowdy Gaines – Olympic gold medal swimmer
- Lindsay Bloom – star of Mickey Spillane's Mike Hammer
- Eric Van Lustbader – novelist
- Krista Tesreau – actress, Guiding Light
- Mayf Nutter – actor, Knots Landing
- Rebbie Jackson – singer
- Frank Bonner

== Delegates ==
The Miss Teen USA 1985 delegates were:

- Alabama - Teresa Cain
- Alaska - Debbie Eason
- Arizona - Vanessa Steffens
- Arkansas - Rhonda Heird
- California - Sharon Gunther
- Colorado - Debbie James
- Connecticut - Kristine Kunst
- Delaware - Julie Wheatley
- District of Columbia - Meisha Hayes
- Florida - Erin Townsend
- Georgia - Meredith Brown
- Hawaii - Kelly Hu
- Idaho - Tracey Shirley
- Illinois - Lisa Jessen
- Indiana - Dianna Bullard
- Iowa - Alisha Black
- Kansas - Tammy Lampton
- Kentucky - Leigh Ann Gregory
- Louisiana - Julie Scimeca
- Maine - Tracy Smith
- Maryland - Lynn Bogardus
- Massachusetts - Maria Ingles
- Michigan - Tracey Shaw
- Minnesota - Lana Burke
- Mississippi - Chelle Wilson
- Missouri - Rhonda Hoglan
- Montana - Katie Adams
- Nebraska - Tina Farber
- Nevada - Leslye Peterson
- New Hampshire - Katherine Borski
- New Jersey - Sharon Turner
- New Mexico - Teresa Rodriguez
- New York - Shelley Lown
- North Carolina - Kimberly Jordan
- North Dakota - Jill Hutchinson
- Ohio - Meg Scranton
- Oklahoma - Julie Khourey
- Oregon - Olga Calderon
- Pennsylvania - Kari Bernowski
- Rhode Island - Chris Pavalli
- South Carolina - Jennifer Neuen
- South Dakota - Sarah Bergraft
- Tennessee - Tammy Woods
- Texas - Konae Wehle
- Utah - Susan Nelson
- Vermont - Wanda Minard
- Virginia - Alice Robinson
- Washington - Dru Homer
- West Virginia - Kelly Porterfield
- Wisconsin - Maria Kim
- Wyoming - Emily Ernst

== Contestant notes ==
- In 1993 Kelly Hu became the first Miss Teen USA winner to win a Miss USA state pageant. As Miss Hawaii USA she competed in the Miss USA 1993 pageant, making the finals and finishing 4th (3rd runner up, top 6 finalist), and winning the Miss Photogenic award.
- Other delegates who later competed in the Miss USA pageant were:
  - Debbie James (Colorado) - Miss Colorado USA 1989 (Top 10 semifinalist at Miss USA 1989)
  - Rhonda Hoglan (Missouri) - Miss Missouri USA 1989
  - Julie Khourey (Oklahoma) - Miss Oklahoma USA 1991 (Top 6 finalist at Miss USA 1991)
  - Olga Calderon (Oregon) - Miss Oregon USA 1991 (Semi-finalist at Miss USA 1991)
- Two contestants later competed in the Miss America pageant: Maria Kim (Wisconsin) who was Miss Wisconsin 1987, and Teresa Rodriguez (New Mexico) who was Miss New Mexico 1988.
