= Miss Nebraska Teen USA =

Beauty pageant competition

- Formation: 1983
- Type: Beauty pageant
- Headquarters: Shawnee
- Location: Kansas
- Members: Miss Teen USA
- Official language: English
- Key people: John M. Vannatta; Jason Vannatta; Jennifer Vannatta-Fisher, State Pageant Director
- Website: Official website

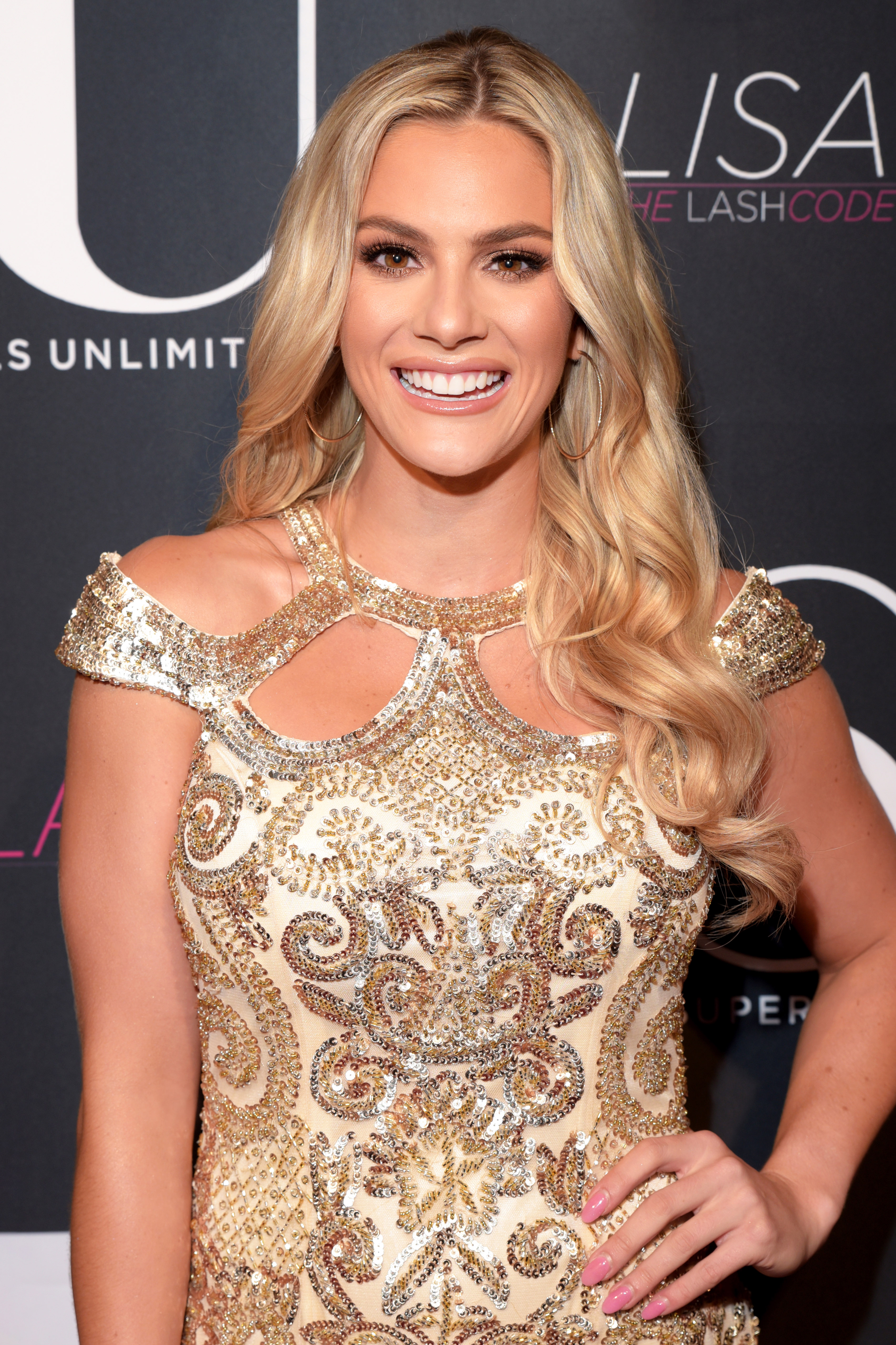
Sarah Rose Summers, Miss Nebraska Teen USA 2012, Miss Nebraska USA 2018, and Miss USA 2018

The Miss Nebraska Teen USA competition is the pageant that selects the representative for the state of Nebraska in the Miss Teen USA pageant. The pageant is directed by Vanbros & Associates, headquartered in Shawnee, Kansas. In 2002, Nebraska joined the Vanbros group of state pageants for the Miss USA and Teen USA system. In 2022, Nebraska became the 28th state that won the Miss Teen USA title for the first time.

Nebraska has had only seven placements at Miss Teen USA. The state was the second-to-last to make its first placement, which came in 2004, when Meagan Winings advanced to the semi-finals.

Six Nebraska teens have crossed over to win the Miss Nebraska USA title and compete at Miss USA, with Sarah Summers being the most successful, winning the title of Miss USA 2018. One other Nebraskan previously competed in the Miss America's Outstanding Teen.

Faron Medhi of Omaha crowned Miss Nebraska Teen USA 2022 on March 6, 2022, at Rose Blumkin Performing Arts Center in Omaha, went on to win Miss Teen USA 2022 on October 1, 2022, becoming the first delegate from Nebraska to win the title.

Brynlee Hansen of Bennington was crowned Miss Nebraska Teen USA 2026 on June 28, 2026 at The Garden Theater in Omaha. She will represent Nebraska at Miss Teen USA 2026.

== Results summary ==
=== Placements ===
- Miss Teen USA: Faron Medhi (2022)
- 3rd runner-up: Audrey Eckert (2020)
- Top 10: Meagan Winings (2004)
- Top 15/16/20: Danielle Zuroski (2006), Erin Swanson (2019), Daisy Sudderth (2021), Maggie Wadginski (2024)

Nebraska holds a record of 7 placements at Miss Teen USA.

=== Awards ===
- Miss Congeniality: Jasmine Fuelberth (2013), Daisy Sudderth (2021)

== Winners ==
- Declared as Winner
- Ended as runner-up
- Ended as one of the finalists or semifinalists

Year	Name	Hometown	Age^{1}	Local title	Placement at Miss Teen USA	Special awards at Miss Teen USA	Notes
2026	Brynlee Hansen	Bennington	18	Miss Bennington Teen			
2025	Kaitlyn Halvorsen	Lincoln	16	Miss Lancaster Teen			
2024	Maggie Wadginski	Omaha	19	Miss Omaha Teen	Top 20		Previously Miss Nebraska Teen Volunteer 2024; Daughter of Miss Michigan Teen USA 1992 & Miss Nebraska USA 1999 WaLynda Lu Sipple
2023	Aubrie Charter	North Platte	18	Miss Lincoln County Teen			
2022	Faron Medhi	Omaha	18	Miss Omaha Teen	Miss Teen USA 2022		First Asian American Miss Nebraska Teen USA
2021	Daisy Sudderth	Omaha	18	Miss Omaha Teen	Top 16	Miss Congeniality	
2020	Audrey Eckert	Lincoln	17	Miss Southeast Lincoln Teen	3rd runner-up		Later Miss Nebraska USA 2025 and Miss USA 2025
2019	Erin Shae Swanson	Norfolk	18	Miss Norfolk Teen	Top 15		Cousin of Nora Steinke, Miss Wyoming Teen USA 2022
2018	Michaela Edstrand	Omaha	17	Miss West Omaha Teen			
2017	Samantha Washington	Lincoln	18	Miss South Lincoln Teen			Previously Miss Nebraska's Outstanding Teen 2013; Later Miss Nebraska USA 2025; assumed the title when Audrey Eckert won Miss USA; First African American Miss Nebraska Teen USA First woman in Nebraska to hold teen titles in both the Miss America and Miss USA organizations Later 2nd runner-up at Miss Nebraska USA 2019 and 2020 competitions & 1st Runner-Up in 2025 Later contestant on season 28 of The Bachelor
2016	Erika Etzelmiller	Lincoln	18	Miss West Lincoln Teen			Later Miss Nebraska USA 2021; Top 16 at Miss USA 2021
2015	Paige Pflueger	Lincoln	17	Miss Norfolk Teen			Daughter of Paula Louise Mitchell, Miss Nebraska 1980
2014	Savannah Rave	Omaha	18	Miss Omaha Teen			
2013	Jasmine Fuelberth	Norfolk	16	Miss Norfolk Teen		Miss Congeniality	Later Miss Nebraska USA 2017
2012	Sarah Rose Summers	Omaha	17	Miss Sarpy County Teen			Previously National American Miss Teen Junior 2009–10; Later Miss Nebraska USA 2018 and Miss USA 2018
2011	Madison Novak	Lincoln	17	Miss Capital City Teen			Later 2nd runner-up at Miss Nebraska USA 2015; Later 3rd runner-up at Miss Nebraska USA 2016; Later 2nd runner-up at Miss Nebraska USA 2017
2010	Amanda Soltero	Columbus	18	Miss Columbus Teen			Later Miss Nebraska USA 2014; Top 20 at Miss USA 2014
2009	Sarah Hollins	Omaha	18	Miss Greater Omaha Teen			Later Miss Nebraska USA 2016
2008	Melissa DeJong	David City	17	Miss David City Teen			
2007	Lauren Clabaugh	Omaha	16	Miss Westside Teen			
2006	Danielle Zuroski	Ralston	18	Miss Seward Teen	Top 15		
2005	Kelsy Brown	Wood River	17				
2004	Meagan Winings	Atkinson	18		Top 10		Later Miss Nebraska USA 2009; First Miss Nebraska Teen USA to ever make the semifinals at the national pageant
2003	Leighann Thagard	Omaha	17				
2002	Brieanne Bogart	Omaha	17			Honorable Mention	
2001	Heidi Lammli	Stanton	16				
2000	Amy Weigert	Grand Island	17				
1999	Kiley Kempcke	Blair	18				
1998	Lori Andersen	Blair	18				
1997	Natasha Fisher	Arapahoe	17				
1996	Mandy Groff	Omaha	17				
1995	Marlo McVea	Omaha	18				
1994	Elizabeth Schmitz	Omaha	18				
1993	Lauriette Logan	Omaha	17				
1992	Marney Monson	Wallace	16				
1991	Erin Mosser	Omaha	15				
1990	Shauna Redfern	Omaha	15				
1989	Melissa Jennings	Hastings	17				
1988	Pamela Brown	Omaha	18				
1987	Susan Weikel	Elkhorn	18				
1986	Elizabeth Feige	Omaha	18				
1985	Tina Farber	Omaha	17				
1984	Cyndi Freymuller	Blair	17				
1983	Jacqueline Jae "Jackie" Kuenning	Lincoln	17				

^{1} Age at the time of the Miss Teen USA pageant
