= UmaSofia Srivastava =

American beauty pageant titleholder

- Born: June 5, 2007 (age 19); New Jersey, U.S.
- Beauty pageant titleholder
- Title: Miss New Jersey Teen USA 2023; Miss Teen USA 2023
- Major competitions: Miss New Jersey Teen USA 2023; (Winner); Miss Teen USA 2023; (Winner; Resigned)

UmaSofia Srivastava (born June 5, 2007) is an American beauty pageant titleholder who won Miss New Jersey Teen USA 2023. She had previously won Miss Teen USA 2023. Srivastava was the first competitor from New Jersey to have won Miss Teen USA.

== Early life and education ==
Raised in Parsippany-Troy Hills, New Jersey, Srisvatava has attended the Academy of Saint Elizabeth, transferring from Parsippany Hills High School after ninth grade.

== Pageantry ==
=== Miss Teen USA 2023 ===
After winning Miss New Jersey Teen USA, Srivastava represented New Jersey and won Miss Teen USA 2023 in Reno, Nevada, on September 28, 2023. She became the first titleholder of Mexican-Indian American descent and the second consecutive titleholder of Indian descent after Faron Medhi of Nebraska won in 2022. On May 7, 2024, she resigned her Miss Teen USA title, stating that her values "no longer fully align with the direction of the organization".

Awards and achievements
Preceded by Faron Medhi	Miss Teen USA; 2023	Vacant Title next held by Addie Carver
Preceded by Isabella Galan	Miss New Jersey Teen USA; 2023	Succeeded by Julia Carrano
