= Breanna Myles =

American beauty pageant contestant

- Born: February 18, 2003 (age 23); Kentucky, U.S.
- Education: Indian River State College (AA); Florida State University
- Beauty pageant titleholder
- Title: Miss Florida Teen USA 2021; Miss Teen USA 2021
- Major competitions: Miss Florida Teen USA 2021; (Winner); Miss Teen USA 2021; (Winner)

Breanna Myles (born February 18, 2003) is an American beauty pageant titleholder who won Miss Florida Teen USA 2021. Myles had previously won Miss Teen USA 2021, and became the first competitor from Florida to win Miss Teen USA.

== Early life and education ==
Myles was born in Kentucky to a Dominican mother and an African-American father, she moved to Florida at age seven. She was raised in Port St. Lucie, Florida, and graduated from high school in 2021, with a dual enrollment associate degree from Indian River State College. Prior to becoming Miss Teen USA, Myles was studying computer science and musical theatre at Florida State University and aspired to become a software engineer.

== Pageantry ==
Myles began her pageantry career at age 12. She first competed in Miss Florida Teen USA in 2020, where she was the third runner-up despite falling on stage. Myles returned the following year, and won Miss Florida Teen USA 2021. As Miss Florida Teen USA, Myles would represent Florida at Miss Teen USA 2021.

Myles won Miss Teen USA 2021 on November 27, 2021, in Tulsa, Oklahoma. She was crowned by the outgoing titleholder Kiʻilani Arruda, and was the first winner from Florida to be crowned Miss Teen USA. Myles was also the first (and only) titleholder under the new Miss USA Organization.

Awards and achievements
Preceded by Kiʻilani Arruda, Hawaii	Miss Teen USA; 2021	Succeeded by Faron Medhi, Nebraska
Preceded by Rylie Spicker	Miss Florida Teen USA; 2021	Succeeded by Alyssa Khan
