= Faron Medhi =

American model and beauty pageant titleholder

- Born: January 26, 2004 (age 22); Omaha, Nebraska, U.S.
- Height: 5 ft 10 in (178 cm)
- Beauty pageant titleholder
- Title: Miss Omaha Teen USA 2022; Miss Nebraska Teen USA 2022; Miss Teen USA 2022
- Major competitions: Miss Nebraska Teen USA 2022; (Winner); Miss Teen USA 2022; (Winner)

Faron Medhi (born 26 January 2004) is an American model and beauty queen who was crowned Miss Teen USA 2022. She is the first contestant from Nebraska to win Miss Teen USA.

== Early life and education ==
Medhi was born and raised in Omaha, Nebraska to an Indian father and an American mother.

== Pageantry ==
=== Miss Nebraska Teen USA 2022 ===
Competing as Miss Omaha Teen USA, Medhi won Miss Nebraska Teen USA in 2022 and was crowned by outgoing titleholder Daisy Sudderth, becoming the first Asian-American Miss Nebraska Teen USA on March 6, 2022, in Omaha, Nebraska.

=== Miss Teen USA 2022 ===
After winning Miss Nebraska Teen USA, she represented Nebraska at Miss Teen USA 2022 and won. She was crowned Miss Teen USA 2022 by the outgoing titleholder, Miss Teen USA 2021, Breanna Myles, becoming the first titleholder of Indian descent.

Awards and achievements
Preceded by Daisy Sudderth	Miss Nebraska Teen USA; 2022	Succeeded by Aubrie Charter
Preceded by Breanna Myles	Miss Teen USA; 2022	Succeeded by UmaSofia Srivastava
