= Miss Florida Teen USA =

- Formation: 1983
- Type: Beauty pageant
- Headquarters: Hollywood
- Location: Florida
- Members: Miss Teen USA
- Official language: English
- Website: Official website

The Miss Florida Teen USA competition is the pageant that selects the representative for the state of Florida in the Miss Teen USA pageant.

Florida ties with Illinois and North Carolina for most Miss Photogenic awards (3). These were won in a successive streak from 1996 to 1998. In 2021, Florida became the 27th state that won the Miss Teen USA title for the first time.

Miss Florida Teen USA and Miss Teen USA's Miss Photogenic in 1997, Cristin Duren, later became Miss Florida USA 2006 and 2004 titleholder Anastagia Pierre was later Miss Florida USA 2009. 1996 winner Kelly Gaudet later won the Miss Florida 2001 title and competed at Miss America.

The current titleholder is Sarah Duncan of Crystal River and was crowned on July 12, 2026, at the Linda W. Chapin Theater in Orlando. She will represent Florida at Miss Teen USA 2026.

== Results summary ==
=== Placements ===
- Miss Teen USA: Breanna Myles (2021)
- Top 10/12: Stefanie Smith (1986), Christy Fatzinger (1994), Corrina Clark (1995), Nicole Broderick (1998), Lou Schieffelin (2018)
- Top 15/16: Jennifer Wooten (2006), Jillian Wunderlich (2008), Alyssa Rivera (2010), Alyssa Khan (2022)

Florida holds a record of 10 placements at Miss Teen USA.

=== Awards ===
- Miss Photogenic: Kelly Gaudet (1996), Cristin Duren (1997), Nicole Broderick (1998)
- Best in State Costume: Kennedie Clinton (2024)

== Winners ==
Color key

- Declared as Winner
- Ended as runner-up
- Ended as one of the finalists or semifinalists

Year	Name	Hometown	Age^{1}	Local title	Placement at Miss Teen USA	Special awards at Miss Teen USA	Notes
2026	Sarah Duncan	Crystal River	17	Miss Crystal River Teen			
2025	Keira Morehead	Windermere	18	Miss Windermere Teen			
2024	Kennedie Clinton	Plant City	18	Miss Plant City Teen		Best in State Costume	
2023	Sharlysse Nelson	Destin	15	Miss Emerald Coast Teen			
2022	Alyssa Khan	Cooper City	18	Miss Cooper City Teen	Top 16		
2021	Breanna Myles	Port St. Lucie	18	Miss Port St. Lucie Teen	Miss Teen USA 2021		
2020	Rylie Spicker	Fort Myers	18	Miss Gainesville Teen			
2019	Katia Gerry	Jacksonville	17	Miss North Florida Teen			
2018	Lou Schieffelin	Winter Park	17	Miss Winter Park Teen	Top 10		Later Miss Florida USA 2025; Top 10 at Miss USA 2025
2017	Victoria DiSorbo	Pembroke Pines	18	Miss Pembroke Pines Teen			Later Miss World America 2023.
2016	Grace Smith	Ponce Inlet	16	Miss Daytona Beach Teen			
2015	Jara Courson	Lake City	18	Miss North Central Florida Teen			
2014	Natalie Fiallo	Pembroke Pines	15	Miss Broward County Fair Teen			
2013	Brianne Bailey	Weston	18	Miss Hollywood Beach Teen			
2012	Sydney Martinez	Lake City	16	Miss Marion County Teen			Originally first runner-up; took over the title after Gracie Simmons resigned
2012	Scarlett Grace "Gracie" Simmons	Crestview	18	Miss Ft. Walton Beach Teen	Did not compete		Resigned
2011	Mikyle Crockett	Jacksonville	18	Miss Jacksonville Teen			
2010	Alyssa Rivera	Miami	17	Miss Treasure Coast Teen	Top 15		
2009	Kayla Collier	Pahokee	18	Miss Treasure Coast Teen			
2008	Jillian Wunderlich	Fort Myers	17	Miss Miami Teen	Top 15		Later Miss Indiana USA 2011; Top 16 at Miss USA 2011
2007	Annilie Hastey	Miami	18	Miss Sunset Place Teen			Appeared on The Price is Right Model Search
2006	Jennifer Wooten	Leesburg	18	Miss Winter Park Teen	Top 15		
2005	Victoria Ratliff	Jasper	18	Miss Tampa Teen			
2004	Anastagia Pierre	Plantation	15	Miss West Broward Teen			Later Miss Florida USA 2009; Later Miss Bahamas Universe 2011
2003	Mary Jeffords	Bradenton	17	Miss Bradenton Teen			
2002	Ashlee Cuza	Sarasota	18	Miss Sarasota Teen			Future actress and model Arielle Kebbel placed first runner-up
2001	Joanna Candelaria	Port Charlotte	18	Miss Port Charlotte Teen			
2000	Tommie Albright	Ormond Beach	17	Miss Ormond Beach Teen			
1999	Michelle Schmotzer	New Smyrna Beach	18	Miss Daytona Beach Teen			
1998	Nicole Broderick	Hallandale	19	Miss Pembroke Pines Teen	Top 10	Miss Photogenic	
1997	Cristin Leigh Duren	Panama City	16	Miss Lyn Haven Teen		Miss Photogenic	Later Miss Florida USA 2006 and 4th runner up at Miss USA 2006, first woman to win Miss Photogenic at Miss Teen USA and Miss USA
1996	Kelly Gaudet	Miami	17	Miss Miami Teen		Miss Photogenic	Later Miss Florida 2001 (Top 10 at Miss America 2002); 4th runner-up to National Sweetheart 1999
1995	Corinna Clark	Temple Terrace	18	Miss Tampa Teen	Top 12		Miss Teen All American 1992
1994	Christy Fatzinger	Dade City	17	Miss Dade City Teen	Top 12		
1993	Allyson McKinney	Jacksonville		Miss Jacksonville Teen			
1992	Jennifer Sutter	Lecanto	17	Miss Lecanto Teen			
1991	Marnie West	Panama City	18				
1990	Michelle Benitez	Perrine	16				
1989	Debbie Knox	Miami					
1988	Holly Nicholson	Sparr	15				
1987	Kimberlee Edwards	Key West	15				
1986	Stefanie Smith	Jacksonville			Top 10		
1985	Erin Townsend	Davie					
1984	Mai-Lis Kuniholm	Coral Gables	17				
1983	Lora Kay Erdman	Winter Park	16				

^{1} Age at the time of the Miss Teen USA pageant
