= Miss Teen USA 1984 =

- Date: April 3, 1984
- Presenters: Michael Young; Heather Thomas
- Venue: Memphis Cook Convention Center, Memphis, Tennessee
- Broadcaster: CBS; WREG-TV
- Entrants: 51
- Placements: 10
- Winner: Cherise Haugen; Illinois
- Congeniality: Robin Swain; Louisiana
- Photogenic: Adrianne Hazelwood; Wisconsin

Miss Teen USA 1984, the 2nd Miss Teen USA pageant, was televised live from Memphis Cook Convention Center, Memphis, Tennessee on 3 April 1984. At the conclusion of the final competition, Cherise Haugen of Illinois was crowned by outgoing titleholder Ruth Zakarian of New York. Zakarian had held the title of Miss Teen USA for just seven months, having been crowned in August 1983.

== Background ==
The pageant was initially set to be hosted in Lakeland, Florida, following the success of Miss Teen USA 1983, as part of a three-year agreement. However, a planned date change to January 1984 conflicted with Super Bowl XVIII, which led the city to swap the event with Miss USA 1984, also organized by the same promoter.

In January the Memphis Area Chamber of Commerce agreed to support the city's bid to host Miss Teen USA 1984 on 3 April. Las Cruces, New Mexico also bid to host the pageant. After Memphis' selection, 1983 winner Ruth Zakarian travelled to the city on 22 February to film promotional material for the pageant.

The short timeframe between the 1983 and 1984 pageants prevented many states from holding new competitions to select representatives. As a result, several states sent their 1983 runners-up to compete in Miss Teen USA 1984.

== Event ==
The preliminary competition took place on March 29, hosted by Michael Young and actress Heather Thomas of The Fall Guy. The televised final competition on April 3 was also hosted by Michael Young, alongside Morgan Brittany of Dallas. Entertainment for the event was provided by the Gatlin Brothers and the Solid Gold Dancers.

== Results ==
=== Placements ===
The 1984 pageant had a top ten, with five finalists.

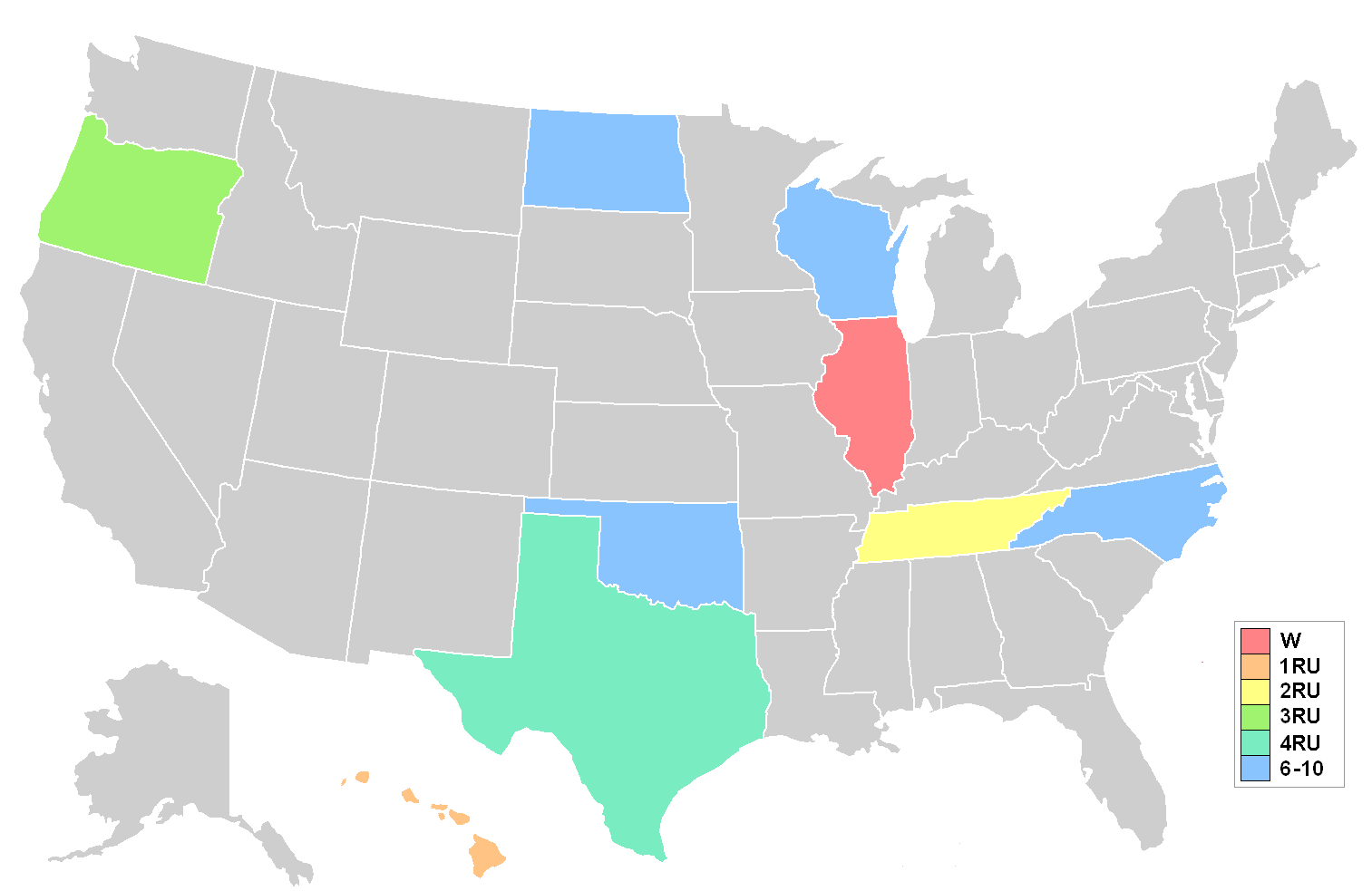
Map showing placements by state

Final results	Contestant
Miss Teen USA 1984	Illinois – Cherise Haugen
1st Runner-Up	Hawaii – Malia Yamamura
2nd Runner-Up	Tennessee – Molly Brown
3rd Runner-Up	Oregon – Dena Woodard
4th Runner-Up	Texas – Charlene Molinar
Top 10	New Mexico – Cheryl Douds; North Carolina – Tracy Cagle; North Dakota – Kari Larson; Oklahoma – Jaime Brashier; Wisconsin – Adrianne Hazelwood

=== Special awards ===
Award	Contestant
Miss Photogenic	Wisconsin – Adrianne Hazelwood
Best state costume	Illinois – Cherise Haugen

== Delegates ==
State/District	Contestant	Age (Note: Ages at the time of the pageant)	Hometown	Placement	Award	Notes	Ref.
Alabama	Teresa Chappell	17	Sterrett				
Alaska	Dawn Goldi	17	Fairbanks				
Arizona	Shana Andrew	17	Mesa		Best State Costume		
Arkansas	Melissa Staples	16	Calion			Later Miss Arkansas USA 1988	
California	Jodie Alvarez	17	San Pedro				
Colorado	Timmithea Rouse	17	Fort Collins				
Connecticut	Monique Savorey	17	Hartford				
Delaware	Heather Reed	18	Wilmington				
District of Columbia	Suzi Singstock	17	Dumfries, Virginia			Later a Playboy playmate and model as Suzi Simpson	
Florida	Mai-Lis Kuniholm	17	Coral Gables				
Georgia	Andrea Randall	17	Marietta				
Hawaii	Malia Yamamura	16	Honolulu	1st runner-up			
Idaho	Laura Bathe	16	Boise				
Illinois	Cherise Haugen	17	Sleepy Hollow	Miss Teen USA		Non-finalist at Miss USA 1984	
Indiana	Christine Harrell	16	Rolling Prairie				
Iowa	Kim Carlson	16	Des Moines				
Kansas	Nancy Mardis	17	Lenexa				
Kentucky	Suzy Neclerio	17	Georgetown				
Louisiana	Robin Swain	17	Baton Rouge		Congeniality		
Maine	Beth Maxwell	16	Portland				
Maryland	Christie Bohraus	17	Bethesda				
Massachusetts	Shawna Pemberton	17	New Bedford				
Michigan	Dawn Downing	17	South Haven				
Minnesota	Heather Johnson	15	Truman				
Mississippi	Mona Bryant	17	Gulfport				
Missouri	Lee Ann Sydenstricker	16	Mexico				
Montana	Pam Miller	17	Columbia Falls				
Nebraska	Cyndi Freymuller	16	Blair				
Nevada	Rana Kirkland	18	Las Vegas				
New Hampshire	Lisa Fernald	15	Hampton				
New Jersey	Tracy Grennon	16	Wyckoff				
New Mexico	Cheryl Douds	17	Las Cruces	Semi-finalist			
New York	Denise Scales	16	Ballston Lake				
North Carolina	Tracy Cagle	17	Waynesville	Semi-finalist			
North Dakota	Kari Larson	18	Bismark	Semi-finalist		Later Miss North Dakota USA 1990	
Ohio	Stephanie Via	17	Beaver Creek				
Oklahoma	Jamie Breashears	17	Sallisaw	Semi-finalist			
Oregon	Dena Woodard	17	Eugene	3rd runner-up			
Pennsylvania	Robin Vish	17	Butler				
Rhode Island	Jennifer Amoroso	16	Narragansett			Later a Playboy playmate and model as Gianna Amore	
South Carolina	Cathy Delgado	17	Florence				
South Dakota	Kim Strom	17	Brandon				
Tennessee	Molly Brown	16	Loretto	2nd runner-up		Later Miss Tennessee USA 1987	
Texas	Charlene Molinar	18	El Paso	4th runner-up			
Utah	Leslie Hunt	17	Fillmore				
Vermont	Darcy Hedrick	17	Bennington				
Virginia	Marcy Brickhouse	16	Virginia Beach				
Washington	Charlene Walcker	17	Lynnwood				
West Virginia	Trina Vitello	18	Richwood				
Wisconsin	Adrianne Hazelwood	16	Glendale	Semi-finalist	Photogenic	Later Miss Connecticut USA 1985	
Wyoming	Allison Faust	16	Gillette				

^{1} Age at the time of the Miss Teen USA pageant

== Judges ==
- Ana Alicia
- Robert Lindgren
- Judi Anderson
- Michael Damian
- Mary Clark
- Michael Tylo
- Marguerite Piazza
- Jim Stuckey
- Shaun Casey
- Vincent DeFrank
- Roxie Roker
