= Miss Teen USA 2021 =

39th edition of the Miss Teen USA competition

- Date: November 27, 2021
- Presenters: Kalani Hilliker; Nicole Adamo
- Venue: Paradise Cove Theater, River Spirit Casino Resort, Tulsa, Oklahoma
- Broadcaster: pageantvision.com
- Entrants: 51
- Placements: 16
- Winner: Breanna Myles; Florida
- Congeniality: Daisy Sudderth (Nebraska)
- Photogenic: Lexi Gryszowka (Indiana)

Miss Teen USA 2021 was the 39th Miss Teen USA pageant, held at the Paradise Cove Theater of River Spirit Casino Resort in Tulsa, Oklahoma, United States, on November 27, 2021.

Ki'ilani Arruda of Hawaii crowned Breanna Myles of Florida as her successor at the end of the event. It was the first year of the competition under Crystle Stewart's directorship. This was the first time since 1988 that the State Costume competition took place before the eve of preliminary competition.

== Background ==
On December 31, 2020, it was announced on Good Morning America that Miss Teen USA and Miss USA would be split from the Miss Universe Organization into a new organization under the helm of Crystle Stewart. Stewart had previously been crowned Miss USA 2008.

=== Location ===
On May 18, 2021, it was confirmed by the Muscogee (Creek) Nation that Miss USA 2021 and Miss Teen USA 2021 would be held at the Paradise Cover Theater of River Spirit Casino Resort in Tulsa, Oklahoma. The competition will span five days, beginning on November 22 and concluding on November 27, 2021.

=== Impact of the COVID-19 pandemic ===
The COVID-19 pandemic impacted the schedule of Miss Teen USA 2020, postponing it from spring 2020 to November 2020. Each state organization had initially planned to schedule their 2021 pageants for the fall 2020 and winter 2020–21, the typical timeframe for state pageants dating back to the 1980s. However, most state pageants were later rescheduled to spring and summer 2021.

2021 state pageants altered due to COVID-19
State	Original date	New date taken
Wisconsin	September 13, 2020	March 20, 2021
Wyoming	September 19, 2020	March 27, 2021
Michigan	September 26, 2020	August 7, 2021
North Dakota	September 26, 2020	April 25, 2021
South Dakota	September 27, 2020	April 25, 2021
Alabama	October 10, 2020	January 10, 2021
Tennessee	October 10, 2020	March 13, 2021
Iowa	October 11, 2020	March 31, 2021
Rhode Island	October 11, 2020	August 8, 2021
Louisiana	October 24, 2020	January 16, 2021
Arkansas	October 25, 2020	May 23, 2021
West Virginia	October 25, 2020	July 11, 2021
Mississippi	October 31, 2020	March 13, 2021
Colorado	November 1, 2020	March 28, 2021
Vermont	November 8, 2020	June 6, 2021
North Carolina	November 7, 2020	February 21, 2021
Vermont	November 8, 2020	June 6, 2021
Hawaii	November 8, 2020	December 10, 2020
Maryland	November 8, 2020	July 25, 2021
Ohio	November 14, 2020	July 10, 2021
Maine	November 15, 2020	June 20, 2021
Georgia	November 21, 2020	February 13, 2021
Oregon	November 21, 2020	March 20, 2021
South Carolina	November 21, 2020	March 6, 2021
Connecticut	November 22, 2020	June 6, 2021
Illinois	November 22, 2020	June 26, 2021
Massachusetts	November 22, 2020	June 13, 2021
New Jersey	November 29, 2020	August 1, 2021
Washington	November 22, 2020	March 21, 2021
Indiana	November 29, 2020	July 26, 2021
New Jersey	November 29, 2020	August 1, 2021
Minnesota	December 6, 2020	April 4, 2021
New Hampshire	December 6, 2020	June 13, 2021
Texas	December 6, 2020	May 31, 2021
Missouri	December 6, 2020	May 1, 2021
Oklahoma	December 20, 2020	April 25, 2021
Arizona	January 10, 2021	July 11, 2021
District of Columbia	January 9, 2021	July 17, 2021
Virginia	January 9, 2021	July 17, 2021
Nevada	January 17, 2021	June 27, 2021
Nebraska	January 10, 2021	May 16, 2021
Kansas	January 17, 2021	March 20, 2021
New York	January 24, 2021	August 20, 2021
Kentucky	January 30, 2021	May 1, 2021

Due to restrictions implemented in all 50 states and the District of Columbia, numerous health and safety guidelines have been implemented for contestants, production members, and audiences at state pageants, such as taking a negative COVID-19 test and following social distancing. Additionally, a number of state pageants have had to alter their initial venue choices due to shut-downs implemented by their governor.

=== Selection of contestants ===
Delegates from 50 states and the District of Columbia will be selected in state pageants which began in September 2020. The first state pageants were Idaho and Montana, held together on their original dates of September 27, 2020, and the last state pageant was California on September 19, 2021.

== Results ==
=== Placements ===
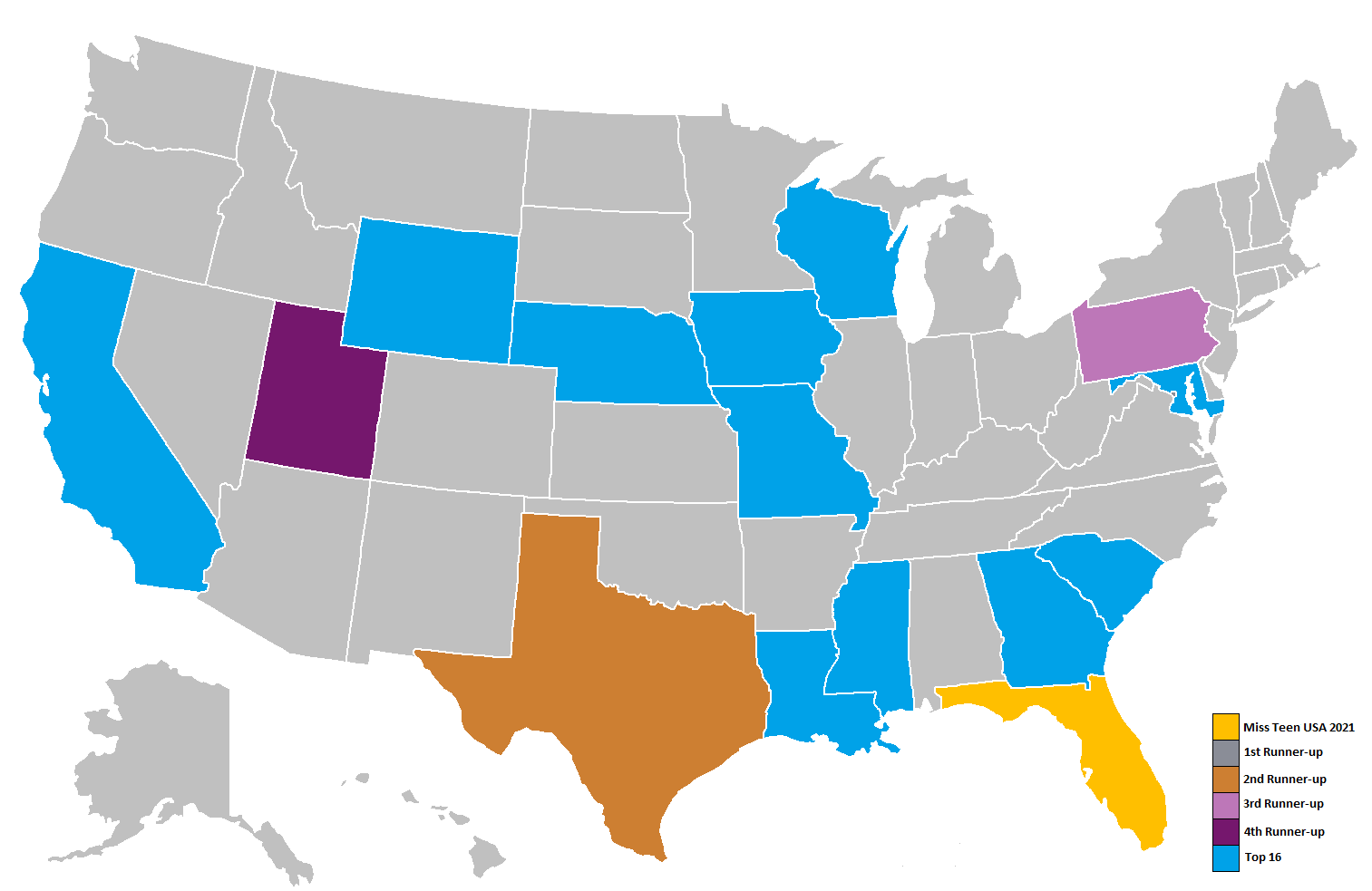
Miss Teen USA 2021 results.

Placement	Contestant
Miss Teen USA 2021	Florida– Breanna Myles
1st Runner-Up	District of Columbia– Hannah Gilliard
2nd Runner-Up	Texas– Landry Davis
3rd Runner-Up	Pennsylvania– Yvonne Burke
4th Runner-Up	Utah– Ayzjiahna Wood
Top 16	California– Cameron Doan; Georgia – Liza Greenberg §; Iowa– Angel Strong; Louisiana– Gracie Petry; Maryland– Maria Derisavi; Mississippi– Mattie Grace Morris; Missouri– Anna Long; Nebraska– Daisy Sudderth; South Carolina– Augusta Roach; Wisconsin– Shreya Gundelly; Wyoming– Teryn Thatcher

§ – Voted into Top 16 through the online vote.

== Pageant ==
=== Judges ===
- Madison Brodsky – entertainment host and author
- Claudia Correa – respiratory therapist
- Chloe Lukasiak – dancer and Dance Moms star
- Joni Rogers-Kante – CEO of SeneGence
- Jérôme LaMaar – fashion designer and creative director

== Contestants ==
All 51 state titleholders have been crowned.

State	Contestant	Age (Note: Ages at the time of the pageant)	Hometown	Placement	Notes
Alabama	Dailyn Swann	18	Greenville		
Alaska	Ellie Smith	18	Anchorage		Daughter of Sarah Smith, Miss Alaska Teen USA 1998
Arizona	McKenzi Lindhag	17	Peoria		
Arkansas	Madeline Bohlman	19	Fayetteville		Later Miss Arkansas USA 2024; Cousin of Miss America 2024 Madison Marsh
California	Cameron Doan	19	Anaheim	Top 16	Previously Miss California's Outstanding Teen 2018
Colorado	Abi Lange	19	Longmont		
Connecticut	Nikitha Kikanamada	19	South Windsor		
Delaware	Sky Knox	19	Newark		Previously Miss Delaware's Outstanding Teen 2018
District of Columbia	Hannah Gilliard	17	Washington, D.C.	1st Runner-Up	
Florida	Breanna Myles	18	Port St. Lucie	Miss Teen USA 2021	
Georgia	Liza Greenberg	19	Peachtree City	Top 16	
Hawaii	Tia Bustamante	19	Kaneohe		
Idaho	Kallie Peck	17	Preston		
Illinois	Gissell Bahena	17	Chicago		
Indiana	Lexi Gryszowka	17	Bloomington		
Iowa	Angel Strong	19	Des Moines	Top 16	Previously competed in Miss Earth USA 2020 (Top 10), Miss Earth USA 2021 (Top 12) & Miss Earth USA 2023 (Miss Earth Fire USA) as Nebraska
Kansas	Madilynn Becker	17	Herington		Later Miss Kansas USA 2026
Kentucky	Kennedy Mosley	17	London		
Louisiana	Gracie Petry	19	Lafayette	Top 16	
Maine	Kyah Brown	16	Poland		
Maryland	Maria Derisavi	18	Leonardtown	Top 16	
Massachusetts	Shannon Malloy	18	Canton		
Michigan	Jada Moylan	17	Hudsonville		Daughter of Sara Dusendang Moylan, Miss Michigan Teen USA 1999
Minnesota	Annika Wiese	18	Owatonna		
Mississippi	Mattie Grace Morris	18	Flowood	Top 16	
Missouri	Anna Long	18	Lake Winnebago	Top 16	
Montana	Katie Tooke	17	Ekalaka		
Nebraska	Daisy Sudderth	18	Omaha	Top 16	
Nevada	Noelani Mendoza	18	Las Vegas		
New Hampshire	Emilee Mills	19	Concord		Daughter of Stephanie Foisy Mills, Miss New Hampshire 1995
New Jersey	Delaney Musgrave	18	Bergenfield		
New Mexico	Emily Lehr	16	Alamogordo		
New York	Geanna Koulouris	19	Bethpage		
North Carolina	Madison Walker	19	Garner		Later semifinalist at Miss North Carolina USA 2023
North Dakota	Aspen Hennessy	18	Des Lacs		
Ohio	Grace-Anne Larschied	17	Lima		
Oklahoma	Hunter Gorton	18	Glenpool		Sister of Taylor Gorton, Miss Oklahoma Teen USA 2008 and Miss Oklahoma USA 2016
Oregon	Mikaela Ochocki	18	Wilsonville		
Pennsylvania	Yvonne Burke	18	Doylestown	3rd Runner-Up	
Rhode Island	Sydney Jaiswal	17	Cranston		
South Carolina	Augusta Roach	18	Easley	Top 16	
South Dakota	Katie Schmit	18	Artesian		
Tennessee	Annie Zhao	17	Memphis		
Texas	Landry Davis	19	Dallas	2nd Runner-Up	
Utah	Ayzjiahna Wood	16	Clearfield	4th Runner-Up	Later Miss Teen Volunteer America 2024
Vermont	Jamisyn Baker	16	Rutland		
Virginia	Alyssa Mawyer	18	Broadway		
Washington	Novalee Lewis	17	Tacoma		Previously Miss Washington's Outstanding Teen 2018
West Virginia	Brylee Knotts	18	Grafton		
Wisconsin	Shreya Gundelly	19	Mequon	Top 16	
Wyoming	Teryn Thatcher	19	Kemmerer	Top 16	
