= Grand Sierra Resort =

Casino hotel in Nevada, United States

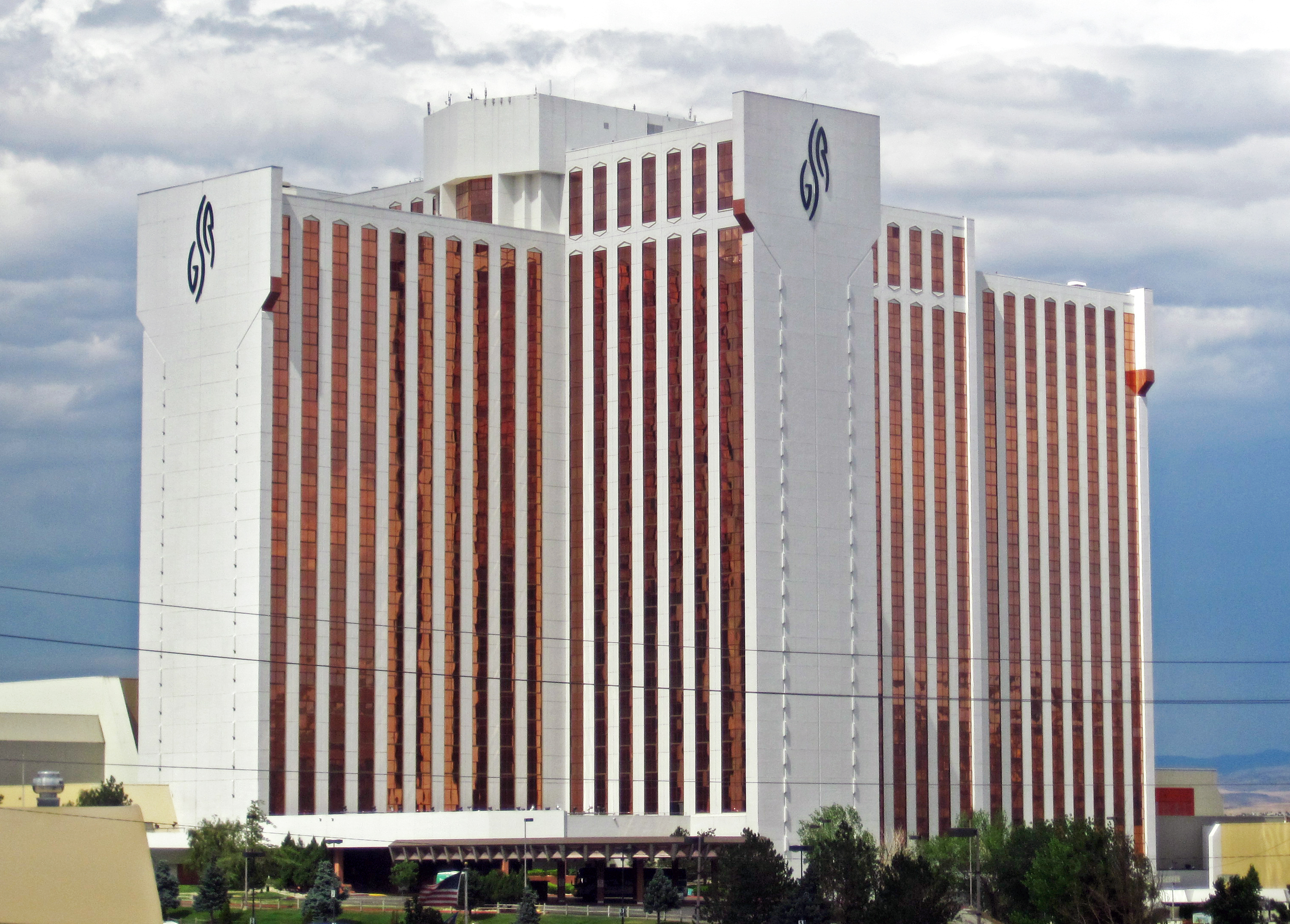
- The Grand Sierra Resort in 2010
- Interactive map of Grand Sierra Resort
- Location: Reno, Nevada, United States; 2500 East Second Street; 39.522854°N 119.779226°W
- Opened: May 3, 1978; 48 years ago
- Theme: Modern
- No. of rooms: 1,990
- Gaming space: 63,584 sq ft (5,907.1 m^{2})
- Signature attractions: Grand Sierra Cinema (1978–2024)
- Notable restaurants: Grand Café; The Grand Buffet; Chickie's & Pete's; Charlie Palmer Steak; Uno Más Street Tacos + Spirits
- Owner: Meruelo Enterprises
- Architect: Martin Stern Jr. and Associates; Worth Group
- Previous names: MGM Grand Reno (1978–1986); Bally's Reno (1986–1992); Reno Hilton (1992–2006)
- Renovated in: 1981, 2012, 2013, 2014
- Website: grandsierraresort.com

Grand Sierra Resort (formerly MGM Grand Reno, Bally's Reno and Reno Hilton) is a hotel and casino located approximately three miles east of Downtown Reno, Nevada, United States. The hotel has 1,990 guest rooms and suites, 27 floors, 12 restaurants, including Charlie Palmer Steak by celebrity chef Charlie Palmer, and a casino with 80,000 sq ft (7,400 m^{2}) of space. GSR has a movie theater, a Race & Sports Book, nightclubs including LEX Nightclub, a 25,000 sq ft (2,300 m^{2}) venue with a swimming pool, lake golf driving range, an RV park and an ice rink. It is owned and operated by Downey, California based company headed by Meruelo Enterprises.

== History ==
=== MGM Grand (1978–1986) ===
In 1975, Metro-Goldwyn-Mayer began to scout out Reno locations for their proposed high rise hotel-casino, which they planned to model after its high-profile Las Vegas casino, the MGM Grand. Following approval by City Council, MGM purchased land between Mill and 2nd Streets, at that time a gravel pit. Groundbreaking occurred in the Summer of 1976 and construction began on the 26-story, 1,015 room property that would then be one of the largest in the world. After two years of fast-tracked construction, the building opened with fanfare, fashion and media attention on May 3, 1978.

In the Summer of 1981, MGM opened an expansion of the hotel with a 26-story wing plus an additional 900 rooms, making a total of 2,001 rooms and suites. Three years later in November 1984 MGM revealed plans to expand the Reno hotel further: a $60 million 26 story wing with another 954 rooms, which never materialized. After fights and issues with the City Council, the expansion was later approved on September 23, 1985, amid rumors the MGM would be sold. Less than five months later on November 16, 1985, those rumors proved to be true with Bally Manufacturing announcing that it would acquire the Reno and Las Vegas MGM's for $440 million, further questioning the newly approved expansion for Reno.

=== Bally's (1986–1992) ===
Bally's Reno logo (1986–1992)

The increased purchase price transaction was completed in April 1986 and MGM Grand Reno became Bally's Reno, the price to purchase the MGM assets came out being more than $550 million. The expansion for Reno was delayed indefinitely leaving the current structure with 2,001 rooms. On April 18, 1989, Bally's shut down the popular Donn Arden production "Hello Hollywood Hello" that was created for the MGM Reno. It closed after 11 years and performances in front of more than 7 million people. It remains still the longest-running production show to ever play in Reno. In 1990 Wall-Street began to tout financial problems with Bally Manufacturing; but in July 1990, they refute the claim and announce they will continue to operate the hotel-casinos. Three months later in October 1990, it became known that Bally's was struggling with $1.8 billion in debts and announced a plan to restructure and reorganize to keep Bally's Reno operating. After two years of sluggish operations, on February 27, 1992, Bally Manufacturing, parent company of Bally's, filed for bankruptcy. In March, the hotel was placed on the market in an attempt to aid their debt by unloading the non-revenue producing Bally's Reno, sister hotel Bally's Las Vegas was far more superior in terms of revenues. Quickly, bidding began between Hilton Hotels Inc and Harveys Casino. The bidding went on until June 1992 when Hilton put an end to the fight, bidding $83 million. The transaction took a few weeks to complete.

=== Reno Hilton (1992–2006) ===
Reno Hilton logo (1992–2006)

On July 31, 1992, Bally's Reno became officially the Reno Hilton.

Free of financial problems and immediately after the sale, Hilton began investing $86 million worth of renovations in 1994/1995 to transform completely the interior and exterior of the hotel and direct the theme towards a more Western image. In December 1993, during the renovations, Hilton confirmed that it was looking into building a 1,000 room addition. The Reno Hilton's ownership was a series of managers and company names; it was Hilton Hotel Inc. from 1992 to 1999 when Hilton spun off its gaming operations into a separate company called Park Place Entertainment. Then in 2003, following a 2001 purchase of Caesars World, Park Place changed its name to Caesars Entertainment, with Hilton still holding an affiliation with the company. Around this time, the Reno Hilton was again being renovated. In May 2005, it became known that Caesars Entertainment, which was pending in a merger with Harrah's Entertainment, had to disassociate all hotels under the Hilton brand as Hilton had removed itself from the company and did not want to become part of the merger. Consequently, the property was placed on the market and quickly picked up by a group of investors known as the Grand Sierra Resort Corp. The purchase price was $151 million.

The transaction from Caesars Entertainment to GSR Corp involving the $151 million sale of the Reno Hilton was lengthy. The sale was announced in early May 2005 but was not completed until June 2006 due to finance and licensing problems.

=== Grand Sierra Resort (2006–present) ===
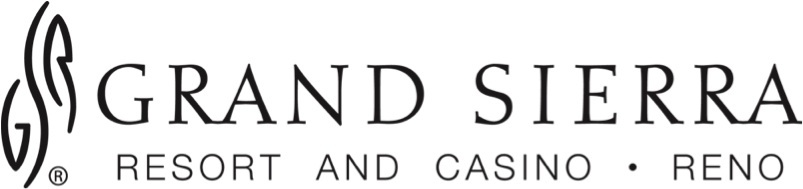
Grand Sierra Resort logo (2006–2012)

After all problems were addressed with all parties involved, the Reno Hilton became the Grand Sierra Resort and Casino on June 24, 2006.

During the first ownership of the Grand Sierra Resort nearly $100 million was spent to convert the property into the new brand. The money was spent on reconfiguration of the public areas, a new swimming pool area, update for the casino that included keeping the original MGM-like ceilings, a refreshed hotel lobby and converting floors 17–27 into "hotel-condos" called The Summit. The company had larger-scale expansion plans that included a water park, boutique shopping, a water and laser show, 48-story condominium high-rises and further renovations. Those never came to fruition. Briefly, the hotel was home to Nikki Beach nightlife and Ashton Kutcher's Dolce Enoteca restaurant. In October 2008, in the midst of the economic crises, GSR's ownership or group of investors failed to make payments on their loans with their financier, JPMorgan, essentially bankrupt, the bank foreclosed on the 2,001 room hotel/casino and assumed ownership, assigning it to their affiliate Credit Markets Real Estate Holdings to oversee operations. That affiliate brought on Las Vegas-based management companies such as Catalyst, who flips struggling hotel/casinos and makes them attractive to a buyer. Those companies, including the Navegante Group and Santo Gaming, both Las Vegas based, continued to make improvements to the resort such as adding or replacing restaurants. The hotel/condo program was eliminated and settlements with buyers are ongoing to this day, the renovated rooms above the 17th floor that are non-private owned rent as hotel rooms.

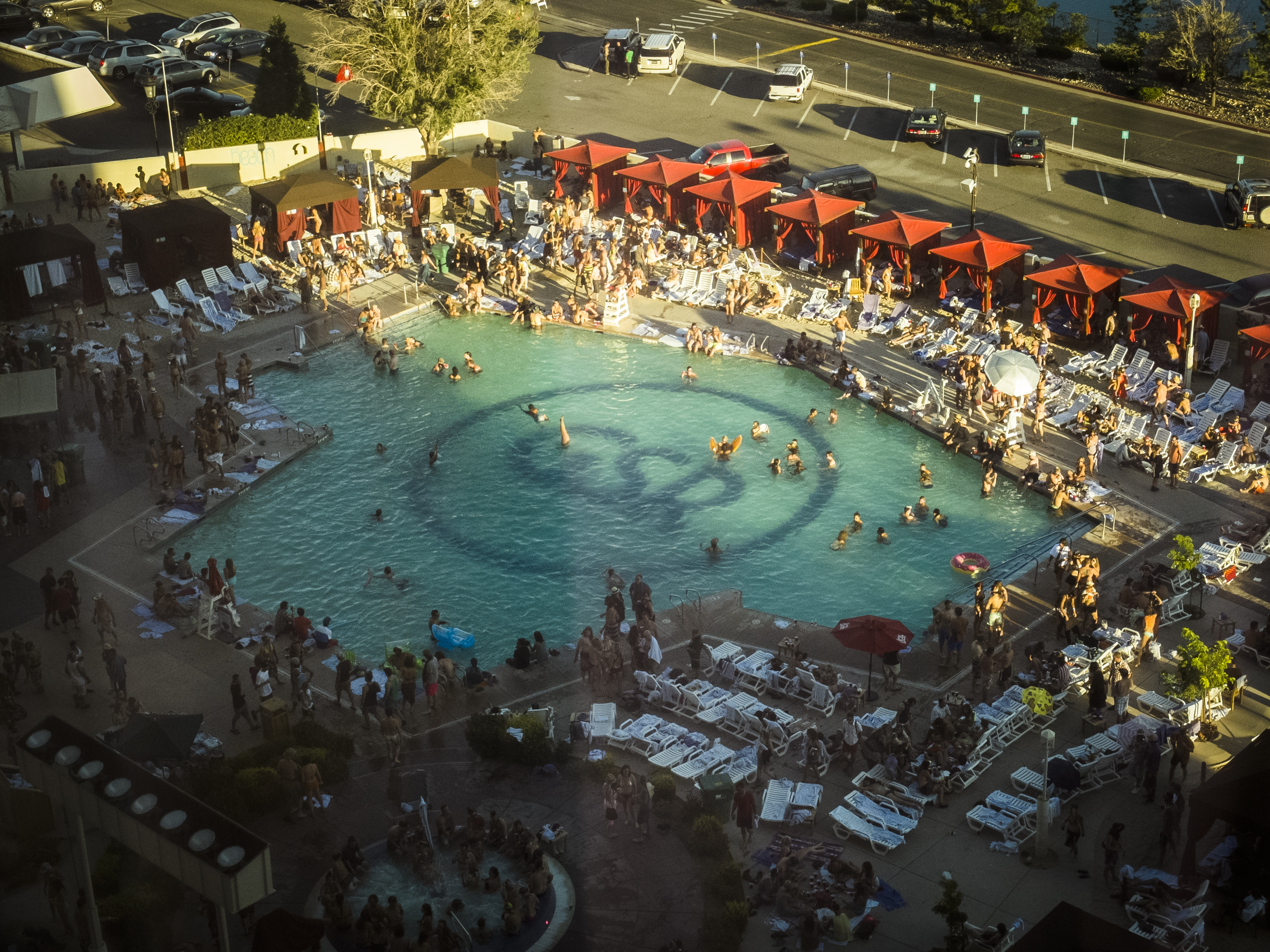
The pool at the Grand Sierra Resort

In 2009, The Meruelo Group began looking at the property with an interest to purchase it. CEO Alex Meruelo was intrigued by the property's potential to truly become an elite destination resort. After negotiations between Meruelo and JPMorgan, a deal was reached to sell the 145-acre site for only $42 million. This payment was made in cash, and the deal was announced in February 2011. Quickly, the deal closed after regulatory approval in April 2011. Out of bank ownership, Meruelo pledged to continually make improvements. Not gamers, Meruelo, owner of successful restaurant chains, TV stations and construction companies, was now in the business of hotel/casinos. He brought on seasoned management from Las Vegas to help in his effort to rebrand the property. In August 2011, the company announced a multi-phase $25 million improvement program that would renovate the casino, hotel lobby, rooms and restaurants. In August 2012, that program was completed. Favoring bright and modern versus elegant and dark. Even with the first round of renovations completed, Meruelo was not stopping their improvements with renovations to their sports book, a new Spa, new stores and a $14 million nightclub opened in 2014. For the first time in the property's 30-year history, exterior enhancements were made in 2014. Another renovation for the meeting space occurred in the summer of 2015.

==== Expansion plans ====
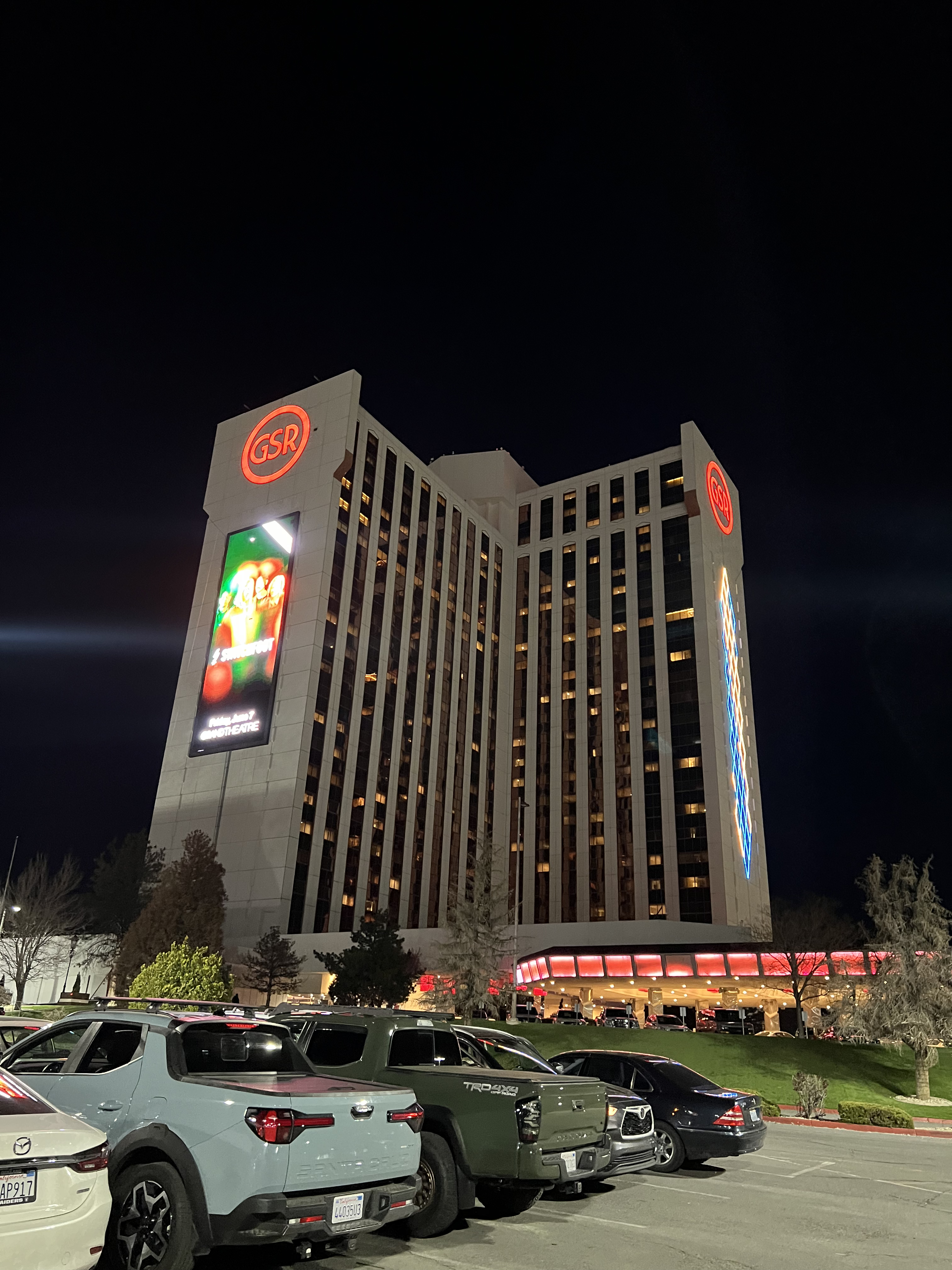
The resort as seen at night in 2024

On September 27, 2023, the resort announced a 10-year, $1 billion-plus expansion project. Among the most notable features are a new 800-room hotel tower, 300 residential units intended for workforce housing, and a 10,000-seat arena that would become the new home of the University of Nevada men's basketball team. (Note: The university's current on-campus arena, the Lawlor Events Center, will remain in use for women's basketball.) In July 2025, the Grand Sierra Resort selected Martin-Harris Construction as the contractor for the arena. A groundbreaking ceremony for the arena took place in September 2025, with the arena set to open in autumn of 2027.

==== 2025 shooting ====
On July 28, 2025, a gunman, identified as 26-year-old Dakota Hawver of Reno, opened fire with a 9mm Glock handgun at around 7:25 a.m. outside near the valet area and possibly other parts of the property, killing three men (Andrew Canepa (33), Justin Aguila (33), and Angel Martinez (66)) and injuring three other men (Matt Sitler (33), Dylan McLean (33), one unidentified) before being shot and injured by responding officers. Police closed the northwest valet area and parking entrance to investigate the shooting. The perpetrator died a few days later from police-related injuries after the shooting. News outlets reported that Hawver had behavioral issues in his previous relationship with his ex-girlfriend, who lived across the highway from the resort.

== Attractions ==
=== Casino ===
Grand Sierra has the largest casino floor in Reno and Northern Nevada with over 80,000 square feet of slots, video poker, table games and a race and sports book. It has been recently renovated with new carpet, table game decor, slot chairs and new lighting.

=== Fun Quest ===
Fun Quest is the resort's family entertainment center. Attractions in the FEC include a Laser Tag arena.

=== Grand Bay Driving Range ===
Grand Bay Driving Range is located at the southeast corner of the resort property along the north shore of the Grand Bay. The outdoor range features eight island greens, each varying in distance and difficulty, dotted along a large body of water.

=== Grand Theatre ===
A 2,995-seat concert and show venue, the renovated historic MGM Grand-Reno's Ziegfeld Stage, is home to the world's largest indoor stage with more than a full acre of usable space. The theater was constructed to host MGM's "Hello Hollywood Hello" Production from 1978 to 1987. The Meruelo Group remodeled the Grand Theatre at Grand Sierra Resort. The Miss USA and Miss Teen USA competitions were held here in 2019, 2022 and 2023.

=== Former Attractions ===
==== Jai Alai ====
Upon opening in 1978, the property featured a $2 million, 2,000-seat Jai alai fronton, one of two frontons on the West Coast, the other being at the MGM's sister property MGM Grand in Las Vegas. The sport enjoyed modest support from locals, however, daily attendance averaged at 678 a night, with 300–400 on weeknights. After only two and a half years of operation, and despite efforts by MGM management to increase interest in the sport (even approaching television stations in the San Francisco Bay Area with a proposal for a weekly jai alai television program) Jai alai matches were permanently ended on November 2, 1980. For several months after the closure, the protective screen separating spectators from the playing area remained up while the venue was used for other purposes, such as Boxing and Gymnastics, giving hope to fans that the sport would return.

In August 1982, it was announced the fronton would be renovated into a 2,300-seat theater that would be leased to a production company operated by former screen and theater actor Eddie Bracken, which promised to bring traveling Broadway productions to the venue. In July 1983, the project was announced to be delayed due to issues securing $5 million for renovation of the fronton into a performance venue. At the time, MGM Grand management claimed plans to convert the room to a theater had been "put on the backburner".

In December 1984, MGM Grand management announced it planned on converting the fronton space into convention space, the same fate the fronton at the MGM Grand in Las Vegas met the previous year. The following year, the fronton was demolished, the seating removed, and the floor leveled to create the 48,000 square foot, 5,000-seat Goldwyn Ballroom (Today's Summit Pavilion.)

=== Grand Sierra Cinema ===
Grand Sierra Cinema (formerly MGM Grand Theatres, Bally's Theatre and Keystone Cinemas) was a two auditorium theater located in the lower level mall that was opened on May 20, 1978, and was the last business name changed on December 14, 2006. The theater featured movies that recently left mainstream theaters but haven't yet reached DVD for just $6. Movies were played once on weeknights and twice on weekend nights. Bloomhuff Theatres shut down the location on August 25, 2024.

== Events ==
The Grand Sierra is home to the local furry convention, aptly named Biggest Little Fur Con, since its inception in 2013.

== See also ==
- List of integrated resorts
