= Orange Pavilion =

Multi-purpose arena in California

Coordinates: 34.088164°N 117.29211°W

Orange Pavilion is a multi-purpose arena on the grounds of the NOS Events Center in San Bernardino, California.
