= Miss Teen USA =

Beauty contest

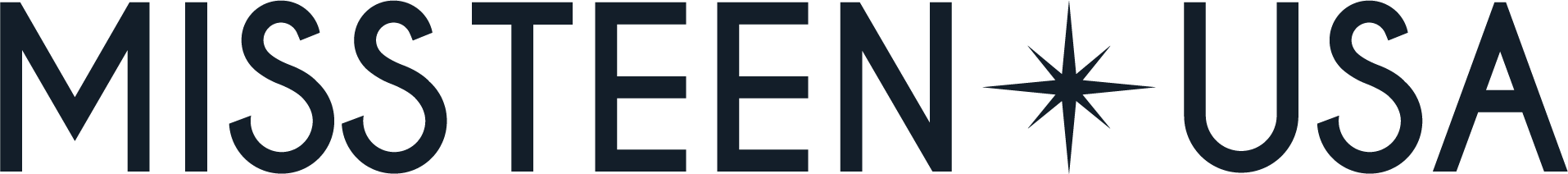
- Type: Beauty pageant
- Parent organization: Miss Universe Organization
- Headquarters: New York City
- Country represented: United States
- Qualifies for: Miss Teen Universe (2026 – Present)
- First edition: 1983
- Most recent edition: 2026
- Current titleholder: Kiran Reddy; Georgia
- Owners: Jakkaphong Jakrajutatip (2022 – Present); Raul Rocha (2024 – Present)
- President, Chairman, CEO: Thom Brodeur
- Affiliates: Microsoft; Sony Interactive Entertainment
- Language: English
- Website: missteenusa.com

Miss Teen USA is a beauty pageant that has been run since 1983 by the Miss Universe Organization for girls aged 14–19 years old as of January 1st of the competition year. They must be US citizens, and cannot have been married, pregnant, or have children. Like its sister pageant Miss USA, it is televised on The CW television network starting in 2024, after being streamed online for several years. Since 2026, the winner of Miss Teen USA represents the USA at Miss Teen Universe. The pageants are currently operated by Thom Brodeur.

Prior to 1983, a beauty contest bestowing the title of Miss Teen USA was first held in 1959 as a mail-in photo contest by Teen magazine.

It next became an annual live stage event through the 1960s and in 1983, the pageant began being produced annually as part of the Miss Universe family of pageants. It was broadcast live on CBS until 2002 and then on NBC from 2003 to 2007. In March 2007, it was announced that the broadcast of the Miss Teen USA pageant on NBC had not been renewed, and that Miss Teen USA 2007 would be the final televised event.

From 2008 to 2015, the pageant was held at the Atlantis Paradise Island Resort, located in Nassau, Bahamas. Since 2016, the pageant has been held in the United States once more, and since 2018, it is held concurrently with its sister Miss USA pageant in a single city a few days before the start of Miss USA final competition.

Notable pageant winners include actresses Kelly Hu (1985, Hawaii), Bridgette Wilson (1990, Oregon), Charlotte Lopez (1993, Vermont), Vanessa Minnillo (1998, South Carolina) and Shelley Hennig (2004, Louisiana).

The current Miss Teen USA is Kiran Reddy of Georgia, who was crowned on August 26, 2026 at the Adrienne Arsht Center for the Performing Arts in Miami, Florida.

== History ==
=== 1959 to 1982 ===
==== 1959 ====
Prior to becoming part of the Miss Universe pageant system in 1983 and current ownership by Thom Brodeur, the title of "Miss Teen USA" was bestowed upon the winner of an annual competition in the United States from 1959 onward, with Peggy Collins, 17, of Lake Charles, Louisiana winning the honor that first year in a contest created by Teen magazine. Celebrity judges for the mail-in photo competition included Paul Newman, Robert Wagner, Shirley MacLaine, Janet Leigh, producer Jerry Wald, and fashion designer Edith Head.

==== 1962 to 1968 ====
The pageant continued from 1962 to 1968 which saw made debut as annual live stage event.

The 1962 Miss Teen USA was named at the Teen-Age Fair, a ten-day event, over the Easter holiday, in April, held at the Pacific Ocean Park in Santa Monica, California, which had 32 teenaged girls from across the United States participating and Linda Henning, a 15-year-old from Sioux Falls, South Dakota, was named Miss Teen USA for 1962. She was crowned by television comedian Soupy Sales.

Ohio teenager Judy Adams, 16, was Miss Teen USA for 1963. The four-day event was held at the Teen-Age Fair on the grounds of the 15-acre Pickwick Recreation Center in Burbank, California, with girls age 14 to 18 representing all 50 states competing. Pickwick Recreation Center was Gay's Pickwick Swim Park and is now called Pickwick Gardens.

The winner of Miss Teen USA 1964 was Nancy Spry of Van Nuys, California. Bob Eubanks hosted the televised 1964 pageant, with actor Sebastian Cabot one of the guests.

Singer Bobby Darin crowned 1965's Miss Teen USA in April, at the Hollywood Palladium, who was Susan Henning, an 18-year-old student attending Long Beach, California State College.

Miss Teen USA in 1966 was Cindy Lewis. The 1967 pageant was hosted by Sam Riddle and held at the Hollywood Palladium in March.

The pageant in 1968 was held on Saturday, April 13, 1968, in Hollywood and was won by Pamela Martin, 18, from Birmingham, Michigan.

In 1969, local "Miss Teen" winners in the western United States; for example, "Miss Teen Burbank," "Miss Teen Sherman Oaks," "Miss Teen Van Nuys," et al., competed in a regional competition for the title of "Miss Teen Western United States," with the winner earning a spot at the Miss Teen USA pageant, which was held on April 3, 1969, again at the Hollywood Palladium.

Before the Miss Teen USA pageant became part of the Miss Universe system in 1983, titleholders of "Miss Teen USA" in the 1960s either competed as contestants or made appearances at the annual Miss Teen International pageant in Hollywood.

==== 1970 to 1979 ====
The history of the Miss Teen USA pageant during the 1970s is less clear. The pageant in the late 1970s was moved to November and as a result the winner was crowned Miss Teen USA for the upcoming year rather than the year that had just past and in which the pageant was held.

In 1978, the pageant to select the 1979 titleholder was held in late November in Miami, Florida during the Thanksgiving holiday week.

In August 1979, the Associated Press wire service ran a multi-part newspaper series over three consecutive days on beauty pageants, which included Miss Teen USA. The series stated that a company called "Miss Teen USA Corp" was formed in 1979, which oversaw the national pageant and in-house and franchised state-level Miss Teen USA pageants. The Miss Teen USA pageant was registered in 1979 to operate under its trade name in the states of New Jersey and Virginia, according to the Burlington County, New Jersey Consumer Affairs Office, which had received inquiries from the public about the legitimacy of it and two other pageants, Miss U.S. Teen-age and Miss National Teen-age, the latter which was not registered but had held a pageant recently.

Included among the many state-level Miss Teen USA pageants in 1979 were Alaska, Hawaii, New Jersey, North Carolina, Tennessee, and West Virginia. The winner in 1979 of the national Miss Teen USA title received a $15,000 scholarship, while state titleholders received a $500 scholarship.

==== 1980 to 1982 ====
Miss Teen USA for 1980 was Susan McDannold, 19, of St. Albans, West Virginia, who was crowned on December 1, 1979.

Miss Teen USA for 1981 was Tammy Jo Hopkins, 17, of Omaha, Nebraska, who was crowned on November 22, 1980, and who entered as 1980 Miss Nebraska Teen. The Miss Teen USA pageant in late November 1980, in which Hopkins won the 1981 title, was held in Albuquerque, New Mexico. Tammy Jo Hopkins did not have a full year's reign as 1981 Miss Teen USA. She relinquished her crown and title to 1980 Miss Teen USA winner Susan McDannold after accepting a print modeling and TV commercial acting representation contract with a top model agency in New York City (as Tammy Hopkins). McDannold then completed the remainder of the title year as Miss Teen USA for 1981. Susan McDannold is the only Miss Teen USA to ever hold the title twice.

Hugrun Ragnarsson, 18, was crowned 1982 Miss Teen USA in late November 1981. After this pageant, the Miss Universe Organization decided to award the title for the year in which the pageant was held, so the next pageant, held during the summer of 1983 on August 30, was crowned the 1983 Miss Teen USA winner.

Miss Universe, Inc. filed a lawsuit on July 18, 1979, in the United States District Court for the Northern District of Georgia, Atlanta Division, against the company running the late-1970s version of the pageant, Miss Teen U.S.A., Inc., for trademark infringement over a claimed similarity with its own "Miss U.S.A." pageant title and some of its related registered trademarks. The lawsuit, Miss Universe, Inc. v. Miss Teen U.S.A., Inc., resulted initially in an injunction being issued on March 25, 1980, ordering Miss Teen U.S.A., Inc. to cease holding future pageants with the name "Miss Teen U.S.A." so as not to confuse people with the "Miss U.S.A." pageant. The injunction was appealed but eventually upheld. The court ruling did not invalidate any past Miss Teen USA titleholders. Miss Universe, Inc. itself did not receive a U.S. trademark registration for "Miss Teen USA" until the next decade, in 1991 (see next section). The final winner of the Miss Teen USA title before the Miss Universe Organization began its own version of the pageant was the 1982 Miss Teen USA title won by Hugrun Ragnarsson.

=== 1983 to present ===
A revised Miss Teen USA pageant, once again designed for television, was added to the Miss Universe system of pageants in 1983 by Miss Universe, Inc. which at the time was run by Harold Glasser, and was first broadcast live under that corporate ownership on the CBS television network on August 30, 1983.

Miss Universe, Inc., a California Corporation, filed a U.S. Trademark application for the service marks "Miss Teen USA" and "Miss Teen — U.S.A." on November 14, 1983, and, after eight years of proceedings and challenges by other pageants, was finally approved and registered on October 8, 1991.

==== 2020s ====
In 2015, the then owners of record, Miss Universe L.P., assigned all trademark rights to the names "Miss Teen USA," "Miss USA," "Miss Universe," and others, to IMG Universe, LLC. The company IMG Universe, LLC, a subsidiary of IMG, manages the latter's pageant-related intellectual property and licensing agreements. IMG's parent company is Endeavor. The parent company of the Miss Universe Organization is also Endeavor.

In the summer of 2020, the Miss Universe organization and IMG Universe, LLC licensed future annual operation of the Miss Teen USA and Miss USA pageants to Crystle Stewart, who was Miss USA 2008. The first competitions of the licensed pageants under her directorship are the 2021 productions.

In October 2022, IMG assigned all trademark rights to the names "Miss Teen USA," "Miss USA," "Miss Universe," and others, to JKN Metaverse Inc., a subsidiary of JKN Global Group.

In August 2023, it was announced that Crystle Stewart had stepped down as president of the Miss USA Organization. She was replaced by fashion designer Laylah Rose.

On May 8, 2024, UmaSofia Srivastava, then Miss Teen USA 2023, resigned from her title, stating that her values no longer aligned with the direction of the organization. Her resignation came two days after the resignation of Miss USA 2023 Noelia Voight, and amid allegations of ill-treatment, abuse, and bullying within the Miss USA organization. The revelations came to light when Srivastava's mother, Barbara, addressed the issue on Good Morning America, suggesting her daughter's dream job had turned into a nightmare. Srivastava's first runner-up, Stephanie Skinner of New York, declined the position, and as a result, and the title remained vacant up until the 2024 competition.

On September 4, 2025, longtime pageant coach Thom Brodeur announced on Instagram that he had acquired the Miss USA and Miss Teen USA pageants as the new president, chairman, and CEO. Despite Rose stating on the official Miss USA accounts that she was still the owner, the Miss Universe Organization later issued a press release affirming that Brodeur had in fact acquired the exclusive licenses to the pageants.

On April 21, 2026, BDE Miss USA, LLC, the franchise owner of the Miss USA and Miss Teen USA Organization had announced a landmark international partnership with the Miss Teen Universe Organization, allowing the winner of Miss Teen USA to compete at the Miss Teen Universe pageant. Under the agreement, Miss Teen USA will now serve as the official United States representative at Miss Teen Universe, the most prestigious international beauty competition for teens aged 14–18.

== Pageant editions ==
The following is a list of Miss Teen USA pageant editions and information during the era when it was run by or associated with the Miss Universe Organization, including to the present day.

Year	Date	Edition	Venue	Entrants
1983	August 30	1st	Lakeland Civic Center, Lakeland, Florida	51
1984	April 3	2nd	Memphis Cook Convention Center, Memphis, Tennessee	51
1985	January 22	3rd	James L. Knight Center, Miami, Florida	51
1986	January 21	4th	Ocean Center, Daytona Beach, Florida	51
1987	July 21	5th	El Paso Civic Center, El Paso, Texas	51
1988	July 25	6th	Orange Pavilion, San Bernardino, California	51
1989	July 25	7th	Orange Pavilion, San Bernardino, California	51
1990	July 16	8th	Mississippi Coast Coliseum, Biloxi, Mississippi	51
1991	August 19	9th	Mississippi Coast Coliseum, Biloxi, Mississippi	51
1992	August 25	10th	Mississippi Coast Coliseum, Biloxi, Mississippi	50
1993	August 10	11th	Mississippi Coast Coliseum, Biloxi, Mississippi	51
1994	August 16	12th	Mississippi Coast Coliseum, Biloxi, Mississippi	51
1995	August 15	13th	Century II Convention Center, Wichita, Kansas	51
1996	August 21	14th	Pan American Center, Las Cruces, New Mexico	51
1997	August 20	15th	South Padre Island Convention Centre, South Padre Island, Texas	51
1998	August 17	16th	Hirsch Memorial Coliseum, Shreveport, Louisiana	51
1999	August 24	17th	Hirsch Memorial Coliseum, Shreveport, Louisiana	51
2000	August 26	18th	Hirsch Memorial Coliseum, Shreveport, Louisiana	51
2001	August 22	19th	South Padre Island Convention Centre, South Padre Island, Texas	51
2002	August 28	20th	South Padre Island Convention Centre, South Padre Island, Texas	51
2003	August 12	21st	Palm Springs Convention Center, Palm Springs, California	51
2004	August 6	22nd	Palm Springs Convention Center, Palm Springs, California	51
2005	August 8	23rd	Baton Rouge River Center, Baton Rouge, Louisiana	51
2006	August 15	24th	Palm Springs Convention Center, Palm Springs, California	51
2007	August 24	25th	Pasadena Civic Auditorium, Pasadena, California	51
2008	August 16	26th	Grand Ballroom, Atlantis Paradise Island, Nassau, The Bahamas	51
2009	July 31	27th	Imperial Ballroom, Atlantis Paradise Island, Nassau, The Bahamas	51
2010	July 24	28th	Imperial Ballroom, Atlantis Paradise Island, Nassau, The Bahamas	51
2011	July 16	29th	Grand Ballroom, Atlantis Paradise Island, Nassau, The Bahamas	51
2012	July 28	30th	Grand Ballroom, Atlantis Paradise Island, Nassau, The Bahamas	51
2013	August 10	31st	Grand Ballroom, Atlantis Paradise Island, Nassau, The Bahamas	51
2014	August 2	32nd	Grand Ballroom, Atlantis Paradise Island, Nassau, The Bahamas	51
2015	August 22	33rd	Grand Ballroom, Atlantis Paradise Island, Nassau, The Bahamas	51
2016	July 30	34th	Venetian Theatre, The Venetian Las Vegas, Las Vegas, Nevada	51
2017	July 29	35th	Phoenix Symphony Hall, Phoenix, Arizona	51
2018	May 18	36th	Hirsch Memorial Coliseum, Shreveport, Louisiana	51
2019	April 28	37th	Grand Sierra Resort, Reno, Nevada	51
2020	November 7	38th	Graceland, Memphis, Tennessee	51
2021	November 27	39th	Paradise Cove Theater, River Spirit Casino Resort, Tulsa, Oklahoma	51
2022	October 1	40th	Grand Sierra Resort, Reno, Nevada	51
2023	September 29	41st	Grand Sierra Resort, Reno, Nevada	51
2024	August 3	42nd	Peacock Theater, Los Angeles, California	51
2025	October 23	43rd	Grand Sierra Resort, Reno, Nevada	51
2026	August 26	44th	Adrienne Arsht Center for the Performing Arts, Miami, Florida	51

== Competition rounds ==
Prior to the final telecast the delegates compete in the preliminary competition, which involves private interviews with the judges and a presentation show where they compete in swimsuit and evening gown.

During the final competition, the semi-finalists are announced and go on to compete in swimsuit and evening gown. From 1983 to 2002 all semi-finalists also competed in an interview competition as well as both swimsuit and evening gown, followed by one or two final interview questions. In 2003, a new format was introduced where the top fifteen competed in evening gown, the top ten competed in swimsuit and the top five competed in the final question. In 2006, the order of competition was changed where the top fifteen competed in swimsuit and the top ten in evening gown. The latest competition format was used since 2008 the final not broadcast on TV, where the top fifteen both competed in swimsuit and evening gown, and the top five competed in the final question who all signed up by a panel of judges.

Former Miss Teen USA Katherine Haik supported calls to eliminate the swimsuit competition. The swimsuit category was chastised for exploiting and sexualizing young women and not promoting diverse body types. The new activewear portion would increase the focus on wellness and health of young ladies.

== Recent titleholders ==
Year	State	Name	Venue	Placement at Miss Teen Universe
2026	Georgia	Kiran Reddy	Miami, Florida	4th Runner-Up
2025	Missouri	Mailyn Marsh	Reno, Nevada	Did not send representative
2024	Mississippi	Addie Carver	Los Angeles, California	Did not send representative
2023	New Jersey	UmaSofia Srivastava (resigned)	Reno, Nevada	Did not send representative
2022	Nebraska	Faron Medhi	Reno, Nevada	Did not send representative

== Delegates ==
- Brandi Sherwood (Miss Teen USA 1989), Ashley Coleman (Miss Teen USA 1999) and Claudia Jordan (Miss Rhode Island Teen USA 1990) have been Barker's Beauties on The Price Is Right.
  - Jordan has also been a suitcase model on Deal or No Deal.
- Erika Shay (Miss Pennsylvania Teen USA 1995, season 5), Christie Lee Woods (Miss Teen USA 1996, seasons 5 and season 31), Nicole O'Brian (Miss Texas Teen USA 2000, season 5) and Caitlin Upton (Miss South Carolina Teen USA 2007, season 16) have all appeared on The Amazing Race.
  - In addition, Woods also had a brief career in television in The New Adventures of Robin Hood.
- Macy Erwin, Miss Tennessee Teen USA 2007 appeared on America's Prom Queen
- Misty Giles (Miss Texas Teen USA 1999, Panama), Danni Boatwright (Miss Kansas Teen USA 1992, Guatemala, Winners at War) and Angelia Layton (Miss Utah Teen USA 2010, Philippines) have all participated on Survivor.
  - Boatwright represented Kansas at Miss Teen USA in 1992 and was 2nd runner-up to Jamie Solinger. Four years later, she represented Kansas again at Miss USA in 1996, and was 1st runner-up to Ali Landry. In 2005, she appeared on Survivor: Guatemala and won the $1 million first-place prize, beating out Stephenie LaGrossa at the final tribal council.
- Caroline Lunny (Miss Massachusetts Teen USA 2008, season 22), Caelynn Miller-Keyes (Miss Virginia Teen USA 2013, season 23), Maurissa Gunn (Miss Montana Teen USA 2013, season 24), Mariela Pepin (Miss Maryland Teen USA 2014, season 25), and Susie Evans (Miss Virginia Teen USA 2011, season 26) have all participated on The Bachelor.
- Nicole Briscoe (née Manske), Miss Illinois Teen USA 1998, became a journalist and is currently an ESPN presenter. She is currently the studio host for motorsport programming (though Briscoe is not permitted to work in IndyCar Series races on ESPN, because her husband Ryan Briscoe is a IndyCar driver).
- Maria Menounos (Miss Massachusetts Teen USA 1996) became a reporter for Entertainment Tonight from 2002 to 2004, before moving to Access Hollywood. She also hosted the Eurovision Song Contest in 2006.
- Cerina Vincent (Miss Nevada Teen USA 1996) went on to become a successful model and actress, with many film and television credits to her name, with her most notable role being Maya, the Yellow Ranger in the television series Power Rangers Lost Galaxy in 1999.
- Shelley Hennig (Miss Teen USA 2004) went on to have a career in television, appearing in the soap opera Days of Our Lives from 2007 to 2011, before moving to mainstream series The Secret Circle from 2011 to 2012 and Teen Wolf from 2013 to 2017, which is her most successful television series.
- Kelly Hu (Miss Teen USA 1985) went on to have a career in movies, starring in The Scorpion King and X2: X-Men United.
- Allie LaForce (Miss Teen USA 2005) has had a career in television as a sports reporter for CBS Sports.

== Broadcasting of the pageant ==
=== 1983–2007: Viewership and later decline ===
The pageant's viewership peak was hit in 1988, when the pageant averaged over 22 million viewers on CBS. Even as recently as 1999, the show managed to bring in over 10 million viewers. The 2006 airing was the second lowest rated in the pageant's 23-year history, with only 5.6 million viewers watching the live broadcast (the lowest: 2004, with 5.34 million). The 2007 telecast (25th Anniversary, scheduled for August 24, 2007) was the last time Miss Teen USA aired live on television.

=== 2008–2023: internet pageant ===
The 2008 pageant was held, untelevised, on August 16, 2008. One factor that prevented NBC from broadcasting was its prime time commitment to the 2008 Summer Olympics in Beijing. Since then, it has been broadcast over the Internet on the Miss Teen USA website. It can be viewed worldwide, without any region restrictions via geolocation. Currently, it is hosted by YouTube (Ustream from 2008 to 2013). In addition, the webcast can be accessed on the pageant's Facebook page and on mobile devices using the official Miss Universe mobile app released during Miss USA 2016.

From 2012-2019, the pageant began to simulcast in selected regions on Microsoft's Xbox Live service, allowing owners of the Xbox 360 (until 2017) and/or Xbox One consoles to watch the pageant on a television screen. From 2017-2020, the pageant was also broadcast on Sony's PlayStation Network service.

=== 2024: Return to television ===
In March 2024, it was announced that for the first time since 2007, the pageant would be televised on The CW, alongside Miss USA.

== Crossovers with Miss USA ==
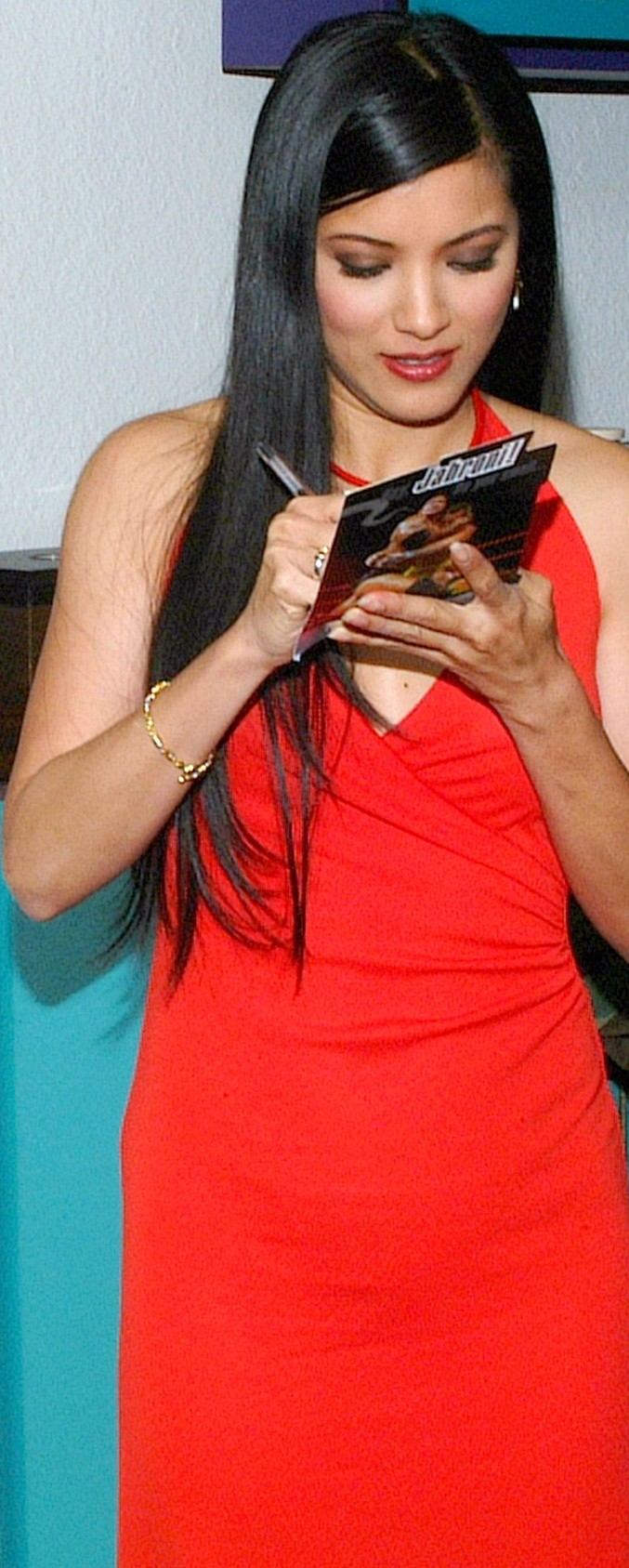
Miss Teen USA 1985 Kelly Hu, seen here on April 17, 2002, became a model and actress.

=== Miss Teen USA at Miss USA ===
In the early years of Miss Teen USA, three winners represented the title "Miss Teen USA" at Miss USA. The three queens were: Ruth Zakarian (1983), Cherise Haugen (1984), and Allison Brown (1986). This also made history because the Miss USA 1984 pageant had 53 delegates, the most ever in a Miss USA pageant. In 1987, Miss Teen USA 1986, Allison Brown participated in the 1987 Miss USA pageant. All three failed to make the cut at their respective Miss USA pageants.

Only in the three years mentioned above did Miss Teen USA winners automatically gain representation at Miss USA. Starting in 1988, if the Miss Teen USA winners want to compete at Miss USA, they first must win a Miss USA state crown. A total of seven Miss Teen USA winners have participated at Miss USA, with four winning their state Miss USA crowns first. The first of these was Kelly Hu, Miss Teen USA 1985, who won the Miss Hawaii USA 1993 title and represented Hawaii at Miss USA 1993. She finished as a finalist. The next was Jamie Solinger, Miss Teen USA 1992. She took the Miss Iowa USA 1998 title but failed to make the cut at the Miss USA pageant. Only two Miss Teen USA winners have made the top 3 of Miss USA. Brandi Sherwood, Miss Teen USA 1989 won the Miss Idaho USA 1997 title. Succeeding Kelly, she took 1st runner up and later inherited the Miss USA crown, when Brook Mahealani Lee of Hawaii won Miss Universe 1997. She is the only Miss Teen USA winner to hold the title Miss USA. Shauna Gambill was close in winning the Miss USA 1998 title, but placed 1st runner up to Shawnae Jebbia, Miss Massachusetts USA 1998. However, to date it has never happened that the same woman had won the 2 separate pageants officially.

There have been two years when two Miss Teen USA winners participated at Miss USA. The first was 1984, when Miss Teen USA 1983 and Miss Teen USA 1984 participated, the second was 1998, when Jamie Solinger competed as Miss Iowa USA but went unplaced, and Shauna Gambill competed as Miss California USA and placed first runner-up.

The first Miss Teen USA not to win a Miss USA state pageant on her first attempt was Christie Lee Woods, Miss Teen USA 1996, of Texas, who placed third runner-up in the Miss Texas USA 2002 pageant. She would also become the first Miss Teen USA to compete for, but never win a Miss USA state title (she also placed as a semi-finalist in 2003 and 2004). The second Miss Teen USA who did not win a Miss USA state title on her first attempt was Ashley Coleman, Miss Teen USA 1999, of Delaware, who competed in the Miss California USA 2006 pageant and finished third runner-up. She is the first Miss Teen USA winner to compete in a different state from that where she won her Miss Teen USA crown. Tami Farrell, Miss Teen USA 2003, competed at Miss California USA 2009 as Miss Malibu USA, but failed to win the crown, placing first runner-up to Carrie Prejean. Farrell competed at Miss Teen USA as Miss Oregon Teen USA, and was one of the few Miss Teen USA winners to try for the state crown outside of the state she represented for Miss Teen USA. In a span of only two years later, Miss Teen USA 2006, Katie Blair also competed at Miss California USA 2011. Representing the state of Montana at Miss Teen USA 2006, Blair is only the third Miss Teen USA to compete in a state other than the state she competed in Teen. Similarly to Coleman and Farrell, Blair placed 1st runner up in the pageant, to Alyssa Campanella, who also competed in Miss Teen USA representing New Jersey. Campanella went on to win Miss USA 2011. Danielle Doty, Miss Teen USA 2011, competed at Miss Texas USA 2018, who placed in the semifinals.

== See also ==
- Miss Teenage America
- Miss America's Teen
- Miss USA
