= Miss Teen USA 1986 =

4th edition of the Miss Teen USA competition

- Date: January 21, 1986
- Presenters: Michael Young; Morgan Brittany
- Entertainment: The Commodores; Frankie Avalon; Fabian; Bobby Rydell
- Venue: Ocean Center, Daytona Beach, Florida
- Broadcaster: CBS; WCPX-TV
- Entrants: 51
- Placements: 10
- Winner: Allison Brown; Oklahoma
- Congeniality: Dana Moody; Arkansas
- Photogenic: Kristy Vanney; Arizona

Miss Teen USA 1986, the 4th Miss Teen USA pageant, was televised live from Ocean Center, Daytona Beach, Florida on January 21, 1986. At the conclusion of the final competition, Allison Brown of Oklahoma was crowned by outgoing queen Kelly Hu of Hawaii.

== Background ==
Daytona Beach was announced as the host city for the 1986 pageant in November 1985. This marked the first time the pageant was held in Daytona Beach, although it had previously been staged in Florida twice: in Lakeland in 1983, the pageant's inaugural year, and in Miami in 1985. The Volusia County Council committed up to $100,000 in county money in its bid to host the pageant, in return for a promised 18 minutes of promotional footage during the broadcast. The decision was criticised by feminists who criticised the county's decision to spend money on the pageant.

== Event ==
Contestants spent three weeks in the Daytona Beach area preparing to compete for the title. The pageant was hosted by Michael Young, the host from 1983 to 1984 who returned from hosting after a break in 1985. Colour commentary was provided by Morgan Brittany, and there was entertainment from The Commodores, the Solid Gold Dancers and "The Golden Boys of the Bandstand", Bobby Rydell, Frankie Avalon and Fabian.

== Results ==
=== Placements ===
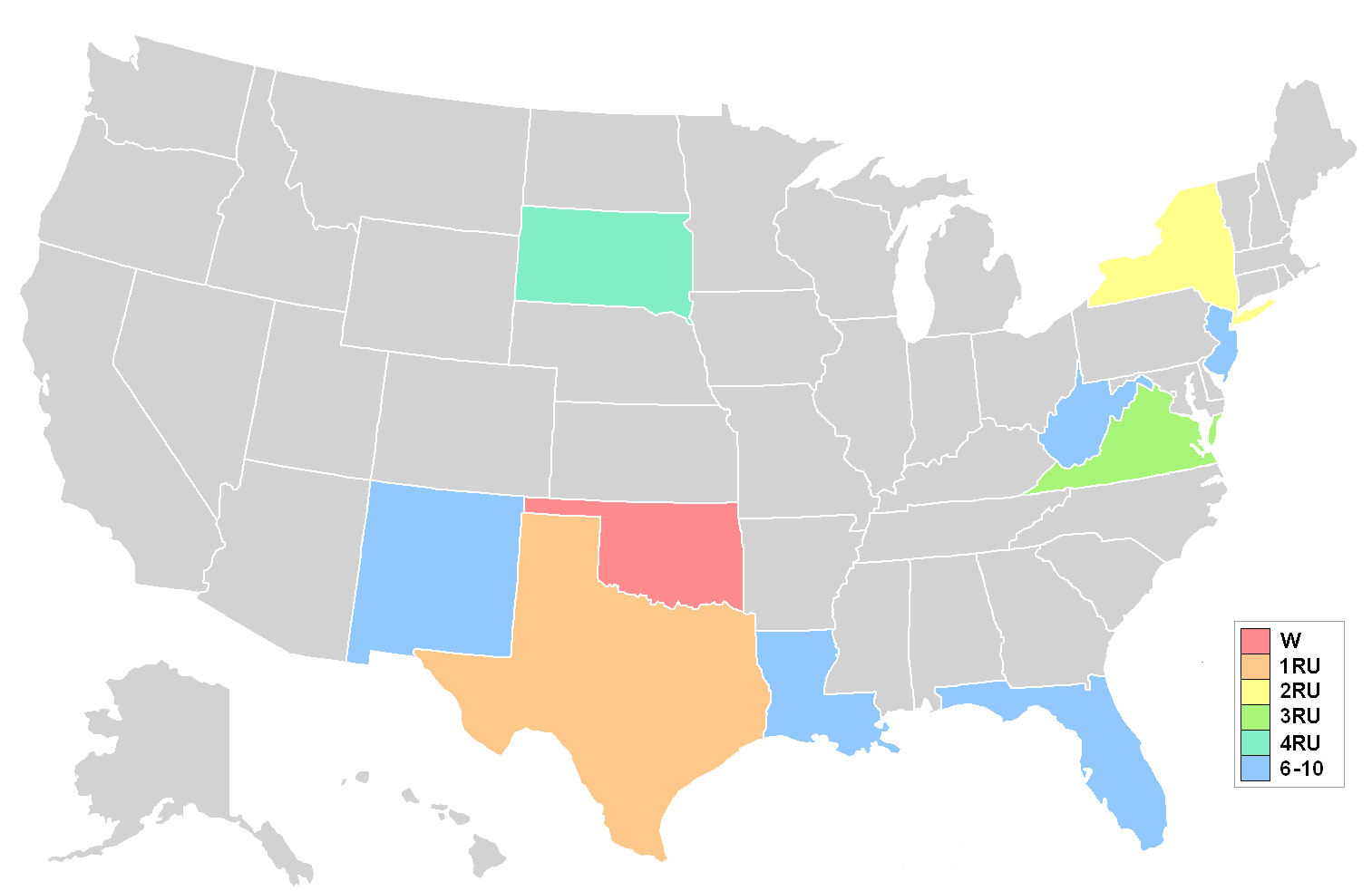
Map showing placements by state

The 1986 pageant results were:

Final results	Contestant
Miss Teen USA 1986	Oklahoma – Allison Brown
1st Runner-Up	Texas – Rebecca "Becky" Pestana
2nd Runner-Up	New York – Claudia Liem
3rd Runner-Up	Virginia – Angela Thigpen
4th Runner-Up	South Dakota – Valerie Marsden
Top 10	Florida – Stefanie Smith; Louisiana – Shasta St. Angelo; New Jersey – Rosalie Cecilia Cuozzo; New Mexico – Kerali Hansen; West Virginia – Jody Caldwell

=== Special awards ===
Award	Contestant
Miss Congeniality	Arkansas – Dana Moody
Miss Photogenic	Arizona – Kristi Vanney
Best state costume	Pennsylvania – Melissa Forlini

== Judges ==
The celebrity panel of judges comprised the following:

- Beverly Sassoon – actress and author, wife of Vidal Sassoon
- Tim Foli – coach of the Texas Rangers
- Susan Richardson – actress, Eight is Enough
- Henry Polic II – actor, Webster
- Beverly Johnson – international model
- Allen Fawcett – presenter of Puttin' on the Hits
- Randi Reisfeld – editor of 16 Magazine
- Marj Dusay – actress, Capitol
- Bobbie To – fashion designer
- Cherise Haugen – Miss Teen USA 1984
- Hinton Battle – Broadway dancer

== Delegates ==
The Miss Teen USA 1986 delegates were:

State/District	Contestant	Age (Note: Ages at the time of the pageant)	Hometown	Placement/Award	Notes	Ref.
Alabama	Dell McGhee	18	Alexander City			
Alaska	Bobbie Mitchell	17	Fairbanks			
Arizona	Kristi Vanney	16	Tempe	Miss Photogenic		
Arkansas	Dana Moody	17	Desha	Miss Congeniality		
California	Michelle Low	17	Ontario			
Colorado	Raeann Durkee					
Connecticut	Karen Zawacki	17	Danbury			
Delaware	Laura Hawthorne	17	Wilmington			
District of Columbia	Melissa Gilbert	17	Washington, D.C.			
Florida	Stefanie Smith	16	Jacksonville	Semi-finalist		
Georgia	Wendy Neuendorf	16	Dunwoody		Later Miss Alabama 1991	
Hawaii	Michelle Hardin					
Idaho	Kathryn Comba	16	Boise			
Illinois	Dyann Lowery	18	Sandwich			
Indiana	Danielle Wayne	17	Portage			
Iowa	Kristin Hudson		Des Moines			
Kansas	Kimberlee Girrens	16	Wichita		Later Miss Kansas USA 1992 and top six at Miss USA 1992	
Kentucky	Amy Miller					
Louisiana	Shasta St Angelo	16		Semi-finalist		
Maine	Linda Marie Kiene				Later Miss Maine USA 1992	
Maryland	Julie Stanford				Later Miss Maryland USA 1990	
Massachusetts	Michelle King		Manchester			
Michigan	Terri Turner		Clawson			
Minnesota	Jennifer Gessell		Bloomington			
Mississippi	Michele Fouché		Jackson			
Missouri	Jennifer Tangora					
Montana	Camille "Kami" Kostelecky	17	Bozeman			
Nebraska	Elizabeth Feige	17	LaVista			
Nevada	Wendi Stewart					
New Hampshire	Diane Dothan					
New Jersey	Rosalie Cuozzo	17	Colts Neck	Semi-finalist		
New Mexico	Kerali Hansen	17	Las Cruces	Semi-finalist		
New York	Claudia Liem	15	Glendale	2nd runner-up		
North Carolina	Denise Jenkins	16	Wilmington			
North Dakota	Shannon Kaiser	16	Williston			
Ohio	Michele Beane	15	Englewood			
Oklahoma	Allison Brown	17	Edmond	Miss Teen USA		
Oregon	Danna Christiansen	17	Oregon City			
Pennsylvania	Melissa Forlini	15	Reading	Best state costume		
Rhode Island	Corrine "Lori" Damiani	17	Cranston			
South Carolina	Angela Shuler	17	Fort Mill		Later Miss South Carolina USA 1989	
South Dakota	Valerie Marsden	17	Rapid City	4th runner-up		
Tennessee	Wendy Laws	16	Elizabethton			
Texas	Rebecca "Becky" Pestana		San Antonio	1st runner-up		
Utah	Michelle Montgomery	17				
Vermont	Holly Matava	16	Brattleboro			
Virginia	Angela Thigpen	15	Portsmouth	3rd runner-up		
Washington	Lisa Elliott	17	Snohomish			
West Virginia	Jody Caldwell	15		Semi-finalist		
Wisconsin	Lanae St. John	16	La Crosse			
Wyoming	Julie Henry	16	Gillette			
