= Semrow =

Semrow is a surname. Notable people with the surname include:

- Harry H. Semrow (1915–1987), American politician and baseball team owner
- Vanessa Semrow (born 1984), American beauty queen
