= Miss Teen USA 2014 =

32nd edition of the Miss Teen USA competition

- Promotional banner for Miss Teen USA 2014 featuring Cassidy Wolf
- Date: August 2, 2014
- Presenters: Karl Jeno Schmid; Erin Brady
- Venue: Grand Ballroom, Atlantis Paradise Island, Nassau, The Bahamas
- Broadcaster: Xbox Live; YouTube
- Entrants: 51
- Placements: 15
- Winner: K. Lee Graham; South Carolina
- Congeniality: Sydney Robertson; Pennsylvania
- Photogenic: Baskin Champion; Alabama

Miss Teen USA 2014, the 32nd Miss Teen USA pageant. It was held at the Atlantis Paradise Island Resort in Nassau, Bahamas on August 2, 2014, and was hosted by Australian journalist Karl Jeno Schmid and Miss USA 2013 Erin Brady. Cassidy Wolf of California crowned her successor K. Lee Graham of South Carolina at the end of the event.

== Historical significance ==
- South Carolina wins competition for the second time.
- Mississippi earns the 1st runner-up position for the first time.
- Pennsylvania earns the 2nd runner-up position for the second time. The last time it was placed in 1993.
- California earns the 3rd runner-up position for the first time.
- New Jersey earns the 4th runner-up position for the second time. The last time it was placed in 2003.
- States that placed in semifinals the previous year were California, New Jersey, South Carolina, Tennessee, West Virginia and Wisconsin.
- South Carolina and West Virginia placed for the fourth consecutive year.
- California, New Jersey, Tennessee and Wisconsin made their second consecutive placement.
- Michigan and Oklahoma last placed in 2012.
- Indiana, Pennsylvania and Texas last placed in 2011.
- Mississippi last placed in 2010.
- Arizona and Massachusetts last placed in 2008.
- Delaware last placed in 1999.
- Georgia and Kansas break an ongoing streak of placements since 2011.
- Alabama, Hawaii and New York break an ongoing streak of placements since 2012.

== Pageant ==
=== Selection of contestants ===
One delegate from each state and the District of Columbia was chosen in state pageants held from September 2013 to January 2014.

The date was announced on April 2, 2014, by each delegate, which was officially confirmed shortly thereafter.

=== Preliminary round ===
Prior to the final telecast, the delegates competed in the preliminary competition, which involves private interviews with the judges and a presentation show where they compete in swimsuit and evening gown. The preliminary competition took place on August 1, 2014.

=== Finals ===
During the final competition, the top fifteen competed in swimsuit and evening gown, and the top five competed in the final question signed up by a panel of judges.

== Judges ==
- Amber Katz
- Christielle Lim
- Fred Nelson
- Joe Parisi
- Mallory Tucker

== Contestants ==
State	Name	Hometown	Age^{1}	Placement	Awards	Notes
Alabama	Baskin Champion	Vestavia Hills	19		Miss Photogenic	
Alaska	Whitney Williams	Anchorage	17			Later 1st runner-up at Miss Alaska USA 2019
Arizona	Savannah Wix	Paradise Valley	18	Top 15		Later Miss Arizona USA 2019 and Miss Malibu USA 2019
Arkansas	Lauren Weaver	Greenwood	18			Later Miss Arkansas USA 2018
California	Bianca Vierra	Hayward	18	3rd Runner-up		Previously Miss Teenage California 2011; Previously Miss High School America 2012; Later 1st runner-up at Miss California USA 2018
Colorado	Cindy Yan	Denver	16			
Connecticut	Sydney West	Vernon	16			Sister of Miss Connecticut Teen USA 2012 & Miss Teen USA 2012 Logan West
Delaware	Mia Jones	Bear	18	Top 15		Later Miss Delaware USA 2017
District of Columbia	Dominick Fink	Chesapeake, VA	19			Previously Miss Virginia's Outstanding Teen 2011
Florida	Natalie Fiallo	Miami	15			
Georgia	Noelle Hughley	Lithonia	17			
Hawaii	Mariah Gosling	Honolulu	18			
Idaho	Hannah Menzner	Boise	18			Later 1st runner-up at Miss Idaho USA 2019; Later Miss District of Columbia Sweetheart 2020; Later 2nd runner-up at Miss District of Columbia USA 2021; Later 1st runner-up at Miss Idaho USA 2022
Illinois	Miranda Fenzau	Orland Park	18			Later 4th runner-up at Miss Illinois USA 2022
Indiana	Zoe Parker	Fort Wayne	16	Top 15		
Iowa	Amanda Armstrong	Sioux City	16			
Kansas	Claire-Bailey Lee	Andover	17			Daughter of Miss Kansas USA 1986, Audra Ockerman
Kentucky	Megan Ducharm	Shelbyville	18			
Louisiana	Mary Risener	Houma	18			
Maine	Danielle Hurtubise	Portland	16			
Maryland	Mariela Pepin	Severn	18			Born in Puerto Rico; Later top 10 at Miss World America 2017; Later Miss Maryland USA 2019 and top 10 at Miss USA 2019; Later contestant on season 25 of The Bachelor
Massachusetts	Bailey Medeiros	Monson	16	Top 15		New England Patriots Cheerleader; Later 1st runner-up at Miss Massachusetts USA 2022
Michigan	Iris Robare	Gladstone	16	Top 15		
Minnesota	Catherine Stanley	Bloomington	18			Later Miss Minnesota USA 2019 and top 15 at Miss USA 2019
Mississippi	Vaeda Mann	Hattiesburg	17	1st Runner-up		
Missouri	Samantha Bowers	Harrisonville	18			Later 2nd runner-up at Miss Missouri USA 2017
Montana	Madyson Rigg	Kalispell	17			
Nebraska	Savannah Rave	Omaha	18			
Nevada	Alexa Taylor	Summerlin	17			
New Hampshire	Mikaela Seamans	Keene	17			
New Jersey	Valentina Sánchez	Spring Lake Heights	19	4th Runner-up		Previously Teen Model Venezuela 2011; Later 2nd runner-up at Miss New Jersey USA 2020; Later competed at Miss Venezuela 2020, finished in Top 5; Later Miss Supranational Venezuela 2021; Later 3rd runner-up at Miss Supranational 2021
New Mexico	Aundria (Auna) Littlejohn	Las Cruces	17			
New York	Corrin Stellakis	Bridgeport	16			Later Miss Missouri World and top 12 at Miss World America 2015; Later Miss Earth United States 2016 and top 8 at Miss Earth 2016; Later winner of Miss Multiverse Season 3; Later top 21 at Miss New York USA 2019; Later Miss U.S. International 2021
North Carolina	Pammy Peters	Raleigh	17			
North Dakota	Josie Hettich	Wilton	17			
Ohio	Emma Rofkar	Curtice	17			
Oklahoma	Brooklynne Bond	Tulsa	16	Top 15		
Oregon	Alexandra Perry	Portland	16			
Pennsylvania	Sydney Robertson	Williamsport	17	2nd Runner-up	Miss Congeniality	Later Miss Pennsylvania USA 2021
Rhode Island	Gabriella Maggiacomo	Hope	17			
South Carolina	K. Lee Graham	Chapin	17	Miss Teen USA 2014		Daughter of Miss South Carolina Teen USA 1985, Jennifer Newin
South Dakota	Madison McKeown	Brandon	18			Later Miss South Dakota USA 2016 and top 10 at Miss USA 2016
Tennessee	Morgan Moseley	Johnson City	15	Top 15		
Texas	Kellie Stewart	Fort Worth	16	Top 15		
Utah	Savannah Lancaster	Salt Lake City	18			
Vermont	Madison Cota	Bellows Falls	17			Later Miss Vermont USA 2017; Semifinalist at Miss Massachusetts 2018
Virginia	Olivia Fletcher	Louisa	16			Later 4th runner-up at Miss Virginia USA 2018
Washington	Starla Sampaco	Bellevue	18			Later 1st runner-up at Miss Washington USA 2022
West Virginia	Lexsey Marrara	Morgantown	17	Top 15		Later top 15 at Miss West Virginia USA 2018
Wisconsin	Patience Vallier	Lake Mills	17	Top 15		
Wyoming	Karlie Sanders	Casper	18			
