= Miss California Teen USA =

Beauty pageant competition

- Formation: 1983
- Type: Beauty pageant
- Headquarters: Santa Monica
- Location: California
- Members: Miss Teen USA
- Official language: English
- Website: www.misscaliforniausa.com

The Miss California Teen USA competition is the pageant that selects the representative for the state of California in the Miss Teen USA pageant. It was formed in 1983. This pageant is part of the Miss USA Organization.

California is in the top five most successful states at Miss Teen USA in terms of number and value of placements. Miss California Teen USA titleholders have been invited to red-carpet movie premieres, such as that for Santa Clause 3 attended by Kylee Lin, and She's the Man, attended by Jessica Powell.

Ava Grace Nichols of La Jolla was crowned Miss California Teen USA 2026 on July 12, 2026, at the Grand Hyatt Indian Wells Resort in Indian Wells. She will represent California at Miss Teen USA 2026.

== History ==
In the 1980s, the pageant was directed by Richard Guy and Rex Holt, who also oversaw the Miss California USA, Miss Texas USA and Miss Texas Teen USA pageants. They lost the contract in 1990, when it came up for renewal.

== Gallery of titleholders ==
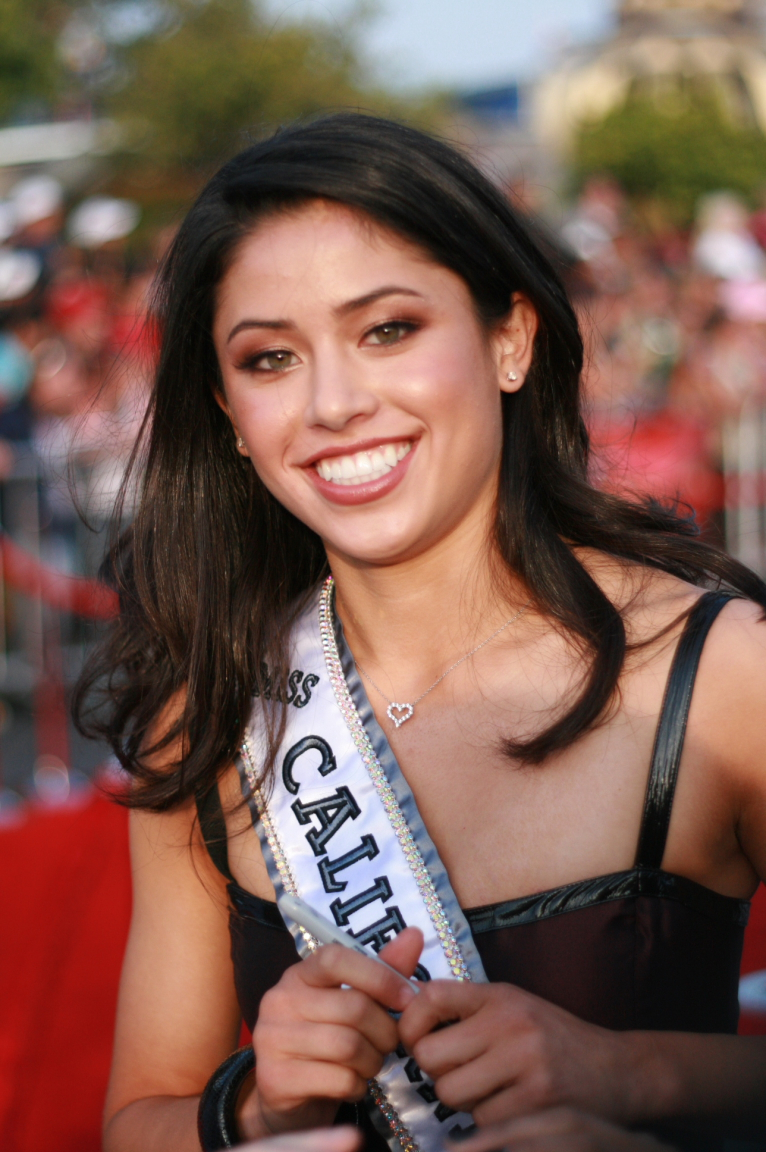
Kylee Lin, Miss California Teen USA 2007, at the Pirates of the Caribbean: At World's End film premiere

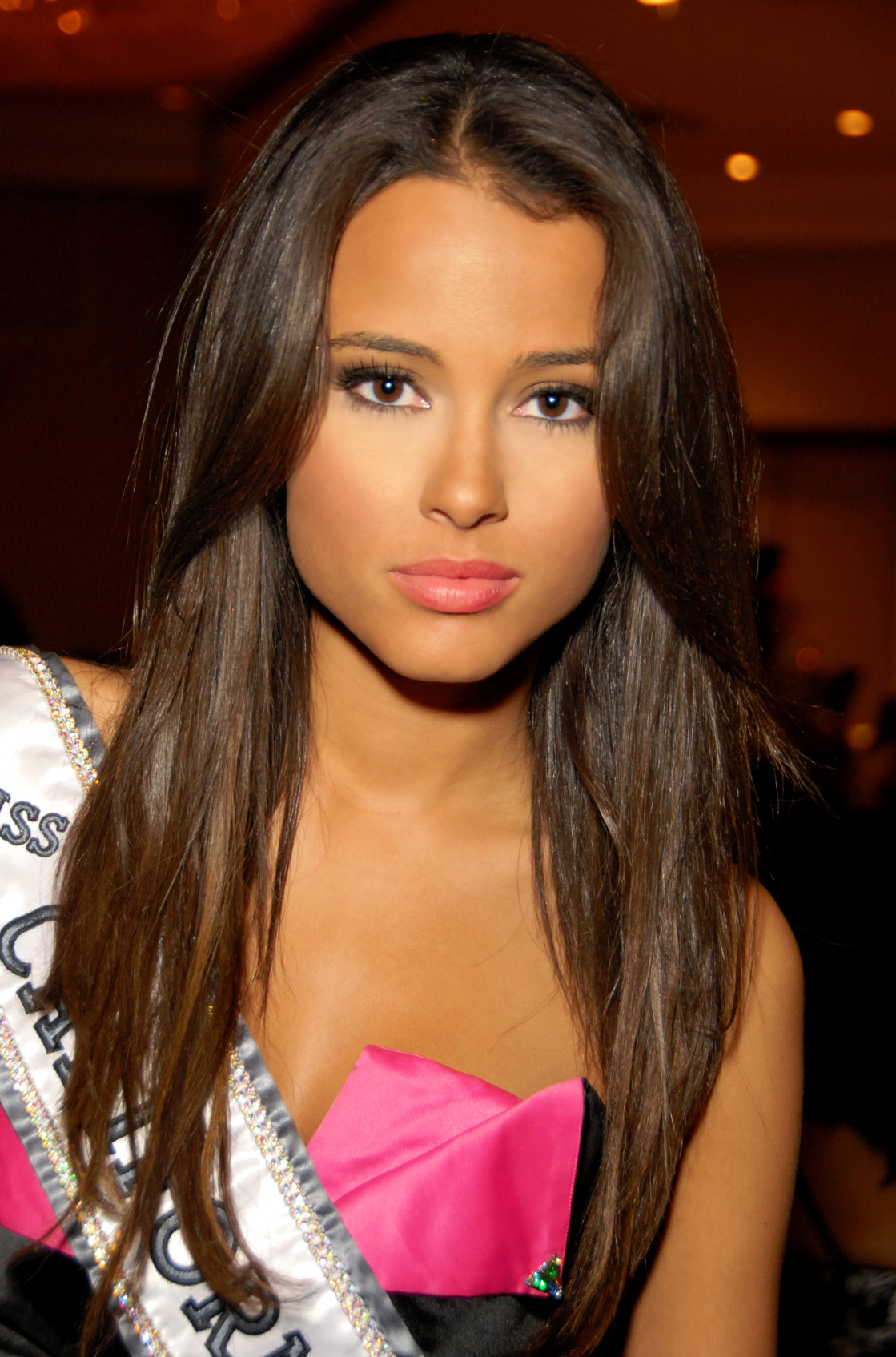
Miss California Teen USA 2009, Chelsea Gilligan, attending the "Beauty of California Dinner" at The Riviera Resort & Spa, Palm Springs, CA on Nov. 21, 2009

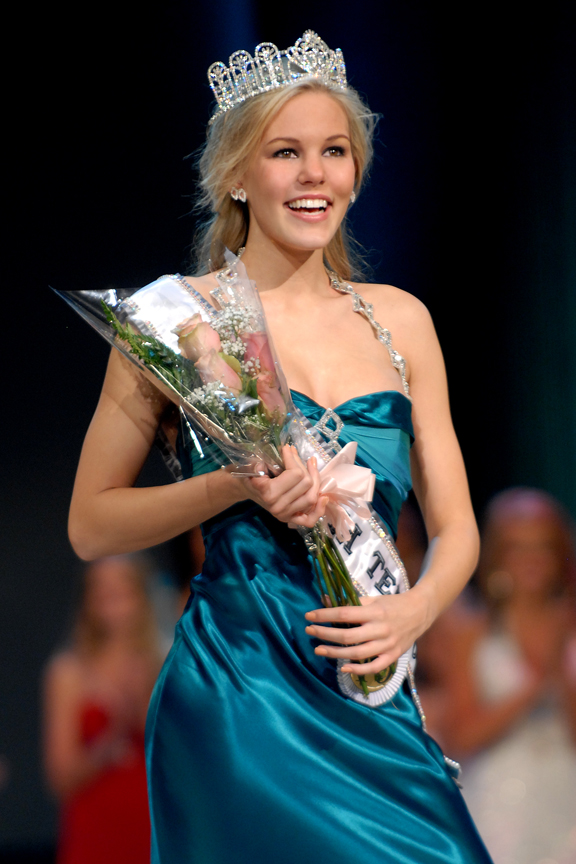
Miss California Teen USA 2010, Emma Baker, on-stage at the Agua Caliente Casino in Rancho Mirage, CA on Nov. 22, 2009

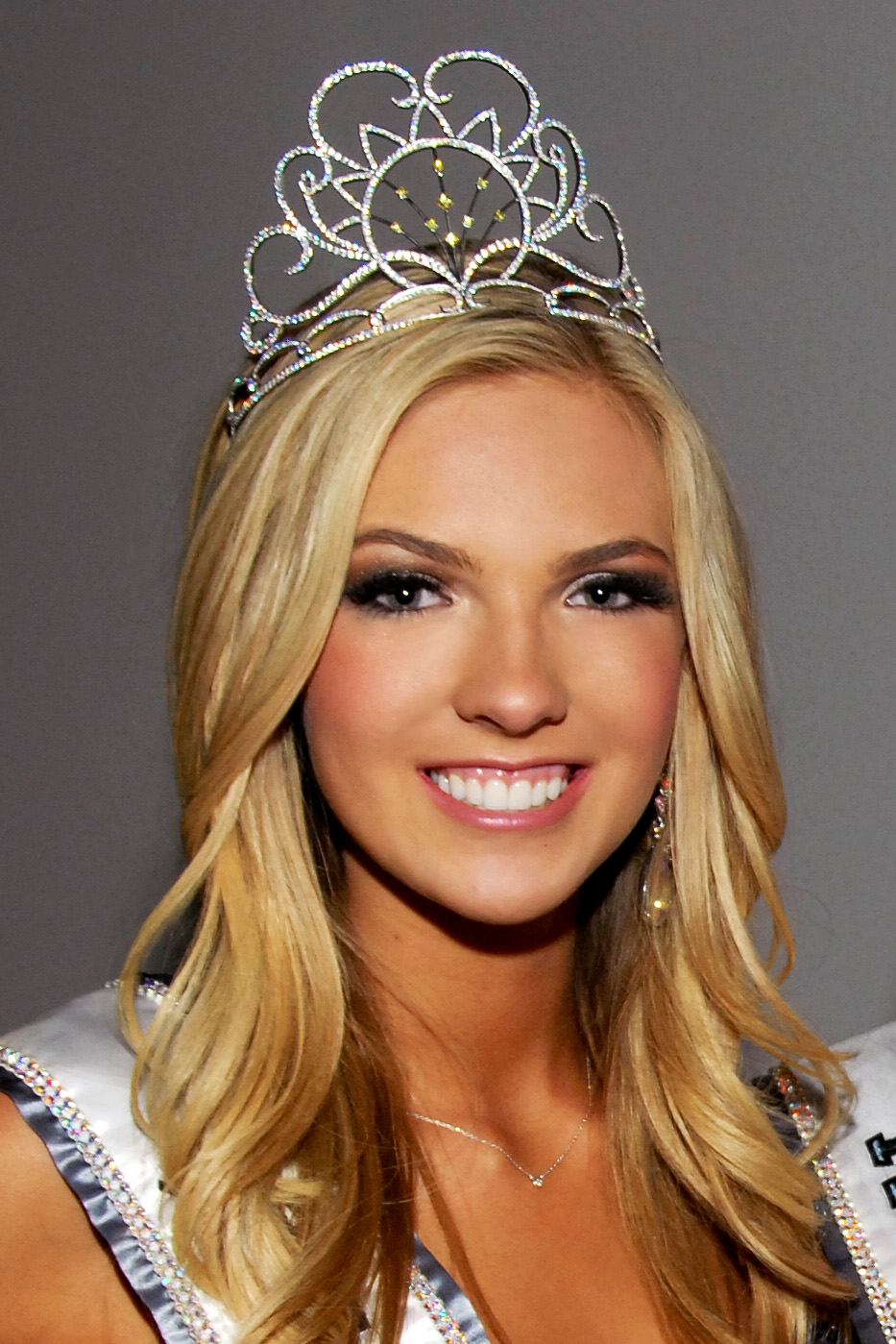
Miss California Teen USA 2011, Alexis Swanstrom, Rancho Mirage, CA on Nov. 21, 2010

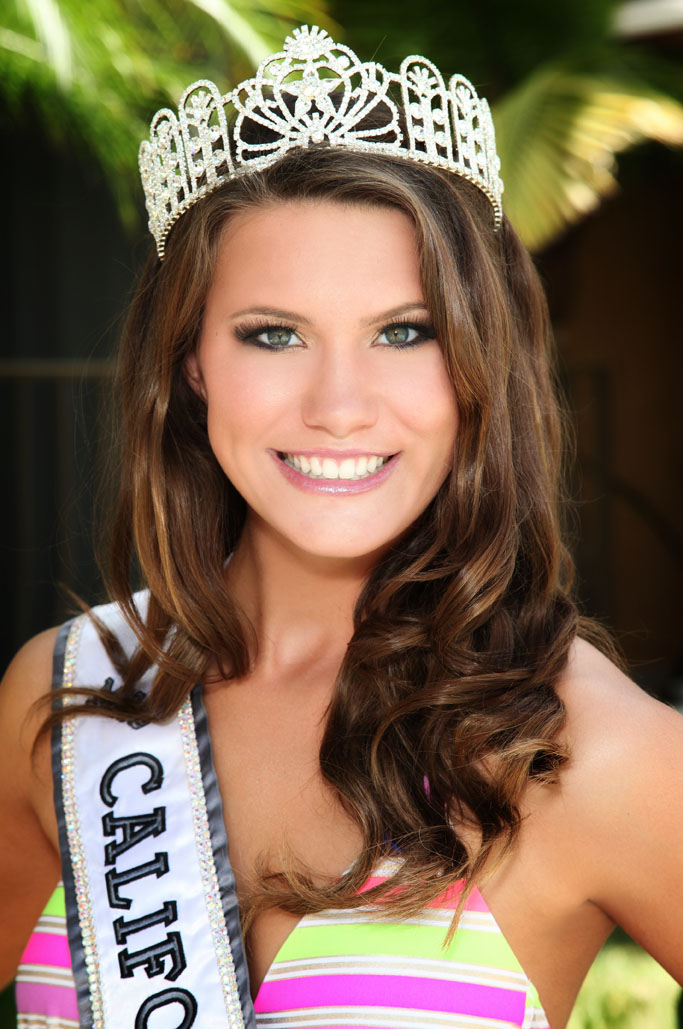
Miss California Teen USA 2012 Alexa Jones, Irvine, California on June 16, 2012

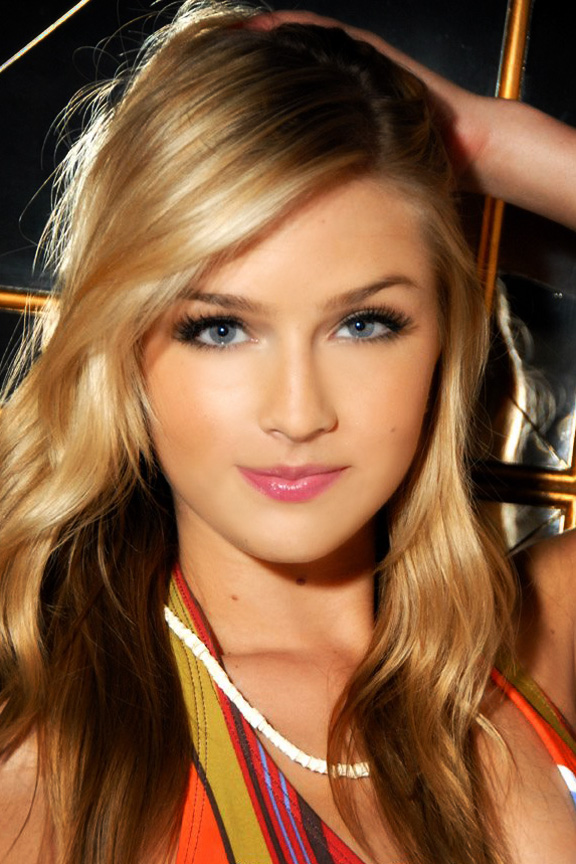
Miss California Teen USA 2013 and Miss Teen USA 2013, Cassidy Wolf, Irvine, California on January 4, 2014

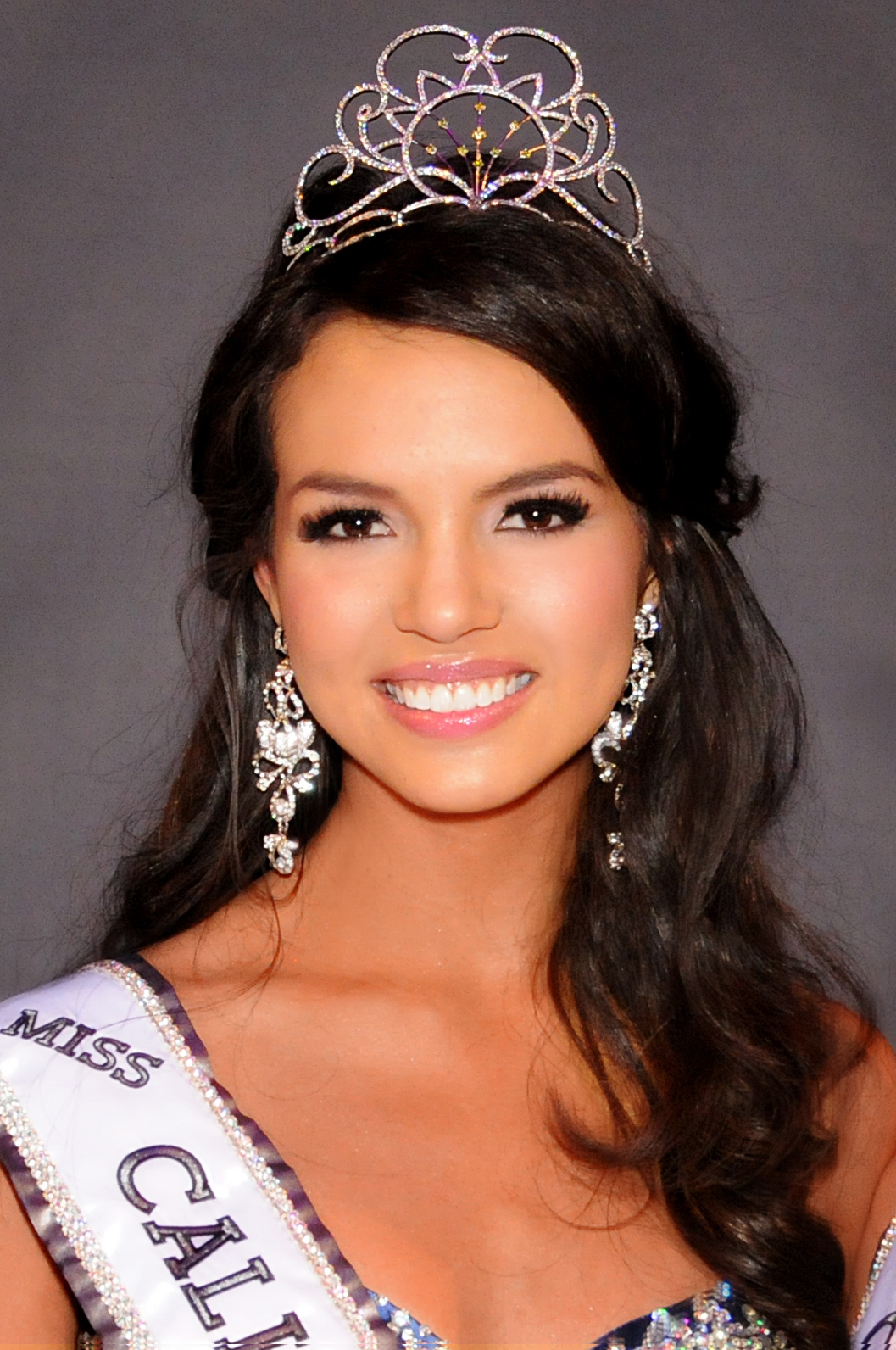
Miss California Teen USA 2014 Bianca Vierra, Long Beach, California on January 4, 2014

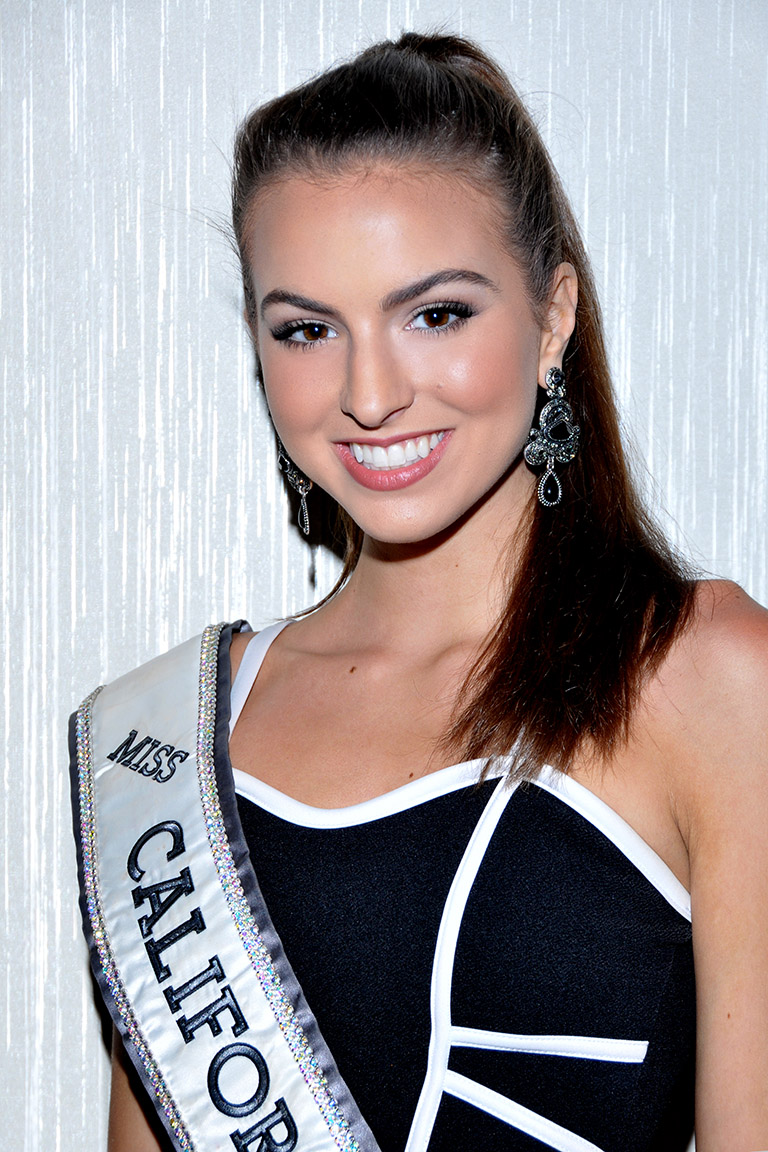
Miss California Teen USA 2015 Melanie Mitchell, Corona, California on July 19, 2015

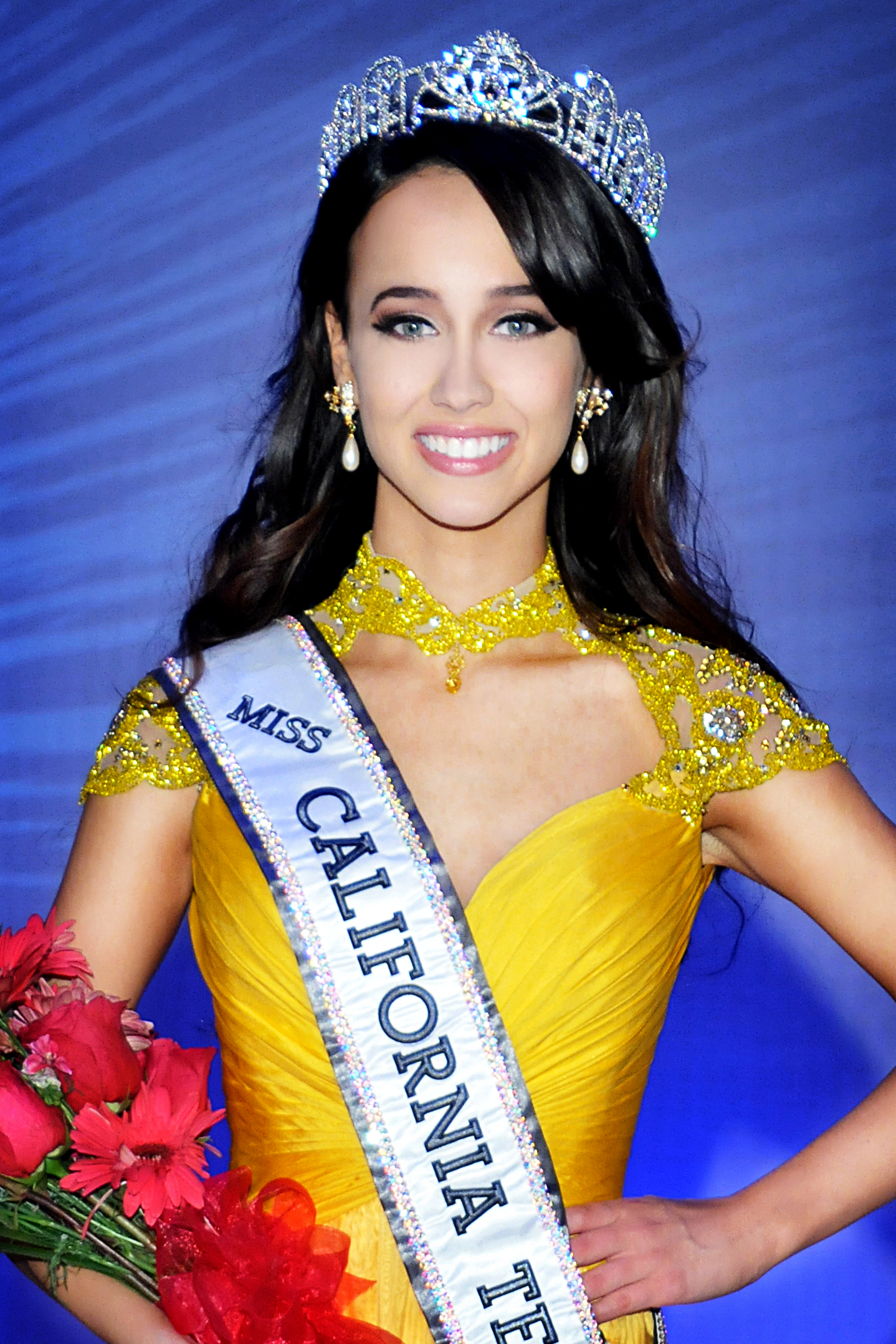
Miss California Teen USA 2016 Athenna Crosby, Long Beach, California on December 6, 2015

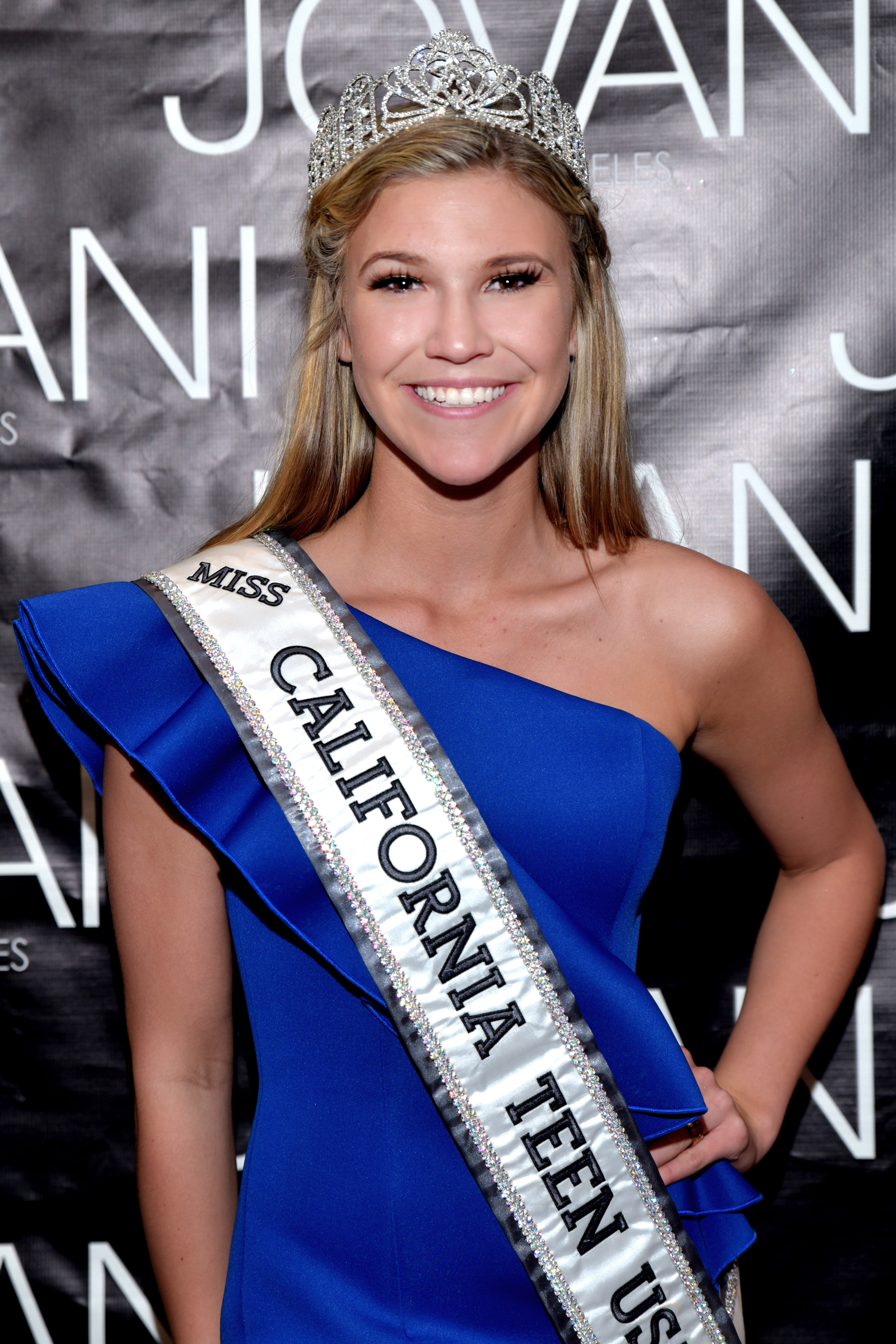
Miss California Teen USA 2019 Alina Carranza, Los Angeles, California on March 14, 2019

== Results summary ==
=== Placements ===
- Miss Teen USAs: Shauna Gambill (1994), Cassidy Wolf (2013)
- 1st runners-up: Jennifer Morgan (2002), Melanie Mitchell (2015)
- 2nd runners-up: Michelle Cardamon (1996), Chelsea Gilligan (2009), Emma Baker (2010), Alexis Swanstrom (2011), Cassidy Hill (2022)
- 3rd runner-up: Bianca Vierra (2014)
- 4th runners-up: Stephanie Brink (2005), Jaanu Patel (2017)
- Top 6: Natasha Allas (1992)
- Top 10: Shawn Gardner (1983), Angi Aylor (1987), Casey McClain (2001), Ava Grace Nichols (2026)
- Top 12: Trisha Robey (1990), Kellie Foster-Moore (1995)
- Top 15/16/20: Taylor Atkins (2008), Athenna Crosby (2016), Janeice Love (2018), Zoe Hunt (2020), Cameron Doan (2021), Taliya Ariana Peiris (2023), Raynah Hudson (2025)

California holds a record of 26 placements at Miss Teen USA.

=== Awards ===
Best State Costume: Raynah Hudson (2025)

== Winners ==
Color key

- Declared as Winner
- Ended as runner-up
- Ended as one of the finalists or semifinalists

Year	Name	Hometown	Age^{1}	Local Title	Placement at Miss Teen USA	Special awards at Miss Teen USA	Notes
2026	Ava Grace Nichols	La Jolla	17	Miss La Jolla Teen	Top 10		
2025	Raynah Hudson	Malibu	17	Miss Malibu Teen	Top 20	Best State Costume	
2024	Paige Gonor	San Diego	18	Miss San Diego County Teen			
2023	Taliya Ariana Peiris	San Ramon	18	Miss Bay Area Teen	Top 20		
2022	Cassidy Hill	Newport Beach	18	Miss Newport Beach Teen	Second runner-up		
2021	Cameron Doan	Anaheim	19	Miss Anaheim Hills Teen	Top 16		Previously Miss California's Outstanding Teen 2018; Top 9 at Miss America's Outstanding Teen 2019
2020	Zoe Hunt	Coronado	17	Miss Coronado Teen	Top 16		
2019	Alina Rae Carranza	Los Angeles	17	Miss Woodland Hills Teen			
2018	Janeice Love	Barstow	17	Miss Coastal Cities Teen	Top 15		
2017	Jaanu Patel	Huntington Beach	16	Miss Huntington Beach Teen	Fourth runner-up		
2016	Athenna Crosby	San Jose	17	Miss Santa Monica Teen	Top 15		Top 15 at Miss Utah USA 2019
2015	Melanie Mitchell	Anaheim	16	Miss Anaheim Hills Teen	First runner-up		
2014	Bianca Vierra	Hayward	19	Miss Brea Canyon Teen	Third runner-up		1st runner-up at Miss California USA 2018
2013	Chloe Hope Hatfield	Norco	18	Miss Malibu Teen	did not compete		1st runner-up at Miss California Teen USA 2013; succeeded Cassidy Wolf when Wolf won Miss Teen USA 2013; Later Miss Collegiate America 2016
2013	Cassidy Wolf	Temecula	19	Miss Greater San Diego Teen	Miss Teen USA 2013		
2012	Alexa Jones	Ramona	18	Miss Orange County Teen			First runner-up Miss Arizona USA 2014; Top 20 Miss Arizona USA 2015-2016; Miss California U.S. International 2016; Top 20 Miss California USA 2017
2011	Alexis Swanstrom	San Diego	17	Miss San Diego Teen	Second runner-up		Third runner-up at Miss California USA 2014; Top 10 at Miss California USA 2015
2010	Emma Baker	Poway	18	Miss Poway Teen	Second runner-up		Second runner-up at Miss Washington USA 2014
2009	Chelsea Gilligan	Beaumont	18	Miss Beaumont Teen	Second runner-up		
2008	Taylor Atkins	Piru	17	Miss Ventura County Teen	Top 15		
2007	Kylee Lin	San Rafael	16	Miss Marin Teen			
2006	Jessica Powell	Barstow	18	Miss Barstow Teen			
2005	Stephanie Brink	Bellflower	18		Fourth runner-up		
2004	Stacey Beltran	Oxnard	18				Miss California Teen International 2005
2003	Shannon Byrne	Vacaville	18				
2002	Jennifer Morgan	Alpine	17		First runner-up		
2001	Casey McClain	San Marcos	18		Top 10		
2000	Alexandra Thompson	Vacaville	15				
1999	Marianne Kennedy	Long Beach	17				
1998	Amanda O'Leary	Fullerton	19				
1997	Kimberly Gloudemans	Bakersfield	16				First runner-up to National Sweetheart 2001
1996	Michelle Cardamon	San Diego	18		Second runner-up		
1995	Kellie Foster-Moore	Fresno	17		Top 12		
1994	Shauna Gambill	Acton	17		Miss Teen USA 1994		Later Miss California USA 1998, First runner up at Miss USA 1998; Miss World USA 1998, represented the United States at Miss World 1998 (Top 10).
1993	Stefanie Sweeney	El Dorado Hills	18				Now Stevi McShane; owner of Crowned One Productions, a pageant production company, and director of the Miss California U.S. International Pageant and the Jr. Miss and Miss Teen and Miss California American Beauty Pageant. She was also Mrs. California International, 2008.
1992	Natasha Allas	Los Angeles	18		Top 6		Later Miss World USA 1999, Semi-finalist at Miss World 1999
1991	Jolene Fulkner	Yorba Linda	14				Youngest ever Miss California Teen USA
1990	Trisha Robey	Los Angeles	18		Top 12		
1989	Michealean Bonilla	Los Angeles	17				
1988	Alison Moreno	El Toro	15			Best State Costume	Disqualified from competing at the national pageant curfew violation, contrary to pageant rules.
1987	Angi Aylor	El Toro	14		Top 10 (6th)	Miss Photogenic (tie)	Second runner up in Miss World USA 1994
1986	Michelle Lowe	Ontario	17				
1985	Sharon Gunther	Clovis	16				
1984	Jodie Alvarez	San Pedro	19				
1983	Shawn Jeanie Gardner	Modesto	17		Top 10		Placed first runner-up in state pageant, assumed title when winner resigned title to get married.
1983	Teresa St. Nicholas	Monterey	17				Resigned

^{1} Age at the time of the Miss Teen USA pageant
