= K. Lee Graham =

American model

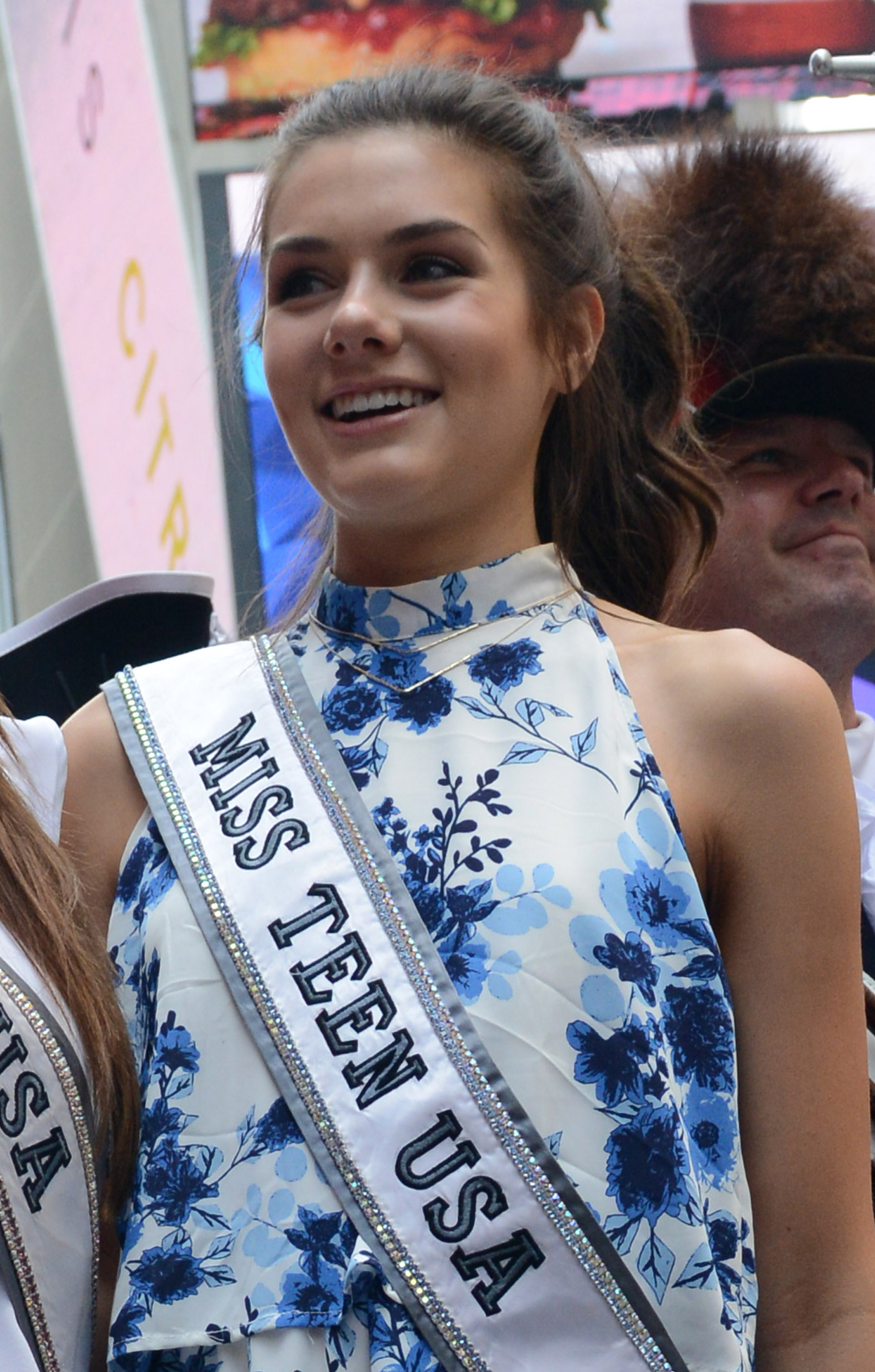
- Born: Katherine Lee Graham; April 30, 1997 (age 29); Florence, South Carolina, U.S.
- Education: University of South Carolina
- Beauty pageant titleholder
- Title: Miss South Carolina Teen USA 2014; Miss Teen USA 2014
- Hair color: Brown
- Eye color: Blue
- Major competitions: Miss Teen USA 2014 (Winner)

Katherine Lee Graham (born April 30, 1997), known professionally as K. Lee Graham, is an American model and beauty queen who was crowned Miss Teen USA 2014.

== Early life and education ==
Graham was born on April 30, 1997, in Florence, South Carolina, as Katherine Lee Graham. She has stated that her nickname "K" comes from her older sister, since when her sister was a baby she could not pronounce Katherine, and called her K instead.

Graham graduated from the University of South Carolina in 2019.

== Pageantry ==
Graham competed in Miss South Carolina Teen USA 2013 and finished as the fourth runner-up. The following year, she competed in Miss South Carolina Teen USA again and was crowned Miss South Carolina Teen USA 2014. At Miss Teen USA 2014, she was crowned the winner, beating the first runner-up Miss Mississippi Teen USA Vaeda Mann.

== Personal life ==
She runs a blog dedicated to empowering women and girls called Live Beautifully and actively participates with her church's child ministry.

Awards and achievements
Preceded by (California) Cassidy Wolf	Miss Teen USA; 2014	Succeeded by (Louisiana) Katherine Haik
Preceded by Tori Sizemore	Miss South Carolina Teen USA; 2014	Succeeded by Wesley Mitchell
