= Miss Teen USA 2013 =

31st edition of the Miss Teen USA competition

- Date: August 10, 2013
- Presenters: Karl Jeno Schmid; Tami Farrell
- Venue: Grand Ballroom, Atlantis Paradise Island, Nassau, The Bahamas
- Broadcaster: Ustream; Xbox Live
- Entrants: 51
- Placements: 16
- Winner: Cassidy Wolf; California
- Congeniality: Jasmine Fuelberth; Nebraska
- Photogenic: Graham Turner; Oklahoma

Miss Teen USA 2013 was the 31st Miss Teen USA pageant, held on August 10, 2013, at Atlantis Paradise Island, Nassau, Bahamas and was hosted by Australian journalist Karl Jeno Schmid and Miss Teen USA 2003 Tami Farrell. Logan West of Connecticut crowned her successor Cassidy Wolf of California at the end of the event. The 50 states and the District of Columbia competed for the title and the pageant was webcast on the official Miss Teen USA website via Ustream and on Xbox Live.

== Results ==
=== Placements ===
The 2013 pageant had a top five and eleven semi-finalists, including a People's Choice semi-finalist voted by the public.

Final results	Contestant
Miss Teen USA 2013	California – Cassidy Wolf
1st Runner-Up	South Carolina – Tori Sizemore
2nd Runner-Up	West Virginia – Haley Holloway
3rd Runner-Up	(Georgia (U.S. state)) Georgia – Julia Martin
4th Runner-Up	Minnesota – Maggie McGill
Top 16	Alabama – Lorin Holcombe; Arkansas – Abby Floyd; Hawaii – Samantha Neyland; Kansas – Alyssa Klinzing; Louisiana – Bailey Hidalgo; Maryland – Hannah Brewer; Missouri – Brenda Smith ‡; New Jersey – Christina Thompson; (New York (state)) New York – Nikki Orlando; Tennessee – Emily Suttle; Wisconsin – Kate Redeker

‡ Voted into Top 16 as America's Choice via Internet/SMS Messaging

=== Special awards ===
Award	Contestant
Miss Congeniality	Nebraska – Jasmine Fuelberth
Miss Photogenic	Oklahoma – Graham Turner

== Judges ==
The Miss Teen USA 2013 judges were:

- Butch Beard
- Lisa Carvalho
- Denise Garrido - Miss World Canada 2010.
- Chuck Labella
- Fred Nelson

== Delegates ==
State	Name	Hometown	Age	Height	Placement	Notes
Alabama	Lorin Holcombe	Alexander City	18	5 ft 6 in 168 cm	Top 16	Later 3rd runner-up at Miss Alabama USA 2018; Later 1st runner-up at Miss Georgia USA 2019
Alaska	Kimberly Agron	Anchorage	18	5 ft 4 in 163 cm		Later Miss Alaska USA 2015 and awarded Miss Congeniality at Miss USA 2015
Arizona	Olivia Argue	Paradise Valley	17	5 ft 7 in 170 cm		Sister of Molly Argue, Miss Arizona Teen USA 2011
Arkansas	Abby Floyd	Searcy	17	5 ft 9 in 175 cm	Top 16	Later Miss Arkansas USA 2016 and top 10 at Miss USA 2016
California	Cassidy Wolf	Temecula	19	5 ft 7 in 170 cm	Miss Teen USA 2013	
Colorado	Chloe Brown	Grand Junction	18	5 ft 6 in 168 cm		Later Miss Colorado USA 2018
Connecticut	Kendall Leary	Wallingford	18	5 ft 5 in 165 cm		
Delaware	Hailey Lawler	Newark	18	5 ft 8 in 173 cm		Originally first runner-up; assumed title after winner Melissa King resigned on February 26, 2013, due to allegations related to a pornographic video.
District of Columbia	Despina Ades	Washington, D.C.	19	5 ft 7 in 170 cm		
Florida	Brianne Bailey	Weston	18	5 ft 11 in 180 cm		
Georgia	Julia Martin	Marietta	18	5 ft 9 in 175 cm	3rd Runner Up	Previously Miss Georgia's Outstanding Teen 2011, top 10 at Miss America's Outstanding Teen 2012
Hawaii	Samantha Neyland	Honolulu	17	5 ft 8 in 173 cm	Top 16	Later Miss Hawaii USA 2020 and top 10 at Miss USA 2020
Idaho	Lorena Haliti	Meridian	17	5 ft 7 in 170 cm		Sister of Erza Haliti, Miss Idaho USA 2011
Illinois	Grayson Hodgkiss	Downers Grove	16	5 ft 6 in 168 cm		
Indiana	Darrian Arch	Chesterton	18	5 ft 7 in 170 cm		Later Miss Indiana USA 2018
Iowa	Morgan Kofoid	Leon	18	5 ft 7 in 170 cm		Later Miss Iowa USA 2020
Kansas	Alyssa Klinzing	Olathe	15	5 ft 8 in 173 cm	Top 16	Later Miss Kansas USA 2019 and top 10 at Miss USA 2019
Kentucky	Gracie Sapp	Lexington	15	5 ft 8 in 173 cm		
Louisiana	Bailey Hidalgo	Denham Springs	15	5 ft 11 in 180 cm	Top 16	
Maine	Delaney Seavey	Portland	17	5 ft 3 in 160 cm		
Maryland	Hannah Brewer	Manchester	16	5 ft 7 in 170 cm	Top 16	Previously competed in Miss America's Outstanding Teen system, she held the titles Miss Mason Dixon's Outstanding Teen 2010, Miss Appalachia's Teen Outstanding Teen in 2011 and Miss Queen State's Outstanding Teen in 2012; Later Miss Maryland 2016 and top 7 at Miss America 2017; Sister of Nicole Brewer, Miss Pennsylvania 2005
Massachusetts	Madyson Milordi	Lynnfield	18	5 ft 7 in 170 cm		
Michigan	Ruby King	Ludington	18	5 ft 8 in 173 cm		
Minnesota	Maggie McGill	Plymouth	19	5 ft 6 in 168 cm	4th Runner Up	
Mississippi	Madison Brock	Crystal Springs	18	5 ft 8 in 173 cm		
Missouri	Brenda Smith	Columbia	19	5 ft 7 in 170 cm	Top 16	Won the "Online Fan Vote" that allowed her to advance to the (Top 16) for the final competition on August 10, 2013; Later 1st runner-up at Miss Georgia USA 2017; Later Mexicana Universal Ciudad de México 2019 and finished 2nd runner-up at Mexicana Universal 2020; Later Señorita Panamá 2021
Montana	Maurissa Gunn	Laurel	17	5 ft 6 in 168 cm		Later Contestant on The Bachelor (season 24) and Bachelor in Paradise (season 7)
Nebraska	Jasmine Fuelberth	Norfolk	16	5 ft 5 in 165 cm	"Miss Congeniality"	Later Miss Nebraska USA 2017
Nevada	Amanda Jenkins	Reno	19	5 ft 5 in 165 cm		Later 1st runner-up at Miss Nevada USA 2016; Later 4th runner-up at Miss Nevada USA 2017
New Hampshire	Kelsea Campbell	Auburn	18	5 ft 10 in 178 cm		
New Jersey	Christina Thompson	Holmdel	17	5 ft 8 in 173 cm	Top 16	Daughter of Hallie Bonnell Thompson, Miss Ohio USA 1987; Later Miss Virginia USA 2021
New Mexico	Addi Smith	Las Cruces	17	5 ft 5 in 165 cm		
New York	Nikki Orlando	Smithtown	16	5 ft 7 in 170 cm	Top 16	
North Carolina	Kelsey Barberio	Apex	17	5 ft 3 in 160 cm		
North Dakota	Emilee Mahar	Fargo	17	5 ft 6 in 168 cm		
Ohio	Brittany Reid	Springfield	18	5 ft 6 in 168 cm		
Oklahoma	Graham Turner	Edmond	17	5 ft 4 in 163 cm	Miss Photogenic	
Oregon	Summer Pilcher	Milwaukie	17	5 ft 7 in 170 cm		Later 2x top 15 semifinalist at Miss Oregon USA
Pennsylvania	Ebone Jimerson	North Wales	18	5 ft 7 in 170 cm		
Rhode Island	Elaine Collado	Providence	17	5 ft 9 in 175 cm		Later Miss Rhode Island USA 2022
South Carolina	Tori Sizemore	Anderson	17	5 ft 10 in 178 cm	1st Runner Up	Later Miss South Carolina USA 2018; Later 4th runner-up at Miss South Carolina 2019 competition
South Dakota	Alexis Rupp	Sioux Falls	18	6 ft 0 in 183 cm		Later 1st runner-up at Miss South Dakota USA 2017; Sister of Delaney Rupp, Miss South Dakota Teen USA 2017
Tennessee	Emily Suttle	Franklin	17	5 ft 7 in 170 cm	Top 16	Later Miss Tennessee USA 2022
Texas	Daniella Rodriguez	Laredo	17	5 ft 8 in 173 cm		Later Miss Texas USA 2016
Utah	Chloe Crump	Highland	16	5 ft 8 in 173 cm		
Vermont	Sophia Hadeka	Fair Haven	15	5 ft 8 in 173 cm		Previously Miss Vermont's Outstanding Teen 2011
Virginia	Caelynn Miller-Keyes	Fredericksburg	18	5 ft 6 in 168 cm		Later Miss North Carolina USA 2018 and first runner-up at Miss USA 2018; Later Contestant on The Bachelor (season 23) and Bachelor in Paradise (season 6)
Washington	Imani Blackmon	Tacoma	18	5 ft 7 in 170 cm		Later Miss Washington USA 2020
West Virginia	Haley Holloway	Morgantown	18	5 ft 9 in 175 cm	2nd Runner Up	Later Miss West Virginia USA 2019
Wisconsin	Kate Redeker	Sheboygan	17	5 ft 10 in 178 cm	Top 16	Later Miss Wisconsin USA 2016
Wyoming	Autumn Olson	Saratoga	18	5 ft 8 in 173 cm		Later Miss Wyoming USA 2016

=== Historical significance ===
- This is the second Miss Teen USA win for California
