= Caitlin Upton =

American model (born 1989)

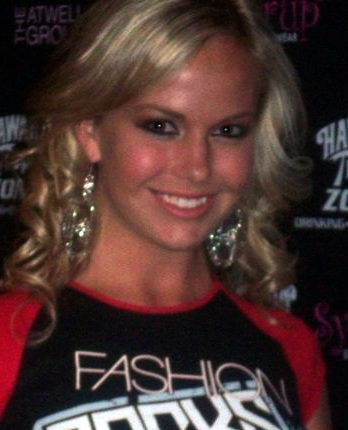
- Upton in 2007
- Born: Lauren Caitlin Upton; March 27, 1989 (age 37); Lexington, South Carolina, U.S.
- Education: Appalachian State University
- Height: 5 ft 10 in (1.78 m)
- Spouse: Charlie McNeil (m. 2016; div. 2019)
- Beauty pageant titleholder
- Title: Miss South Carolina Teen USA 2007
- Hair color: Blonde
- Eye color: Hazel
- Major competition: Miss Teen USA 2007

Lauren Caitlin "Caite" Upton (born March 27, 1989) is an American beauty pageant titleholder who was crowned Miss South Carolina Teen USA 2007 and represented South Carolina at Miss Teen USA 2007 where she placed third runner-up.

She was catapulted into “Internet celebrity” status in 2007, after a response by her at the beauty pageant went viral.

== Career ==
=== 2007 Miss Teen USA pageant ===
Upton became Miss South Carolina Teen USA for 2007 in the November 2006 state pageant. She went on to place as third runner-up in the Miss Teen USA 2007 pageant. Upton gained international notoriety for her response to a question posed to her onstage during the August 2007 national pageant. During the pageant, Upton responded to a question posed by judge Aimee Teegarden: "Recent polls have shown a fifth of Americans can't locate the U.S. on a world map. Why do you think this is?" Upton responded:

I personally believe that U.S. Americans are unable to do so because, um, some people out there in our nation don't have maps and, uh, I believe that our, uh, education like such as, uh, South Africa and, uh, the Iraq and everywhere like such as, and I believe that they should, uh, our education over here in the U.S. should help the U.S., uh, should help South Africa and should help the Iraq and the Asian countries, so we will be able to build up our future.

As a guest on NBC's The Today Show shortly after the pageant, Upton told Ann Curry and Matt Lauer that she was overwhelmed when asked the question and did not comprehend it correctly. The Today Show hosts gave Upton another opportunity to answer. She responded:

Well personally, my friends and I, we know exactly where the United States is on our map. I don't know anyone else who doesn't. And if the statistics are correct, I believe that there should be more emphasis on geography in our education so people will learn how to read maps better.

Both Curry and Lauer, along with unseen crew members, applauded her response.

=== Mental health struggles ===
After her response at the 2007 Miss Teen USA pageant went viral, Upton experienced significant public criticism and personal difficulties. In a 2015 interview with New York Magazine, she disclosed that the widespread backlash contributed to a period of severe depression and suicidal thoughts. Upton described this time as "very dark" and noted that she kept her struggles private, confiding only in a few trusted individuals, including her fiancé, best friend, and eventually her mother.

Upton recounted specific incidents of harassment, including being taunted by a group of students at the University of South Carolina and receiving a threatening letter in her parents' mailbox. The letter contained hostile content, urging her to "go die" due to the pageant incident. Upton credited her family and close friends with providing essential support during this difficult time.

=== Post-pageant career ===
Upton has appeared in numerous national commercials, on Tosh.0, as a correspondent for Jimmy Kimmel Live!, as a contestant on CBS's The Amazing Race, as a guest host on MTV's Ridiculousness, and in a recurring role on the HBO series "Funny or Die." She has also modeled in numerous advertising campaigns and shot a Maxim spread and behind-the-scenes video for Maxim.com in 2010.

Upton has also modeled in advertisements for companies such as Nautica and Wrangler and has appeared in national magazines such as Seventeen, Cosmo Girl, and American Cheerleader. She later signed a deal with Donald Trump's modeling agency in New York City.

Upton appeared in Weezer's music video "Pork and Beans", which was released on May 23, 2008, where the microphone she held became a lightsaber. In the same video, Upton blends a placard reading "Maps" in a Blendtec blender.

In 2010, Upton was a contestant on The Amazing Race 16, where she is credited as Caite Upton and finished the race in third place with her then-boyfriend Brent Horne.

== Online abuse ==
=== Comments by Tucker Carlson ===
In March 2019, audio clips surfaced of Tucker Carlson making controversial remarks about Upton in 2007 shortly after the pageant. Carlson, speaking on Florida-based radio program The Bubba the Love Sponge Show, repeatedly denigrated Upton's intelligence and speculated on her sexual behavior.

=== Comments by JD Vance ===
In 2024, in anticipation of a CNN interview with presidential candidate Kamala Harris, Republican vice-presidential candidate JD Vance posted a video of Upton giving the infamous answer about maps with the caption "BREAKING: I have gotten ahold of the full Kamala Harris CNN interview."

The post received criticism for reviving a moment in Upton's life that she had previously described as traumatic.

In a follow-up interview with CNN, Vance stated that he was unaware of the negative impact the clip has had on Upton's mental health. While he expressed goodwill towards Upton, he declined to apologize, suggesting that humor has a place in political discourse.

Upton addressed the situation in a statement to Vanity Fair, noting her disappointment that the moment was still being referenced after 17 years. She highlighted the ongoing issue of online bullying and encouraged those experiencing similar challenges to seek support from relevant organizations, stating, "It's a shame that 17 years later this is still being brought up. Regardless of political beliefs, one thing I do know is that social media and online bullying needs to stop."

== Personal life ==
Upton married personal trainer Charlie McNeil in 2016 and they divorced in 2019.
