= Amanda Penix =

American model (born 1978)

- Born: Amanda Rochelle Penix; September 15, 1978 (age 48); Oklahoma, United States
- Beauty pageant titleholder
- Title: Miss Oklahoma Teen USA 1997; Miss Oklahoma USA 2000
- Hair color: Blonde
- Major competitions: Miss Oklahoma Teen USA 1997; Miss Oklahoma USA 2000; Miss Teen USA 1997; Miss USA 2000

Amanda Rochelle Penix (born September 15, 1978) is a model from Oklahoma who was crowned Miss Oklahoma Teen USA 1997 and Miss Oklahoma USA 2000. Penix was also a finalist in Miss Teen USA 1997 and received an honorable mention in Miss USA 2000.

== Personal life ==
Hailing from Oklahoma, United States, Penix attended Bethel High School in Shawnee, Oklahoma until 1996. Four years later, Penix graduated from Oklahoma Baptist University with a degree in early childhood education. In 2000, Penix worked for Randy's Signs, her parents' company. Penix is heavily involved in charity work, and actively speaks to teens about abstaining from sex until marriage.

== Awards ==
- Earned an academic and art scholarship from Oklahoma Baptist University
- Graduated from high school in three years, earning the title of Salutatorian
- Riddle Scholarship
- Who's Who Among American High School Students

Preceded by Dia Webb	Miss Oklahoma USA; 2000	Succeeded by Cortney Phillips
Preceded by Latoya Farley	Miss Oklahoma Teen USA; 1997	Succeeded by Tara Baker
