= Miss Oklahoma USA =

Beauty contest

- Formation: 1952
- Type: Beauty pageant
- Headquarters: Shawnee
- Location: Kansas
- Members: Miss USA
- Official language: English
- Key people: John M. Vannatta; Jason Vannatta; Jennifer Vannatta-Fisher, State Pageant Director
- Website: Official website

The Miss Oklahoma USA competition is the pageant that selects the representative for the state of Oklahoma in the Miss USA pageant. This pageant is directed by Vanbros and Associates, headquartered in Shawnee, Kansas. In 1997, Oklahoma joined the Vanbros group of state pageants for the Miss USA and Teen USA system.

Olivia Jordan was crowned Miss USA 2015 on July 12, 2015, in Baton Rouge, Louisiana, becoming the first contestant from Oklahoma to win the national title, and as well the 34th state to have the national title. Oklahoma is in the top 20 states in terms of the number of semi-finalists.

Seven Miss Oklahoma USA titleholders have previously competed at Miss Teen USA, six as Miss Oklahoma Teen USA, and one as Miss Illinois Teen USA. Four have also competed at Miss America.

Annamaria Thomas of Miami was crowned Miss Oklahoma USA 2026 on June 14, 2026, at OCCC Performing Arts Center in Oklahoma City. She will represent Oklahoma at Miss USA 2026.

== Gallery of titleholders ==
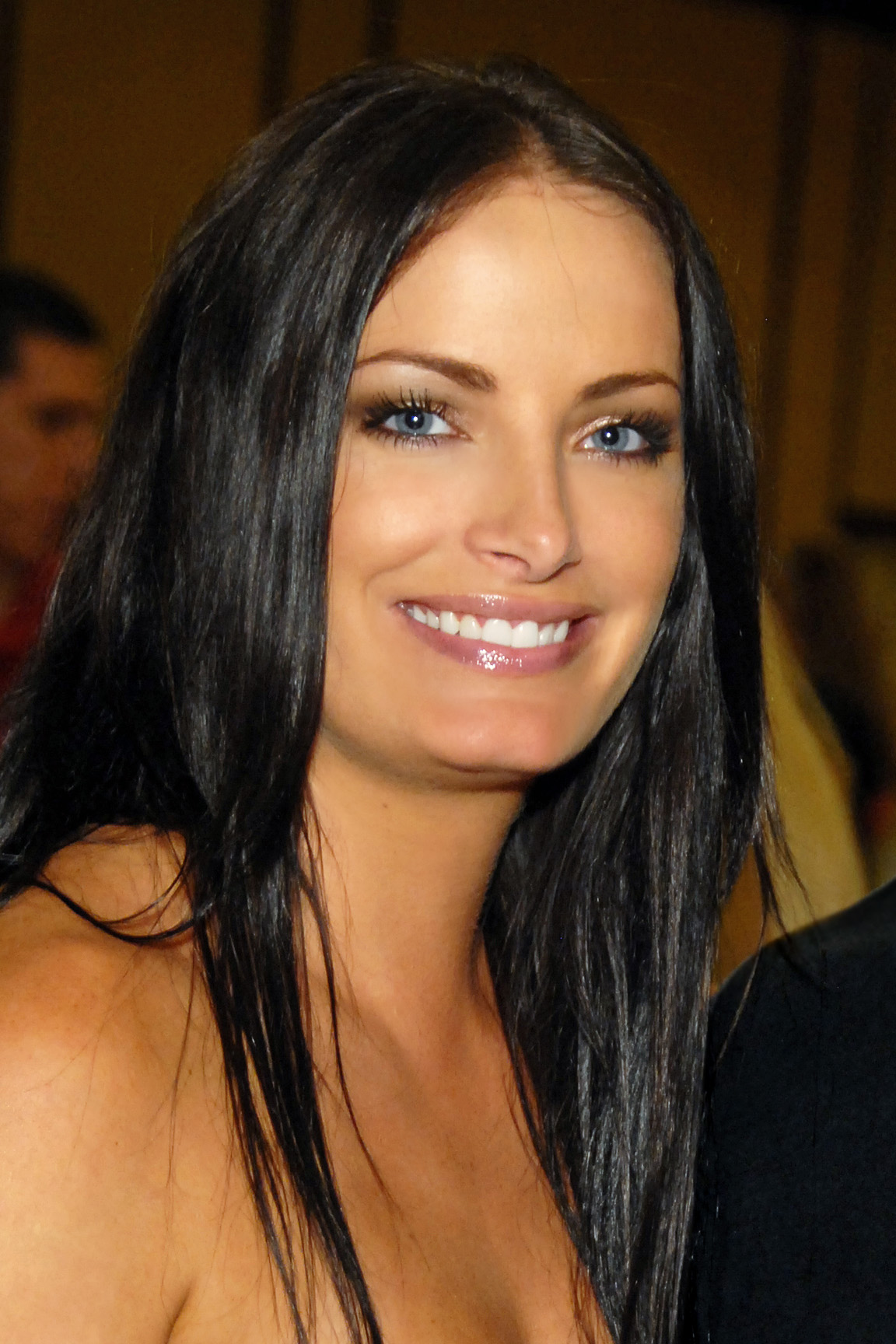
Kasie Head, Miss Oklahoma USA 2002

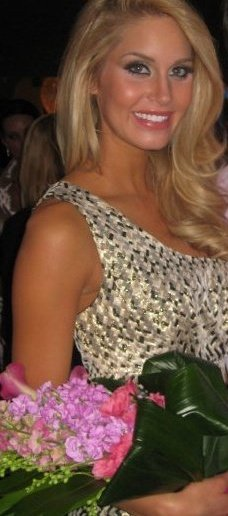
Morgan Woolard, Miss Oklahoma Teen USA 2006 & Miss Oklahoma USA 2010

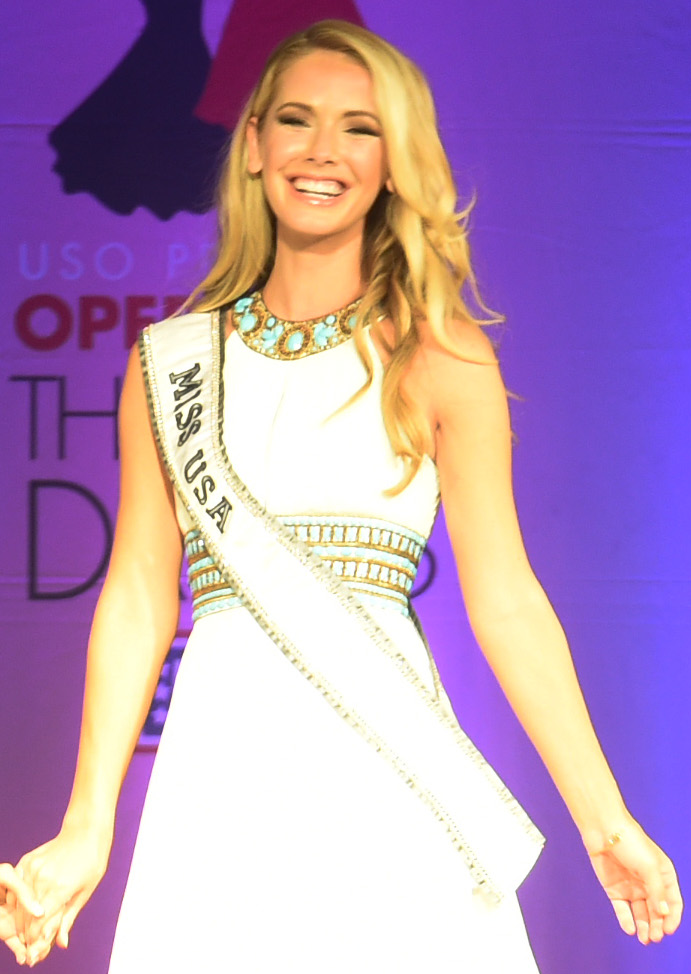
Olivia Jordan, Miss Oklahoma USA 2015, Miss World United States 2013 & Miss USA 2015

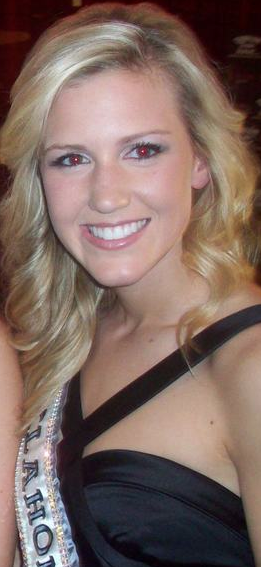
Taylor Gorton, Miss Oklahoma USA 2016 & Miss Oklahoma Teen USA 2008

== Results summary ==
=== Placements ===
- Miss USA: Olivia Jordan (2015)
- 1st runners-up: Jill Scheffert (1989), Morgan Woolard (2010)
- 2nd runners-up: Triana Browne (2019), Mariah Davis (2020), Danika Christopherson (2024)
- 3rd runners-up: Lindsay Hill (2004), Lindsey Jo Harrington (2008)
- 4th runner-up: Trula Birchfield (1952)
- Top 6: Julie Khoury (1991), Heather Crickard (1996)
- Top 10/12: Nancy Lippold (1978), Mignon Merchant (1983), Julia Murdock (1984), Sophia Henderson (1985), Teresa Lucas (1986), Tamara Walker (1988), DuSharme Carter (1995), Trisha Stillwell (1997), Dia Webb (1999), Cortney Phillips (2001), Star Williams (2003), Laci Scott (2005), Lauren Lundeen (2012), Zoe Ferraro (2025)
- Top 15/20: Roberta Mosier (1963), Jackie Maloney (1964), Cheryl Semrad (1965), Brooklynne Young (2014), Taylor Gorton (2016)

Oklahoma holds a record of 30 placements at Miss USA.

=== Awards ===
- Miss Photogenic: Cheryl Semrad (1965)
- Best State Costume: Gayla Bryan (1975), Albreuna Gonzaque (2021; 3rd place)
- FLIXXE Ambassador Award: Annamaria Thomas (2026)

== Winners ==
Color key

- Declared as Winner
- Ended as runner-up
- Ended as one of the finalists or semifinalists

Year	Name	Hometown	Age^{[^]}	Local title	Placement at Miss USA	Special awards at Miss USA	Notes
2026	Annamaria Thomas	Miami	23	Miss Ottawa County		FLIXXE Ambassador Award	
2025	Zoe Ferraro	Bixby	25	Miss Warr Acres	Top 10		Previously Miss Oklahoma Teen USA 2018
2024	Danika Christopherson	Lawton	22	Miss The Village	2nd runner-up		Previously Miss Oklahoma Teen USA 2020; Top 16 at Miss Teen USA 2020
2023	Liv Walbeck	Norman	21	Miss Norman			
2022	Ashley Ehrhart	Oklahoma City	25	Miss Heart of Oklahoma			Previously National Sweetheart 2021; Professional dancer of Oklahoma City Thunder Girls
2021	Albreuna Gonzaque	Warr Acres	28	Miss North Oklahoma City		Best State Costume – 3rd Place	Shortest reigning Miss Oklahoma USA at 9 months and 22 days
2020	Mariah Davis	Moore	24	Miss Moore	2nd runner-up		Longest reigning Miss Oklahoma USA at 1 year, 5 months and 16 days
2019	Triana Browne	Tulsa	25	Miss Riverside	2nd runner-up		Previously Miss Oklahoma 2017
2018	Cheyene Darling	Oklahoma City	19	Miss South Oklahoma City			
2017	Alex Smith	Mooreland	22	Miss NorthWest Oklahoma			
2016	Taylor Gorton	Glenpool	23	Miss South Tulsa	Top 15		Previously National American Miss Junior Teen 2006; Previously Miss Oklahoma Teen USA 2008; Top 15 at Miss Teen USA 2008; Previously National American Miss Teen 2009
2015	Alexandra "Alex" Miller	Oklahoma City	26	Miss Oklahoma City	did not compete		Originally first runner-up, assumed the title when Olivia Jordan won Miss USA; Later became Miss 52 USA 2016 in a nationwide contest and competed at Miss USA 2016
2015	Olivia Jordan	Tulsa	26	Miss Tulsa	Miss USA 2015		Previously Miss World America 2013; Top 20 at Miss World 2013; Later 2nd runner-up at Miss Universe 2015
2014	Brooklynne Young	Norman	19	Miss Metro Tulsa	Top 20 Quarter-Finalist		
2013	Makenzie Muse	Yukon	20	Miss Surrey Hills			
2012	Lauren Lundeen	Edmond	20	Miss Edmond	Top 10 Finalist		
2011	Kaitlyn Smith	Norman	22	Miss North Norman			
2010	Morgan Woolard	Moore	20	Miss Stillwater	1st Runner-up		Previously Miss Oklahoma Teen USA 2006; Top 15 at Miss Teen USA 2006
2009	Lauren Lunday	Altus	25	Miss Southwest Oklahoma			
2008	Lindsey Jo Harrington	Frederick	21	Miss Southwest Oklahoma	3rd Runner-up		
2007	Caitlin Simmons	Lawton	21	Miss Jenks			
2006	Robyn Watkins	Norman	24	Miss Norman			
2005	Laci Scott	Oklahoma City	18		Top 10 Finalist		Was contestant on NBC game show Fear Factor in 2005 on the Miss USA episode #5.29 (4th place)
2004	Lindsay Diane Hill	Mooreland	19		3rd Runner-up		
2003	Star Williams	Oklahoma City	22		Top 10 Semi-finalist		
2002	Kasie Head	Braman	21				Briefcase model on Deal or No Deal
2001	Cortney Phillips	Yukon	21		Top 10 Semi-finalist		
2000	Amanda Rochelle Penix	Shawnee	20				Previously Miss Oklahoma Teen USA 1997, finished 6th at Miss Teen USA 1997
1999	Dia Webb	Boise City	25		Top 10 Semi-finalist		Niece of singer/songwriter/composer Jimmy Webb
1998	Anne-Marie Dixon	Norman	21				Previously Miss Illinois Teen USA 1995, finished 5th at Miss Teen USA 1995
1997	Trisha Stillwell	Edmond	21	Miss Oklahoma City	Top 10 Semi-finalist		
1996	Heather Lynn Crickard	Oklahoma City	25		Top 6 Finalist		
1995	DuSharme Carter	Oklahoma City	24		Top 12 Semi-finalist		Previously Miss Oklahoma 1992; 4th Runner up at Miss America 1993
1994	Angela Parrick	Oklahoma City					
1993	Brenda Caudle	Oklahoma City					
1992	Maya Walker	Oklahoma City	24				Previously Miss Colorado 1988; 1st Runner up at Miss America 1989
1991	Julie Khoury	Oklahoma City	22		Top 6 Finalist		Previously Miss Oklahoma Teen USA 1985
1990	Lauralynn Norton	Tulsa	22				Spokesmodel on Star Search 1990, Toured with USO '90
1989	Jill Scheffert	Oklahoma City	20		1st Runner-up		4th Runner-up at Miss World 1989
1988	Tamara Walker	Norman	18		Top 10 Semi-finalist		
1987	Dyan Rody	Oklahoma City		Miss Oklahoma City			
1986	Teresa Lucas	Oklahoma City	23		Top 10 Semi-finalist		
1985	Sophia Henderson	Tulsa	23		Top 10 Semi-finalist		
1984	Julia Murdock	Shawnee	18		Top 10 Semi-finalist		
1983	Mignon Merchant	Oklahoma City	22		Top 12 Semi-finalist		Later Miss Oklahoma 1986
1982	Jill Liebmann	Oklahoma City					Mother of Lauren Hudman, Miss Nevada Teen USA 2008 and Britney Barnhart Miss Nevada Teen USA 2018, and Mrs. Nevada 2016
1981	Stacey Loach	Oklahoma City					
1980	Martha Streightoff	Norman					
1979	Susan Gibson	Norman					
1978	Nancy Lippold	Norman			Top 12 Semi-finalist		
1977	Kathy Malchar	Dill City					
1976	Lori Hansen	Alva					
1975	Gayla Bryan	Oklahoma City	22		Best State Costume		
1974	Yugonda Willits	Enid					
1973	Martha Buchanan	Stillwater	24				
1972	Pam Vennerberg	Midwest City		Miss Midwest City			
1971	Kim Hardesty	Tulsa					
1970	Haroldy Evelyn "Harry" Walkup	Del City	20				
1969	Deborah Federsen	El Reno					
1968	Linda Bertozzi	Oklahoma City					
1967	Becky Berry	Norman					
1966	Melva Brown	Oklahoma City					
1965	Cheryl Semrad	Oklahoma City			Top 15 Semi-finalist	Miss Photogenic	2nd Runner-up in the 1965 Maid of Cotton Pageant
1964	Jackie Maloney	Oklahoma City			Top 15 Semi-finalist		
1963	Roberta Ann Mosier	Tulsa			Top 15		
1962	DID NOT COMPETE						
1961	DID NOT COMPETE						
1960	Suzanne Moore	Oklahoma City					
1959	Sondra Osbourne	Oklahoma City					
1958	DID NOT COMPETE						
1957	Rose Mary Raab	Oklahoma City					
1956	DID NOT COMPETE						
1955	DID NOT COMPETE						
1954	DID NOT COMPETE						
1953	Barbara Bond	Oklahoma City					
1952	Trula Birchfield	Oklahoma City			4th Runner-up		

^{^} Age at the time of the Miss USA pageant
