= Miss Oklahoma Teen USA =

Beauty pageant organization

- Formation: 1983
- Type: Beauty pageant
- Headquarters: Shawnee
- Location: Kansas
- Members: Miss Teen USA
- Official language: English
- Key people: John M. Vannatta; Jason Vannatta; Jennifer Vannatta-Fisher, State Pageant Director
- Website: Official Website

The Miss Oklahoma Teen USA competition is the pageant that selects the representative for the state of Oklahoma in the Miss Teen USA pageant. This pageant is directed by Vanbros and Associates, headquartered in Shawnee, Kansas. In 1997, Oklahoma joined the Vanbros group of state pageants for the Miss USA and Teen USA system.

Oklahoma is in the top 5 most successful states at Miss Teen USA in terms of number and value of placements. Oklahoma's best performance came in the 1980s through the early 1990s. After Oklahoma was taken over by Vanbros there was a six-year lapse, before Nikki Carver brought the state back into the semi-finals in 2003. Oklahoma has produced one Miss Teen USA, Allison Brown, who won in 1986 becoming the 4th state that won the Miss Teen USA title for the first time. The state's most recent placement was in 2023, when Jaselyn Rossman finished in the top 20.

Six Oklahoma teens have crossed over to win the Miss Oklahoma USA title and compete at Miss USA, with Morgan Woolard being the most successful with a 1st runner-up placement at Miss USA 2010.

Chloe Braxton of Tulsa, was crowned Miss Oklahoma Teen USA 2026 on June 14, 2026, at OCCC Performing Arts Center in Oklahoma. She will represent Oklahoma at Miss Teen USA 2026.

== Gallery of titleholders ==
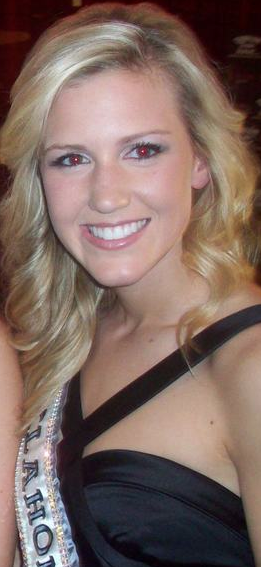
Taylor Gorton, Miss Oklahoma Teen USA 2008 & Miss Oklahoma USA 2016

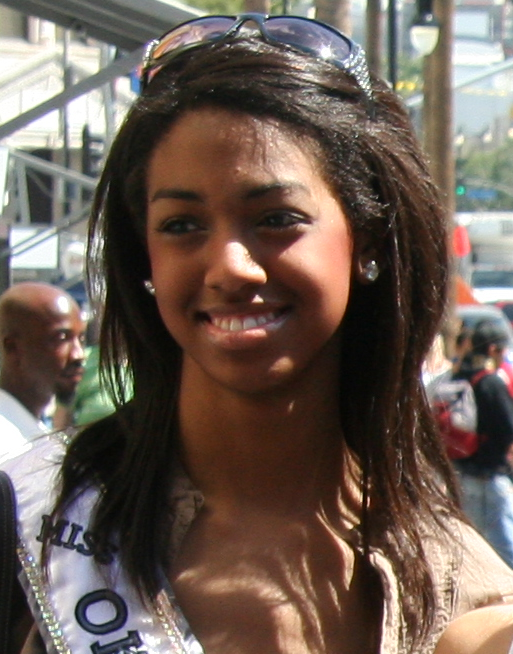
Paige Hill, Miss Oklahoma Teen USA 2007

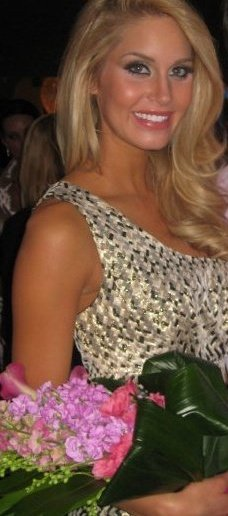
Morgan Woolard, Miss Oklahoma Teen USA 2006 and Miss Oklahoma USA 2010 after placing first runner-up at Miss USA 2010

== Results summary ==
=== Placements ===
- Miss Teen USA: Allison Brown (1986)
- 1st runner-up: Angela Logan (1992)
- 2nd runner-up: Ruthie Richey (2025)
- 3rd runners-up: RaeLynn Coffman (1987), Jessica Morgan (2012)
- Top 6: Amanda Penix (1997)
- Top 10: Jaime Brashier (1984), Stacy Folsum (1989), Latoya Farley (1996), Crystal Glidden (2005)
- Top 12: Rachael Schilder (1991)
- Top 15/16/20: Nikki Carver (2003), Morgan Woolard (2006), Taylor Gorton (2008), Kandis Holt (2010), Brooklynne Bond (2014), Cherokee Pearce (2015), Baylee Ogle (2017), Abigail Billings (2019), Danika Christopherson (2020), Haleigh Hurst (2022), Jaselyn Rossman (2023)

Oklahoma holds a record of 22 placements at Miss Teen USA.

=== Awards ===
- Miss Congeniality: Shelly Forrest (1995)
- Miss Photogenic: Jessica Morgan (2012), Graham Turner (2013)
- Best State Costume: Haleigh Hurst (2022)

== Winners ==
Color key

- Declared as Winner
- Ended as runner-up
- Ended as one of the finalists or semifinalists

Year	Name	Hometown	Age^{1}	Local Title	Placement at Miss Teen USA	Special awards at Miss Teen USA	Notes
2026	Chloe Braxton	Tulsa	TBA	Miss Tulsa Teen			Resigned September 14, 2026.
2025	Ruthie Richey	Norman	19	Miss Norman Teen	2nd runner-up		
2024	Megan Lamza	Wright City	18	Miss Southeast Oklahoma Teen			
2023	Jaselyn Nicole Rossman	Sapulpa	19	Miss Sapulpa Teen	Top 20		Later Miss Oklahoma 2026
2022	Haleigh Hurst	Norman	19	Miss University City Teen	Top 16	Best State Costume	Previously Miss High School America 2020; Eligible as a student of University of Oklahoma at the time of crowning
2021	Hunter Gorton	Glenpool	18	Miss South Tulsa Teen			Sister of Taylor Gorton, Miss Oklahoma Teen USA 2008 and Miss Oklahoma USA 2016
2020	Danika Christopherson	Lawton	18	Miss Southwest Oklahoma Teen	Top 16		Later Miss Oklahoma USA 2024; 2nd Runner-up at Miss USA 2024
2019	Abigail Billings	Oklahoma City	17	Miss Woodward Teen	Top 15		
2018	Zoe Janae Ferraro	Warr Acres	17	Miss Warr Acres Teen			Later Miss Oklahoma USA 2025; Top 10 at Miss USA 2025
2017	Baylee Ogle	Chickasha	18	Miss South Oklahoma City Teen	Top 15		
2016	Hellen Smith	Oklahoma City	16	Miss Oklahoma City Teen			Sister of Miss Oklahoma's Outstanding Teen 2017- Evelyn Smith
2015	Cherokee Pearce	Owasso	19	Miss Owasso Teen	Top 15		
2014	Brooklynne Bond	Tulsa	16	Miss Greater Tulsa Teen	Top 15		
2013	Graham Turner	Edmond	17	Miss Edmond Teen		Miss Photogenic	
2012	Jessica Lee Morgan	Yukon	17	Miss Yukon Teen	3rd runner-up	Miss Photogenic	
2011	Alma Yesenia Sandoval	Oklahoma City	18	Miss Canadian County Teen			
2010	Kandis Holt	Broken Bow	16	Miss Broken Bow Teen	Top 15		
2009	Chelsea Rae Colvard	Tulsa	17	Miss South Tulsa Teen			Sister of Miss Oklahoma's Outstanding Teen 2006- Molly Colvard
2008	Taylor Dawn Gorton	Glenpool	16	Miss South Tulsa Teen	Top 15		National American Miss Jr. Teen 2006.; Later Miss Oklahoma USA 2016 and Top 15 at Miss USA 2016.
2007	Paige Hill	Oklahoma City	16	Miss North Oklahoma Teen			
2006	Morgan Elizabeth Woolard	Moore	17	Miss South Oklahoma Teen	Top 15		Later Miss Oklahoma USA 2010 and first runner up at Miss USA 2010
2005	Crystal Michelle Glidden	Noble	18		Top 10		
2004	Caitlin Noel Graham	Edmond	16				
2003	Nikki Raecine Carver	Norman	18		Top 15		
2002	Joy Cometti	Coalgate	18				
2001	Lindsey Camp	Edmond	17				
2000	Kristin Vaughan	Broken Arrow	17				
1999	Ashley Bowen	Idabel	18				
1998	Tara Ann Baker	Bixby	17				
1997	Amanda Rochelle Penix	Shawnee	18	Miss Shawnee Teen	Top 6		Later Miss Oklahoma USA 2000
1996	LaToya Farley	Tulsa	15		Top 10		
1995	Shelly Lynn Forrest	Moore	17			Miss Congeniality	
1994	Summer Allison Riley	Tuttle	17	Miss Tuttle Teen			
1993	Stacie Caroline Case	Tuttle	17				
1992	Angela Logan	Tuttle	16		1st runner-up		
1991	Rachel Childers	Oklahoma City	17		Top 12		
1990	Carmin James	Boise City	19				
1989	Stacy Folsom	Edmond	17	Miss Edmond Teen	Top 10		
1988	Linda Parsons	Clinton	18				
1987	Jannetta Raelynn Coffman	Moore	17		3rd runner-up		
1986	Allison Elaine Brown	Edmond	17		Miss Teen USA 1986		competed as "Miss Teen USA" at Miss USA 1987
1985	Julie Elizabeth Khoury	Oklahoma City	18				Later Miss Oklahoma USA 1991, finished in top 6 in Miss USA 1991
1984	Jamie Rae Breashears	Oklahoma City	17		Top 10		
1983	Lorna Webb	Ada	16				

^{1} Age at the time of the Miss Teen USA pageant
