= Vanessa Semrow =

American model (born 1984)

- Born: Vanessa Marie Semrow; Rhinelander, Wisconsin, U.S.
- Height: 5 ft 5 in (1.65 m)
- Beauty pageant titleholder
- Title: Miss Wisconsin Teen USA 2002; Miss Teen USA 2002
- Hair color: Brown
- Eye color: Hazel
- Major competition: Miss Teen USA 2002 (winner)

Vanessa Marie Semrow is an American model and beauty queen who won Miss Teen USA 2002.

== Personal life ==
Semrow was born as Vanessa Marie Semrow in Rhinelander, Wisconsin. Her mother is Thai, her father American.

== Pageantry ==
Semrow won the Miss Wisconsin Teen USA title on October 15, 2001, in a pageant paying tribute to the events of September 11 that year. In August 2002, she represented Wisconsin in the Miss Teen USA 2002 pageant and won the competition.

As Miss Teen USA, Semrow represented the Miss Universe Organization and lived in a Trump apartment in New York City, the first Miss Teen USA titleholder to live there full-time. During her reign, Semrow traveled to Kuwait and Saudi Arabia on a USO tour, raised money for charities, and attended celebrity events. Her reign ended on August 13, 2003, when she crowned Tami Farrell Miss Teen USA 2003.

Awards and achievements
Preceded by Marissa Whitley, Missouri	Miss Teen USA; 2002	Succeeded by Tami Farrell, Oregon
Preceded by Kelly Ann Langford	Miss Wisconsin Teen USA; 2002	Succeeded by Jenna Christine Tighe
