= Allison Brown =

American model

- Born: Allison Elaine Brown; August 23, 1968 (age 58); Edmond, Oklahoma, U.S.
- Other names: Alli Brown; Allison Brown Young
- Height: 5 ft (1.5 m)
- Beauty pageant titleholder
- Title: Miss Oklahoma Teen USA 1986; Miss Teen USA 1986
- Hair color: Blonde
- Eye color: Green
- Major competitions: Miss Teen USA 1986; Miss USA 1987

Allison Elaine Brown (born August 23, 1968) is an American actress and beauty queen who was Miss Teen USA 1986. Brown also competed in the Miss USA pageant.

== Biography ==
Brown grew up in Edmond, Oklahoma, and attended Edmond Memorial High School. She was born to Susanne and H. Jack Brown. Her mother, who had Native American roots, was a feminist who once picketed beauty pageants. Her Irish father was a vascular surgeon who died in the spring of 1987.

Brown won the Miss Oklahoma Teen USA 1986 title after finishing first runner-up the previous year. She then competed at Miss Teen USA 1986 pageant, where she became the first titleholder from Oklahoma to win the Miss Teen USA title. She reigned as Miss Teen USA for 18 months, longer than any titleholder at the time. This was later surpassed by Kaliegh Garris in October 2020. As Miss Teen USA, she traveled to Bermuda, Guatemala, Chile, and Singapore. During her year as Miss Teen USA, she moved to California to study acting.

Brown competed in the Miss USA 1987 pageant held in Albuquerque, New Mexico, but did not place. She later judged the Miss Teen USA 1988 and 1995 pageants.

Following her year as Miss Teen USA, Brown appeared in episodes of Free Spirit and Sister Kate.

In 1991, Brown played the role of Sarah Horton on the NBC Daytime soap opera Days of Our Lives.

She has been mentioned as a figure from Edmond and named in a travel guide.
