= Cassidy Wolf =

American model

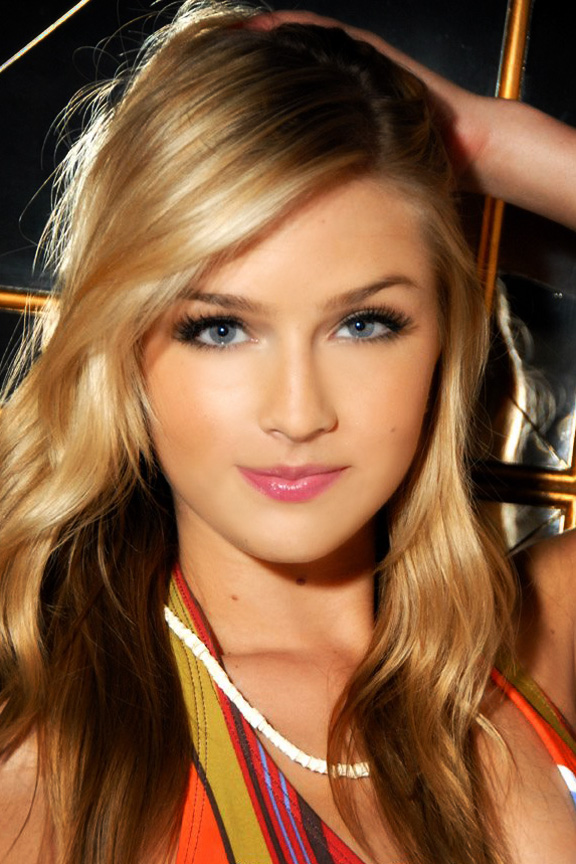
- Wolf in 2012
- Born: Cassidy Marie Wolf; July 5, 1994 (age 32); Temecula, California, U.S.
- Beauty pageant titleholder
- Title: Miss California Teen USA 2013; Miss Teen USA 2013
- Hair color: Blonde
- Eye color: Grey
- Major competitions: Miss California Teen USA 2012 (1st Runner-Up); Miss California Teen USA 2013; (Winner); Miss Teen USA 2013; (Winner)

Cassidy Marie Wolf (born July 5, 1994) is an American TV host, model and beauty queen who was crowned Miss Teen USA 2013.

== Pageants ==
While attending Great Oak High School in Temecula, she was crowned Miss Greater San Diego Teen USA. Wolf was crowned Miss California Teen USA in 2013, and later the same year Miss Teen USA 2013 on August 10, 2013, in The Bahamas. Wolf was crowned the 31st Miss Teen USA.

== Victim of sextortion ==
Wolf was a victim of sextortion, after photographs of her were hacked and used in an attempt to blackmail her. The FBI ran a probe after Wolf reported a threatening email demanding a 'special performance' for the hacker, whom she suspected to be Jared James Abrahams, her former high school classmate. Wolf never created the video demanded, and on September 26, 2013, Abrahams surrendered to FBI agents in Orange County. In November 2013, Abrahams pleaded guilty to hacking over 100-150 women and installing the highly invasive malware Blackshades on their computers in order to obtain explicit images and videos of them. One of his victims was a 14-year-old girl. On March 18, 2014; Abrahams was sentenced to 18 months in federal prison. Legal scholar Star Kashman speculates that Abrahams used the technique of Google dorking to find and target Cassidy Wolf's webcam online.

== Achievements ==
Wolf was a semi-finalist for the Los Angeles Music Center Spotlight Awards and a Merit Recipient for the National Young Arts Foundation. She has also been awarded several talent scholarships to Joffrey Ballet in New York City and was invited to be part of the professional Trainee Jazz Program.

== Career ==
Wolf was the co-host of Catfish: The TV Show on MTV for season 4 episode 2.

Awards and achievements
Preceded by (Connecticut) Logan West	Miss Teen USA; 2013	Succeeded by (South Carolina) K. Lee Graham
Preceded by Alexa Jones	Miss California Teen USA; 2013	Succeeded by Chloe Hatfield
