= Miss South Carolina Teen USA =

Beauty pageant competition

- Formation: 1983
- Type: Beauty pageant
- Headquarters: Aiken
- Location: South Carolina
- Members: Miss Teen USA
- Official language: English
- Website: Official website

The Miss South Carolina Teen USA pageant is the competition that selects the representatives for the state of South Carolina in the Miss Teen USA pageant. The pageant has been directed by RPM Productions since its inception.

South Carolina is in the top 10 most successful states at Miss Teen USA in terms of number and value of placements, this state has placed 18 times at Miss Teen USA and has produced two winners. Vanessa Minnillo won the Miss Teen USA title on August 17, 1998, in Shreveport, Louisiana and later went on to become successful in the entertainment industry and K. Lee Graham won the Miss Teen USA title on August 2, 2014, in Nassau, Bahamas.

South Carolina holds the record for the most Miss Congeniality awards. It has won three: 1994, 1998, and 2002. In 1998, Minnillo became the first teenager to win both Miss Congeniality and the national title, and is one of only two contestants to achieve this.

Nine Miss South Carolina Teen USA titleholders have won the Miss South Carolina USA title and competed at Miss USA.

Isabella Brandt of Charleston was crowned Miss South Carolina Teen USA 2026 on June 28, 2026, at The Spartanburg Marriott Hotel in Spartanburg. She will represent South Carolina at Miss Teen USA 2026.

== Gallery of titleholders ==
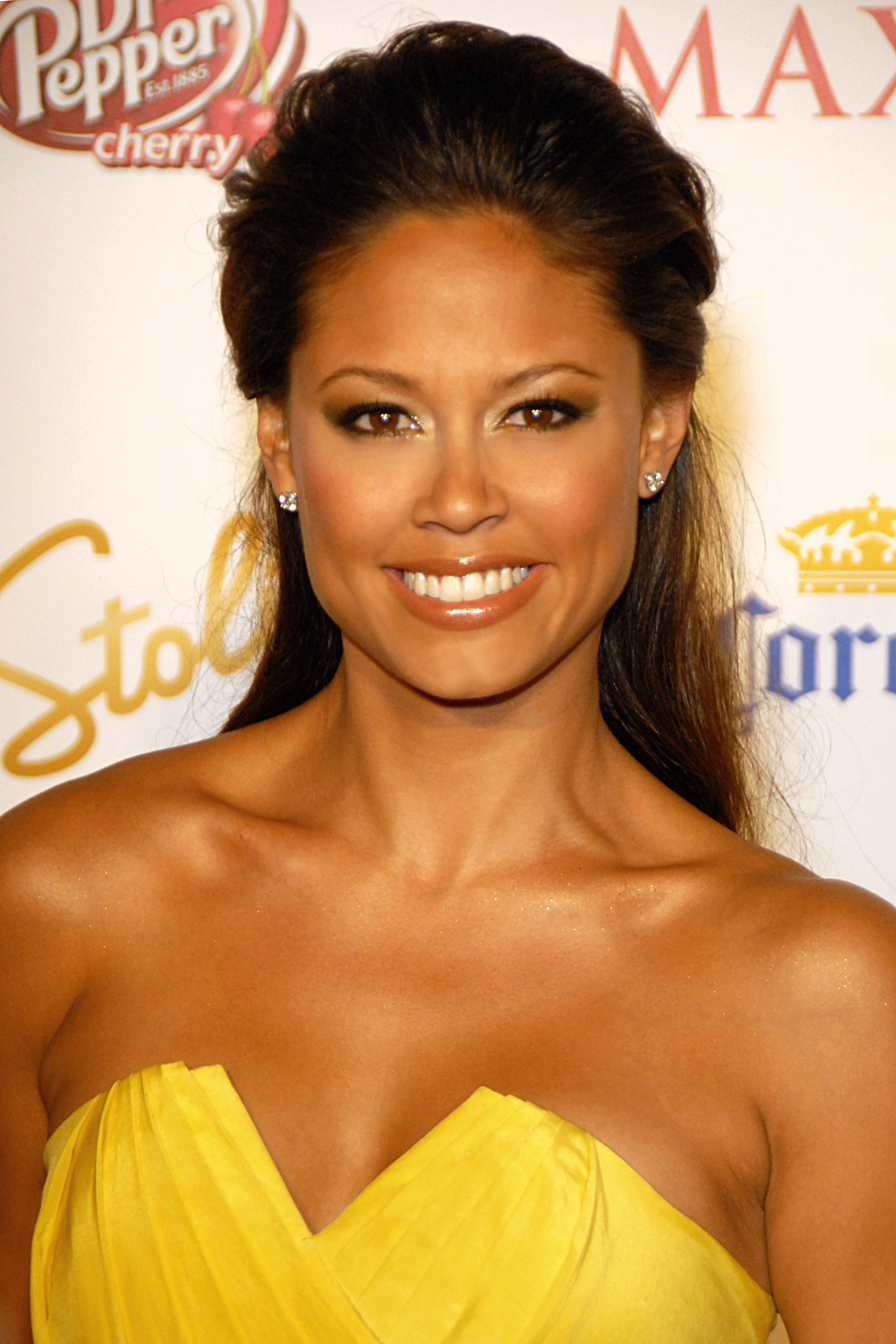
Vanessa Minnillo, Miss South Carolina Teen USA 1998 & Miss Teen USA 1998

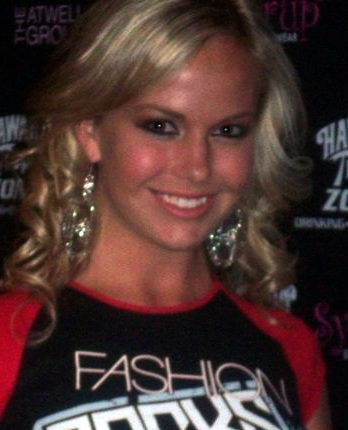
Caitlin Upton, Miss South Carolina Teen USA 2007

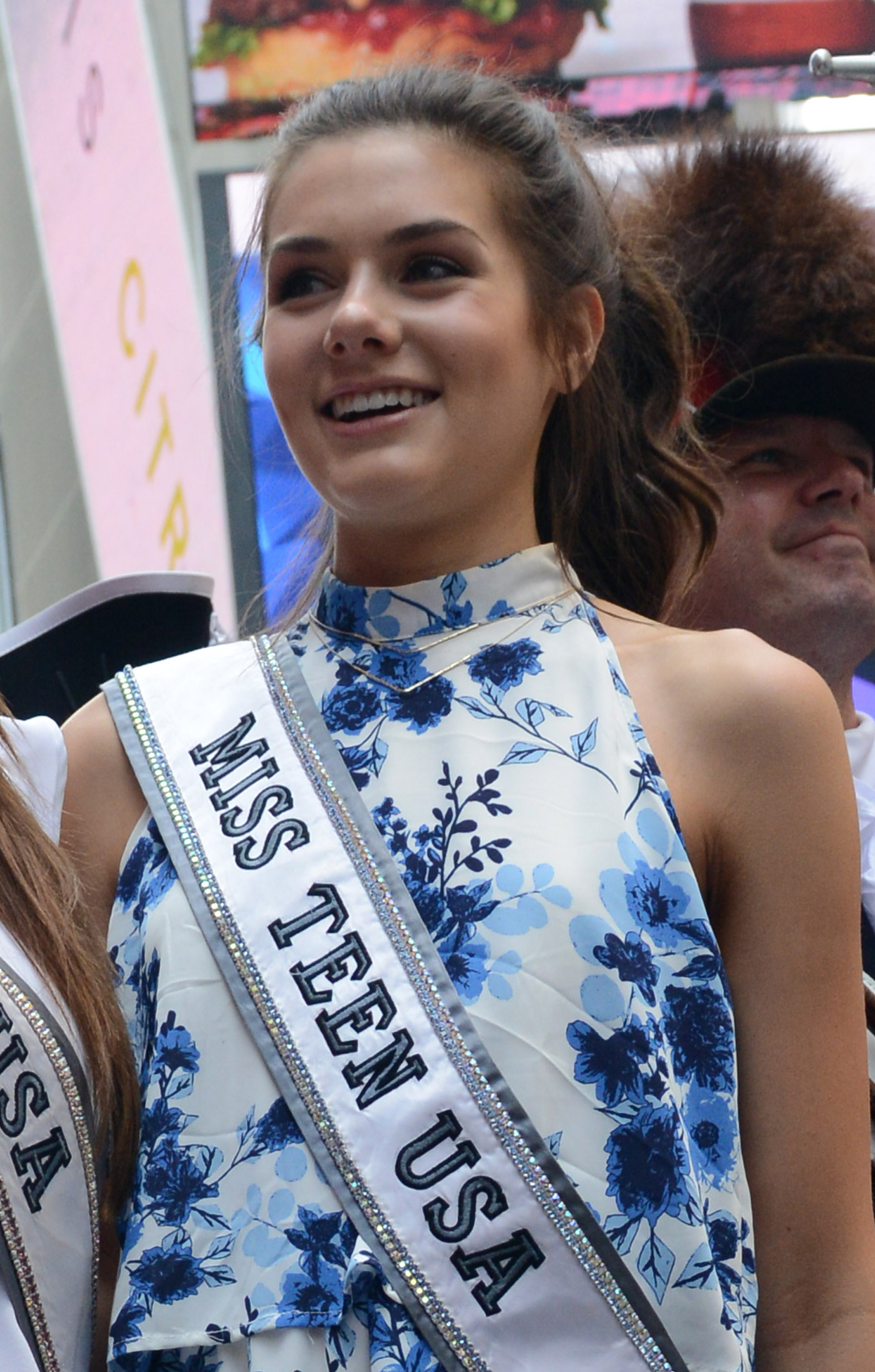
K. Lee Graham, Miss South Carolina Teen USA 2014 & Miss Teen USA 2014

== Results summary ==
=== Placements ===
- Miss Teen USAs: Vanessa Minnillo (1998), K. Lee Graham (2014)
- 1st runners-up: Brittany Pjetraj (2008), Tori Sizemore (2013), Kirby Elizabeth Self (2018)
- 2nd runner-up: Marley Stokes (2016)
- 3rd runner-up: Caitlin Upton (2007)
- Top 6: Mary Stevenson (1994)
- Top 12: Lauren Poppell (1993)
- Top 15/16/20: Lindsey Sporrer (2004), Brittany Smith (2006), Keyla Childs (2011), Shannon Ford (2012), Wesley Mitchell (2015), Allie Richardson (2019), Gracen Grainger (2020), Augusta Roach (2021), Kenlee McVay (2023), Isabella Brandt (2026)

South Carolina holds a record of 19 placements at Miss Teen USA.

=== Awards ===
- Miss Congeniality: Mary Stevenson (1994), Vanessa Minnillo (1998), Austen Brown (2002)

== Winners ==
Color key

- Declared as Winner
- Ended as runner-up
- Ended as one of the finalists or semifinalists

Year	Name	Hometown	Age^{1}	Local title	Placement at MTUSA	Special awards at MTUSA	Notes
2026	Isabella Brandt	Charleston	17	Miss Low Country Teen	Top 20		
2025	Leah Mary Scarmeas	Charleston	17	Miss Charleston AFB Teen			
2024	Jules Grass	Clemson	19	Miss Tigertown Teen			
2023	Kenlee McVay	Easley	19	Miss Clemson Teen	Top 20		
2022	Katie Ward	Charleston	19	Miss Yorktown Teen			
2021	Augusta Roach	Easley	17	Miss Clemson Teen	Top 16		
2020	Ava Gracen Grainger	Clemson	18	Miss Clemson Teen	Top 16		Previously Miss Teen World America 2017; Later Miss South Carolina USA 2024; Top 20 at Miss USA 2024; Placed in the Top 10 at Miss South Carolina 2025 as Miss Columbia
2019	Allie Richardson	Lexington	17	Miss Golden Corner Teen	Top 15		
2018	Kirby Elizabeth Self	Greenwood	17	Miss Upstate Teen	1st Runner-Up		Later Miss South Carolina USA 2023; Top 20 at Miss USA 2023
2017	Alexis Johnson	Myrtle Beach	17	Miss Mountain Lakes Teen			
2016	Marley D'Lynn Stokes	Lexington	18	Miss Golden Corner Teen	2nd runner-up		Later Miss South Carolina USA 2021; Top 8 at Miss USA 2021; Later Miss Supranational USA 2026
2015	Wesley McCall Mitchell	Lexington	17	Miss Central Lexington Teen	Top 15		
2014	Katherine (K.) Lee Graham	Chapin	16	Miss Lake Murray Teen	Miss Teen USA 2014		Daughter of Jennifer Neuen, Miss South Carolina Teen USA 1985
2013	Victoria "Tori" Carol Sizemore	Anderson	17	Miss Golden Corner Teen	1st runner-up		Later Miss South Carolina USA 2018; 4th runner-up at Miss South Carolina 2019 competition; 3rd runner-up at Miss South Carolina 2021
2012	Shannon Noel Ford	Lexington	18	Miss Lexington Teen	Top 16		
2011	Keyla Starr Childs	Summerville	17		Top 15		Later 3rd runner-up at Miss South Carolina USA 2014 and top 15 at Miss South Carolina USA 2017
2010	Megan Tyler Pinckney	North Charleston	18				Later Miss South Carolina USA 2013; 5th runner-up at Miss USA 2013
2009	Mary Helen Caver	North Augusta	18				
2008	Brittany Pjetraj	Chapin	18		1st runner-up		
2007	Lauren Caitlin Upton	Lexington	18		3rd runner-up		Contestant on The Amazing Race 16. Gained notoriety following her answer to the final question in the 2007 Miss Teen USA pageant, which was criticized as "strange" and "grammarless". Videos of her response were posted to YouTube and have received millions of views.
2006	Brittany Smith	Lyman	17		Top 15		
2005	Lauren Taylor	Travelers Rest	18				Later two time top 10 semifinalist at Miss South Carolina USA
2004	Lindsey Sporrer	Easley	17		Semi-finalist		
2003	Stephanie Horton	Sumter	18				
2002	Austen Brown	Charleston	17			Miss Congeniality	Later 4th runner-up at Miss South Carolina USA 2006; Later Mrs. America 2013
2001	Sarah Ashley Medley	North Charleston	15				Later Miss South Carolina USA 2005
2000	Morgan Smith	Lexington	17				
1999	Hannah Grooms	Wallace	17				Later 3x runner-up at Miss South Carolina USA
1998	Vanessa Joy Minnillo	Charleston	17		Miss Teen USA 1998	Miss Congeniality	Born in the Philippines. Later married actor and singer Nick Lachey
1997	Caroline Nicole Brigman	Latta	19				
1996	Wendy Roberts	Pelzer	19				
1995	Garianne Phillips	Leesville	18				
1994	Mary Stevenson	Greenville	18		Finalist	Miss Congeniality	Granddaughter of Miss Universe 1954, Miriam Stevenson (Miss South Carolina USA, Miss USA 1954)
1993	Lauren Poppell	Rock Hill	17		Semi-finalist		Later Miss South Carolina USA 1999; Finished 4th in Miss USA 1999
1992	Shannon Pelerin	Lexington	17				
1991	Jeanie Bowers	Prosperity	17				
1990	Kathryn Hancock	Greenwood	15				Later Mrs. North Carolina America 2007 under her married name, Kathryn Hancock-Stuart.
1989	Michelle Warner	Inman	15				
1988	Nicole Adams	West Columbia	16				
1987	Carol Lynn Carver	Hilton Head Island	16				
1986	Angela Christine Shuler	Rock Hill	15				Second runner-up at Miss South Carolina Teen USA 1983; Later Miss South Carolina USA 1989
1985	Jennifer Lynn Neuen	Florence	19				Later second runner-up at Miss South Carolina USA 1988 and 1989; Mother of Katherine Lee Graham, Miss Teen USA 2014
1984	Mary Catherine Delgado	Florence	17				
1983	Elizabeth "Beth" Woodard	Aiken	18				Later Miss South Carolina USA 1987

^{1} Age at the time of the Miss Teen USA pageant
