= Miss Wisconsin Teen USA =

Beauty pageant competition

- Formation: 1983
- Type: Beauty pageant
- Headquarters: West Des Moines
- Location: Iowa
- Members: Miss Teen USA
- Official language: English
- Website: Official Website

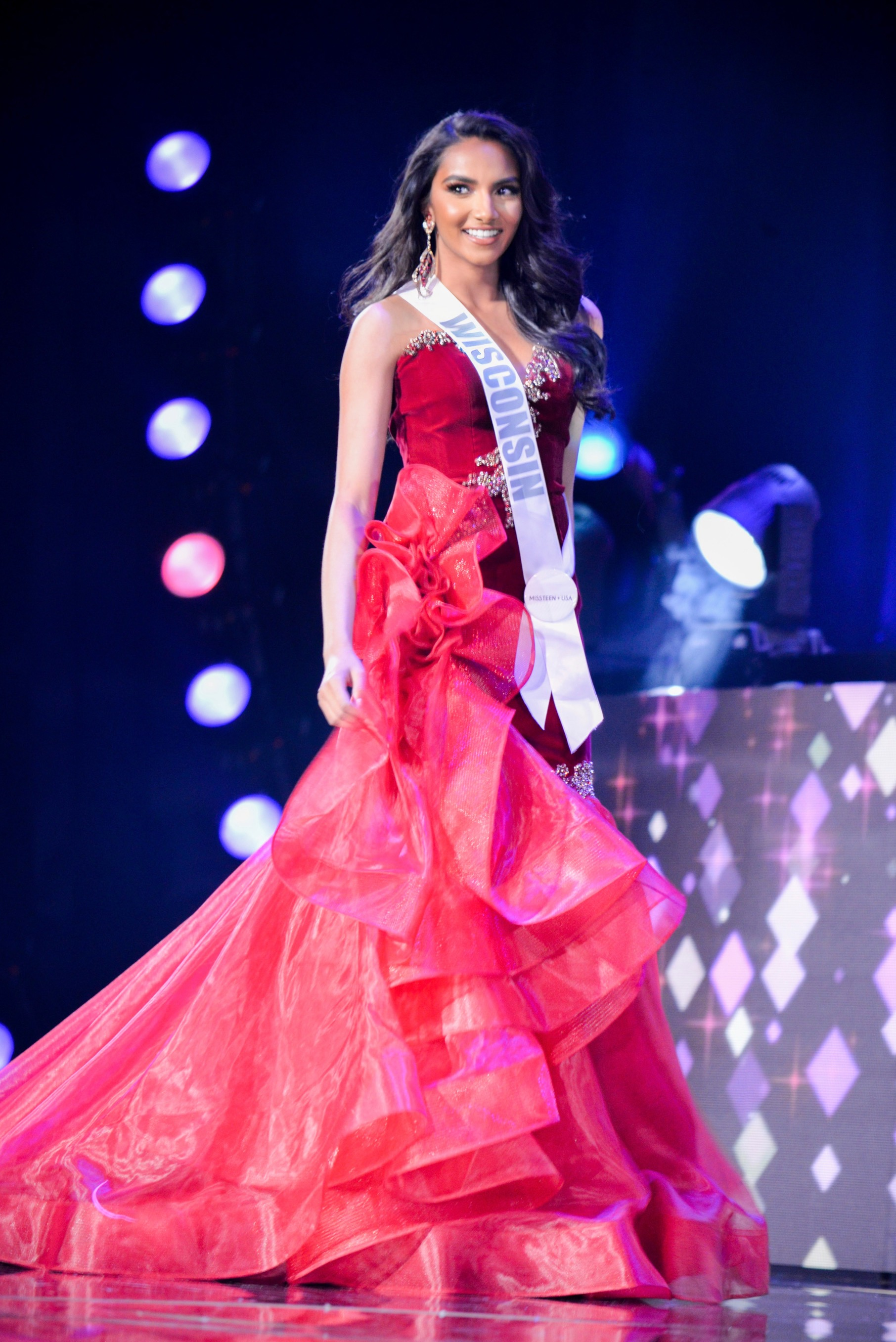
Sage Gundelly, Miss Wisconsin Teen USA 2022

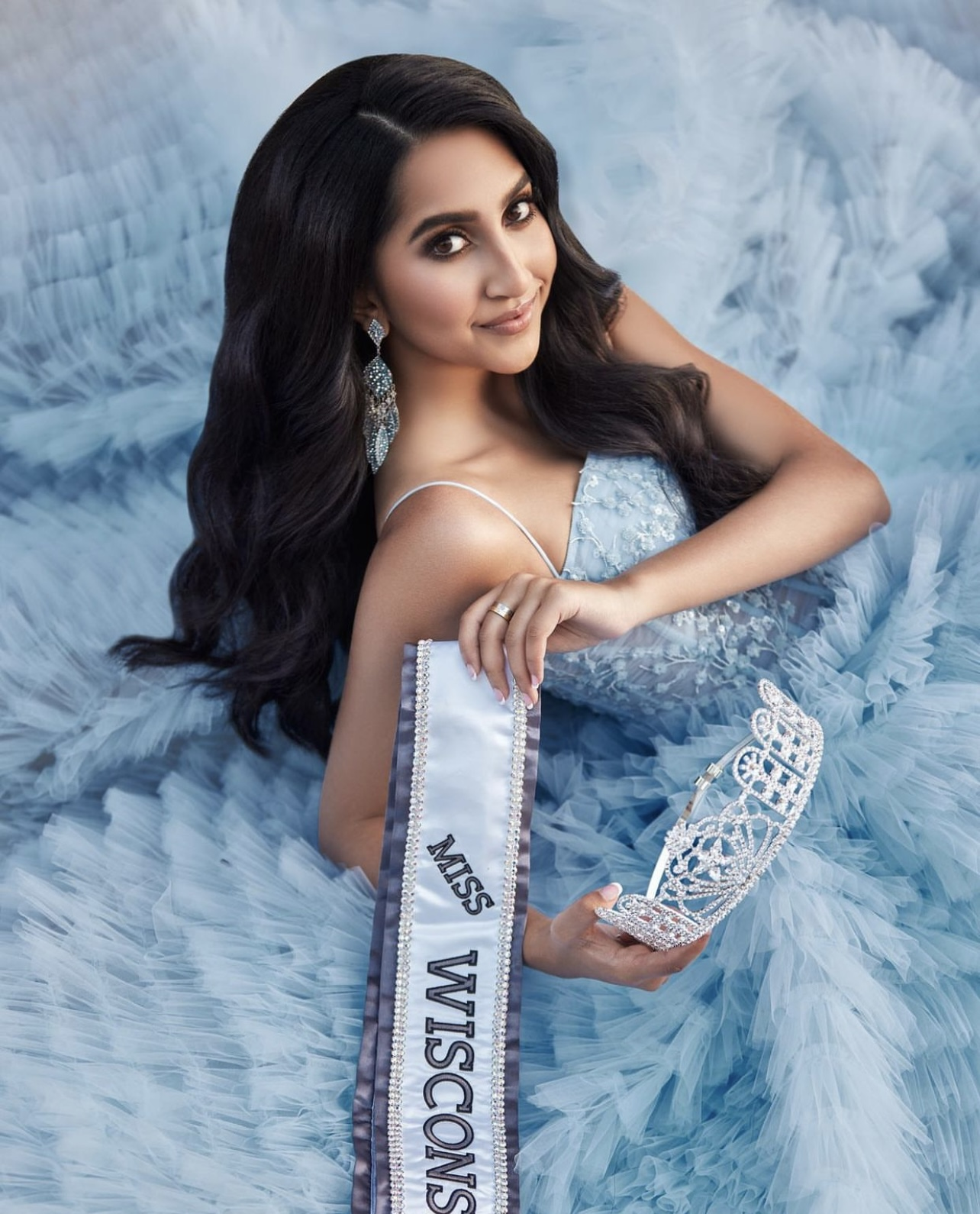
Shreya Gundelly, Miss Wisconsin Teen USA 2021

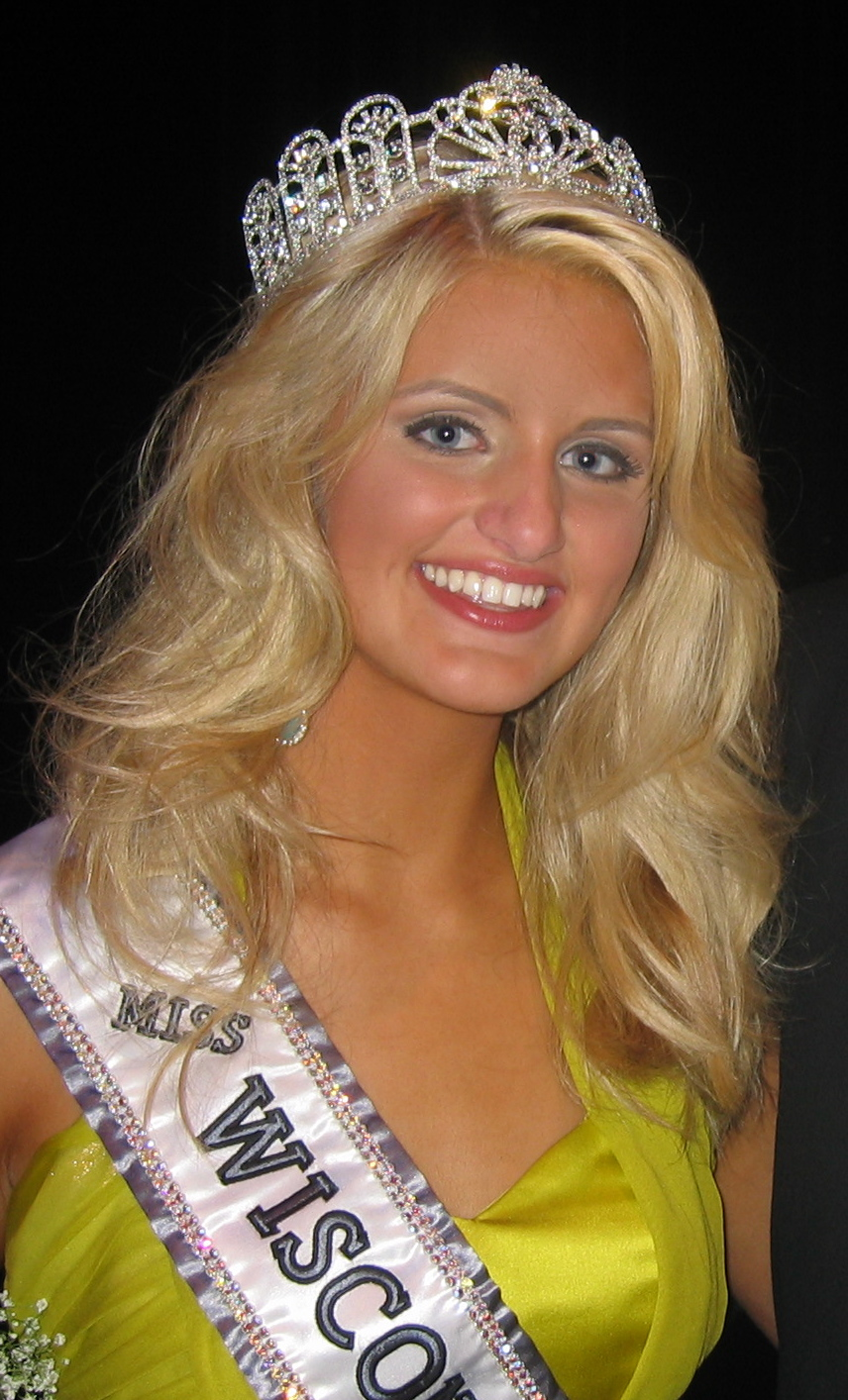
Kirsten Norderhaug, Miss Wisconsin Teen USA 2010

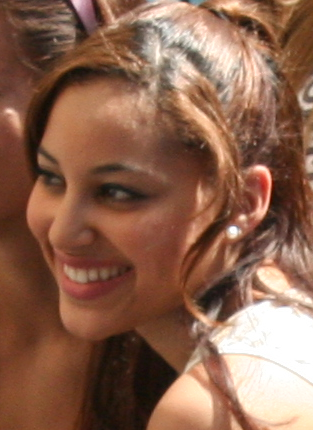
Shauna Angel Sabir, Miss Wisconsin Teen USA 2007

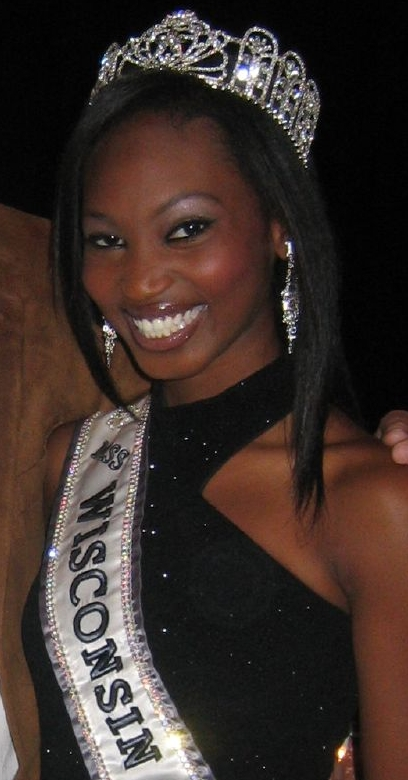
Bishara Dorre, Miss Wisconsin Teen USA 2006

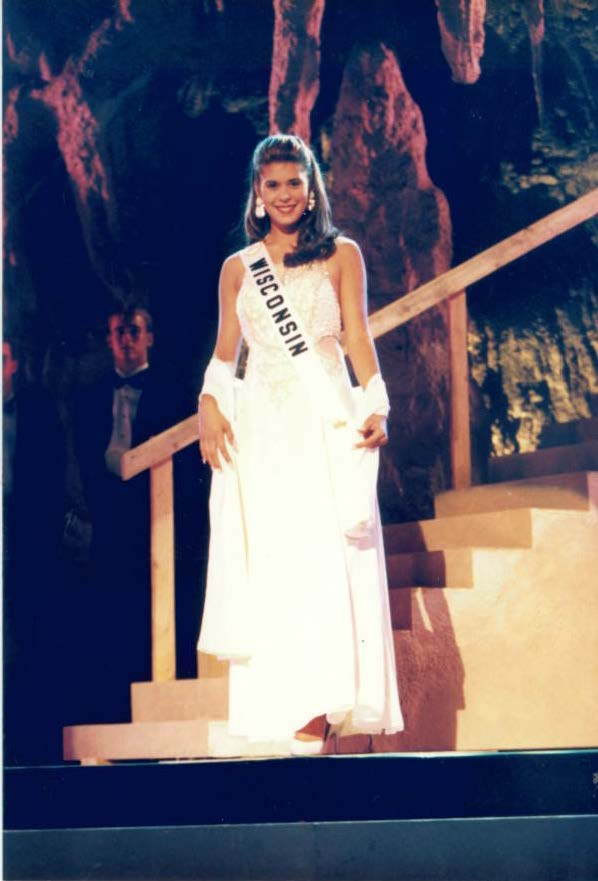
Nicole Lynn Werra, Miss Wisconsin Teen USA 1996

The Miss Wisconsin Teen USA competition is the pageant that selects the representative for the state of Wisconsin in the Miss Teen USA pageant.

It is produced by Future Productions based in Savage, Minnesota from 2007 until 2024 and from 2025 onwards is produced by KPC Productions based in West Des Moines, Iowa.

Wisconsin has placed at Miss Teen USA on seven occasions. The first placement was in 1984, when Adrianne Hazelwood made the ten semi-finalists, and then endured an eighteen-year dry spell until Vanessa Semrow won the Miss Teen USA crown in 2002. Then lastly with two consecutive semi-final placements with Katherine "Kate" Redeker (2013) and Patience Vallier (2014), followed by Shreya Gundelly in 2021 and her sister Sage in 2022. Shelby Hohneke was among the 20 quarter-semi-finalists in 2023 when the national pageant was held in Reno, Nevada.

Six Wisconsin teen titleholders have competed at Miss USA, (four as Miss Wisconsin-USA in 1995, 2010, 2014, 2016 and 2023, and one as Miss Connecticut USA in 1985). One teen, Maria Kim, has also competed at Miss America in 1987 and won two talent awards. In 2007, Bishara Abridasheed Dorre, Miss Wisconsin Teen-USA 2006, became the first former Miss Teen USA state titleholder to win a Miss America's Outstanding Teen state title, when she was crowned Miss Wisconsin's Outstanding Teen 2007.

After operating the Miss Wisconsin Teen-USA franchise along with the Miss Wisconsin-USA competition since 2008, Future Productions owners Craig Heitkamp and Denise Wallace (Miss Teen of America 1983), of Savage, Minnesota, announced on May 18, 2025 that they decided to end their "affiliation with the Miss USA Organization operated by VVV Global Entertainment, and its parent company, the Miss Universe Organization operated by JKN Global Group, effective immediately." Their press release continued to say "For over two decades we have worked diligently to provide women the opportunity to further their professional and educational endeavors and take part in top-notch, high caliber productions. We have worked hard to make sure our state titleholders are given the opportunity to form partnerships with charitable organizations. At this time, we do not feel we are operating under leadership that understands or prioritizes the business of the state-level franchises."

On June 23, 2025, KPC Productions owner Kelly McCoy of West Des Moines, Iowa was awarded the state franchises to operate Wisconsin, Iowa, Minnesota, North Dakota, and South Dakota for the 2025 competitions, which took place on August 8--10, 2025 at the Franklin Center in Des Moines, Iowa. It marked the first time in Miss Wisconsin-USA and Miss Wisconsin Teen-USA history that the Wisconsin competitions were held in a different state. Five entrants took part in the 2025 Miss Wisconsin Teen-USA competition, while five women participated in the 2025 Miss Wisconsin-USA program.

Leia Rios of Brookfield was crowned Miss Wisconsin Teen-USA 2026 on May 30, 2026, at The Franklin Center in Des Moines after besting three other teenagers for the state title. She will represent Wisconsin at Miss Teen USA 2026.

== Results summary ==
=== Placements ===
- Miss Teen USA: Vanessa Semrow (2002)
- Top 10: Adrianne Hazelwood (1984)
- Top 15: Patience Vallier (2014)
- Top 16: Katherine "Kate" Redeker (2013), Shreya Gundelly (2021), Sage Gundelly (2022)
- Top 20: Shelby Hohneke (2023), Autumn Gunderson (2025)

Wisconsin holds a record of 8 placements at Miss Teen-USA.

=== Awards ===
- People's Choice Award: Autumn Gunderson (2025)
- FLIXXE Ambassador Award: Leia Rios (2026)

== Winners ==
- Declared as Winner
- Ended as runner-up
- Ended as one of the finalists or semifinalists

Year	Name	Hometown	Age^{1}	Local title	Placement at Miss Teen USA	Special awards at Miss Teen USA	Notes
2026	Leia Rios	Brookfield	16	Miss Brookfield Teen		FLIXXE Ambassador Award	Won state title on first attempt and made history as the first Latina to hold the title for Wisconsin.
2025	Autumn Gunderson	DeForest	17	Miss DeForest Teen	Top 20	People's Choice Award	Won state title on fourth attempt.: Previously Miss Wisconsin High School America 2023 and USA National Miss Wisconsin Junior Teen 2022.
2024	Olivia Mae Negri	Park Falls	17	Miss Price County Teen			Won state title on third attempt
2023	Shelby Lynn Hohneke	Hudson	19	Miss Hudson Teen	Top 20		Won state title on fourth attempt
2022	Sage Gundelly	Mequon	15	Miss Milwaukee Teen	Top 16		Second East-Indian to win state teen title and the younger sister of Shreya Gundelly, Miss Wisconsin Teen USA 2021. They are the second set of sisters to win the state teen title, the others were Abigail and Elizabeth Bryson (2017 and 2009).
2021	Shreya Gundelly	Mequon	19	Miss Mequon Tenn	Top 16		First East-Indian to be selected as Miss Wisconsin Teen USA; Miss Wisconsin Jr. Teen at National American Miss 2017; and USA National Miss Wisconsin Teen 2018
2020	Olivia J. Lulich	Lyndon Station	17				Later Miss Wisconsin USA 2026
2019	Sydney Nicole Bobinski	Kronenewetter	17				
2018	Alexis Maria Loomans	Waunakee	16				Later Miss Wisconsin USA 2023; Second runner-up to Miss USA 2023.
2017	Abigail (Abby) Leigh Bryson	Brookfield	18				Sister of Elizabeth Bryson, Miss Wisconsin Teen USA 2009
2016	Karly Diana Knaus	Plymouth	17				
2015	April (Kenna) Mia Harke	Greenville	17				
2014	Patience Ann Vallier	Lake Mills	17		Top 15		
2013	Katherine (Kate) Patrice Redeker	Sheboygan	16		Top 16		Later Miss Wisconsin USA 2016
2012	Briana Joy Yamat	Oak Creek	15				
2011	Victoria Sorone Johnston	Eau Claire	19				Five-time Miss Wisconsin USA contestant and four-time entrant for Miss Minnesota USA
2010	Kirsten Jalbert Norderhaug	Brookfield	17				Daughter of Linda Faye Paulson, Miss North Dakota USA 1976
2009	Elizabeth Marie Bryson	Brookfield	17				Sister of Abigail Bryson, Miss Wisconsin Teen USA 2017
2008	Courtney Lynn Lopez	Oak Creek	18				Later Miss Wisconsin USA 2010
2007	Shauna Angel Sabir	Milwaukee	17				
2006	Bishara Dorre	Milwaukee	16				She was born Bishara Abridasheed Dorre.: Later Miss Wisconsin's Outstanding Teen 2007. First Miss Teen USA state delegate to win a Miss America's Outstanding Teen state title.; Top 10 at Miss America's Outstanding Teen 2008.; Later Miss Wisconsin USA 2014; Top 10 at Miss USA 2014.
2005	Anisa Yanti Phillips	Stevens Point	18				
2004	Myla Grace Dalbesio	Racine	17				
2003	Jenna Christine Tighe	Madison	17				
2002	Vanessa Semrow	Rhinelander	17		Miss Teen USA 2002		
2001	Kelly Ann Langford	Muskego	17				
2000	Erica Ellen Gustafson	Bristol	16				
1999	Deanndra Diane DeBlack	Monroe	16				
1998	Heidi Alderson Cody	Markesan	16				
1997	Allison Kathleen Schroeder	Elm Grove	16				
1996	Nicole Lynn Werra	South Milwaukee	16				
1995	Rebecca Louise Rowe	Prescott	17				
1994	Tara Ann Luellwitz Williams	Brookfield	15				
1993	Tanae Gabryelle Geisler	Hudson	17				Later Miss Wisconsin USA 1995
1992	Trina Ann Landowski	Stevens Point	16				
1991	Pamela Ann Schroeder	Glendale	16				
1990	Deborah Ann Santacroce	Glendale	15				
1989	Shannon Michelle Redman	Hayward	18				
1988	Jennifer Ann Schwalenberg	Kaukauna	19				
1987	Barbara Faye Nelson	Oshkosh	17				
1986	Lanae Elizabeth St.John	La Crosse	17				
1985	Maria Kim	Shorewood	17				Later Miss Wisconsin 1987
1984	Adrianne Hazelwood	Glendale	16		Top 10	Miss Photogenic	Later Miss Connecticut USA 1985 and first Miss Teen USA state titleholder to win a Miss USA state title.
1983	Jane Elizabeth Zawada	Niagara	17				

^{1} Age at the time of the Miss Teen USA pageant
