= Katie Blair =

American beauty pageant titleholder

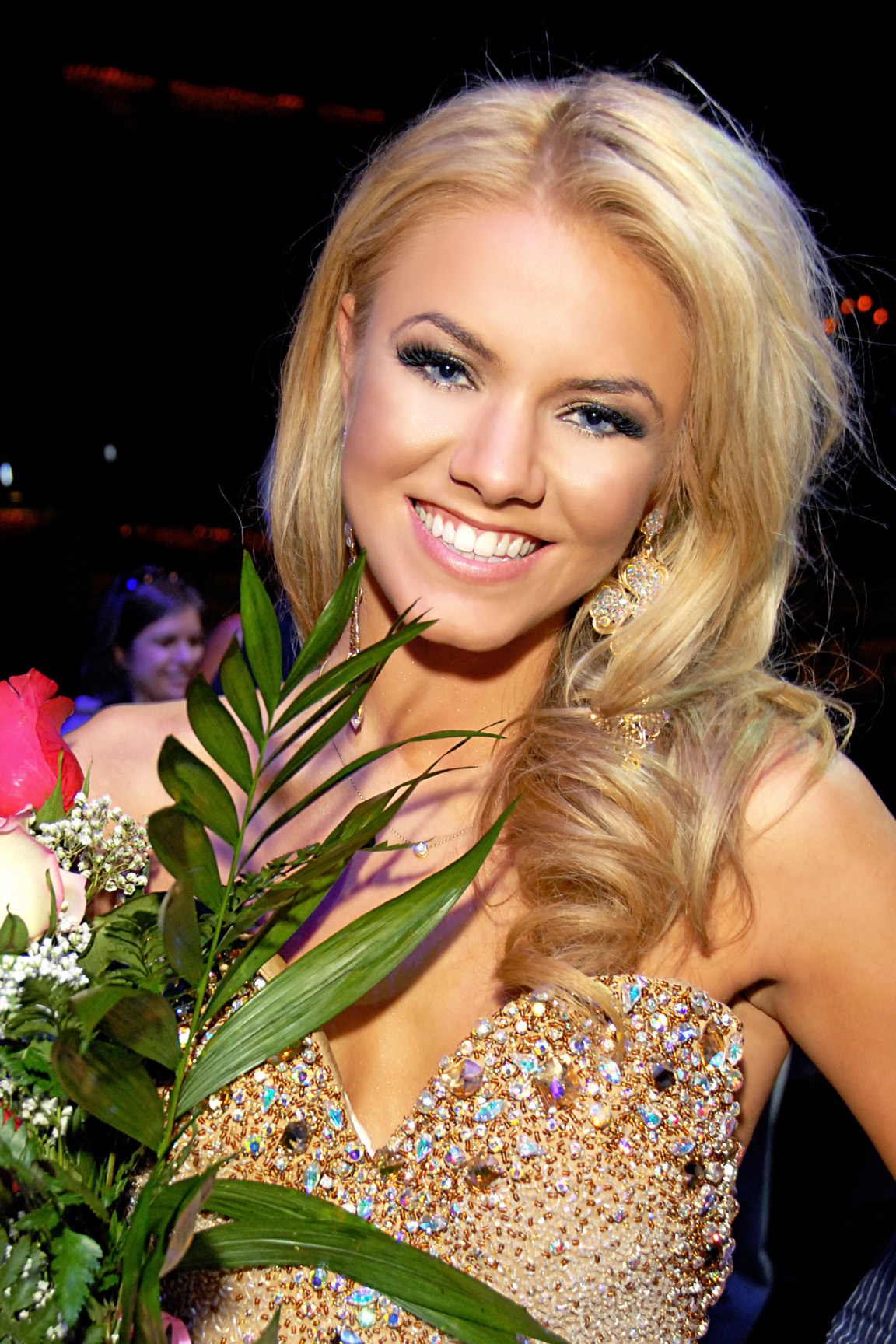
- Blair in 2011
- Born: Katherine Amanda Blair; Billings, Montana, U.S.
- Height: 1.65 m (5 ft 5 in)
- Beauty pageant titleholder
- Title: Miss Montana Teen USA 2006; Miss Teen USA 2006; Miss California USA 2011
- Hair color: Blonde
- Eye color: Blue
- Major competitions: Miss Montana Teen USA 2006 (Winner); Miss Teen USA 2006 (Winner); Miss California USA 2011 (1st Runner-up/Winner)

Katie Blair is an American beauty pageant titleholder who won Miss Teen USA 2006, becoming the first person from the state of Montana to win a major pageant title. At Miss California USA 2011 Blair was originally the first runner-up, but after the winner Alyssa Campanella won Miss USA 2011, she received the title on June 25.

== Pageantry ==
=== Miss Teen USA 2006 ===
Blair represented Montana at Miss Teen USA 2006 in Palm Springs, California on August 15, 2006, and became the first Montanan to win the pageant. She was crowned by outgoing titleholder, Miss Ohio Teen USA Allie LaForce. Melissa Lingafelt of North Carolina was first runner-up.

Houston designer Gaspar Cruz styled Blair's evening gown, hair and makeup. Previously Cruz designed gowns for Gina Giacinto, Miss Nevada USA 2001, who was top five at Miss USA, and for Shauna Gambill, Miss California USA 1998, who was first runner-up at Miss USA.

Blair's Miss Teen USA prize included a one-year modeling contract with Trump Model Management and a scholarship to The School for Film and Television in New York City, as well as a guest appearance in the NBC soap opera Passions.

On August 24, 2007, Blair passed down the Miss Teen USA title to Hilary Cruz of Colorado.

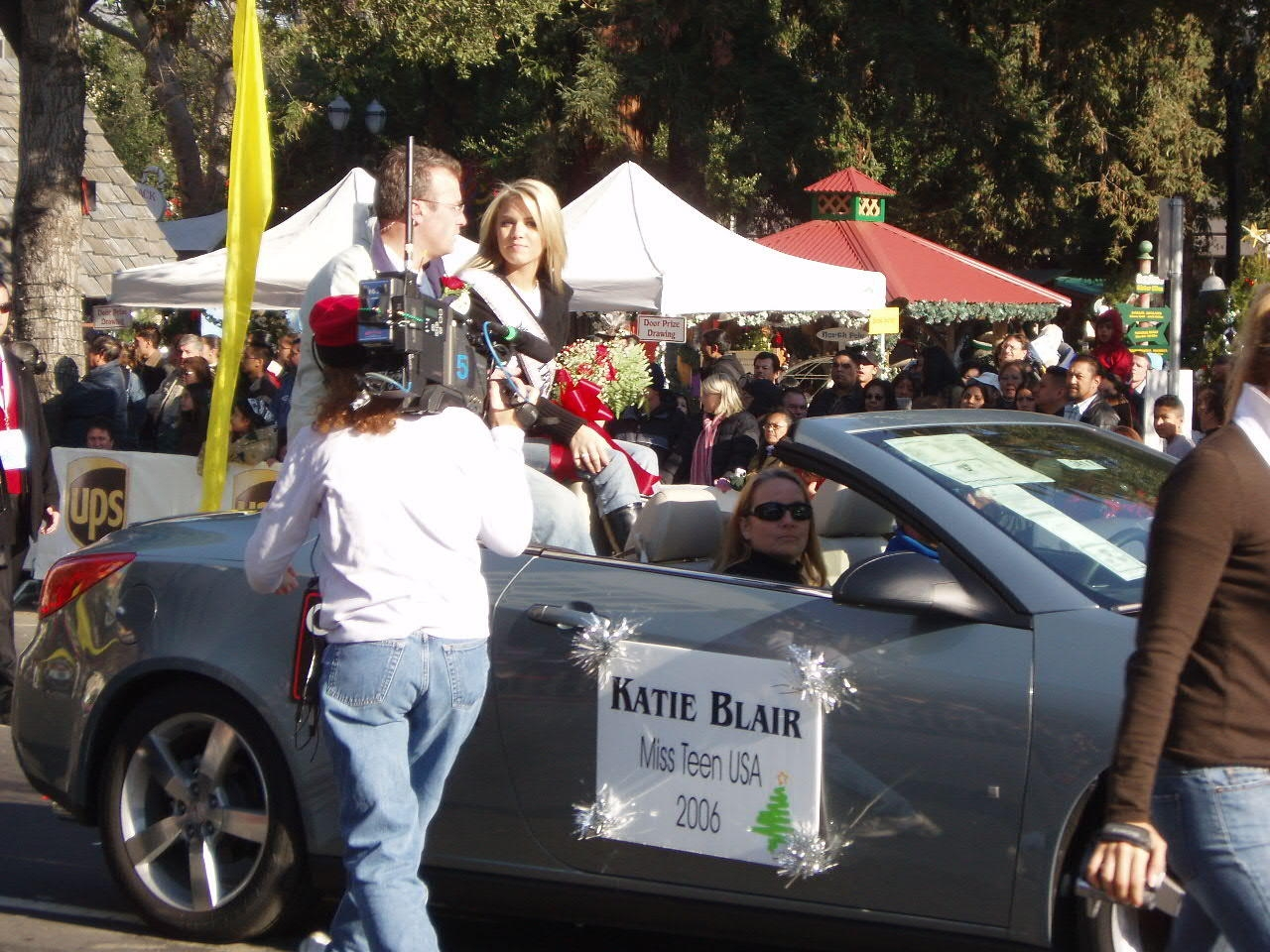
Blair is interviewed during the San Jose Holiday Parade

Blair spent her year as a titleholder in New York City, living in a Trump Place apartment with Miss Universe and Miss USA 2006, Tara Conner. During this time, Blair raised money for charity.

Following her win, Blair gave interviews with various media organizations, including WPIX New York and Dayside on Fox News. In September 2006, she returned to Billings, Montana for her official homecoming as Miss Teen USA. The city council announced the day as "Katie Blair Day" and awarded her a key to the city. She crowned Chelsea Nelson, also of Billings, as the next Miss Montana Teen USA 2007.

==== Controversy ====
Blair allegedly drank while underage during her reign. On December 20, 2006, Mothers Against Drunk Driving announced that because of Blair's alleged activities, it would no longer use her as a spokesperson against underage drinking.

=== Miss California USA 2011 ===
Blair was first runner-up at Miss California USA 2011. The winner was Alyssa Campanella, who also was Miss New Jersey Teen USA 2007.

== Early life ==
Blair lived in Sugar Land, Texas, and attended grades 9-11 at Stephen F. Austin High School. She graduated from Billings West High School in 2006, and planned to attend Louisiana State University but postponed that for her reign.

Awards and achievements
Preceded by Kendall Powell	Miss Montana Teen USA; 2006	Succeeded by Chelsea Nelson
Preceded by Allie LaForce, Ohio	Miss Teen USA; 2006	Succeeded by Hilary Cruz, Colorado
Preceded by Alyssa Campanella	Miss California USA; 2011 (assumed)	Succeeded by Natalie Pack
