= Miss Teen USA 2007 =

25th edition of the Miss Teen USA competition

- Date: August 24, 2007
- Presenters: Mario Lopez
- Entertainment: Jonas Brothers
- Venue: Pasadena Civic Auditorium, Pasadena, California
- Broadcaster: NBC; KNBC
- Entrants: 51
- Placements: 15
- Winner: Hilary Cruz; Colorado
- Congeniality: Anne Elise Parks; Mississippi
- Photogenic: Allison Farrow; Maryland

Miss Teen USA 2007, the 25th Miss Teen USA pageant, was held on August 24, 2007 in Pasadena, California. At the conclusion of the final night of the competition Hilary Cruz of Colorado was crowned Miss Teen USA 2007 by outgoing titleholder Katie Blair of Montana.

The event was hosted by Mario Lopez, who also hosted Miss Teen USA 1998 and Miss Teen USA 2003. In 2007 he also hosted the Miss America and Miss Universe pageants. The pageant was broadcast on NBC at 8:00 p.m. EST, rather than at 9:00 p.m. EST.

For several years, was the final Miss Teen USA pageant to be televised on broadcast television due to NBC failing to renew its contract. It returned to television in 2024, broadcast on The CW.

== Results ==
=== Placements ===
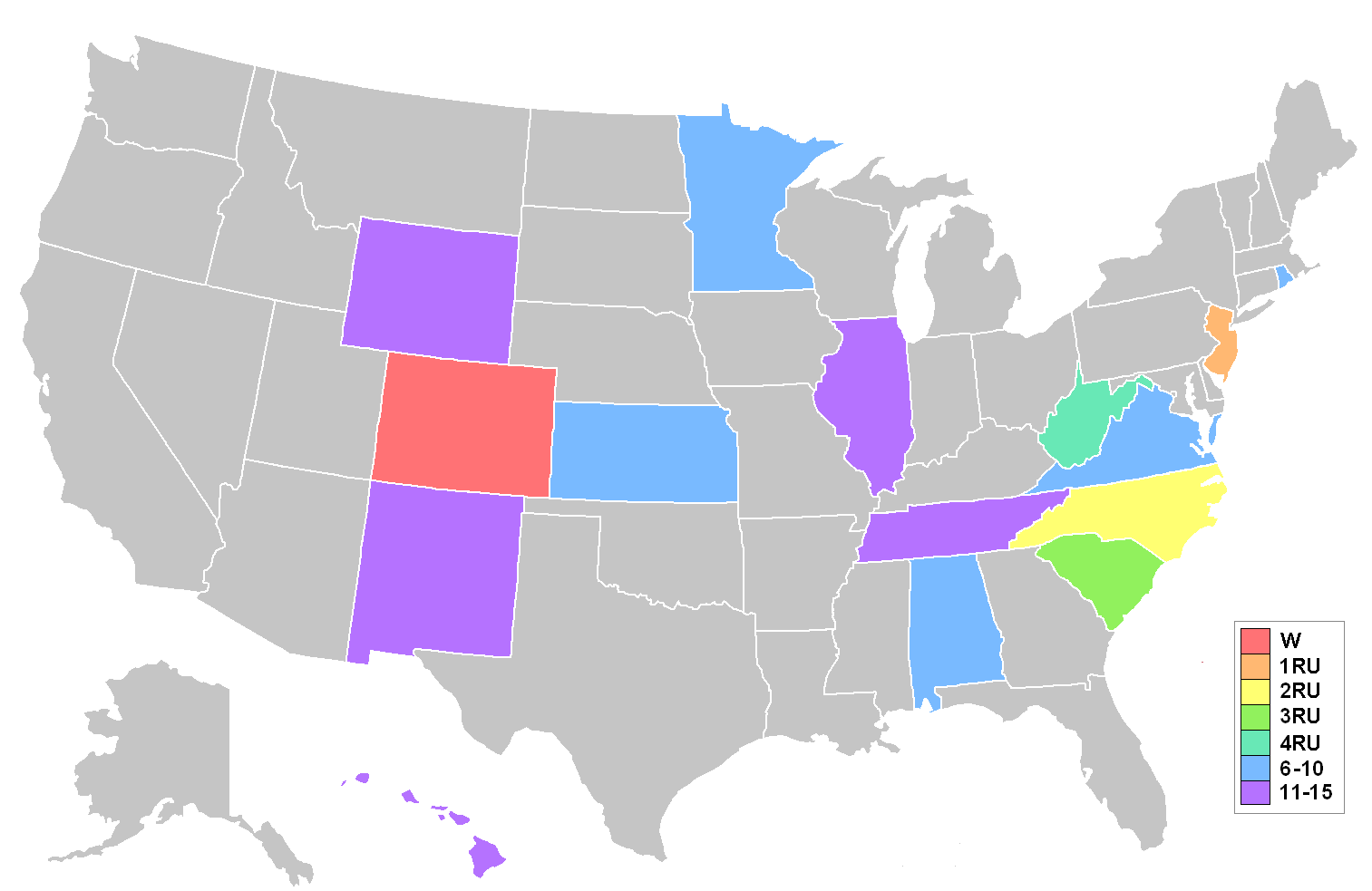
Map showing placements by state

Final results	Contestant
Miss Teen USA 2007	Colorado – Hilary Cruz
1st Runner-Up	New Jersey – Alyssa Campanella
2nd Runner-Up	North Carolina – Katie Coble
3rd Runner-Up	South Carolina – Caitlin Upton
4th Runner-Up	West Virginia – Chelsea Welch
Top 10	Alabama – Canden Jackson; Kansas – Jaymie Stokes; Minnesota – Vanessa VonBehren; Rhode Island – Rochelle Rose; Virginia – Emily Bruce
Top 15	Hawaii – Serena Karnagy; Illinois – Victoria Davis; New Mexico – Elizabeth Kranz; Tennessee – Macy Erwin; Wyoming – Mollie Smith

== Historical significance ==
- Colorado wins the competition for the first time, also becoming the 23rd state who wins Miss Teen USA.
- New Jersey earns the 1st runner-up position for the first time.
- North Carolina earns the 2nd runner-up position for the first time.
- South Carolina earns the 3rd runner-up position for the first time.
- West Virginia earns the 4th runner-up position for the first time.
- States that placed in semifinals the previous year were Kansas, New Jersey, North Carolina, Rhode Island, South Carolina, and Virginia.
- Kansas and Virginia placed for the third consecutive year.
- New Jersey, North Carolina, Rhode Island, and South Carolina made their second consecutive placement.
- Illinois, Minnesota, New Mexico, and West Virginia last placed in 2005.
- Alabama, Hawaii, and Tennessee last placed in 2004.
- Colorado and Wyoming last placed in 1998.
- Michigan and Oklahoma break an ongoing streak of placements since 2005.
- Georgia and Maryland break an ongoing streak of placements since 2004.

== Events ==
Contestants arrived in Pasadena on August 12 and participated in a number of events in the lead up to the final competition. On August 14 the official swimsuit poster shoot was held by the pool of the Pasadena Hilton, the host hotel.

== Competition rounds ==
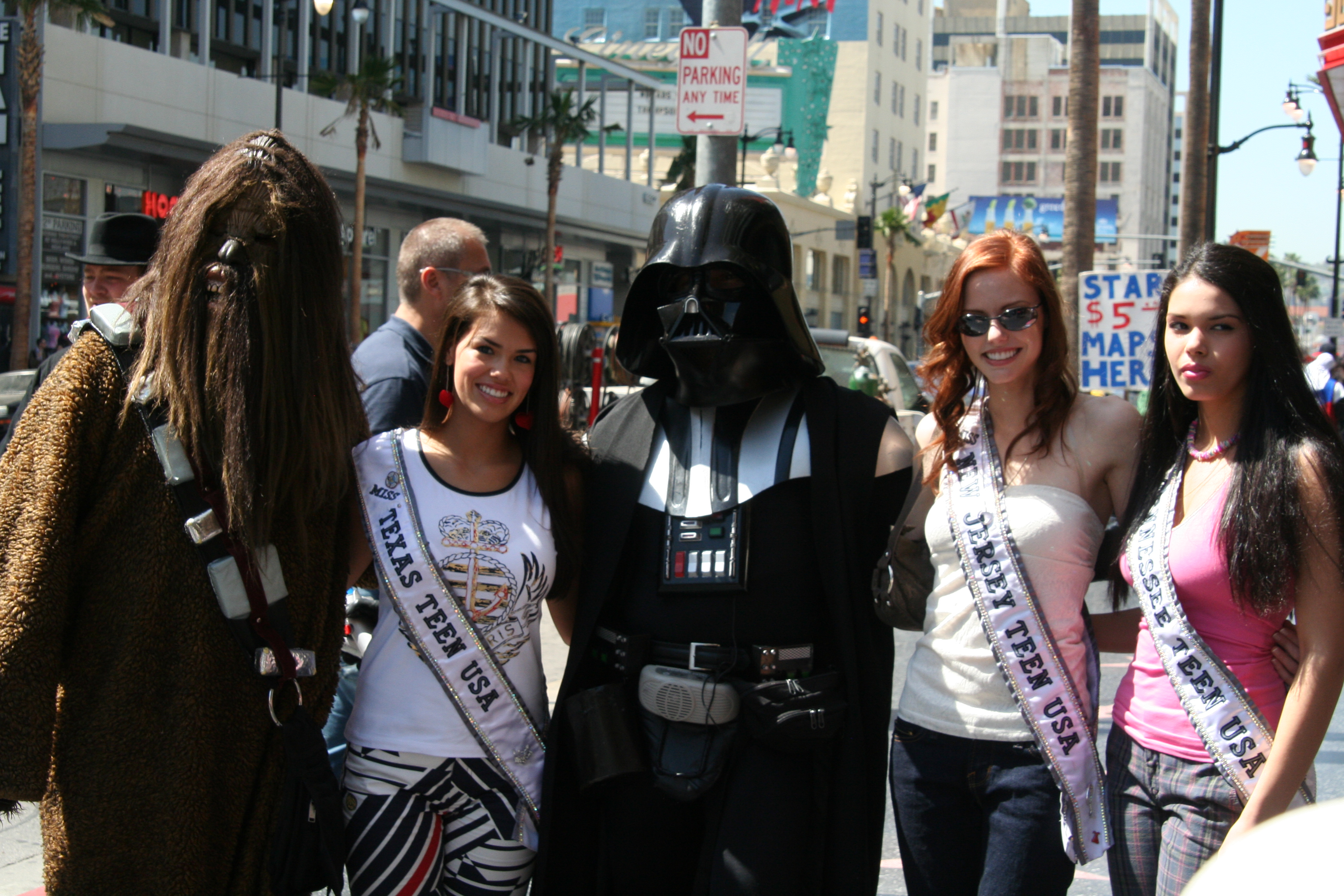
Miss Teen USA delegates in Hollywood, March 2007

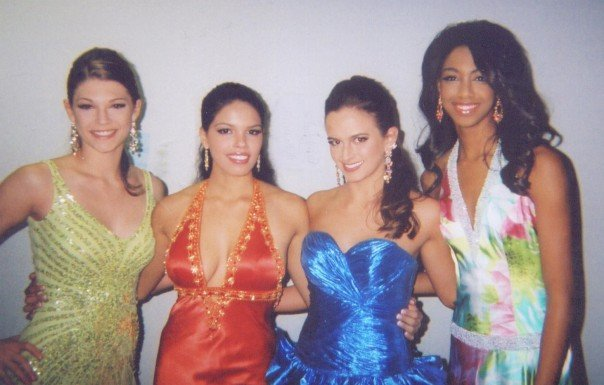
Chelsea Welch (West Virginia), Macy Erwin (Tennessee), Jena Sims (Georgia) and Paige Hill (Oklahoma)

=== Finals ===
The top fifteen was announced during the final telecast and went on to compete in the swimsuit competition, which featured music by Kat DeLuna. Following this the top ten delegates were announced and they competed in evening gowns, to music by the Jonas Brothers. After this, the two special award winners were announced, followed by the announcement of the top five delegates. The interview competition involved the top five answering a question proposed by one of the judges. Each delegate had 30 seconds to answer. Afterwards the judges had one final look at the top five as they cast their votes for the winner and runners-up. Katie Blair then took her final walk and the runners-up and winner was announced.

During the Final Question round, Aimee Teegarden asked Miss South Carolina, Caitlin Upton, why she thought a fifth of Americans are unable to locate the United States on a world map. Upton's response was:

I personally believe that, U.S. Americans are unable to do so, because some… people out there in our nation that don't have maps, and I believe that our education, like such as in South Africa and the Iraq, everywhere like such as, and I believe that they should… our education over here in the U.S., should help the U.S., er, should help South Africa and should help the Iraq and the Asian countries so we will be able to build up our future. For our children.

The following Tuesday, August 28, Upton appeared on NBC's Today Show, where Ann Curry gave her the opportunity to formulate a new response to the same question. Upton's new reply was: "Personally, my friends and I, we know exactly where the United States is on our map. I don't know anyone else who doesn't. If the statistics are correct, I believe there should be more emphasis on geography in our education so people will learn how to read maps better." She said that she was "in shock" during the competition and barely heard the question that had been asked.

== Delegates ==
The Miss Teen USA 2007 delegates were:

State	Contestant	Hometown	Age (Note: Ages at the time of the pageant)	Height	Placement	Awards	Notes
Alabama	Canden Jackson	Fairhope	17	5 ft 10 in 178 cm	Top 10		
Alaska	Muriel Clauson	Anchorage	17	5 ft 9 in 175 cm			
Arizona	Tiffany Martin	Phoenix	18	5 ft 7 in 170 cm			
Arkansas	Tiffany Greenstreet	Melbourne	18	5 ft 4 in 163 cm			
California	Kylee Lin	San Rafael	16	5 ft 6 in 168 cm			
Colorado	Hilary Cruz	Louisville	18	5 ft 7 in 170 cm	Miss Teen USA 2007		
Connecticut	Olga Litvinenko	Greenwich	17	5 ft 9 in 175 cm			Later Miss Connecticut USA 2017
Delaware	Holly Shively	Newark	16	5 ft 4 in 163 cm			
District of Columbia	Jasmine Alexis	Washington, D.C.	16	5 ft 5 in 165 cm			Later Miss District of Columbia's Outstanding Teen 2008 and Top 10 at Miss America's Outstanding Teen 2009
Florida	Annilie Hastey	Miami	18	5 ft 8 in 173 cm			
Georgia	Jena Sims	Winder	18	5 ft 8 in 173 cm			
Hawaii	Serena Karnagy	Honolulu	16	5 ft 5 in 165 cm	Top 15		Later competed at Miss International 2008 as Hawaii's representative.
Idaho	Krista McNeal	Sandpoint	18	5 ft 8 in 173 cm			
Illinois	Victoria Davis	Thawville	18	5 ft 8 in 173 cm	Top 15		
Indiana	Victoria Tomlinson	Anderson	19	5 ft 7 in 170 cm			
Iowa	Dakota Crosswhite	Cedar Rapids	18	5 ft 5 in 165 cm			
Kansas	Jaymie Stokes	Lenexa	16	5 ft 11 in 180 cm	Top 10		Later Miss Kansas USA 2011
Kentucky	Katrina Giannini	Princeton	17	5 ft 8 in 173 cm			
Louisiana	Logan Travis	Amite City	15	5 ft 7 in 170 cm			
Maine	Amanda Pelletier	Vassalboro	18	5 ft 3 in 160 cm			
Maryland	Allison Farrow	Earleville	18	5 ft 6 in 168 cm		Miss Photogenic	
Massachusetts	Kathleen McNiff	Groton	17	5 ft 8 in 173 cm			
Michigan	Caitlin Klug	Eau Claire	18	5 ft 4 in 163 cm			
Minnesota	Vanessa Vonbehren	Apple Valley	17	5 ft 7 in 170 cm	Top 10		
Mississippi	Anne Elise Parks	New Albany	18	5 ft 9 in 175 cm		Miss Congeniality	
Missouri	Lauren Peterson	Farmington	16	5 ft 10 in 178 cm			Later top 20 at Miss Grand International 2015
Montana	Chelsea Nelson	Billings	17	5 ft 9 in 175 cm			
Nebraska	Lauren Clabaugh	Omaha	16	5 ft 7 in 170 cm			
Nevada	Danielle Hashimoto	Reno	16	5 ft 4 in 163 cm			
New Hampshire	Alexandra MacDonald	Gilford	18	5 ft 3 in 160 cm			
New Jersey	Alyssa Campanella	Manalapan	17	5 ft 8 in 173 cm	1st runner-up		Later Miss California USA 2011 and Miss USA 2011
New Mexico	Liz Kranz	Deming	17	5 ft 8 in 173 cm	Top 15		
New York	Tatiana Pallagi	Avon	17	5 ft 7 in 170 cm			
North Carolina	Katie Coble	Charlotte	17	5 ft 7 in 170 cm	2nd runner-up		Later Miss North Carolina USA 2017
North Dakota	Taylor Kearns	Fargo	18	5 ft 7 in 170 cm			Later Miss North Dakota USA 2010
Ohio	Rachel Epperly	Gahanna	18	5 ft 6 in 168 cm			
Oklahoma	Paige Hill	Oklahoma City	16	6 ft 0 in 183 cm			
Oregon	Whitney Whitehouse	Bend	17	5 ft 6 in 168 cm			
Pennsylvania	Kelsie Sinagra	Pittsburgh	17	5 ft 5 in 165 cm			
Rhode Island	Rochelle Rose	Jamestown	15	5 ft 7 in 170 cm	Top 10		
South Carolina	Caitlin Upton	Lexington	18	5 ft 9 in 175 cm	3rd runner-up		Gained notoriety following her answer to the final question, which was criticized as "strange" and "grammarless". Videos of her response were posted to YouTube and have received millions of views. Placed third with her then-boyfriend Brent Horne on The Amazing Race 16.
South Dakota	Kari Schull	Watertown	17	5 ft 9 in 175 cm			
Tennessee	Macy Erwin	Chattanooga	17	5 ft 7 in 170 cm	Top 15		
Texas	Sommer Isdale	Harker Heights	16	5 ft 8 in 173 cm			
Utah	Kelsey Brigel	Draper	17	5 ft 7 in 170 cm			
Vermont	Olivia Hubbard	Rutland	17	5 ft 6 in 168 cm			
Virginia	Emily Bruce	Lynchburg	17	5 ft 9 in 175 cm	Top 10		
Washington	Shalane Larango	Vancouver	18	5 ft 9 in 175 cm			Previously Miss Washington's Outstanding Teen 2005, 2nd runner-up at Miss America's Outstanding Teen 2006
West Virginia	Chelsea Welch	West Union	16	5 ft 9 in 175 cm	4th runner-up		Later Miss West Virginia USA 2013 and Top 15 at Miss USA 2013
Wisconsin	Shauna Sabir	Milwaukee	17	5 ft 5 in 165 cm			
Wyoming	Mollie Smith	Casper	17	5 ft 8 in 173 cm	Top 15		

=== Contestant gallery ===
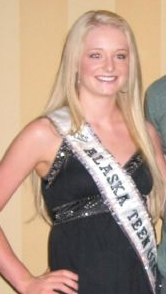
Muriel Clauson, Miss Alaska Teen USA 2007

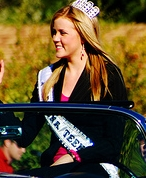
Tiffany Martin, Miss Arizona Teen USA 2007

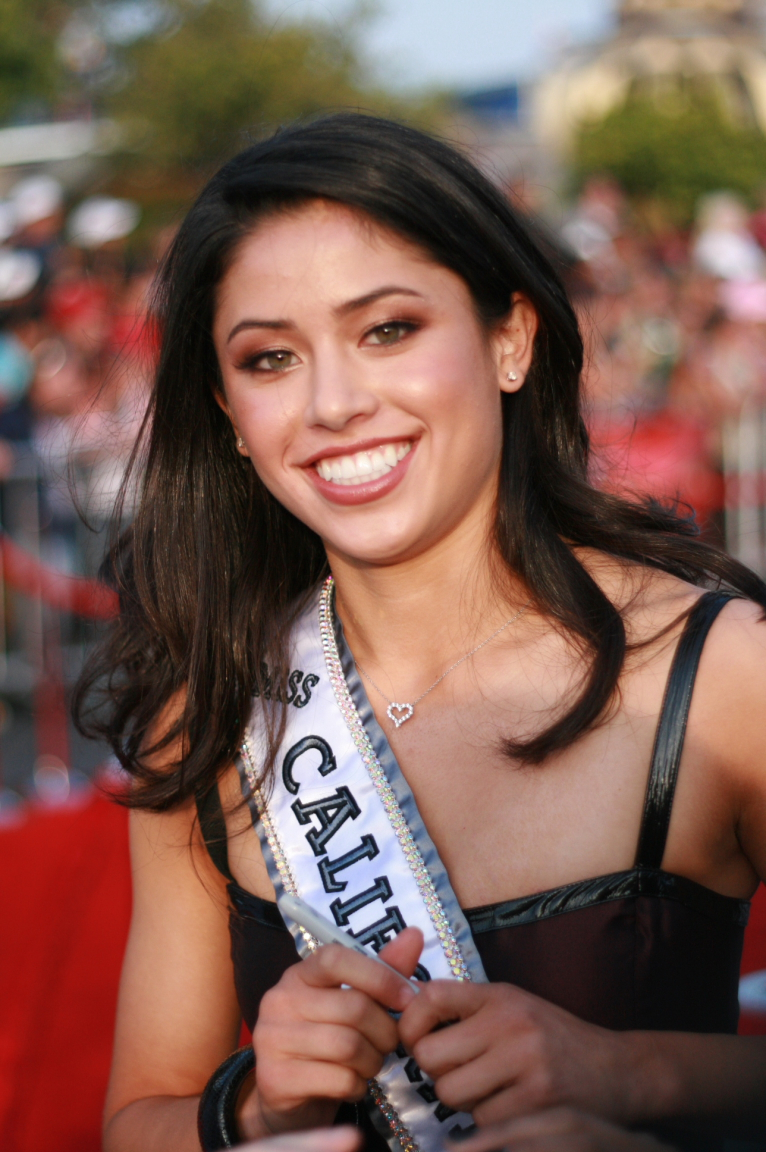
Kylee Lin, Miss California Teen USA 2007

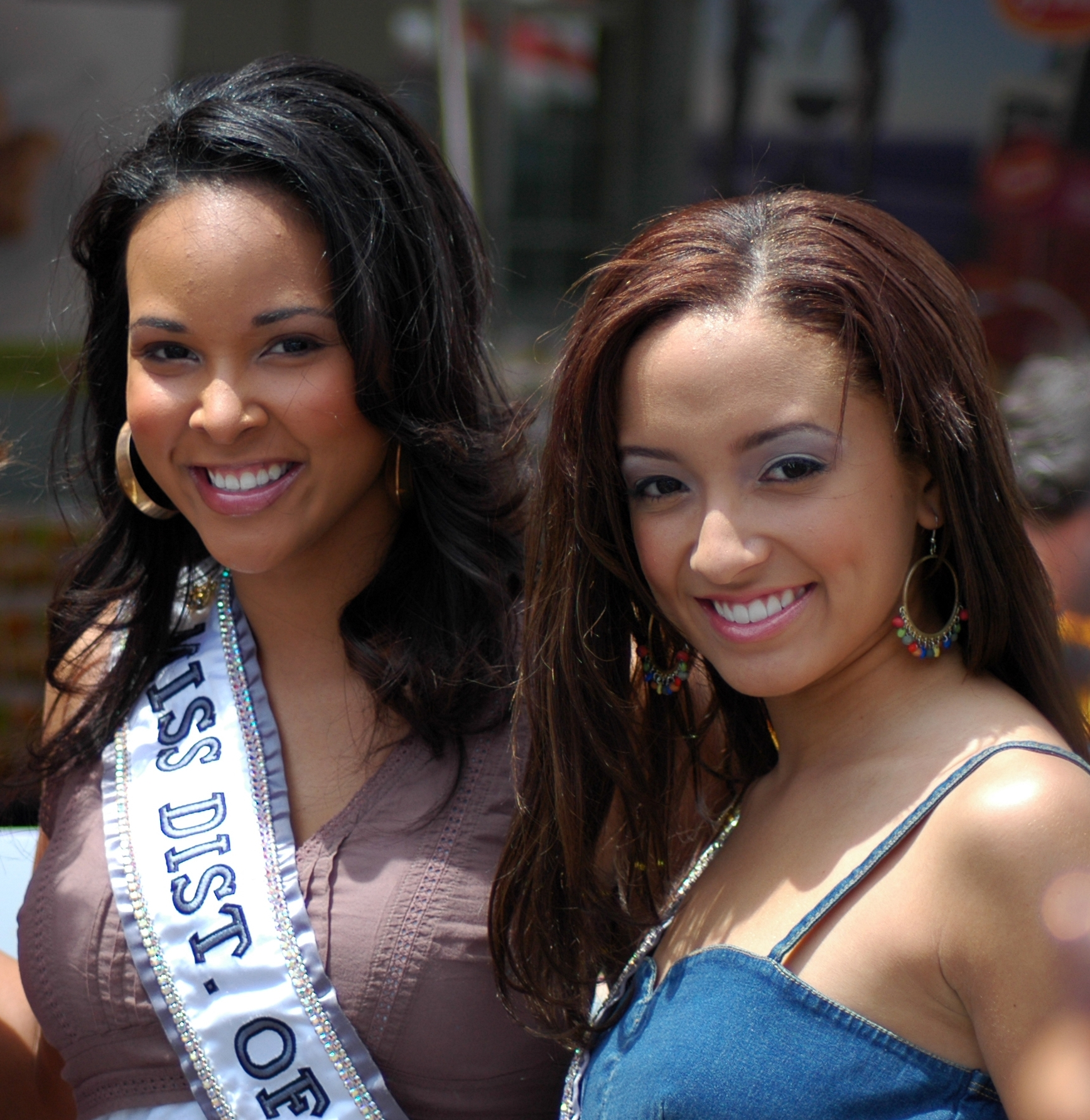
Jasmine Alexis (right), Miss District of Columbia Teen USA 2007

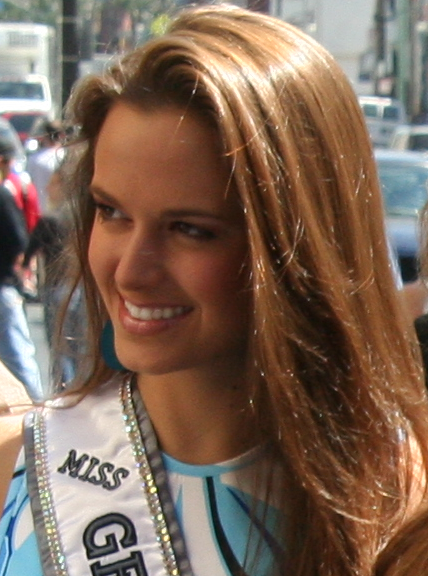
Jena Sims, Miss Georgia Teen USA 2007

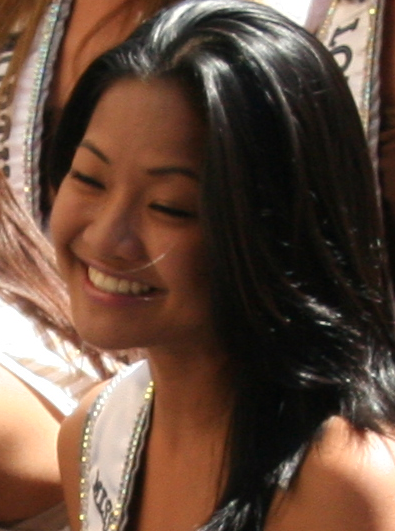
Serena Karnagy, Miss Hawaii Teen USA 2007

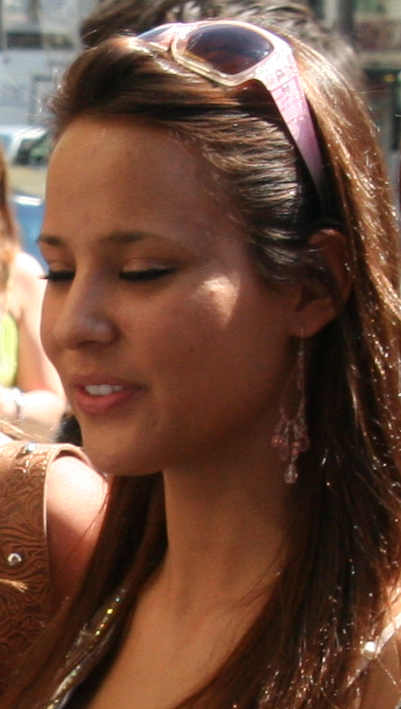
Dakota Crosswhite, Miss Iowa Teen USA 2007

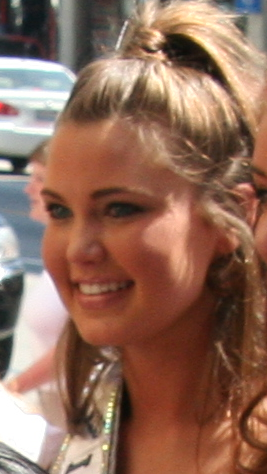
Logan Travis, Miss Louisiana Teen USA 2007

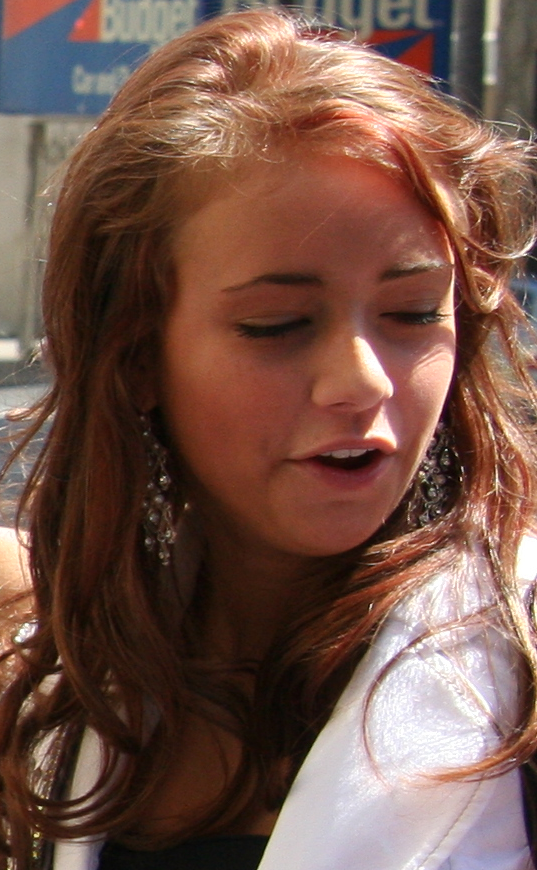
Vanessa Vonbehren, Miss Minnesota Teen USA 2007

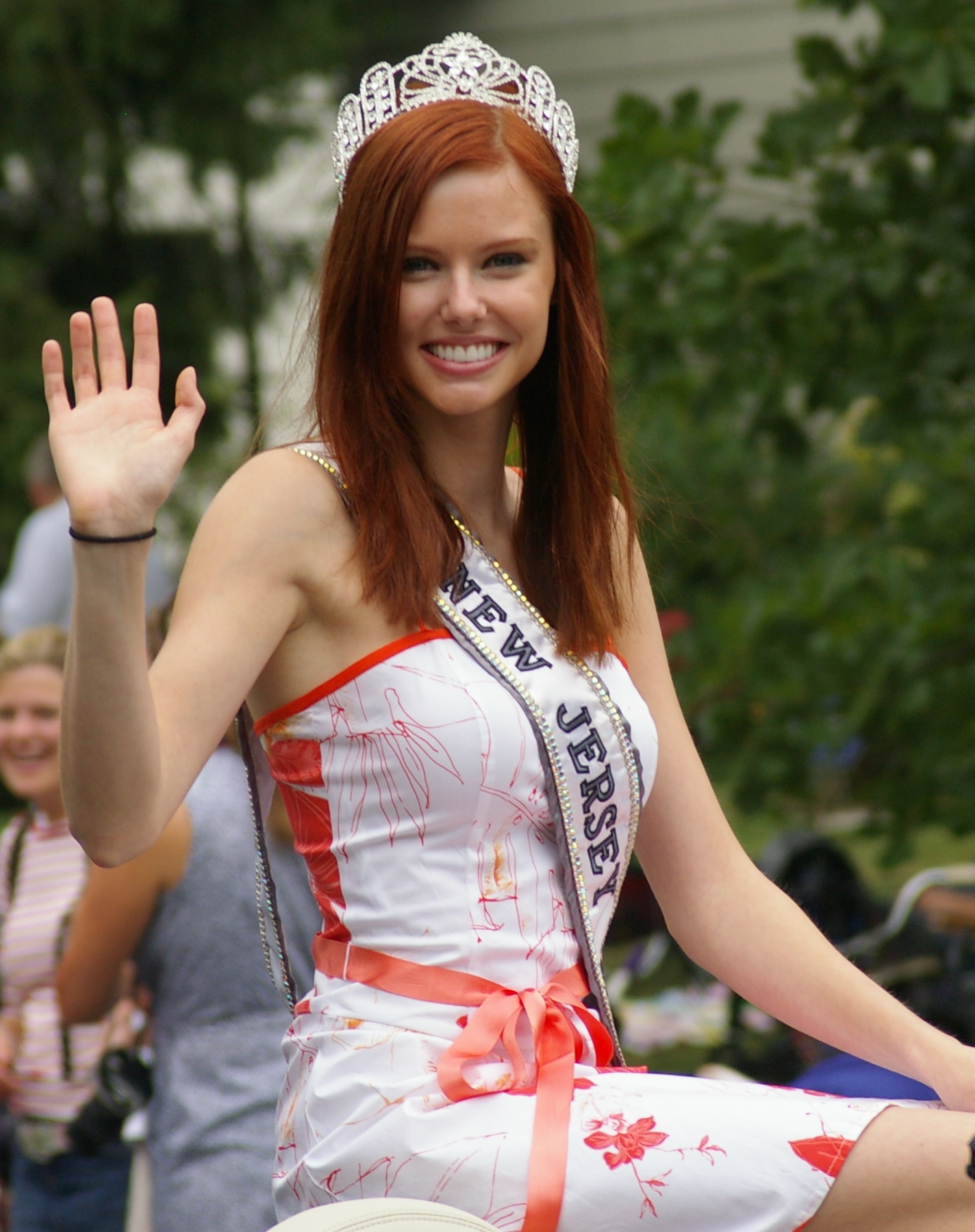
Alyssa Campanella, Miss New Jersey Teen USA 2007, Miss California USA 2011, Miss USA 2011

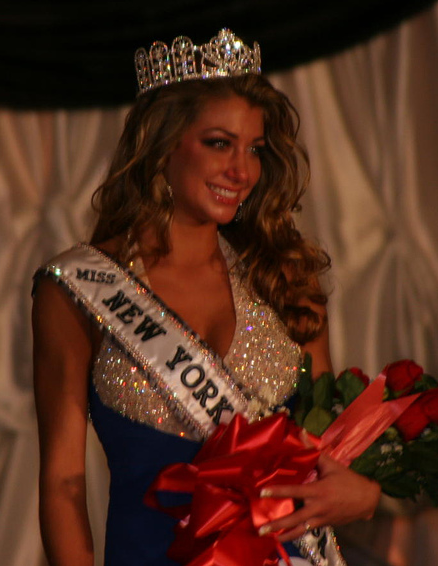
Tatiana Pallagi, Miss New York Teen USA 2007

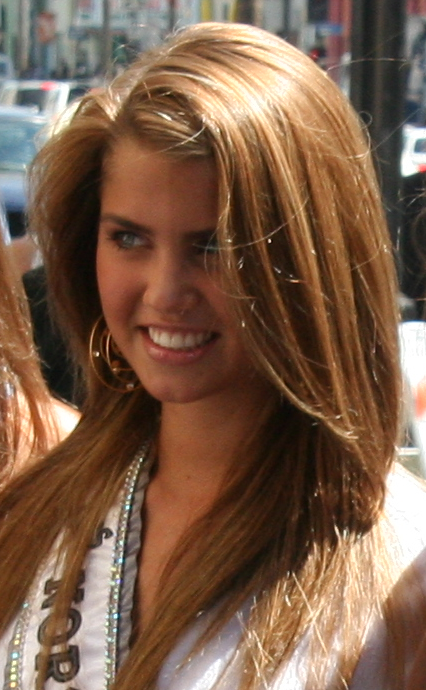
Katie Coble, Miss North Carolina Teen USA 2007

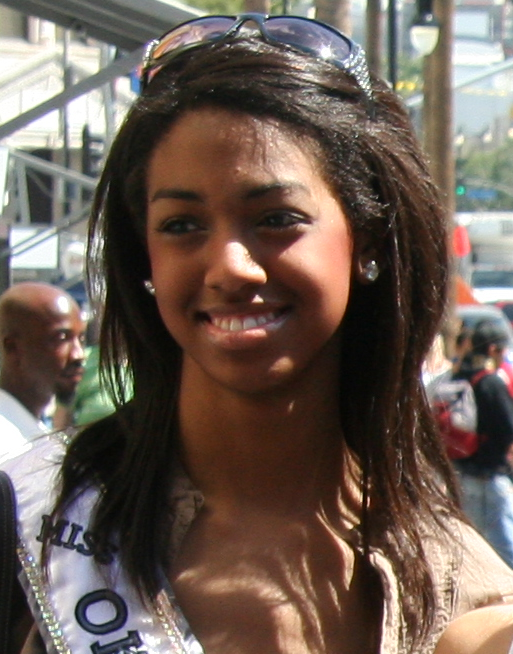
Paige Hill, Miss Oklahoma Teen USA 2007

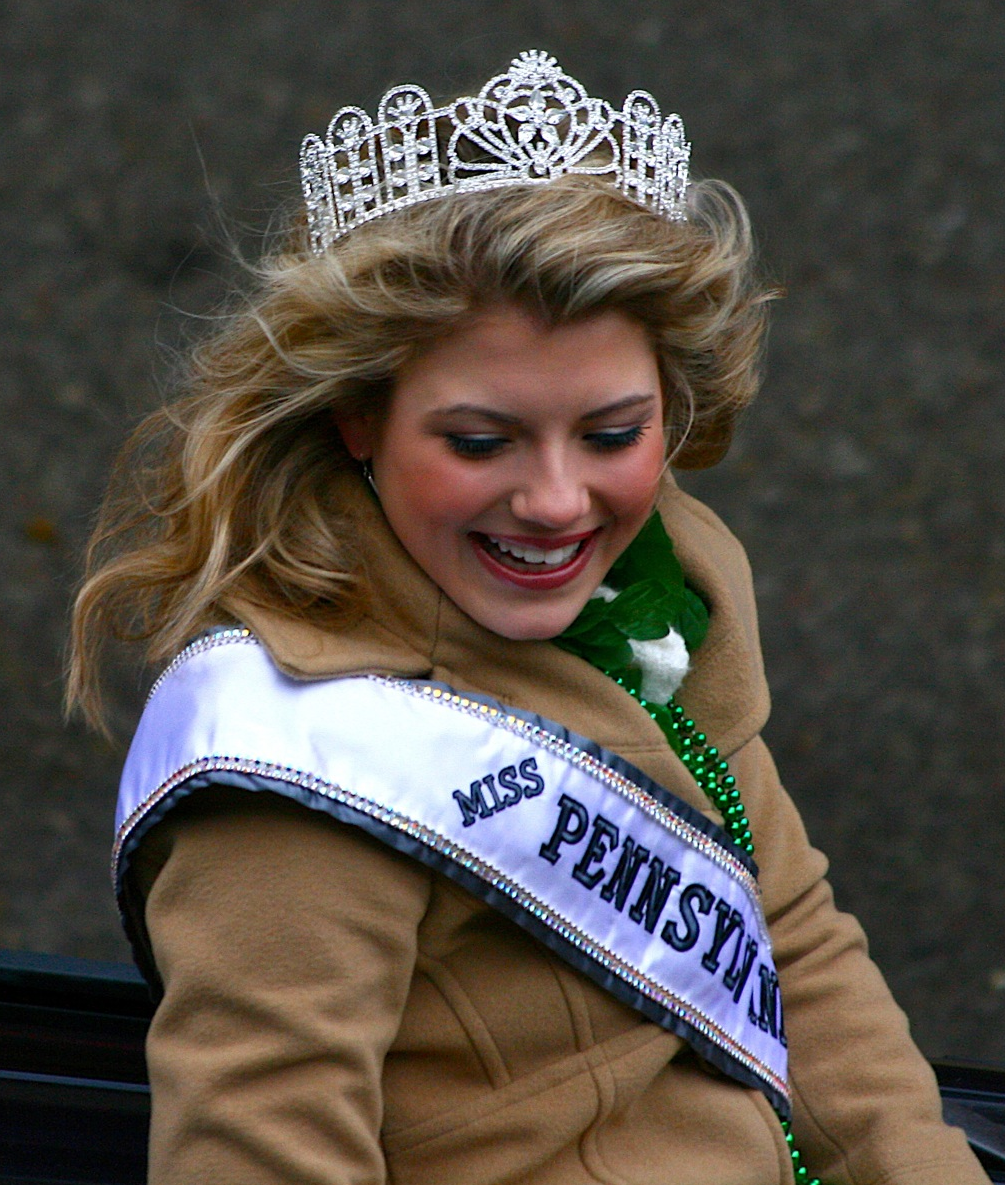
Kelsie Sinagra, Miss Pennsylvania Teen USA 2007

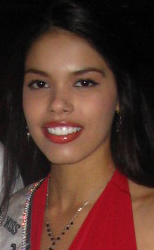
Macy Erwin, Miss Tennessee Teen USA 2007

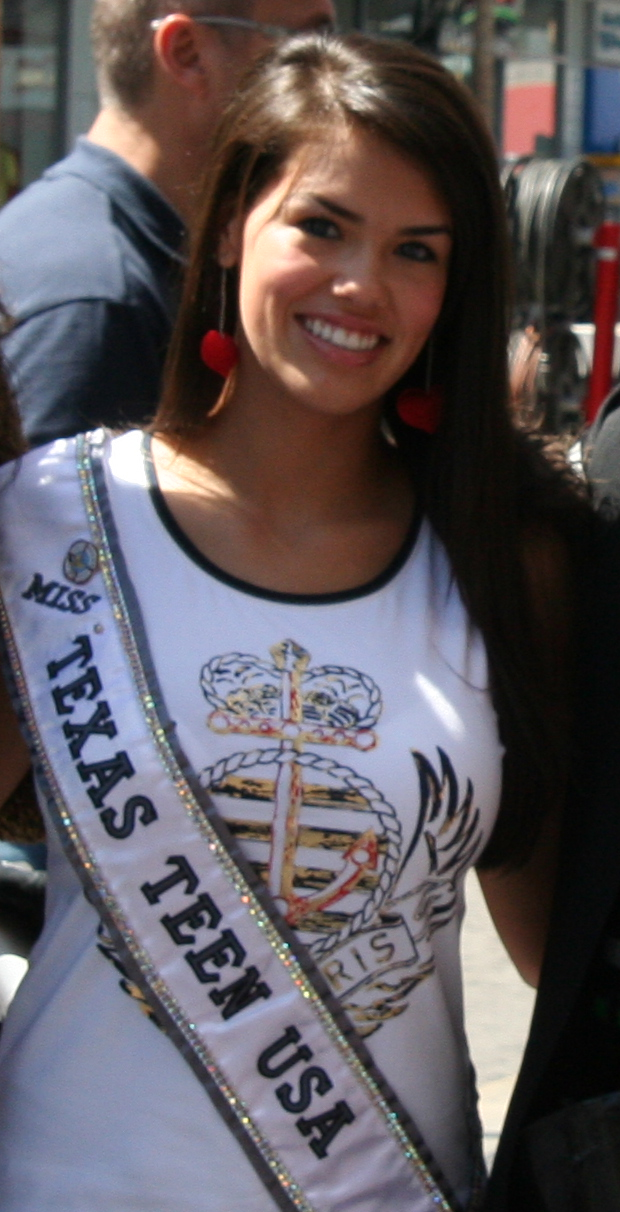
Sommer Isdale, Miss Texas Teen USA 2007

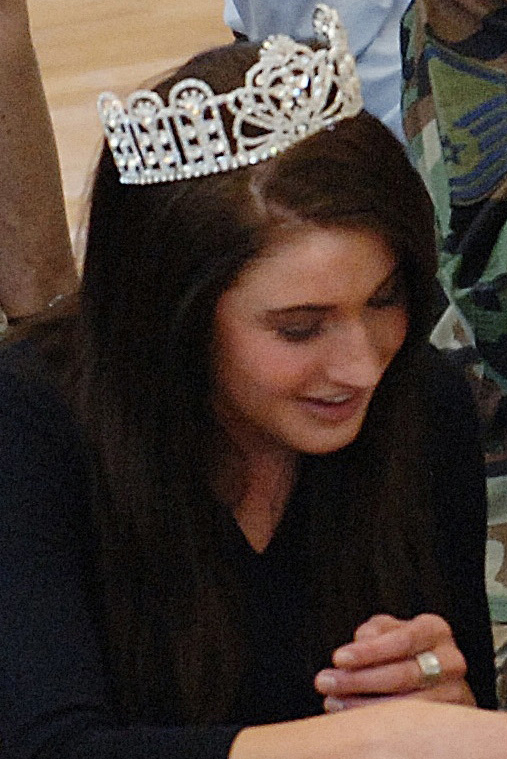
Kelsey Brigel, Miss Utah Teen USA 2007

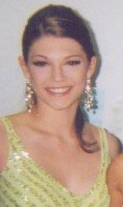
Chelsea Welch, Miss West Virginia Teen USA 2007

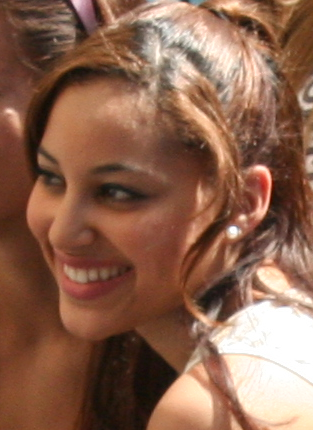
Shauna Sabir, Miss Wisconsin Teen USA 2007

== See also ==
- Miss USA 2007
- Miss Universe 2007
