= Alyssa Campanella =

American model (born 1990)

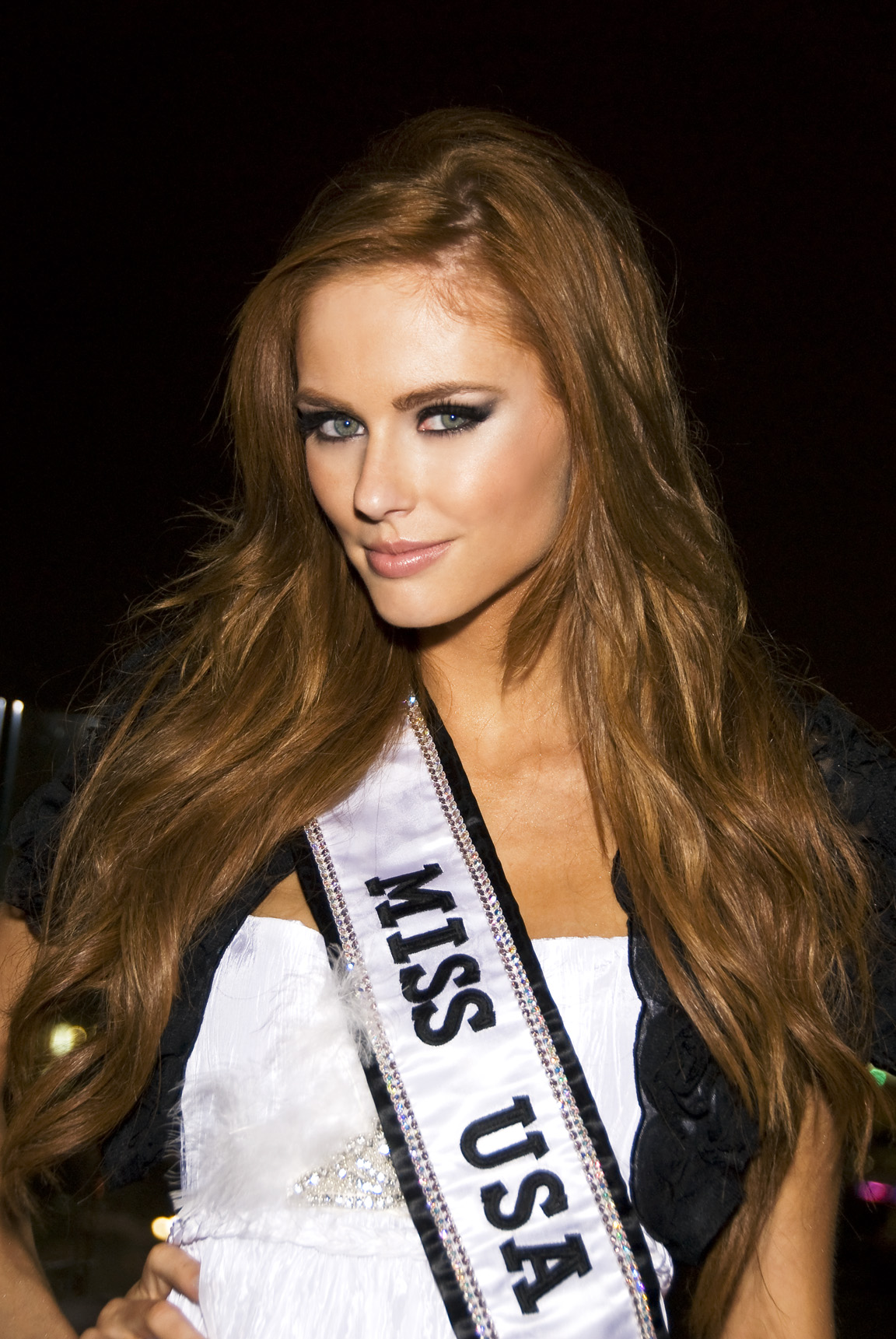
- Campanella in 2011
- Born: Alyssa Marie Campanella; March 21, 1990 (age 36); New Brunswick, New Jersey, U.S.
- Height: 1.74 m (5 ft 9 in)
- Spouse: Torrance Coombs (m. 2016; div. 2019)
- Children: 1
- Beauty pageant titleholder
- Title: Miss New Jersey Teen USA 2007; Miss California USA 2011; Miss USA 2011
- Major competitions: Miss New Jersey Teen USA 2007; (Winner); Miss Teen USA 2007; (1st Runner-Up); Miss California USA 2011; (Winner); Miss USA 2011; (Winner); Miss Universe 2011; (Top 16)

Alyssa Marie Campanella (born March 21, 1990) is an American beauty pageant titleholder who was crowned Miss USA 2011. Having previously been crowned Miss California USA 2011. Campanella was also crowned Miss New Jersey Teen USA 2007 and was first runner-up at Miss Teen USA 2007. Campanella was the sixth woman representing California to win the Miss USA title. As Miss USA, Campanella represented the United States at Miss Universe 2011, where she reached the Top 16.

== Early life and education ==
Campanella was born on March 21, 1990 and is of mixed Italian, Danish, and Lithuanian descent; her father's family originates in Naples, while her maternal grandfather emigrated from Espergærde in Denmark to the United States in the 1950s.

Campanella was born in New Brunswick, New Jersey and raised in Manalapan Township, New Jersey. Campanella graduated from Freehold Township High School.

== Pageantry ==
=== Miss Teen USA ===
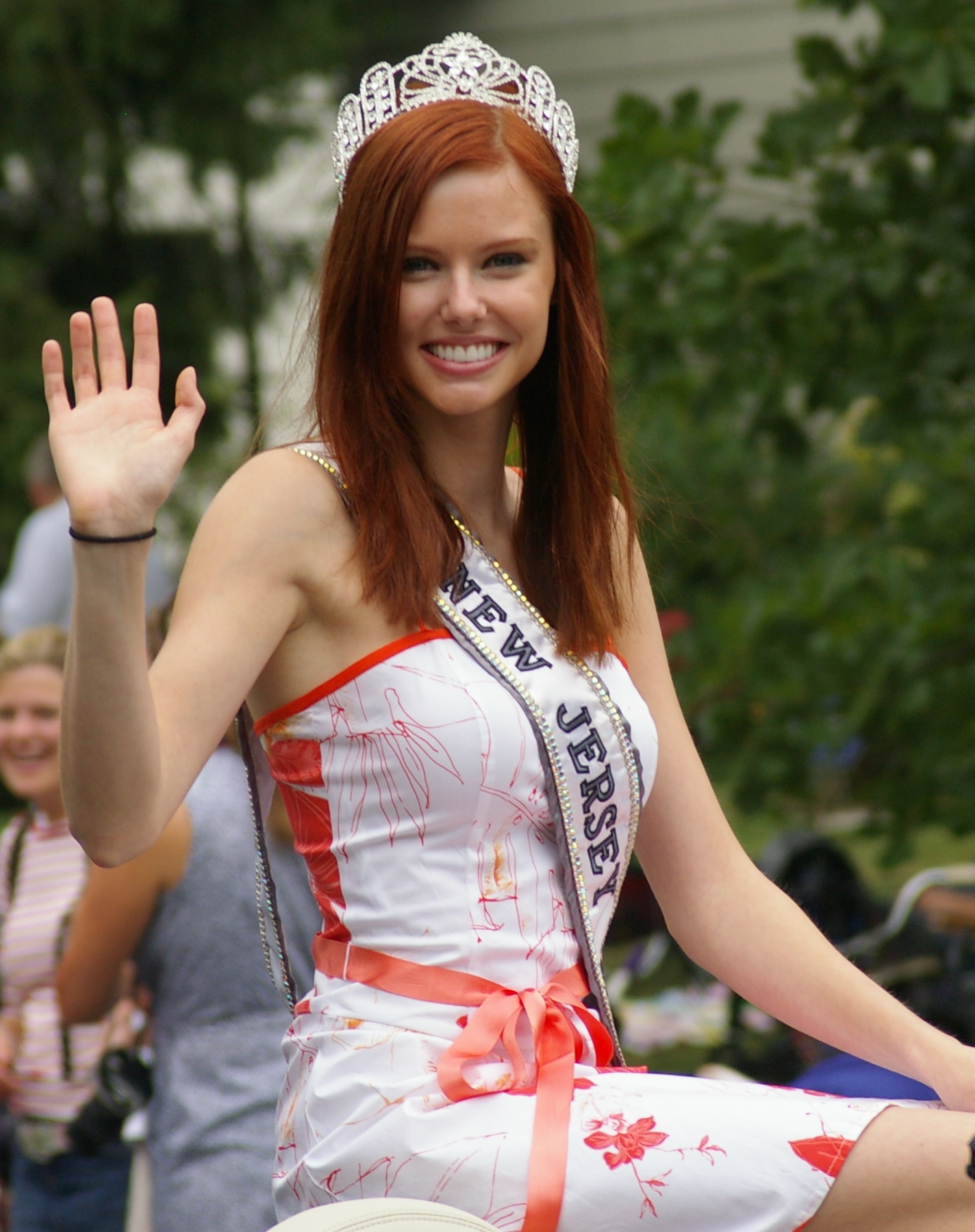
Campanella during her year as Miss New Jersey Teen USA

In October 2006, Campanella was crowned Miss New Jersey Teen USA 2007 and represented her state at Miss Teen USA 2007, broadcast live from Pasadena, California on August 24, 2007, placing first runner up to eventual winner, Hilary Cruz of Colorado. She was the highest placing New Jersey teen state titleholder in the Miss Teen USA competition until UmaSofia Srivastava's win in 2023. She is the most successful contestant from New Jersey, as first runner up at Miss Teen USA and later winning Miss USA.

=== Miss USA ===
Campanella competed in the Miss New Jersey USA pageant twice, placing first runner-up in 2009, losing to Kaity Rodriguez and in the top fifteen in 2010.

On November 21, 2010, she competed in the Miss California USA pageant and won the title and was crowned by outgoing titleholder Nicole Johnson. She was the first Miss Teen USA state delegate to represent California at Miss USA since Shauna Gambill in 1998.

On June 19, 2011, she won the Miss USA title in Las Vegas, Nevada. She is the second redhead (although she is naturally blonde) and the first Miss Teen USA first runner up to win the Miss USA title, as well as the first winner from the West Coast since Shannon Marketic won in 1992 also representing California and the first from the Western region since Brook Lee in 1997 who won representing Hawaii. After winning Miss USA, Campanella crowned Miss Teen USA 2006 titleholder Katie Blair as her Miss California USA successor. Her sister titleholders were Danielle Doty of Texas and Leila Lopes of Angola.

In July 2011, Campanella attended the Miss Teen USA 2011 competition in the Bahamas. She also traveled to Los Angeles, California to attend the premiere of Captain America: The First Avenger.

In October 2011, Campanella traveled to Chicago on behalf of the USO for their Star Spangled Banner Salute Gala. She also traveled to Boston to promote breast cancer awareness month with Susan G. Komen for the Cure.

In November 2011, Campanella traveled to the Bahamas to attend the Battle 4 Atlantis Basketball competition with several state titleholders about to compete at Miss USA 2012. In December 2011, Campanella traveled to Pensacola, Florida before traveling to Cannes and Monaco for the Five Star Diamond Awards. She traveled back to Los Angeles to attend the First Annual American Giving Awards on NBC. She then traveled to North Carolina to make an appearance at Tribute to the Troops.

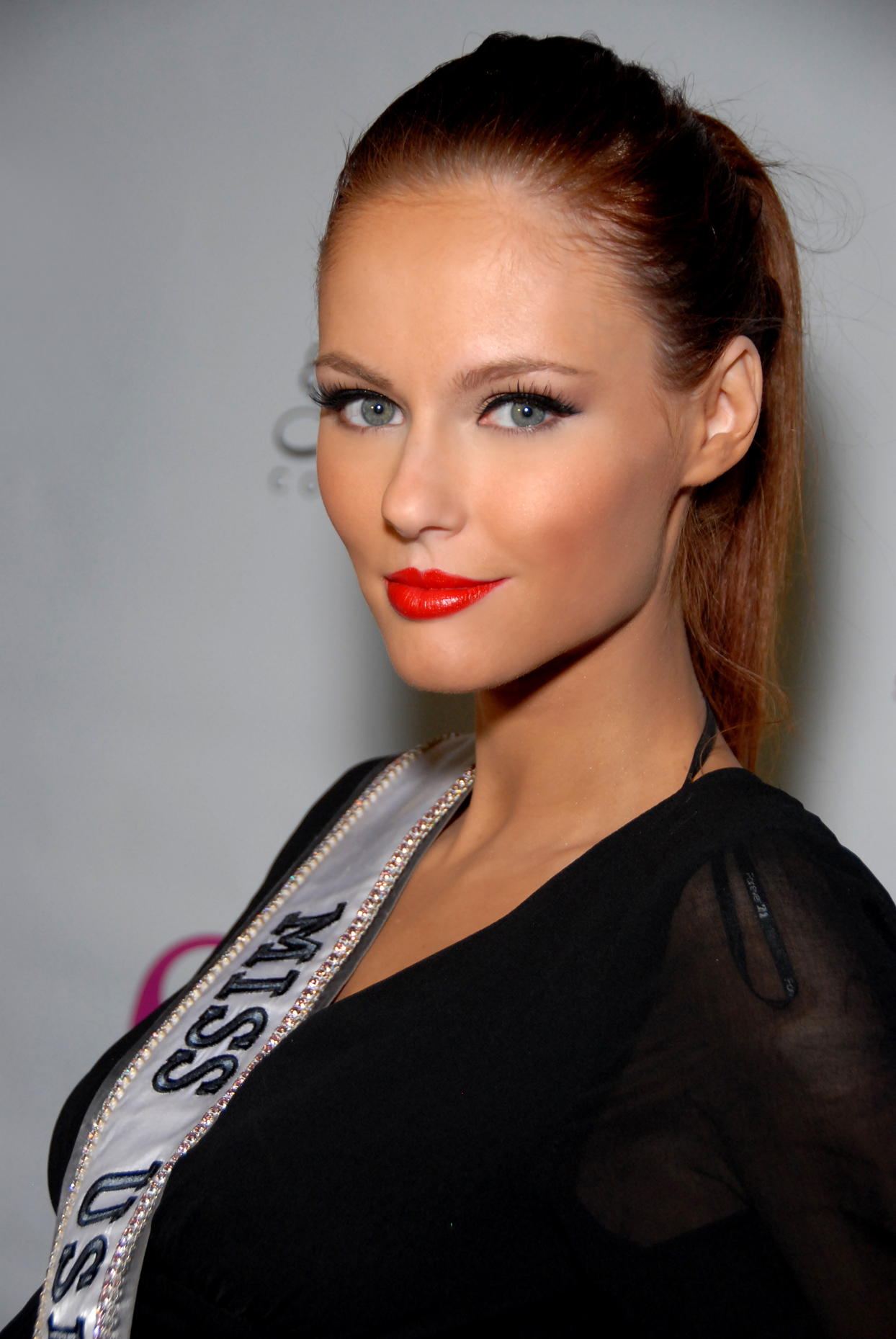
Campanella in 2012

In January 2012, Campanella traveled to Palm Springs, California to attend the Miss California USA 2012 pageant. She also attended the Miss Nevada USA 2012 pageant in Las Vegas later that month, where she was a special guest at the grand opening of 1Oak at The Mirage.

In March 2012, Campanella traveled to Germany with her sister titleholders for a week-long USO/Armed Forces Entertainment tour on March 9–14, 2012. In May 2012, Campanella traveled to Orlando, Florida to cohost the Runway for Hope fashion show with Mario Lopez before traveling to Las Vegas to pass on her crown. On June 3, 2012, Campanella crowned Olivia Culpo as her successor in Las Vegas, who ultimately went on to win the title of Miss Universe.

During her reign she traveled numerous trips across the United States and made many appearances throughout New York City. She also traveled to Cannes, Monaco, Brazil, Germany, Canada, and The Bahamas.

=== Miss Universe ===
As Miss USA 2011, she went on to compete at Miss Universe 2011 in São Paulo, Brazil, from August 19–September 12, 2011 and reached the top 16, the country's first placement in two years. Her national costume was inspired by a Revolution-era colonial outfit.

== Other work ==
Campanella began modeling at age 16 in New York City and has appeared in Marie Claire, Allure, InStyle, Elle, and Women's Health magazines. She has modeled in campaigns for Sherri Hill, Aloxxi International, and Conair. Campanella has modeled in Mercedes Benz Fashion Week in New York City in 2010, 2011, and 2012. Campanella appeared in Old Navy's "Bold is the New Black" commercial in 2012.Old Navy Commercial Campanella stars as a "Hotbot" in a Super Bowl 2013 commercial to introduce Kia Motors' new 2014 Forte Compact Sedan.

In January 2012, she was one of eight celebrities participating in the Food Network reality series Rachael vs. Guy: Celebrity Cook-Off. She was eliminated in the second week of the competition.

In 2013, she posed partially nude, with three other Miss USA winners for a PETA anti-fur campaign to "put an end" to the use of fur coats as award prizes in pageantries.

She now runs a style and travel blog called "The A List."

== Personal life ==
Campanella began dating Canadian actor Torrance Coombs in 2010. On June 12, 2015, it was announced that she and Coombs had become engaged a month earlier. On April 2, 2016, they were married in Santa Ynez, California. In April 2019, the couple announced they had separated earlier that year and amicably divorced.

She met her current husband, a pilot, in 2010; they began dating in 2019 and got married at City Hall during the COVID-19 pandemic with just his parents as witnesses. Campanella announced on her Instagram in 2022 that she was expecting their first child. She gave birth to a daughter in November 2022.

Awards and achievements
Preceded by Julianna White	Miss New Jersey Teen USA; 2007	Succeeded by Michelle Leonardo
Preceded by Melissa Langefelt, North Carolina	Miss Teen USA 1st runner-up 2007	Succeeded by Brittany Pjetraj, South Carolina
Preceded by Nicole Johnson	Miss California USA; 2011	Succeeded by Katie Blair
Preceded by Rima Fakih, Michigan	Miss USA; 2011	Succeeded by Olivia Culpo, Rhode Island
