= Miss Montana Teen USA =

Beauty pageant competition

- Formation: 1983
- Type: Beauty pageant
- Headquarters: Great Falls
- Location: Montana
- Members: Miss Teen USA
- Official language: English
- Website: Official website

The Miss Montana Teen USA competition is the pageant that selects the representative for the state of Montana in the Miss Teen USA pageant. From 1994 to 2007, it was directed by Carol Hirata and the Carlton Group, based in Bellvue, Colorado. In 2012, it was taken by Pageants NW Productions based in Puyallup, Washington. Since 2021, the pageant is based in Great Falls, Montana under the direction of Lime Light Enterprises.

Montana is the least successful state at Miss Teen USA, placing only twice, in 2006 (when Katie Blair won the title) and in 2024, when Kailey Burress placed in the top twenty.

Rowan Cross of Glendale, AZ was appointed Miss Montana Teen USA on July 30th, 2026 after the open casting call from Thomas Brodeur, the new owner of the national pageant. She will represent Montana at Miss Teen USA 2026.

== Gallery of titleholders ==
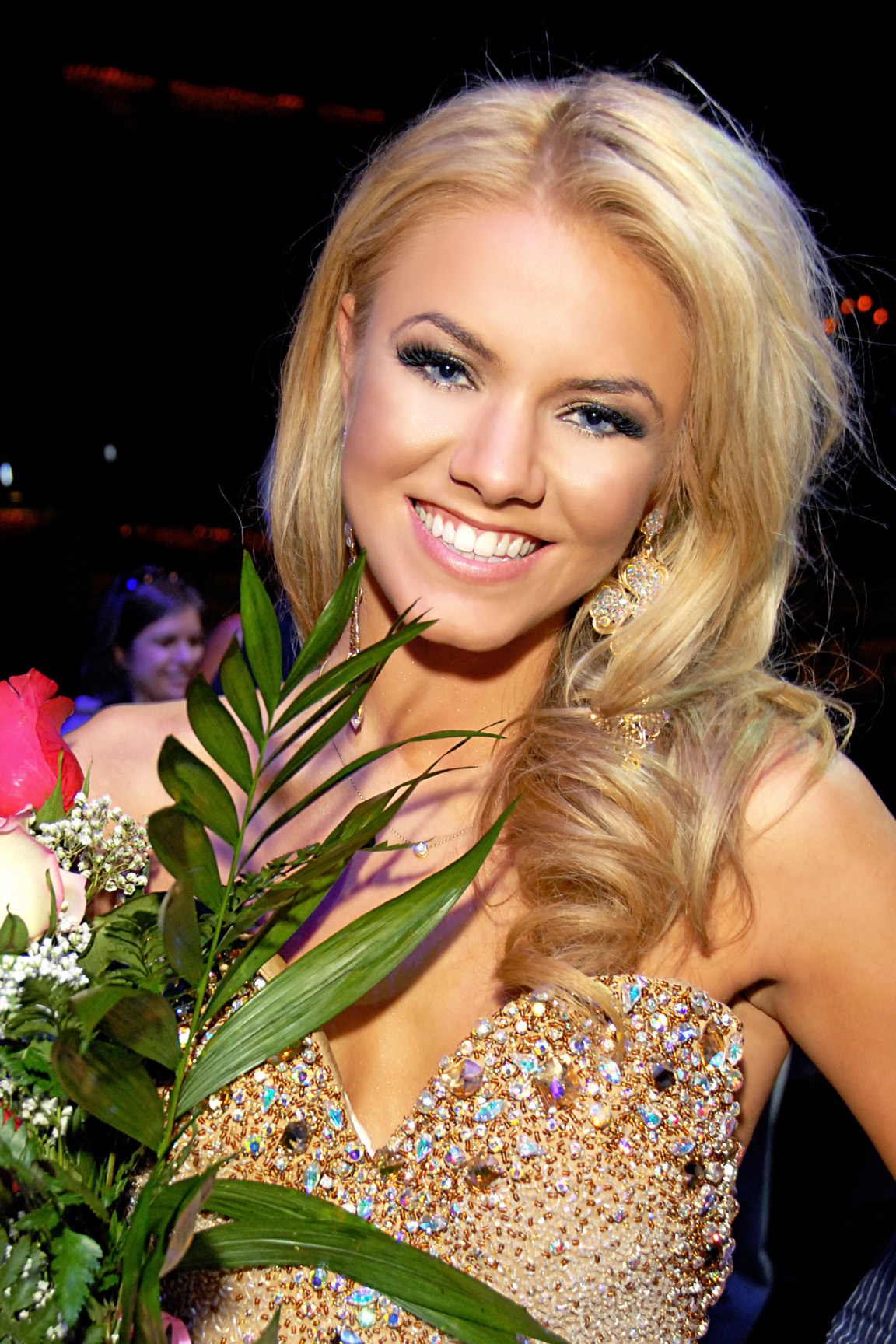
Katie Blair, Miss Montana Teen USA 2006 & Miss Teen USA 2006

== Results summary ==
=== Placements ===
- Miss Teen USA: Katie Blair (2006)
- Top 20: Kailey Burress (2024)

Montana holds a record of 2 placements at Miss Teen USA.

== Winners ==
- Declared as Winner
- Ended as runner-up
- Ended as one of the finalists or semifinalists

Year	Name	Hometown	Age^{1}	Local title	Placement at Miss Teen USA	Special awards at Miss Teen USA	Notes
2026	Rowan Cross	Glendale, AZ	18	Miss Glendale Teen			Daughter of Shellene Cockrell Miss Colorado 1994; 3rd runner-up at Miss Arizona's Teen 2026
2025	Deanna Sophia Perdue	Saint Cloud, FL	16	Miss Saint Cloud Teen			
2024	Kailey Burress	Big Sky	17	Miss Big Sky Teen	Top 20		
2023	Ava Williams	Billings	18	Miss Billings Teen			
2022	Julia Kunau	Lewistown	16				Later Miss Montana's Teen 2023
2021	Katie Tooke	Ekalaka	15				
2020	Morgan Pierce	Lewistown	15				
2019	Megan Brewer	Melstone	17				
2018	Elley Munson	Billings	16				
2017	Elle Cook	Billings	17				
2016	Jami Forseth	Huntley	18				Later Miss Montana USA 2021
2015	Miranda Youngren	Columbus	17				
2014	Madyson Rigg	Kalispell	17				Later Miss Montana USA 2023
2013	Maurissa Gunn	Park City	16	Miss Laurel Teen			
2012	Danica Jansma	Manhattan	15				
2011	Sibahn Doxey	Frenchtown	18				Later Miss Montana USA 2016
2010	Dakota Mackey	Missoula	18				
2009	Haley Boyer	Stevensville	17				
2008	Stacey Velasco	Dillon	18				
2007	Chelsea Nelson	Billings	17				
2006	Katie Blair	Billings	18		Miss Teen USA 2006		She is the first Miss Montana Teen USA to make the semifinals at the national pageant.: Later assumed the Miss California USA 2011 title.
2005	Kendall Powell	Missoula	17				
2004	Autumn Muller	Harlowton	17				Later Miss Montana USA 2012
2003	Arielle Brown	Billings	17				
2002	Meghan Minnick	Missoula	15				
2001	Kristi Krings	Billings	18				Won the Grand Prize in the John Lennon Songwriting Competition for her original song "I Am Found."
2000	Renae Skogen	Conrad	19				
1999	Raylene Miller	Great Falls	18				
1998	Maggie Stoker	Bigfork	18				Daughter of Mike Stoker from 1970s TV series Emergency!
1997	Coty Strickler	Dillon	17				
1996	Grace Tubbs	Helena	17				
1995	Christi Hanson	Helena	17				
1994	Desiree Gravelle	Kalispell	18				
1993	Angela Carter	Kalispell	18				
1992	Aubrey Jo Hiller	Missoula	19				Later Miss Montana 1996
1991	Theresa Rosenbaum	Missoula	18				
1990	Stephanie Wallace	Billings	17				
1989	Jennifer Cook	Stevensville	17				
1988	Kristen Anderson	Columbia Falls	17				Later Miss Montana USA 1993
1987	Andrea Madsen	Bozeman	17				
1986	Karry Koslecki	Bozeman	17				
1985	Katie Adams	Kalispell	18				
1984	Pam Miller	Columbia Falls	17				
1983	Leslie Elaine Lucas	Miles City	16				

^{1} Age at the time of the Miss Teen USA pageant
