= Miss Teen USA 1996 =

14th edition of the Miss Teen USA competition

- Date: August 21, 1996
- Presenters: Bob Goen; Shari Belafonte
- Entertainment: The Monkees
- Venue: Pan American Center, Las Cruces, New Mexico
- Broadcaster: CBS; KDBC-TV
- Entrants: 51
- Placements: 10
- Winner: Christie Lee Woods; Texas
- Congeniality: Lavinia Magruder; Vermont
- Photogenic: Kelly Gaudet; Florida

Miss Teen USA 1996, the 14th Miss Teen USA pageant, was televised live from Las Cruces, New Mexico, on August 21, 1996. At the conclusion of the final competition, Christie Lee Woods of Texas was crowned by outgoing queen Keylee Sue Sanders of Kansas.

The pageant was hosted by Bob Goen for the third and final year, with color commentary by Shari Belafonte and entertainment from The Monkees. This was the only year that the pageant was held in Las Cruces, although Albuquerque had previously played host to the 1987 Miss USA pageant. For the first time ever, 6 out of 10 semifinalists were African-American.

== Delegates ==
The Miss Teen USA 1996 delegates were:

- Alabama - Luann Roberts
- Alaska - Brandee McCoskey
- Arizona - Courtney Hamilton
- Arkansas - Aimee Delatte
- California - Michelle Cardamon
- Colorado - Ara Francis
- Connecticut - Marissa Perez
- Delaware - Ashley Anderson
- District of Columbia - Shannan McCray
- Florida - Kelly Gaudet
- Georgia - Summer Newmann
- Hawaii - Monica Ivey
- Idaho - Suzan Dandeneau
- Illinois - Eisa Istok
- Indiana - Misha Ivetich
- Iowa - Allison Dickey
- Kansas - Amanda Carraway
- Kentucky - Kelly Marie Sodan
- Louisiana - Kimi Fairchild
- Maine - Laura Larson
- Maryland - Jennifer Smith
- Massachusetts - Maria Menounos
- Michigan - Tamika Thomas
- Minnesota - Sarah Cahill
- Mississippi - Brandee Layne Loving
- Missouri - Leah Sexton
- Montana - Grace Murray Tubbs
- Nebraska - Mandy Groff
- Nevada - Cerina Vincent
- New Hampshire - Melissa Coish
- New Jersey - Jessica Ponzo
- New Mexico - Whitni Zimmerman
- New York - Aiesha Hendrick
- North Carolina - Tammy Ashton
- North Dakota - Katrina Bergstrom
- Ohio - Tara Shaffer
- Oklahoma - Latoya Farley
- Oregon - Heather Noelle Jones
- Pennsylvania - Patricia Campbell
- Rhode Island - Kelly Dutra
- South Carolina - Wendy Christina Roberts
- South Dakota - Tatewin Means
- Tennessee - Adrienne Parker
- Texas - Christie Lee Woods
- Utah - Jodi Webb
- Vermont - Lavinia Magruder
- Virginia - Kandy Marshall
- Washington - Emily Ballard
- West Virginia - Heather Gray
- Wisconsin - Nicole Lynn Werra
- Wyoming - Michelle Marie Jefferson
