= Miss Teen USA 1993 =

11th edition of the Miss Teen USA competition

- Date: August 10, 1993
- Presenters: Dick Clark; Arthel Neville; Kelly Hu
- Venue: Gulf Coast Coliseum, Biloxi, Mississippi
- Broadcaster: CBS; WHLT
- Entrants: 51
- Placements: 12
- Winner: Charlotte Lopez; Vermont
- Congeniality: Juliana Kaulukukui; Hawaii
- Photogenic: Melanie Breedlove; Missouri

Miss Teen USA 1993, the 11th Miss Teen USA pageant, was televised live from the Mississippi Gulf Coast Coliseum in Biloxi, Mississippi on 10 August 1993.

At the conclusion of the final competition, Charlotte Lopez of Vermont was crowned by outgoing titleholder Jamie Solinger of Iowa.

The pageant was hosted by Dick Clark for the fourth and final year, with color commentary by Arthel Neville and Miss Teen USA 1985 Kelly Hu for the final time. Music was provided by the Gulf Coast Teen Orchestra.

This was the fourth of five years that the pageant was held in Biloxi. Contestants arrived on 26 June and were involved in two weeks of events and preliminary competition prior to the final broadcast, such as pre-taping scenes along the Mississippi coast, and being involved in an autograph signing party.

== Delegates ==
The Miss Teen USA 1993 delegates were:

- Alabama - Autumn Smith
- Alaska - Christine Michelle Thorson
- Arizona - Danielle Jean Normandin
- Arkansas - Tiffany Brooke Parks
- California - Stefanie Sweeney
- Colorado - Susie Garifi
- Connecticut - Cynthia Schneck
- Delaware - Catherine Huang
- District of Columbia - Rebecca Marie Slobig
- Florida - Allison Ann McKinney
- Georgia - Denesha Reed
- Hawaii - Juliana Maili Kaulukukui
- Idaho - Jan Cartwright
- Illinois - Jaime Lyn Holbrook
- Indiana - Kelly Ann Lloyd
- Iowa - Melissa Baxter
- Kansas - Christy Dippre
- Kentucky - Holly Renee Riggs
- Louisiana - Heather Gale DuPree
- Maine - Jill Erin Mellen
- Maryland - Angelisa Proserpi
- Massachusetts - January Louise Newcombe
- Michigan - Ashley Renai Whitt
- Minnesota - Charity Rose Lundy
- Mississippi - Bridgette Renee Kane
- Missouri - Melanie Breedlove
- Montana - Angela Hope Carter
- Nebraska - Lauriette Katherine Logan
- Nevada - Tammie Marie Rankin
- New Hampshire - Gretchen Lynn Durgin
- New Jersey - Heather Michelle Brenner
- New Mexico - Lynette Ochoa
- New York - Sara Rae Gore
- North Carolina - Wendy Marie Williams
- North Dakota - Wendy Howe
- Ohio - Melissa Susan Yust
- Oklahoma - Stacie Caroline Case
- Oregon - Jill Marie Chartier
- Pennsylvania - Ursula Abbott
- Rhode Island - Alicia Currier
- South Carolina - Lauren Poppell
- South Dakota - Amy Rahlf
- Tennessee - Jaime Dudney
- Texas - Erin Gail Burnett
- Utah - Amy Elizabeth Carlson
- Vermont - Charlotte Anne Lopez
- Virginia - Heather Dawn Anderson
- Washington - Rebecca Kimberly Vaughn
- West Virginia - Jennifer Pringle
- Wisconsin - Tanae Gabryelle Geisler
- Wyoming - Lana Rene Hansen

== Host city ==
Following the 1992 event, local hoteliers signalled that they may no longer be able to furnish free accommodation for the contestants for the 1993 pageant. Although the Tourism Commission was contracted to host the pageant until 1994, they considered getting out of the contract because of the increased cost of paying for the rooms.

The pageant went ahead in Biloxi as planned, and it was estimated that the region benefitted by $1 million for hosting the event.
