= Michelle Leonardo =

American model

- Born: June 28, 1991 (age 35); Montclair, New Jersey, U.S.
- Education: Suffolk University (BS)
- Height: 5 ft 7 in (1.70 m)
- Beauty pageant titleholder
- Title: Miss New Jersey Teen USA 2008; Miss New Jersey USA 2012
- Hair color: Brown
- Eye color: Brown
- Major competitions: Miss New Jersey Teen USA 2008 (Winner); Miss Teen USA 2008; Miss Teen United States World - 2009 (Winner); Miss Teen World 2009 (3rd Runner-Up); Miss New Jersey USA 2012 (Winner); Miss USA 2012 (Top 10)

Michelle Leonardo (born June 28, 1991) is an American dancer and model and beauty pageant contestant who won the Miss New Jersey Teen USA pageant in 2008 and the Miss New Jersey USA pageant in 2012. She placed in the Top 10 at Miss USA 2012. She won Miss Teen United States-World 2009 and placed 3rd runner up at Miss Teen World 2009.

Leonardo is currently a Digital Investment Supervisor at Horizon Media and is dancing for the New York Knicks. In 2015, Leonardo was a dancer for the Boston Celtics. She appeared on Guiding Light and in print ads for corporations such as Polaroid, Million Dollar Baby Swimsuits and Sesame Street Kids. She has been in three Seventeen Magazine Fashion shows including one for Fall New York Fashion Week. She was an on-air reporter for the Boston-based show Style It Up.

Michelle Leonardo was born to Anthony and Laura Leonardo in Montclair, New Jersey and raised in Tinton Falls. She has one younger sister, Lainie. Leonardo attended Red Bank Catholic High School in Red Bank, New Jersey. She graduated from Suffolk University in Boston, Massachusetts, where she obtained her Bachelor of Science in broadcast journalism.

Awards and achievements
Preceded by Julianna White	Miss New Jersey USA; 2012	Succeeded by Libell Durán
Preceded by Alyssa Campanella	Miss New Jersey Teen USA; 2008	Succeeded by Alexa Brunetti
