= Miss Wyoming Teen USA =

Beauty pageant competition

- Formation: 1983
- Type: Beauty pageant
- Headquarters: Savage
- Location: Minnesota
- Members: Miss Teen USA
- Official language: English

The Miss Wyoming Teen USA competition is the pageant that selects the representative for the state of Wyoming in the Miss Teen USA pageant.

Wyoming's highest placement was at Miss Teen USA 1985 when Emily Ernst placed first runner-up to Kelly Hu of Hawaii.

Six Miss Wyoming Teen USA winners have gone on to win the Miss Wyoming USA title and compete at Miss USA.

Joie Kennedy of Niwot, CO was appointed Miss Wyoming Teen USA on July 30th, 2026 after the open casting call from Thomas Brodeur, the new owner of the national pageant. She will represent Wyoming at Miss Teen USA 2026.

== Results summary ==
=== Placements ===
- 1st runner-up: Emily Ernst (1985)
- Top 5: Gina DeBernardi (1998)
- Top 15/16/20: Mollie Smith (2007), Amy David (2009), Caroline Scott (2010), Sydney Graus (2012), Autumn Schieferstein (2017), Grace Turner (2019), Teryn Thatcher (2021), Addison Hollensworth (2025), Joie Kennedy (2026)

Wyoming holds a record of 11 placements at Miss Teen USA

=== Awards ===
Miss Photogenic: Addison Hollensworth (2025)

== Winners ==
- Declared as Winner
- Ended as runner-up
- Ended as one of the finalists or semifinalists

Year	Name	Hometown	Age^{1}	Local title	Placement at Miss Teen USA	Special awards at Miss Teen USA	Notes
2026	Joie Kennedy	Niwot, CO	17	Miss Boulder County Teen	Top 20		Semi-finalist & Miss Photogenic at Miss Colorado Teen USA 2024; 1st runner-up at Miss Colorado's Teen 2024; 3rd runner-up at Miss Colorado's Teen 2026
2025	Addison Hollensworth	Little Rock, AR	18	Miss Wye Mountain Teen	Top 20	Miss Photogenic	Previously Miss Arkansas Teen Volunteer 2025
2024	Aubree Kruger	Worland	18	Miss Washakie County Teen			Miss Cass County (ND) 2027
2023	Victoria Salas	Evanston	19	Miss Evanston Teen			
2022	Nora Steinke	Laramie	17	Miss Laramie Teen			Cousin of Erin Shae Swanson, Miss Nebraska Teen USA 2019
2021	Teryn Thatcher	Kemmerer	18		Top 16		
2020	Baylee Drewry	Greybull	16				Later Miss Wyoming 2024
2019	Grace Turner	Jackson	18		Top 15		
2018	Mackenzie Kern	Casper	17				Later Miss Wyoming USA 2021
2017	Autumn Schieferstein	Cheyenne	15		Top 15		
2016	Shelly McRoberts	Cheyenne	17				
2015	Payton Sanders	Casper	16				Sister of Miss Wyoming Teen USA 2014
2014	Karlie Sanders	Casper		17			Sister of Miss Wyoming Teen USA 2015
2013	Autumn Olson	Saratoga	18				Later Miss Wyoming USA 2016
2012	Sydney Graus	Jackson Hole	17		Top 15		
2011	Ashley Golden	Gillette	17				Previously Miss Wyoming's Outstanding Teen 2007
2010	Caroline Scott	Cheyenne	17		Top 15		Later Miss Wyoming USA 2015
2009	Amy David	Pinedale	17		Top 15		
2008	Callie Bishop	Casper	18				Later Miss Wyoming USA 2018
2007	Mollie Smith	Casper	17		Top 15		
2006	Katy Lambert	Worland	18				
2005	Brenna Mader	Gillette	18				Sister of Jamie Mader, Miss Wyoming Teen USA 2002; Later Miss Tennessee USA 2013
2004	Maddison Strasheim	Cheyenne	18				
2003	Kasi Johnston	Cheyenne	16				
2002	Jamie Mader	Gillette	17				Sister of Brenna Mader, Miss Wyoming Teen USA 2005 and Miss Tennessee USA 2013
2001	Natalie Koontz	Cody	18				
2000	Kristin George	Casper	18				Later Miss Wyoming USA 2006
1999	Katie Rudoff	Green River	16				Later Miss Wyoming USA 2004
1998	Gina DeBernardi	Rock Springs	18		Top 5		
1997	Esmerelda Trinidad Gonzales	Green River	18				
1996	Michelle Jefferson	Casper	18				
1995	Erica Williams	Cheyenne	16				
1994	Whitney Alstrom	Casper	15				
1993	Lana Hansen	Gillette	15				
1992	Dondi Bowman	Lingle	15				
1991	Britta Lund	Sheridan	15				
1990	Janet Poccup	Cheyenne	18				
1989	Gretchen Wathen	Casper	17				
1988	Michele Apostoles	Casper	17				
1987	Kim Roberts	Rock Springs	18				
1986	Julie Henry	Gillette	17				
1985	Emily Ernst	Gillette	17		1st runner-up		
1984	Allison Falk	Gillette	19				
1983	Shanna Thompson	Casper	15				

^{1} Age at the time of the Miss Teen USA pageant
