= Miss USA 2011 =

60th Miss USA pageant

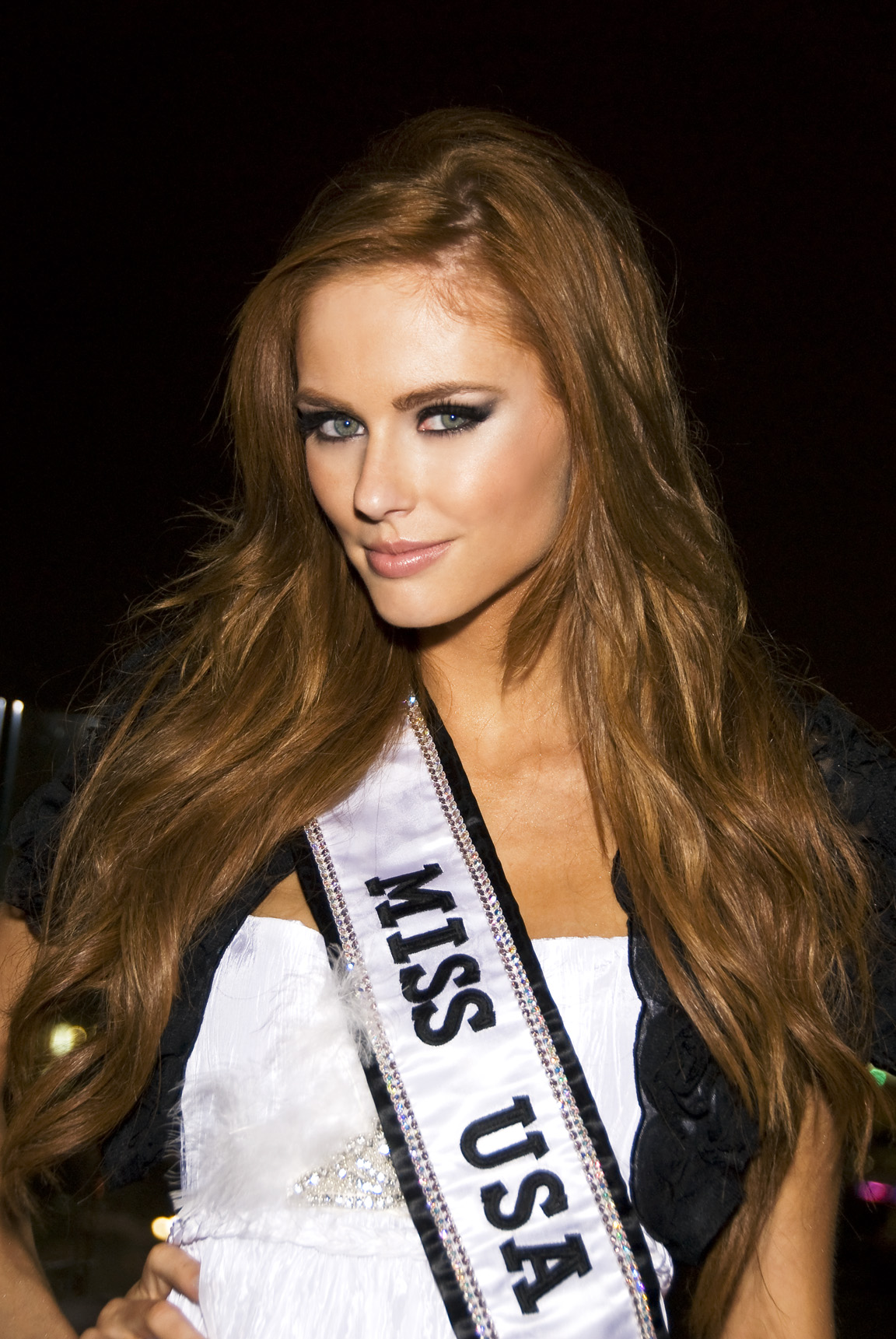
- Alyssa Campanella, Miss USA 2011
- Date: June 19, 2011
- Presenters: Andy Cohen; Giuliana Rancic; Kelly Osbourne; Susie Castillo
- Entertainment: Tinie Tempah; Eric Turner
- Venue: Planet Hollywood Theatre for the Performing Arts, Paradise, Nevada
- Broadcaster: NBC (KSNV-DT); Telemundo (KBLR); STAR World (Asiawide and the Pacific)
- Entrants: 51
- Placements: 16
- Winner: Alyssa Campanella; California

Miss USA 2011 was the 60th Anniversary of the Miss USA pageant, held at the Planet Hollywood Theatre for the Performing Arts in Paradise, Nevada, on June 19, 2011. Rima Fakih of Michigan crowned her successor, Alyssa Campanella of California, at the end of this event. This was California's sixth Miss USA title and the first title since 1992. Campanella represented the United States at the Miss Universe 2011 pageant in São Paulo, Brazil on September 12, 2011.

This pageant gained attention on the internet, when a video of all the contestant's answers to the question, whether evolution should be taught in school, was put on YouTube. Only two contestants affirmed that it should be taught, with the others confusing the question with the debate on evolution of species vs. creationism, or stating that both should be taught.

== Background ==
=== Selection of participants ===
Delegates from 50 states and the District of Columbia were selected in state pageants which began in July 2010 and concluded in January 2011. The first state pageant was Florida, held on July 10, 2010, while the final pageant was Arkansas, held on January 9, 2011. Initially, eight of these delegates were former Miss Teen USA state winners but the number increased to nine after one titleholder resigned and former Teen USA delegate succeeded her, and one former Miss America state winner.

Two state titleholders were appointed as a replacements after the original titleholders were unable to compete. Emily Johnson, the original Miss Maine USA 2011, resigned on April 17, 2011 due to attending her sister's wedding on the day of the pageant. She was replaced by Ashley Marble, who was the first runner-up of the Miss Maine USA 2011 pageant, and Shaletta Tawanna Porterfield, the original Miss Wisconsin USA 2011, resigned on May 12, 2011 after was being charged in Dane County Circuit Court of three felony theft charges. She was replaced by Jordan Morkin, who was the first runner-up of the Miss Wisconsin USA 2011 pageant.

== Results ==
=== Placements ===
Placement	Contestant
Miss USA 2011	California – Alyssa Campanella
1st Runner-Up	Tennessee – Ashley Durham
2nd Runner-Up	Alabama – Madeline Mitchell
3rd Runner-Up	Texas – Ana Rodriguez
Top 8	Hawaii – Angela Byrd; Maine – Ashley Marble; Maryland – Allyn Rose; South Carolina – Courtney Turner
Top 16	Arizona – Brittany Brannon; Florida – Lissette Garcia; (Georgia (U.S. state)) Georgia – Kaylin Reque; Indiana – Jillian Wunderlich; Missouri – Hope Driskill; New Mexico – Brittany Toll; (New York (state)) New York – Amber Collins; Utah – Jamie Crandall

== Delegates ==
State/district	Contestant	Hometown	Age (Note: Ages at the time of the pageant)	Height	Placement	Notes
Alabama	Madeline Mitchell	Russellville	22	5'9"	2nd runner-up	Later Mrs. America 2015
Alaska	Jessica Chuckran	Anchorage	24	5'7"		
Arizona	Brittany Brannon	Paradise Valley	22	5'6"	Top 16	
Arkansas	Lakynn McBride	White Hall	20	5'6"		
California	Alyssa Campanella	Los Angeles	21	5'9"	Miss USA 2011	Previously Miss New Jersey Teen USA 2007
Colorado	Blair Griffith	Denver	23	5'6"		Previously Miss Colorado Teen USA 2006 Later Top 20 Miss Grand International 2013
Connecticut	Regina Turner	Hartford	21	5'7"		
Delaware	Katie Hanson	Newark	20	5'7"		Contestant of Survivor: Philippines
District of Columbia	Heather Swann	Washington, D.C.	23	5'7"		
Florida	Lissette Garcia	Miami	26	5'11"	Top 16	
Georgia	Kaylin Reque	Suwanee	22	5'10"	Top 16	
Hawaii	Angela Byrd	Honolulu	23	5'10"	Top 8	
Idaho	Erza Haliti	Meridian	20	5'6"		
Illinois	Angela Sparrow	Chicago	25	5'7"		
Indiana	Jillian Wunderlich	Kokomo	20	5'6"	Top 16	Previously Miss Florida Teen USA 2008
Iowa	Rebecca Goldsmith	Chariton	26	5'9"		
Kansas	Jaymie Stokes	Lenexa	20	5'11"		Previously Miss Kansas Teen USA 2007
Kentucky	Kia Hampton	Louisville	22	5'5"		
Louisiana	Page Pennock	Shreveport	21	5'9"		
Maine	Ashley Marble	Topsfield	27	5'10"	Top 8	Previously Miss Maine Teen USA 2000; Originally first runner-up, assumed the title after winner Emily Johnson resigned in April 2011 due to attending the latter's sister's wedding.
Maryland	Allyn Rose	Newburg	22	5'8"	Top 8	Later Miss District of Columbia 2012
Massachusetts	Alida D'Angona	Boston	24	5'8"		
Michigan	Channing Pierce	Royal Oak	24	5'9"		
Minnesota	Brittany Lee Thelemann	Plymouth	24	5'9"		
Mississippi	Keeley Patterson	Starkville	20	5'7"		
Missouri	Hope Driskill	Jefferson City	22	5'9"	Top 16	Contestant of Survivor: Caramoan
Montana	Brittany Wiser	Bozeman	23	5'9"		Previously Miss Montana 2009
Nebraska	Haley Herold	Omaha	23	5'7"		
Nevada	Sarah Chapman	Henderson	27	5'10"		Sister of Ellen Chapman, Miss California USA 2004
New Hampshire	LacyJane Folger	Farmington	22	5'6"		
New Jersey	Julianna White	Haddon Township	22	5'7"		Previously Miss New Jersey Teen USA 2006
New Mexico	Brittany Toll	Las Cruces	24	5'9"	Top 16 (Note: Voted per America's Choice internet/SMS)	Previously Miss New Mexico Teen USA 2005
New York	Amber Collins	Manhattan	26	5'9"	Top 16	
North Carolina	Brittany Leigh York	Wilmington	21	5'6"		
North Dakota	Brandi Schoenberg	Bismarck	26	5'10"		
Ohio	Ashley Caldwell	Gallipolis	24	5'8"		
Oklahoma	Kaitlyn Smith	Norman	22	5'9"		
Oregon	Anna Prosser	Portland	26	5'8"		Contestant at National Sweetheart 2008
Pennsylvania	Amber-Joi Watkins	Philadelphia	26	5'7"		
Rhode Island	Kate McCaughey	Lincoln	23	5'4"		
South Carolina	Courtney Hope Turner	North Augusta	21	5'7"	Top 8	
South Dakota	Chandra Burnham	Highmore	23	5'3"		
Tennessee	Ashley Durham	Adamsville	21	5'8"	1st runner-up	Previously Miss Tennessee Teen USA 2006
Texas	Ana Rodriguez	Laredo	25	5'8"	3rd runner-up	
Utah	Jamie Crandall	Salt Lake City	23	5'8"	Top 16	
Vermont	Lauren Carter	Burlington	21	5'8"		
Virginia	Nikki Poteet	Richmond	24	5'10"		
Washington	Angelina Kayyalaynen	Orchards	21	5'8"		
West Virginia	Whitney Veach	Petersburg	24	5'6"		Previously Miss West Virginia Teen USA 2003
Wisconsin	Jordan Morkin	Green Bay	21	5'4"		
Wyoming	Kaitlyn Davis	Laramie	20	5'9"		

== Television ratings ==
- In the first hour of the pageant, it earned NBC 6.6 million viewers, winning the timeslot. In the second hour, viewership rose to 7.8 million, also winning its timeslot. Both hours were the leader in the 18-49 demographic.
