= Hilary Cruz =

American actress, model and beauty queen

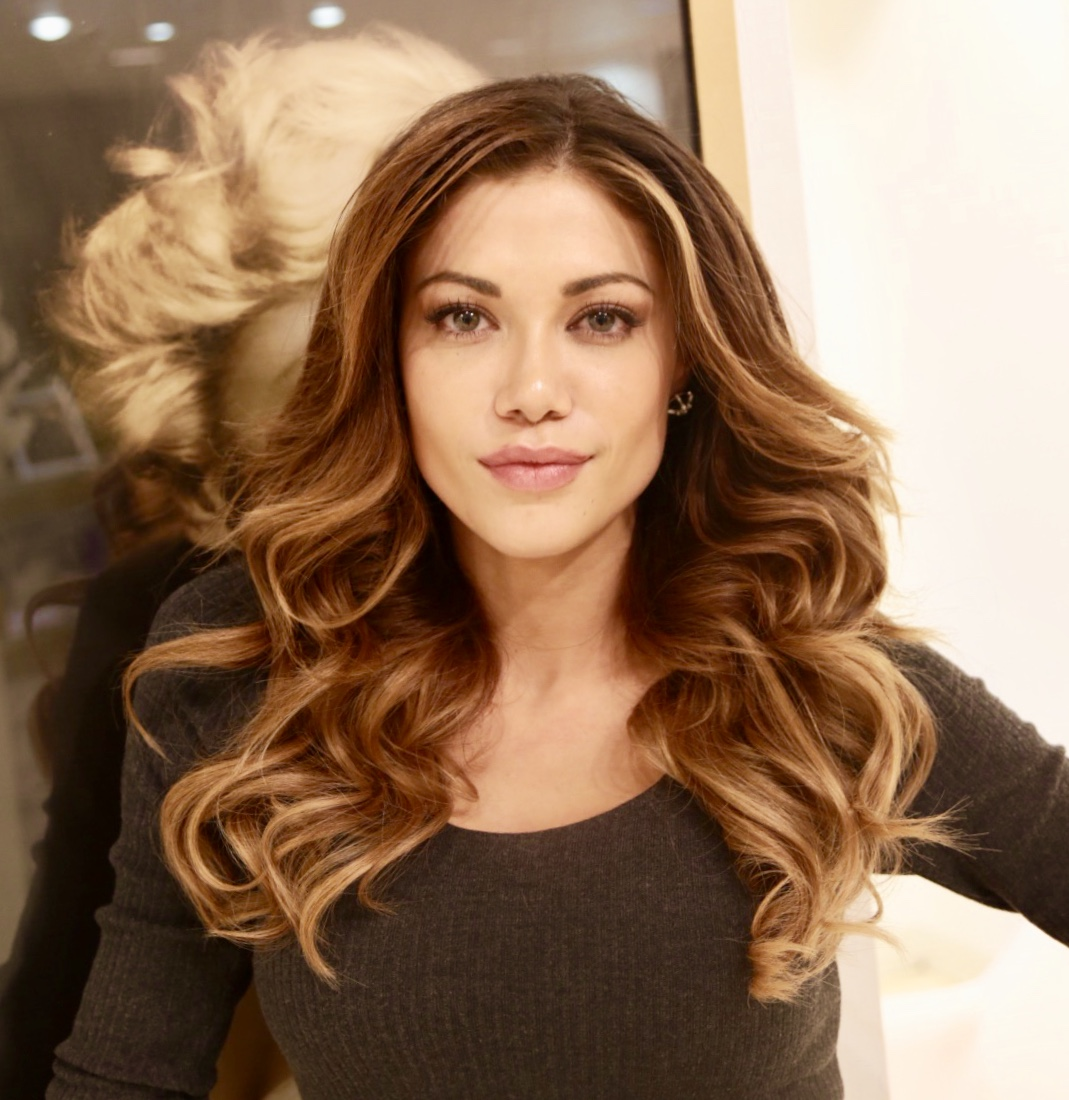
- Hilary Cruz in the lobby of the Grauman's Chinese Theatre
- Born: Hilary Carol Cruz; December 4, 1988 (age 37); Louisville, Colorado, U.S.
- Beauty pageant titleholder
- Title: Miss Colorado Teen USA 2007; Miss Teen USA 2007
- Hair color: Brown
- Eye color: Green
- Major competition: Miss Teen USA 2007 (Winner)

Hilary Carol Cruz (born December 4, 1988) is an American former actress, model and beauty queen who won Miss Teen USA 2007.

== Biography ==
Cruz is a former actress and model. She is also involved in producing television shows.

== Miss Colorado Teen USA ==
Hilary Cruz was crowned Miss Colorado Teen USA 2007 in 2006, gaining the right to represent the state of Colorado in the national televised pageant of Miss Teen USA 2007

== Miss Teen USA ==
In 2007, Cruz represented Colorado in the Miss Teen USA 2007 pageant held in Pasadena, California in August 2007. During the live television broadcast on August 24, 2007, Cruz was crowned Miss Teen USA 2007 by outgoing titleholder Katie Blair. She was the first titleholder from Colorado in the history of Miss Teen USA and Miss USA. She was the first titleholder from Colorado to place since 1998, and only the fourth to record a placement.

Awards and achievements
Preceded by (Montana) Katie Blair	Miss Teen USA; 2007	Succeeded by (Arkansas) Stevi Perry
Preceded by Blair Griffith	Miss Colorado Teen USA; 2007	Succeeded by Daniella Scimeca
