= Miss New Jersey Teen USA =

Beauty pageant competition

- Formation: 1983
- Type: Beauty pageant
- Headquarters: Newark
- Location: New Jersey
- Members: Miss Teen USA
- Official language: English
- Key people: Deborah Miller; Cindy Provost
- Website: Official website

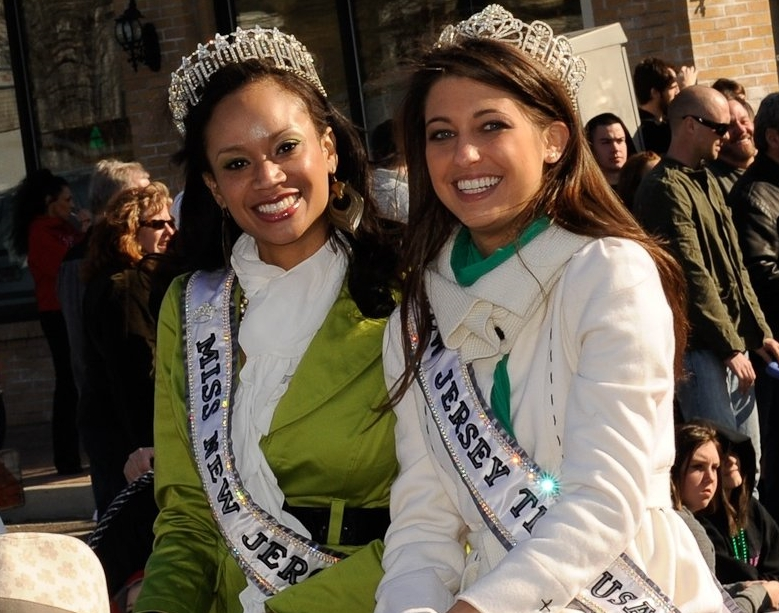
Chenoa Greene, Miss New Jersey USA 2010 and Erica Scymanski, Miss New Jersey Teen USA 2010 appearing in a St. Patrick's Day parade

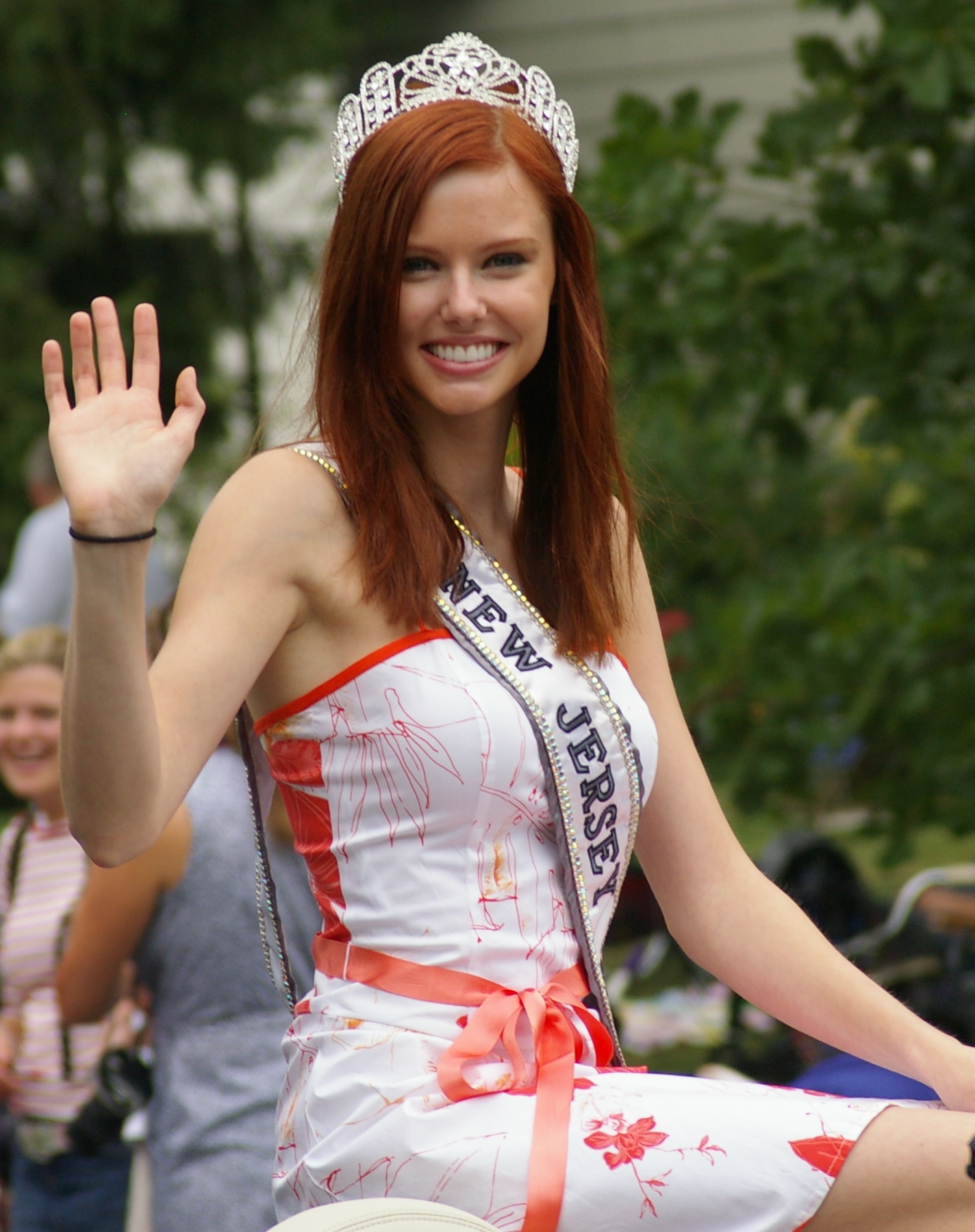
Alyssa Campanella, Miss New Jersey Teen USA 2007, first runner-up at Miss Teen USA 2007, Miss California USA 2011, and Miss USA 2011.

The Miss New Jersey Teen USA competition is the pageant that selects the representative for the state of New Jersey in the Miss Teen USA pageant.

New Jersey has had moderate success at Miss Teen USA, with twelve placements. In the first twenty years of the competition, New Jersey only recorded three placements; from 2003 they placed in four of five years. New Jersey's first top five placement came in 2003 when Jacklyn Pezzotta placed fourth runner-up, and this was bettered in 2007 when Alyssa Campanella placed 1st runner up.

UmaSofia Srivastava won Miss Teen USA 2023 on September 28, 2023, thus being the first teen from New Jersey to ever win the national title.

Three New Jersey teens (2001, 2006, and 2008) have held the Miss New Jersey USA title and competed at Miss USA. Alyssa Campanella, Miss New Jersey Teen USA 2007, competed twice for Miss New Jersey USA, but relocated to California and won Miss California USA and won the title of Miss USA 2011, the first former Miss New Jersey Teen USA titleholder to win Miss USA, regardless of the representing state.

Makenna Wayman of Newark was crowned Miss New Jersey Teen USA 2026 on July 26, 2026 at Hilton Parsippany Hotel in Parsipanny. She will represent New Jersey at Miss Teen USA 2026.

== Results summary ==
=== Placements ===
- Miss Teen USA: UmaSofia Srivastava (2023)
- 1st runners-up: Alyssa Campanella (2007)
- 4th runners-up: Jacklyn Pezzotta (2003), Valentina Sánchez (2014)
- Top 10: Rosalie Cuzo (1986), Michelle Knipfelberg (1988), Rachael Carrollo (2004), Julianna "Julie" White (2006), Oceane Qian-Feuillat (2025)
- Top 12: Kelli Paarz (1994)
- Top 15/16: Savannah Schechter (2011), Christina Thompson (2013), JaeLynn Polanco (2020)

New Jersey holds a record of 12 placements at Miss Teen USA.

=== Awards ===
- Miss Photogenic: Jacklyn Pezzotta (2003), Briahna Reinstein (2017), Ava Tortorici (2019)
- Miss Congeniality: Savannah Schechter (2011)
- Best State Costume: UmaSofia Srivastava (2023)

== Winners ==
Color key

- Declared as Winner
- Ended as runner-up
- Ended as one of the finalists or semifinalists

Year	Name	Hometown	Age^{1}	Local title	Placement at Miss Teen USA	Special awards at Miss Teen USA	Notes
2026	Makenna Wayman	Newark	16	Miss Chatham Teen			
2025	Oceane Qian-Feuillat	Jersey City	19	Miss Garden State Teen	Top 10		
2024	Julia Livolsi	Glen Rock	18	Miss Glen Rock Teen			
2023	Julia Carrano	Manahawkin	19		did not compete		Originally first runner-up, assumed the title when UmaSofia Srivastava won Miss Teen USA
2023	UmaSofia Srivastava	Morris Plains	15	Miss Morris County Teen	Miss Teen USA 2023	Best State Costume	
2022	Isabella Galan	Wayne	17				
2021	Delaney Musgrave	Lawrenceville	18				Eligible as a student of Lawrenceville School at the time of crowning
2020	JaeLynn Polanco	Bergenfield	16		Top 16		
2019	Ava Tortorici	Montclair	18				
2018	Diana Smerina	Freehold	16				
2017	Briahna Reinstein	Englishtown	16			Miss Photogenic	
2016	Gina Mellish	Oceanport	16				Later Miss New Jersey USA 2020; Top 10 at Miss USA 2020
2015	Jacqueline Giancola	East Brunswick	17				
2014	Valentina Sánchez	Spring Lake Heights	18		4th runner-up		Previously Miss Teen Model Venezuela 2011; Later competed Miss Venezuela 2020 represented Nueva Esparta, finished in Top 5; Later Miss Supranational Venezuela 2021
2013	Christina Thompson	Holmdel	16		Top 16		Daughter of Hallie Bonnell Thompson, Miss Ohio USA 1987; Later Miss Virginia USA 2021; Top 16 at Miss USA 2021
2012	Kendal Barrett	Montclair	15				
2011	Savannah Schechter	Far Hills	17		Top 15	Miss Congeniality	
2010	Erica Szymanski	Mt. Laurel	17				
2009	Alexa Brunetti	Brigantine	18				
2008	Michelle Leonardo	Tinton Falls	17				Miss Teen United States - World 2009; Later Miss New Jersey USA 2012; Top 10 at Miss USA 2012
2007	Alyssa Campanella	Manalapan	17		1st runner-up		Later Miss California USA 2011; Miss USA 2011
2006	Julianna "Julie" White	Haddon Township	17		Top 10		Later Miss New Jersey USA 2011
2005	Regina Villano	Tabernacle	18				Host of Solo Generation & Linerocket Live. Actress on All my Children & Guiding Light, Appeared on Reality Show " True Beauty " season 2
2004	Rachael Carrollo	Wantage	17		Top 10		
2003	Jacklyn Pezzotta	Little Egg Harbor	17		4th runner-up	Miss Photogenic	2nd runner-up to Miss New Jersey USA 2007 & 2008
2002	Sheri Drach	National Park	15				Contestant at National Sweetheart 2006
2001	Erin Abrahamson	Essex Fells	17				1st runner-up at Miss New Jersey USA 2007 and assumed the title after the original winner Ashley Harder disqualified due to pageant rules, later crowned Miss New Jersey USA 2007 & Mrs. New Jersey 2015
2000	Ulrica Udani	Marmora	18				
1999	Nicole Marie Golas	Deptford Township	19				
1998	Melissa Dungao	Princeton	17				
1997	Lauren Petty	Point Pleasant	19				
1996	Jessica Ponzo	Williamstown	15				Youngest Contestant at Miss Teen USA 1996
1995	Joyce Houseknecht	Deptford	18				
1994	Kelli Paarz	Linwood	18		Semi-finalist		Sister of Kerri Paarz, Miss New Jersey Teen USA 1991, Later Miss New Jersey USA 1998
1993	Heather Brenner	Absecon	19				
1992	Lori Schmidt	Haledon	16				
1991	Kerri Paarz	Linwood	17				Sister of Kelli Paarz, Miss New Jersey Teen USA 1994
1990	Jennifer Giordano	Bedminster	17				
1989	Yvonne Christiano	Parsippany	18				
1988	Michelle Knipfelberg	Edison	18		Semi-finalist		
1987	Tara Eldridge	Voorhees	18				
1986	Rosalie Cuzo	Colts Neck	17		Semi-finalist		
1985	Sharon Turner	Beachwood	17				
1984	Tracy Grennon	Wyckoff	18				
1983	Sheri Drummond	Lake Hiawatha	17				

^{1} Age at the time of the Miss Teen USA pageant
