= Miss Teen USA 2011 =

29th edition of the Miss Teen USA competition

- Date: July 16, 2011
- Presenters: Chet Buchanan; Allie LaForce
- Entertainment: Kia Hampton
- Venue: Grand Ballroom, Atlantis Paradise Island, Nassau, The Bahamas
- Broadcaster: Ustream
- Entrants: 51
- Placements: 15
- Winner: Danielle Doty; Texas
- Congeniality: Savannah Schechter; New Jersey
- Photogenic: Courtney Coleman; Hawaii

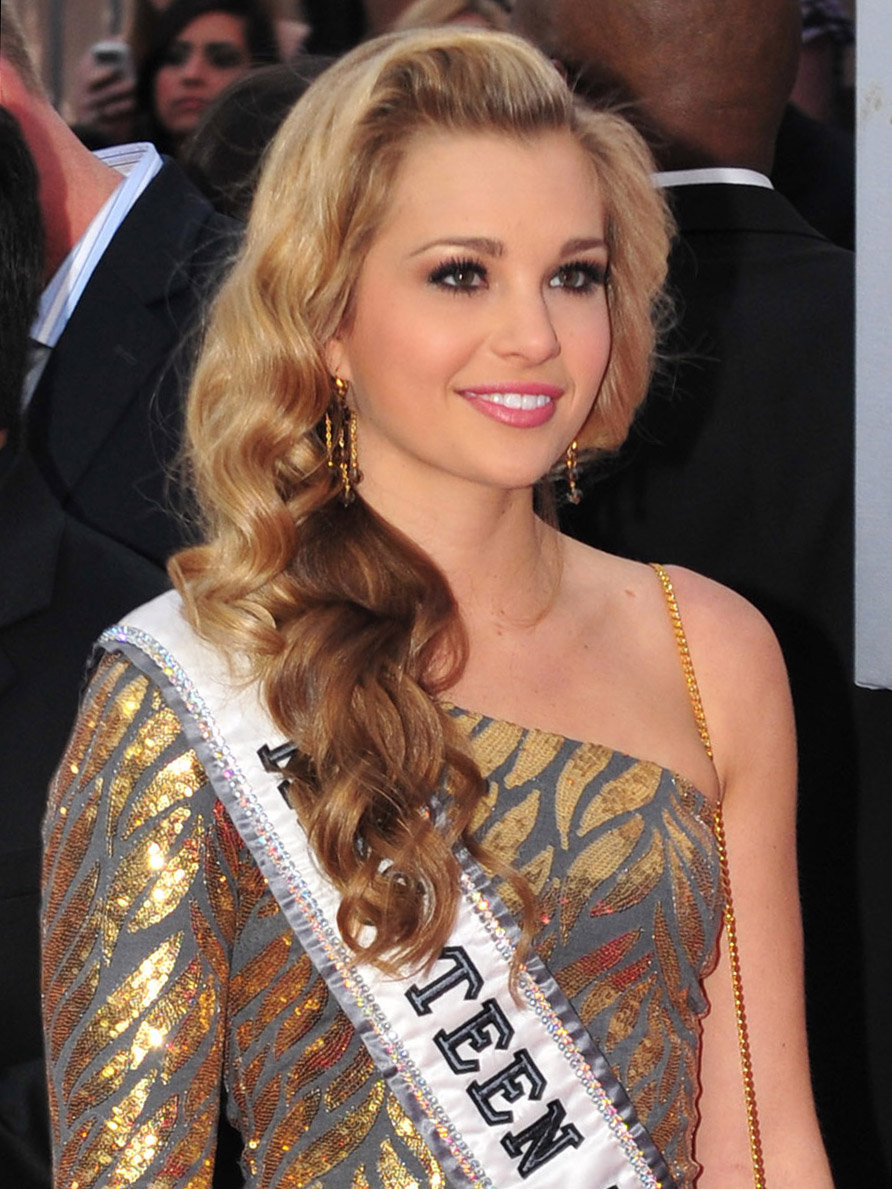
Danielle Doty -Miss Teen UAS winner 2011

Miss Teen USA 2011 was the 29th Miss Teen USA pageant. It was held at the Grand Ballroom, Atlantis Paradise Island, Nassau, The Bahamas on July 16, 2011. Miss Teen USA 2010, Kamie Crawford, crowned her successor, Danielle Doty of Texas, as Miss Teen USA 2011 at the end of this event. The 50 states and the District of Columbia competed for the prestigious title. For the first time, viewers were allowed to vote for their favorite opening dress and swimsuit designed by the official sponsors, Sherri Hill and Kooey Australia. People's Choice along with Miss Universe Organization created an online poll for selecting Miss Teen USA Photogenic, won by Courtney Coleman of Hawaii. Savannah Schechter of New Jersey, won the Miss Congeniality award at the pageant.

For the first time ever, both the preliminary competition and the final show were webcast live via UStream and NewTek on www.missteenusa.com and seventeen.com. The preliminary competition took place of July 15 and was hosted by Chet Buchanan and Kamie Crawford. The final show was hosted by Chet Buchanan and Allie LaForce, Miss Teen USA 2005. Kia Hampton, Miss Kentucky USA 2011, provided entertainment by singing at the show.

== Results ==
=== Placements ===
Placement	Contestant
Miss Teen USA 2011	Texas – Danielle Doty
1st Runner-Up	North Dakota – Audra Mari
2nd Runner-Up	California – Alexis Swanstrom
3rd Runner-Up	Kansas – Taylor Clark
4th Runner-Up	Missouri – Sydnee Stottlemyre
Top 15	Colorado – Caley-Rae Pavillard; Georgia – Kristen Robinson; Indiana – Jessica Buch; Maine – Alexis Mcilwain; Maryland – Kirsten Nicholson; Minnesota – Hannah Corbett; New Jersey – Savannah Schechter; Pennsylvania – Madison Longstreth; South Carolina – Keyla Childs; West Virginia – Susan King

=== Special awards ===
- Miss Congeniality: New Jersey - Savannah Schechter
- Miss Photogenic: Hawaii - Courtney Coleman

== Delegates ==
State	Name	Hometown	Age	Placement	Awards	Notes
Alabama	Barron Rae Williams	Dadeville	16			Later 1st runner-up at Miss Alabama USA 2016; Later 2nd runner-up at Miss Alabama USA 2017; Later Top 15 semifinalist at Miss Florida USA 2019
Alaska	Denali Whiting	Kotzebue	19			
Arizona	Molly Argue	Paradise Valley	18			
Arkansas	Mary-Kate Hartley	Hamburg	17			
California	Alexis Swanstrom	San Diego	17	2nd runner-up		Later 3rd runner-up at Miss California USA 2014
Colorado	Caley-Rae Pavillard	Castle Rock	17	Top 15		Previously Miss Colorado's Outstanding Teen 2008; Later Miss Colorado USA 2016
Connecticut	Samantha Sojka	North Granby	19			Later Miss New Hampshire USA 2026
Delaware	Amanda Debus	Middletown	18			Previously Miss Delaware's Outstanding Teen 2008; Later Miss Delaware 2016; Later 3rd runner-up at Miss Delaware USA 2018; Later 1st runner-up at Miss Delaware USA 2019
District of Columbia	Imani Bentham	Washington	19			
Florida	Mikyle Crockett	Jacksonville	18			
Georgia	Kristen Robinson	Stone Mountain	17	Top 15		Later top 15 semifinalist at Miss Georgia USA 2014; Later 4th runner-up at Miss Georgia USA 2016
Hawaii	Courtney Coleman	Moanalua	17		Miss Photogenic	
Idaho	Claira Hollingsworth	Preston	18			Later Miss Idaho USA 2015
Illinois	Paige Higgerson	Cutler	19			
Indiana	Jessica Buch	Bedford	16	Top 15		
Iowa	Richelle Orr	Hampton	19			Later Miss Iowa USA 2013
Kansas	Taylor Clark	Topeka	17	3rd runner-up		Previously National American Miss Preteen 2006
Kentucky	Stephanie Jones	Elizabethtown	18			
Louisiana	Elizabeth Heinen	Eunice	16			
Maine	Alexis McIlwain	Saco	15	Top 15		
Maryland	Kirsten Nicholson	Sykesville	18	Top 15		Later 1st runner-up at Miss Maryland USA 2016
Massachusetts	Kay Tetreault	South Hadley	18			
Michigan	Taylor Sherman	Dearborn Heights	17			
Minnesota	Hannah Corbett	Excelsior	17	Top 15		Later 3rd runner-up at Miss Minnesota USA 2015; Later 3rd runner-up at Miss Minnesota USA 2016; Later 3rd runner-up at Miss Minnesota USA 2017
Mississippi	Sarah Bobo	Corinth	19			
Missouri	Sydnee Stottlemyre	Wildwood	17	4th runner-up		Previously Miss Missouri's Outstanding Teen 2008 and 4th runner-up at Miss America's Outstanding Teen 2009; Later Miss Missouri USA 2016 and top 10 at Miss USA 2016
Montana	Sibahn Doxey	Frenchtown	18			Later Miss Montana USA 2016
Nebraska	Madison Novak	Lincoln	17			Later 3rd runner-up at Miss Nebraska USA 2015; Later 3rd runner-up at Miss Nebraska USA 2016; Later 2nd runner-up at Miss Nebraska USA 2017
Nevada	Ashley Brown	Las Vegas	17			
New Hampshire	Annie Read	Sandwich	17			
New Jersey	Savannah Schechter	Far Hills	17	Top 15	Miss Congeniality	Later 2x semifinalist at Miss New Jersey USA; Later top 15 at Miss Nevada USA 2020
New Mexico	Alexa Castle	Albuquerque	18			
New York	Lisa Drouillard	New York City	19			Later Miss Universe Haiti 2015
North Carolina	Vanessa McClelland	Fayetteville	19			
North Dakota	Audra Mari	Fargo	17	1st runner-up		Later Miss North Dakota USA 2014 and 1st runner-up at Miss USA 2014; Later Miss World America 2016
Ohio	Morgan Smigel	Avon	16			
Oklahoma	Alma Sandoval	Oklahoma City	18			Later 2x top 15 semifinalist at Miss Oklahoma USA
Oregon	Kayla Roush	Scio	18			
Pennsylvania	Madison Longstreth	Spring Grove	16	Top 15		Originally first runner-up but assumed the title after winner Deana Chuzhinina resigned for certain reasons; Later 3rd runner-up at Miss Pennsylvania USA 2017; Later 1st runner-up at Miss Pennsylvania USA 2018
Rhode Island	Lindsey Bucci	Scituate	18			Later 2nd runner-up at Miss Rhode Island USA 2017; Later 2nd runner-up at Miss Rhode Island USA 2019
South Carolina	Keyla Childs	Summerville	17	Top 15		Later 3rd runner-up at Miss South Carolina USA 2014; Later top 15 semifinalist at Miss South Carolina USA 2017
South Dakota	Lexy Schenk	Irene	17			Later Miss South Dakota USA 2015
Tennessee	Kaitlin White	Nashville	18			Later top 15 semifinalist at Miss Tennessee USA 2021
Texas	Danielle Doty	Harlingen	18	Miss Teen USA 2011		Later top 18 semifinalist at Miss Texas USA 2018
Utah	Maquel Knight	Salt Lake City	17			
Vermont	Bridget Martin	Stowe	15			
Virginia	Susie Evans	Poquoson	17			Later Miss Virginia USA 2020; Later winner of season 26 of The Bachelor
Washington	Cheyenne Van Tine	Kennewick	17			
West Virginia	Susan King	Fairmont	16	Top 15		
Wisconsin	Victoria Sorone Johnston	Eau Claire	19			Later 4th runner-up at Miss Wisconsin USA 2013; Later 1st runner-up at Miss Wisconsin USA 2014; Later 4th runner-up at Miss Wisconsin USA 2015
Wyoming	Ashley Golden	Gillette	17			Previously Miss Wyoming's Outstanding Teen 2007

== Replacements ==
- Pennsylvania - Deana Chuzhinina was originally Miss Pennsylvania Teen USA 2011 but resigned for unknown reasons. Madison Longstreth, the 1st runner up, replaced her.

== Judges ==
- Dr. Cheryl Karcher
- BJ Coleman
- Lora Flaugh
- Fred Nelson
- Vinnie Potestivo
- Katherine Schwarzenegger
- Michelle Wiltshire

== Entertainment ==
- Kia Hampton, Miss Kentucky USA 2011
