= Miss West Virginia Teen USA =

Beauty pageant competition

- Formation: 1983
- Type: Beauty pageant
- Headquarters: Buckhannon
- Location: West Virginia
- Members: Miss Teen USA
- Official language: English
- Website: Official Website

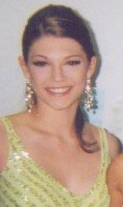
Chelsea Welch, Miss West Virginia Teen USA 2007

The Miss West Virginia Teen USA competition is the pageant that selects the representative for the state of West Virginia in the Miss Teen USA pageant. This pageant is independently conducted and produced by Empower2 Productions LLC. and is formerly directed by Sanders & Associates, Inc., dba- Pageant Associates based in Buckhannon, West Virginia.

Despite a relatively strong start in the 1980s, with two semi-finals finishes, no Miss West Virginia Teen USA placed from 1988 to 2005, when Andrea Turner placed 2nd runner-up to Allie LaForce of Ohio. After this, West Virginia had more success with more placements in 2007, 2011, 2012, 2013, 2014, 2017, 2018 and 2024.

Four Miss West Virginia Teen USA's have also won the Miss West Virginia USA title and competed at Miss USA.

Gracia Knight of Beckley was crowned Miss West Virginia Teen USA 2026 on June 13, 2026 at The Culture Center • West Virginia State Capitol Complex in Charleston. She will represent West Virginia at Miss Teen USA 2026.

== Results summary ==
=== Placements ===
- 1st runner-up: Elizabeth Sabatino (2012)
- 2nd runners-up: Andrea Turner (2005), Haley Holloway (2013)
- 4th runners-up: Chelsea Welch (2007), Olivia Travis (2024)
- Top 10: Jodi Caldwell (1986), Wendy Stephens (1988)
- Top 15: Susan Hines King (2011), Lexsey Marrara (2014), Olivia Hutchison (2017), Trinity Tiffany (2018)
- Top 20: Gracia Knight (2026)

West Virginia holds a record of 12 placements at Miss Teen USA.

=== Awards ===
- Miss Congeniality: Cora King (2015)
- Best State Costume: Kelly Porterfield (1985)

== Winners ==
- Declared as Winner
- Ended as runner-up
- Ended as one of the finalists or semifinalists

Year	Name	Hometown	Age^{1}	Local title	Placement at Miss Teen USA	Special awards at Miss Teen USA	Notes
2026	Gracia Knight	Beckley	18	Miss Mountain State Teen	Top 20		
2025	Baylee Jarret	Richwood	19	Miss Pumpkin Festival Teen			
2024	Olivia Travis	Gerrardstown	19	Miss Barboursville Fall Festival Teen	4th Runner-up		Previously Miss West Virginia’s Outstanding Teen 2021
2023	Lakyn Campbell	Parkersburg	18	Miss Parkersburg Teen			
2022	Emma Kitchen	Buckhannon	18	Miss Williamstown Teen			
2021	Brylee Knotts	Grafton	18	Miss Three Rivers Festival Teen			
2020	Sophia Isabella Martino	Bridgeport	17				
2019	Brennah Groves	Summersville	17				
2018	Trinity Tiffany	Huntington	16		Top 15		
2017	Olivia Hutchison	Huntington	18		Top 15		
2016	Cassy Trickett	St. Marys	18				
2015	Cora King	Hurricane	16			Miss Congeniality	
2014	Lexsey Marrara	Morgantown	17		Top 15		
2013	Haley Holloway	Morgantown	17		2nd runner-up		Later Miss West Virginia USA 2019
2012	Elizabeth Sabatino	Morgantown	16		1st runner-up		
2011	Susan Hines King	Fairmont	16		Top 15		
2010	Ally Grace Brandfass	Morgantown	16				
2009	Alysia Thompson	Ripley	16				
2008	Micah Michael	Morgantown	17				
2007	Chelsea Welch	West Union	16		4th runner-up		Later Miss West Virginia USA 2013; Top 15 at Miss USA 2013
2006	Lora Gallagher	Bridgeport	18				
2005	Andrea Turner	Benwood	17		2nd runner-up		
2004	Mary Ellen Wolfe	Huntington	18				Daughter of Mrs. America 1984- Deborah Wolfe
2003	Whitney Veach	Petersburg	16				Later Miss West Virginia USA 2011
2002	Heather Estep	Hurricane	18				
2001	Tara Szersen	Wheeling	17				
2000	Ginneene Barone	Charleston	18				
1999	Carrie Anne Fleshman	Pinch/Charleston	16				
1998	Erica Bevins	Huntington	18				
1997	Amanda Burns	Charleston	17				Later Miss West Virginia USA 1999 and Mrs. West Virginia America 2004 under her married name, Amanda Duffy.
1996	Heather Gray	Charleston	16				
1995	Sarah Russell	Hurricane	15				
1994	Jonelle Spiker	Charleston	17				
1993	Jennifer Pringle	Charleston	19				
1992	Kelly Humphreys	Charleston	15				
1991	Tracey Rexroad	Weston	18				
1990	Mindy Green	Buckhannon	18				
1989	Jennifer Dunn	Buckhannon	18				
1988	Wendy Stephens	Parkersburg	18		Top 10		
1987	Cheryl Cullop	Beckley	17				
1986	Jodi Caldwell	Nitro	15		Top 10		
1985	Kelly Porterfield	Martinsburg	16			Best State Costume	
1984	Trina Vertillo	Richwood	15				
1983	Kay Scadden	Newell	17				

^{1} Age at the time of the Miss Teen USA pageant
