= Miss Colorado Teen USA =

Beauty pageant competition

- Formation: 1983
- Type: Beauty pageant
- Headquarters: Savage
- Location: Minnesota
- Members: Miss Teen USA
- Official language: English
- Website: Official website

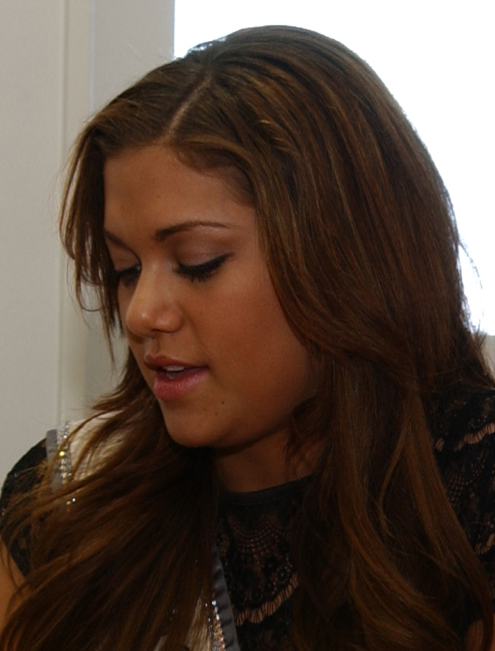
Hilary Cruz, Miss Colorado Teen USA 2007 and Colorado's only Miss Teen USA

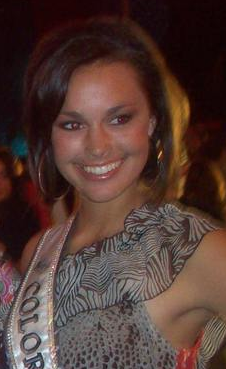
Danielle Scimeca, Miss Colorado Teen USA 2008

The Miss Colorado Teen USA competition is the pageant that selects the representative for the state of Colorado in the Miss Teen USA pageant. From 1993 to 2006, the Miss Colorado Teen USA state pageant was directed by Carol Hirata and the Carlton Group, based in Bellvue, Colorado. In 2007, it was taken over by Future Productions, based in Savage, Minnesota, which also directs pageants in Iowa, Minnesota, North Dakota, South Dakota, Wisconsin and Wyoming. The pageant have been held in Loveland, Greeley and other cities.

One of Colorado's semi-finalists was Katee Doland, a Triple Crown winner. She is one of three Miss Colorado Teen USA titleholders to win the Miss Colorado USA crown. Morgan O'Murray, Miss Colorado Teen USA 1999, also won the Miss Colorado state title for the Miss America pageant in 2000.

Sophia Cespedes of Brighton was appointed Miss Colorado Teen USA on July 30th, 2026 after the open casting call from Thomas Brodeur, the new owner of the national pageant. She will represent Colorado at Miss Teen USA 2026.

== Results summary ==
=== Placements ===
- Miss Teen USA: Hilary Cruz (2007)
- 2nd runner-up : Chloe Zambrano (2018)
- Top 10/12: Shalon Pecosky (1990), Amanda Aardsma (1997), Katee Doland (1998)
- Top 15: Danielle Scimeca (2008), Caley-Rae Pavillard (2011)

Colorado holds a record of 7 placements at Miss Teen USA.

=== Awards ===
- Miss Congeniality: Blair Griffith (2006)
- Style Award: Morgan O'Murray (1999)

== Winners ==
- Declared as Winner
- Ended as runner-up
- Ended as one of the finalists or semifinalists

| Year | Name | Hometown | Age^{1} | Local title | Placement at Miss Teen USA | Special awards at Miss Teen USA | Notes |
|---|---|---|---|---|---|---|---|
| 2026 | Sophia Cespedes | Brighton | 18 | | | | |
| 2025 | Savannah Wilson | Houston, TX | 18 | | | | |
| 2024 | Reece Revious | Cherry Creek | TBA | Miss Cherry Creek Teen | | | |
| 2023 | Grace Covney | Highlands Ranch | 19 | Miss Highlands Ranch Teen | | | |
| 2022 | Chloe Fisher | Sterling | 17 | Miss Logan County Teen | | | |
| 2021 | Abigail "Abi" Lange | Longmont | 19 | Miss Longmont Teen | | | |
| 2020 | Yasaswini "Yashi" Uppalapati | Colorado Springs | 18 | | | | |
| 2019 | Sydney Boehler | Fort Collins | 18 | | | | |
| 2018 | Chloe Dru Zambrano | Fruita | 18 | | 2nd Runner-Up | | |
| 2017 | Alexis Glover | Colorado Springs | 18 | | | | Later Miss Colorado USA 2022 |
| 2016 | Alexis Wynne | Castle Pines | 17 | | | | |
| 2015 | Taylor Kelly | Castle Rock | 17 | | | | |
| 2014 | Cindy Yan | Denver | 16 | | | | |
| 2013 | Chloe Reece Brown | Grand Junction | 18 | | | | Later Miss Colorado USA 2018 |
| 2012 | Jacqueline Zuccherino | Aurora | 17 | | | | |
| 2011 | Caley-Rae Pavillard | Castle Rock | 17 | | Top 15 | | Previously Miss Colorado's Outstanding Teen 2008; Later Miss Colorado USA 2016 |
| 2010 | Courtney Carter | Thornton | 18 | | | | |
| 2009 | Taylor Schettler | Castle Rock | 16 | | | | |
| 2008 | Danielle Scimeca | Fort Collins | 18 | | Top 15 | | |
| 2007 | Hilary Cruz | Louisville | 18 | | Miss Teen USA 2007 | | |
| 2006 | Blair Griffith | Morrison | 18 | | | Miss Congeniality | Later Miss Colorado USA 2011. |
| 2005 | Paige Williams | Durango | 17 | | | | |
| 2004 | Tori Carter | Greeley | 19 | | | | National Junior Olympic champion in inline speed skating, 1st runner up in Miss Teen America 2002 |
| 2003 | Karis Donahue | Allenspark | 18 | | | | |
| 2002 | Lindsey Dowling | Littleton | | | | | |
| 2001 | Krystal Spurr | Lafayette | | | | | |
| 2000 | Shannon Herndon | Thornton | | | | | |
| 1999 | Morgan O'Murray | Colorado Springs | 17 | | | Style award | Later Miss Colorado 2002.; Former Denver Broncos cheerleader. |
| 1998 | Katee Doland | Arvada | 18 | | Top 10 | | Triple Crown winner: Later Miss Colorado USA 2001; Miss Colorado 2003; Former Denver Broncos cheerleader; Current publicist for the Miss Colorado pageant and director of the Miss Colorado's Outstanding Teen pageant under her married name, Katee Mink |
| 1997 | Amanda C. Aardsma | Englewood | 17 | | Top 10 | | Sister of Major League Baseball player David Aardsma |
| 1996 | Ara Francis | Westminster | | | | | |
| 1995 | Melissa Schuster | Aurora | | | | | |
| 1994 | Angelia "Angie" Payne | Littleton | | | | | |
| 1993 | Susie Garifi | Thornton | | | | | |
| 1992 | Brandi Bryant | Littleton | | | | | |
| 1991 | Kiki Moracall | Denver | | | | | |
| 1990 | Shalon Pecosky | Denver | 15 | | Semi-finalist | | Later Mrs. Colorado America 2010 and Top 6 at Mrs. America 2011 under her married name, Shalon Polson. |
| 1989 | Jana Durbin | Golden | | | | | Later Miss Colorado USA 1993 |
| 1988 | Leah Crawford | Greeley | | | | | |
| 1987 | Nicki Anselmo | Denver | | | | | |
| 1986 | Rayanne Durkee | Northglenn | | | | | |
| 1985 | Debbie James | Denver | 17 | | | | Later Miss Colorado USA 1989; Top 10 at Miss USA 1989; Winner of Miss Oktoberfest 1989 |
| 1984 | Timi Rouse | Fort Collins | | | | | |
| 1983 | Julie Evelyn Meyer | Brighton | 18 | | | | Came close to disqualification for being five days older than eligibility rules allowed but was allowed to compete. |

^{1} Age at the time of the Miss Teen USA pageant
