= 2026 Little League Softball World Series qualification =

Softball Tournament

There were twelve Little League softball regional tournaments to qualify for the 2026 Little League Softball World Series in Greenville, North Carolina, in which they all took place in between June 12 and July 28, 2026.

== Qualified teams ==
Region	Location	Little League
Asia-Pacific	Sangō, Japan	Kinki Softball Little League
Canada	(Canada) Repentigny, Quebec	On Field LLS Little League
Central	Owensboro, Kentucky	Daviess County Little League
Europe-Africa	Bologna, Italy	Emilia Romagna Little League
Host (North Carolina)	Clayton, North Carolina	Johnston County Little League
Latin America	Guayama, Puerto Rico	Guayama Softball Little League
Mid-Atlantic	Toms River, New Jersey	Toms River Little League
New England	Bristol, Connecticut	Bristol Girls Softball Little League
Northwest	(Washington (state)) Snohomish, Washington	Snohomish Little League
Southeast	Lake Mary, Florida	Lake Mary Little League
Southwest	Helotes, Texas	Greater Helotes Little League
West	Live Oak, California	Live Oak Little League

== United States tournaments ==
=== Central region ===
The tournament took place in Whitestown, Indiana from July 17–22, 2026.

State	Location	Little League
Illinois	Elmhurst	Elmhurst Youth Baseball Little League
Indiana	Floyds Knobs	Floyds Knobs Community Club Little League
Iowa	Johnston	Johnston Little League
Kentucky	Owensboro	Daviess County Little League
Michigan	St. Clair	St. Clair Little League
Minnesota	St. Charles	St. Charles South Little League
Missouri	Columbia	Daniel Boone Little League
Nebraska	Omaha	Keystone Little League
Ohio	Wheelersburg	Wheelersburg Little League
Wisconsin	Appleton	Appleton Little League

==== Bracket ====
Winner's First Round	Winner's Second Round	Winner's Semifinal	Winner's Final	Championship Game
Ohio	0
Nebraska	1	Illinois	5
Illinois	5
Illinois	11
Kentucky	6
Kentucky	3
Michigan	1
Kentucky	2
Indiana	3
Minnesota	1
Wisconsin	2	Iowa	0
Minnesota	0
Iowa	3
Indiana	8
Missouri	3
Indiana	4	Indiana	0
Kentucky	1
Elimination First Round	Elimination Second Round	Elimination Quarterfinal	Elimination Semifinal	Elimination Final
Minnesota	6
Ohio	1	Michigan	4	Kentucky	6
Michigan	8	Michigan	3	Minnesota	0	Missouri	1
Wisconsin	0	Missouri	5
Illinois	0
Iowa	1	Missouri	1
Nebraska	2	Missouri	13
Missouri	6

=== Host region (North Carolina) ===
The North Carolina state tournament took place in Clayton, North Carolina from July 6–10. The winner of the North Carolina state tournament advances to the Little League Softball World Series representing the Host Region. The winner of the elimination bracket advances to the Southeast region tournament as the North Carolina Representative.

District	Location	Little League
District 1	Forest City	Forest City Little League
District 2	Salisbury	Rowan County Little League
District 3	Charlotte	Mallard Creek Little League
District 4	Winterville	Pitt County Girls Softball Little League
District 5	Murphy	Blue Ridge Mountains Little League
District 6	Clayton	Johnston County Little League

==== Winner's bracket ====
First Round
(North Carolina) Pitt County	15
(North Carolina) Mallard Creek	0
(North Carolina) Johnston County	10
(North Carolina) Blue Ridge	0

Semifinals
(North Carolina) Rowan County	4
(North Carolina) Pitt County	1
(North Carolina) Forest City	0
(North Carolina) Johnston County	16

Championship Game
(North Carolina) Rowan County	0
(North Carolina) Johnston County	6

==== Elimination Bracket ====
First Round
(North Carolina) Mallard Creek	15
(North Carolina) Forest City	1
(North Carolina) Blue Ridge	0
(North Carolina) Pitt County	10

Semifinal
(North Carolina) Mallard Creek	0
(North Carolina) Pitt County	10

Bracket Final
(North Carolina) Pitt County	6
(North Carolina) Rowan County	2

=== Mid-Atlantic region ===
The tournament is taking place in Bristol, Connecticut from July 18–23.

State	Location	Little League
Delaware	Middletown	MOT Little League
Maryland	Delmar	Delmar Little League
New Jersey	Toms River	Toms River Little League
(New York (state)) New York	Massapequa Park	Massapequa International Little League
Pennsylvania	Minersville	Minersville Little League
(Washington, D.C.) Washington, D.C.	Washington, D.C.	Mamie Johnson Little League

==== Bracket ====
Winner's First Round
(Washington, D.C.) Washington, DC	1
New Jersey	11
Pennsylvania	10
(New York (state)) New York	2
Elimination First Round
(Washington, D.C.) Washington, DC	1
Maryland	9
(New York (state)) New York	4
Delaware	3

Winner's Semifinal
Delaware	1
New Jersey	5
Maryland	0
Pennsylvania	7
Elimination Semifinal
Maryland	4
(New York (state)) New York	7

Winner's Bracket Final
New Jersey	2
Pennsylvania	3
Elimination Bracket Final
New Jersey	3
(New York (state)) New York	2

Championship Game
Pennsylvania	3
New Jersey	5

=== New England region ===
The tournament is taking place in Bristol, Connecticut from July 18–23.

State	Location	Little League
Connecticut	Bristol	Bristol Girls Softball Little League
Maine	Gorham	Gorham Little League
Massachusetts	Worcester	Jesse Burkett Little League
New Hampshire	Concord	Concord National Youth Softball Little League
Rhode Island	Cranston	Cranston Western Little League
Vermont	St. Albans	Champlain Little League

==== Bracket ====
Winner's First Round
Maine	13
Massachusetts	3
New Hampshire	0
Vermont	15
Elimination First Round
Massachusetts	5
Vermont	6
New Hampshire	1
Maine	17

Winner's Semifinal
Connecticut	4
Maine	1
Rhode Island	15
Vermont	0
Elimination Semifinal
Vermont	0
Maine	10

Winner's Bracket Final
Connecticut	11
Rhode Island	1
Elimination Bracket Final
Rhode Island	11
Maine	1

Championship Game
Connecticut	4
Rhode Island	3

=== Northwest region ===
The tournament is taking place in San Bernardino, California from July 18–23.

State	Location	Little League
Alaska	Soldotna	Soldotna Little League
Colorado	Monument	Tri Lakes Little League
Idaho	Boise	Northwest Ada Little League
Montana	Missoula	Garden City Softball Little League
Oregon	Hermiston	Hermiston Little League
(Washington (state)) Washington	Snohomish	Snohomish Little League

==== Bracket ====
Winner's First Round
Colorado	16
Alaska	0
Montana	1
Oregon	2
Elimination First Round
Alaska	5
Oregon	10
Montana	14
Colorado	2

Winner's Semifinal
Idaho	10
Colorado	6
(Washington (state)) Washington	2
Oregon	0
Elimination Semifinal
Oregon	1
Montana	2

Winner's Bracket Final
Idaho	0
(Washington (state)) Washington	6
Elimination Bracket Final
Idaho	8
Montana	0

Championship Game
(Washington (state)) Washington	11
Idaho	3

=== Southeast Region ===
The tournament took place in Warner Robins, Georgia from July 17–22.

State	Location	Little League
Alabama	Mountain Brook	Mountain Brook Little League
Florida	Lake Mary	Lake Mary Little League
(Georgia (U.S. state)) Georgia	Warner Robins	Warner Robbins American Little League
North Carolina	Winterville	Pitt County Girls Softball Little League
South Carolina	Taylors	Northwood Little League
Tennessee	Lebanon	Lebanon Kiwanis Little League
Virginia	Yorktown	York County Little League
West Virginia	Logan	Logan Little League

==== Bracket ====
Winner's First Round	Winner's Second Round	Winner's Bracket Final	Championship Game
South Carolina	11
West Virginia	0
South Carolina	5
Florida	10
Florida	11
(Georgia (U.S. state)) Georgia	3
Florida	3
North Carolina	2
Virginia	5
Tennessee	2
Virginia	0
North Carolina	14
North Carolina	18
Alabama	0	Florida	3
North Carolina	1
Elimination First Round	Elimination Second Round	Elimination Semifinal	Elimination Bracket Final
Virginia	3
West Virginia	2	(Georgia (U.S. state)) Georgia	5	North Carolina	6
(Georgia (U.S. state)) Georgia	4	(Georgia (U.S. state)) Georgia	7	(Georgia (U.S. state)) Georgia	5
South Carolina	6
South Carolina	3
Tennessee	19	Tennessee	1
Alabama	1

=== Southwest region ===
The tournament took place in Waco, Texas from July 18–21.

State	Location	Little League
Louisiana	Kenner	Eastbank Little League
New Mexico	Carlsbad	Carlsbad National Little League
Oklahoma	Tulsa	Tulsa National Little League
Texas East	Inez	Industrial Little League
Texas West	Helotes	Greater Helotes Little League

==== Oklahoma disqualification ====
During the regional tournament, official complaints were filed by the leagues representing Louisiana, Texas East, and Texas West alleging that the Oklahoma representative, Tulsa National Little League, had violated Little League rules related to player eligibility and required regular season play. Similar allegations were lodged against Tulsa National Little League the previous year, when they finished in 3rd place at the 2025 Little League Softball World Series. On July 21, Little League International issued a statement announcing that Tulsa National Little League had been disqualified from the Little League Softball tournament and "determined that the adult volunteers and parents did not provide sufficient documentation to verify that all players are eligible to participate in the International Tournament based on either their school enrollment or bona fide habitation within the league's official boundaries."

As a result, Oklahoma's 10-1 semifinal win over Louisiana was ruled a forfeit, and Louisiana and Texas West were elevated to the regional championship game.

==== Bracket ====
Winner's First Round
Texas East	0
Texas West	2
Elimination First Round
Texas East	5
New Mexico	4

Winner's Semifinal
Oklahoma	6
Texas West	1
New Mexico	0
Louisiana	10
Elimination Semifinal
Texas West	8
Texas East	0

Winner's Bracket Final
Oklahoma	0
Louisiana	6 (forfeit)
Elimination Bracket Final
BYE
Texas West

Championship Game
Louisiana	0
Texas West	2

=== West region ===
The tournament is taking place in San Bernardino, California from July 18–23.

State	Location	Little League
Arizona	Sahuarita	Copper Hills Little League
Hawaii	Honolulu	Honolulu Little League
Nevada	Las Vegas	Summerlin South Little League
Northern California	Live Oak	Live Oak Little League
Southern California	San Marino	San Marino National Little League
Utah	Santa Clara	Snow Canyon Little League

==== Bracket ====
Winner's First Round
Nevada	2
Arizona	0
Northern California	4
Southern California	2
Elimination First Round
Arizona	6
Hawaii	5
Southern California	9
Utah	0

Winner's Semifinal
Utah	6
Nevada	18
Hawaii	1
Northern California	2
Elimination Semifinal
Arizona	7
Southern California	11

Winner's Bracket Final
Nevada	1
Northern California	4
Elimination Bracket Final
Nevada	5
Southern California	0

Championship Game
Northern California	2
Nevada	1

== International tournaments ==
=== Asia-Pacific region ===
The tournament took place in Narita, Japan from June 12-14. Two teams competed in a best-of-three series to determine the regional champion.

State	Location	Little League
Japan	Sangō	Kinki Softball Little League
Philippines	Bacolod	Negros Occidental Little League

Game 1
Japan	4
Philippines	3

Game 2
Japan	2
Philippines	1

=== Canada region ===
The tournament took place in Calgary, Alberta from July 23-25. Two teams competed in a best-of-three series to determine the regional champion.

State	Location	Little League
Alberta	Strathcona	Capital Region Little League
Quebec	Repentigny	On Field LLS Little League

Game 1
Alberta	1
Quebec	2

Game 2
Alberta	3
Quebec	9

=== Europe-Africa region ===
The tournament took place in Kutno, Poland from July 1–5.

Teams
Country	City	Little League	Record
Czech Republic	Bohemia	Bohemia Little League	5–0
Italy	Bologna	Emilia Romagna Little League	4–1
Ukraine	Kyiv	Kyiv Baseball School Little League	3–2
Netherlands	Haarlem	Kennemerland Little League	2–3
Spain	Madrid	Madrid Little League	1–4
Germany	Munich	South-East Germany Little League	0–5

==== Final ====
Championship Game
1	Czech Republic	2
2	Italy	4

=== Latin America region ===
The tournament took place in Guánica, Puerto Rico on July 6–10.

==== Pool A ====
Teams
Country	City	Little League	Record
Brazil	São Paulo	Cantareira Little League	2–1
Sint Maarten	Philipsburg	Sint Maarten Little League	2–1
Puerto Rico (Host)	Guánica	Yankees Family Group Little League	1–2

==== Pool B ====
Teams
Country	City	Little League	Record
Puerto Rico	Guayama	Guyama Softball Little League	3–0
Mexico	Mexico City	Petrolera Little League	1–2
Curaçao	Willemstad	Soraida Juliana Little League	0–3

==== Semifinal & final ====
Semifinals
A1	Brazil	12
B2	Mexico	6
B1	Puerto Rico	6
A2	Sint Maarten	1

Finals
A1	Brazil	0
B1	Puerto Rico	3
