= Kylan =

Kylan is a unisex given name. Notable people with the given name include:

- Kylan Boswell (born 2005), American basketball player
- Kylan Darnell, American internet personality and Miss Ohio Teen USA 2022
- Kylan Hamdaoui (born 1994), French rugby union player
