= Grant Sikes =

American internet personality

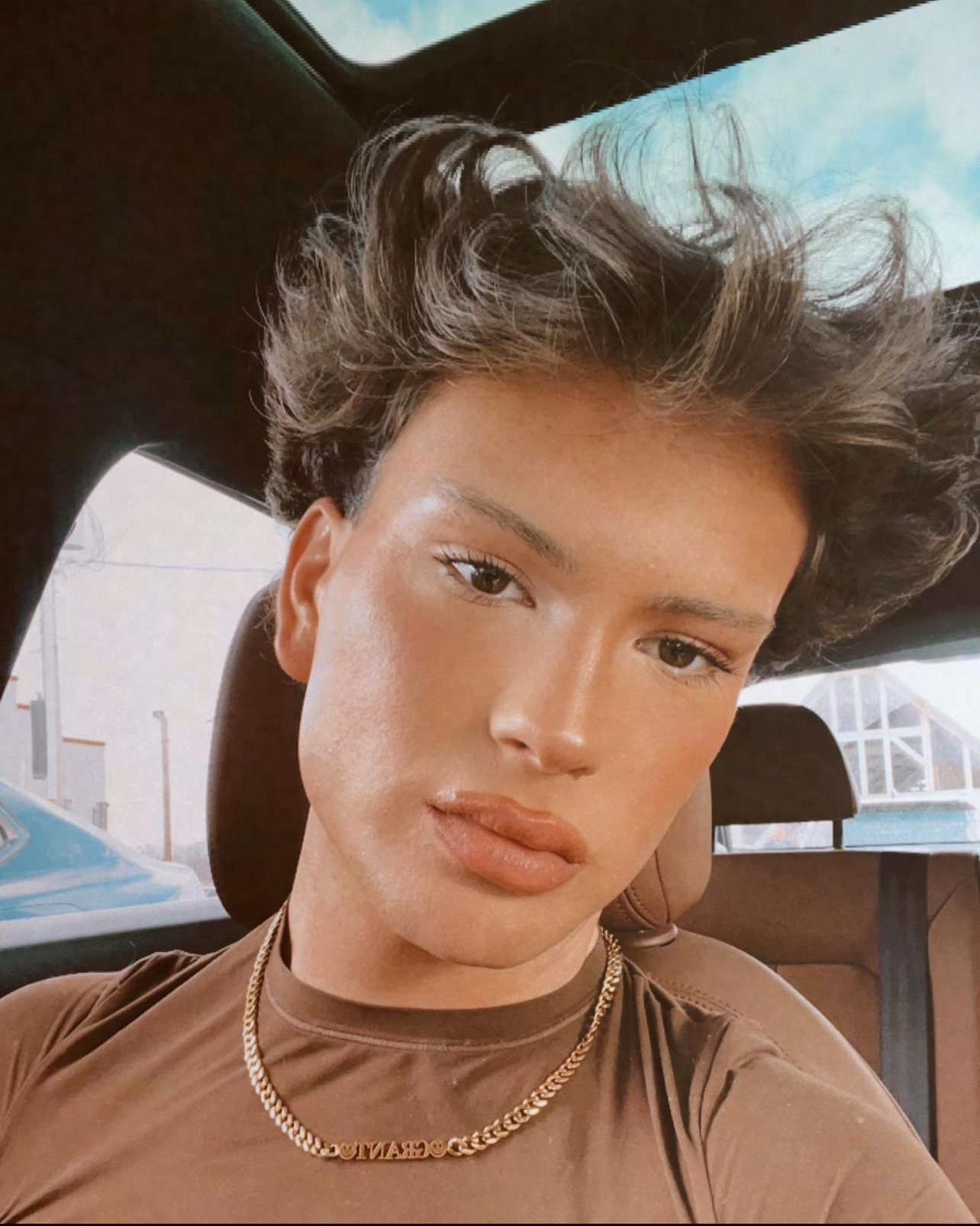
- Sikes in January 2024
- Born: November 11, 2002 (age 23); Cullman, Alabama
- Education: University of Alabama
- Occupations: Internet personality, Student
- Years active: 2022–present
- Known for: Bama Rush

Grant Sikes is an American internet personality. He came out as non-binary and as a transgender woman on his TikTok, after gaining internet fame from partaking in 2022 Bama Rush, the formal recruitment process for sororities affiliated with the National Panhellenic Conference at the University of Alabama. As of January 2024, Grant has stated that he no longer identifies as transgender or non-binary, and he is in fact a cisgender gay man. Grant has declared his support for Donald Trump, seemingly because he feels that Melania Trump embodies glamour and opulence.

== Biography ==
Sikes grew up in Cullman, Alabama. As a student at the University of Alabama, Sikes decided to go through formal recruitment for National Panhellenic Conference sororities. He documented his experiences going through recruitment on his TikTok, where he gained hundreds of thousands of followers and millions of views. Sikes, alongside other Alabama students such as Kylan Darnell, became internet famous as the recruitment process became an online sensation known as Bama Rush. Sikes was dropped from seventeen of the nineteen National Panhellenic Conference sororities after the first day of formal recruitment, leaving Kappa Alpha Theta and Gamma Phi Beta as the two sororities still interested in offering him a bid for membership. Sikes was ultimately not offered a bid for membership in any of the sororities and alleged that this was due to his being non-binary. According to the Alabama Panhellenic Association, "any student who consistently lives and self-identifies as a woman" can go through formal recruitment, but the sororities could individually discriminate based on gender identity and presentation.

After receiving negative media attention for his assumed trans identity throughout his participation in Bama Rush, Sikes denied being a transgender woman. He stated that he was outed as transgender by media outlets before publicly commenting on his gender expression on his own terms.
