= Introducing, Selma Blair =

2021 documentary film

- Theatrical release poster
- Directed by: Rachel Fleit
- Produced by: Mickey Liddell; Pete Shilaimon; Troy Nankin
- Starring: Selma Blair
- Cinematography: Shane Sigler
- Edited by: Sloane Klevin
- Music by: Raphaelle Thibaut
- Production company: LD Entertainment
- Distributed by: Discovery+
- Release dates: March 16, 2021 (SXSW); October 15, 2021 (United States)
- Running time: 106 minutes
- Country: United States
- Language: English
- Box office: $5,700

Introducing, Selma Blair is a 2021 American documentary film directed by Rachel Fleit. It follows Selma Blair adapting to new ways of living after revealing her multiple sclerosis diagnosis.

The film had its world premiere at South by Southwest on March 16, 2021, where it won the Special Jury Award for Exceptional Intimacy in Storytelling in the Documentary Feature Competition. It was released in a limited release on October 15, 2021, prior to streaming on Discovery+ on October 21, 2021.

== Synopsis ==
Selma Blair adapts to new ways of living after revealing her multiple sclerosis diagnosis.

== Release ==
The film had its world premiere at South by Southwest on March 16, 2021. Prior to, Discovery+ acquired distribution rights to the film. It was released in a limited release on October 15, 2021, prior to digital streaming on Discovery+ on October 21, 2021.

== Reception ==
=== Critical response ===
On the review aggregator website Rotten Tomatoes, 100% of 38 critics' reviews are positive, with an average rating of 8.10/10. The website's consensus reads: "Introducing, Selma Blair lives up to its title with a personal look at a celebrity pulling back the curtain with courage, humor, and grace." On Metacritic, the film has a weighted average score of 80 out of 100 based on 12 critics, indicating "generally favorable" reviews.

CNN's Brian Lowry said the film was "an intense experience, one whose focus is undeniably stirring but which leaves certain aspects of Blair's life and resume somewhat underdeveloped." Variety's Guy Lodge called the film "eye-opening and empathetic" and "intensely moving as a documentary in its own right, enriched by a human subject who appears to learn as much about herself in the course of filming as we do."
