= 2025 Little League Softball World Series qualification =

There were twelve Little League softball regional tournaments to qualify for the 2025 Little League Softball World Series in Greenville, North Carolina which took place between June 12 and July 28, 2025.

== Qualified teams ==
Region	Location	Little League
Asia-Pacific	Iwate, Japan	Tohoku Little League
Canada	(Canada) Repentigny, Quebec	On Field LLS Little League
Central	Floyds Knobs, Indiana	Floyds Knobs Community Club Little League
Europe-Africa	Prague, Czech Republic	Prague Little League
Host (North Carolina)	Winterville, North Carolina	Pitt County Girls Softball Little League
Latin America	São Paulo, Brazil	Cantareira Little League
Mid-Atlantic	Johnstown, Pennsylvania	West Suburban Little League
New England	Guilford, Connecticut	Guilford Little League
Northwest	(Washington (state)) Mill Creek, Washington	Mill Creek Little League
Southeast	Lake Mary, Florida	Lake Mary Little League
Southwest	Tulsa, Oklahoma	Tulsa National Little League
West	Los Angeles, California	Westchester-Del Rey Little League

== United States tournaments ==
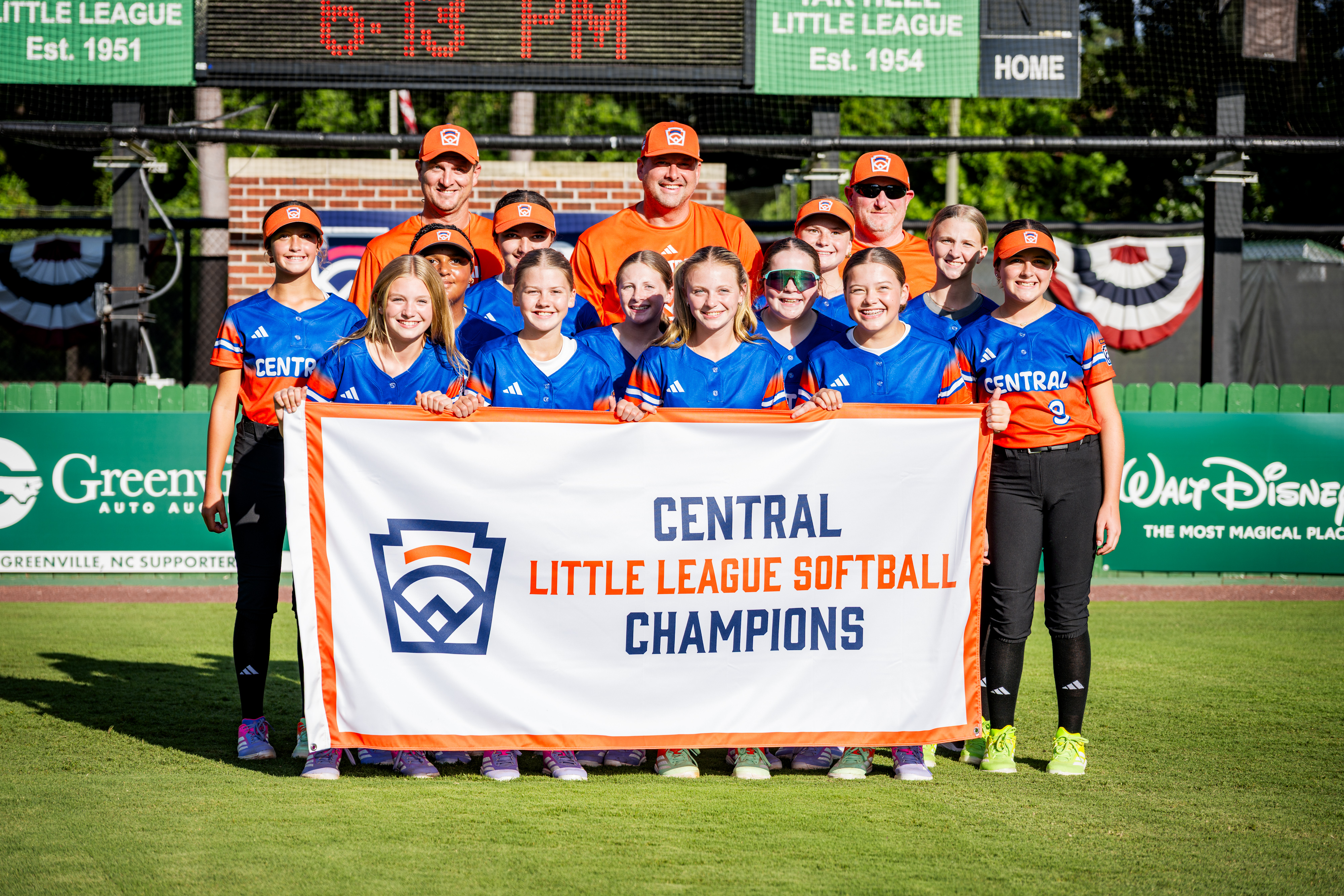
Central region champions from Floyds Knobs, Indiana

=== Central region ===
The tournament occurred in Whitestown, Indiana from July 20–25, 2025.

State	Location	Little League
Illinois	Elmhusrt	Elmhurst Youth Baseball & Softball
Indiana	Floyds Knobs	Floyds Knobs Community Club Little League
Iowa	Le Mars	Le Mars Little League
Kentucky	Owensboro	Daviess County Little League
Michigan	Hudsonville	Hudsonville Little League
Missouri	Columbia	Daniel Boone Little League
Nebraska	Omaha	Keystone Little League
Ohio	Canfield	Canfield Little League
Wisconsin	Appleton	Appleton Little League

==== Bracket ====
Winner's First Round	Winner's Second Round	Winner's Semifinal	Winner's Final	Championship Game
Indiana	2
Indiana	11	Michigan	0
Indiana	11
Wisconsin	0
Nebraska	1
Nebraska	8
Iowa	7
Indiana	0
Kentucky	2
Illinois	12
Ohio	4
Illinois	1
Kentucky	11
Kentucky	3
Missouri	2	Kentucky	4
Indiana	7
Elimination First Round	Elimination Second Round	Elimination Quarterfinal	Elimination Semifinal	Elimination Final
Missouri	18
Missouri	2	Nebraska	0	Indiana	5
Wisconsin	5	Ohio	1	Missouri	7	Missouri	1
Missouri	6	Michigan	1
Michigan	6
Michigan	10	Illinois	2
Iowa	0

=== Host region (North Carolina) ===
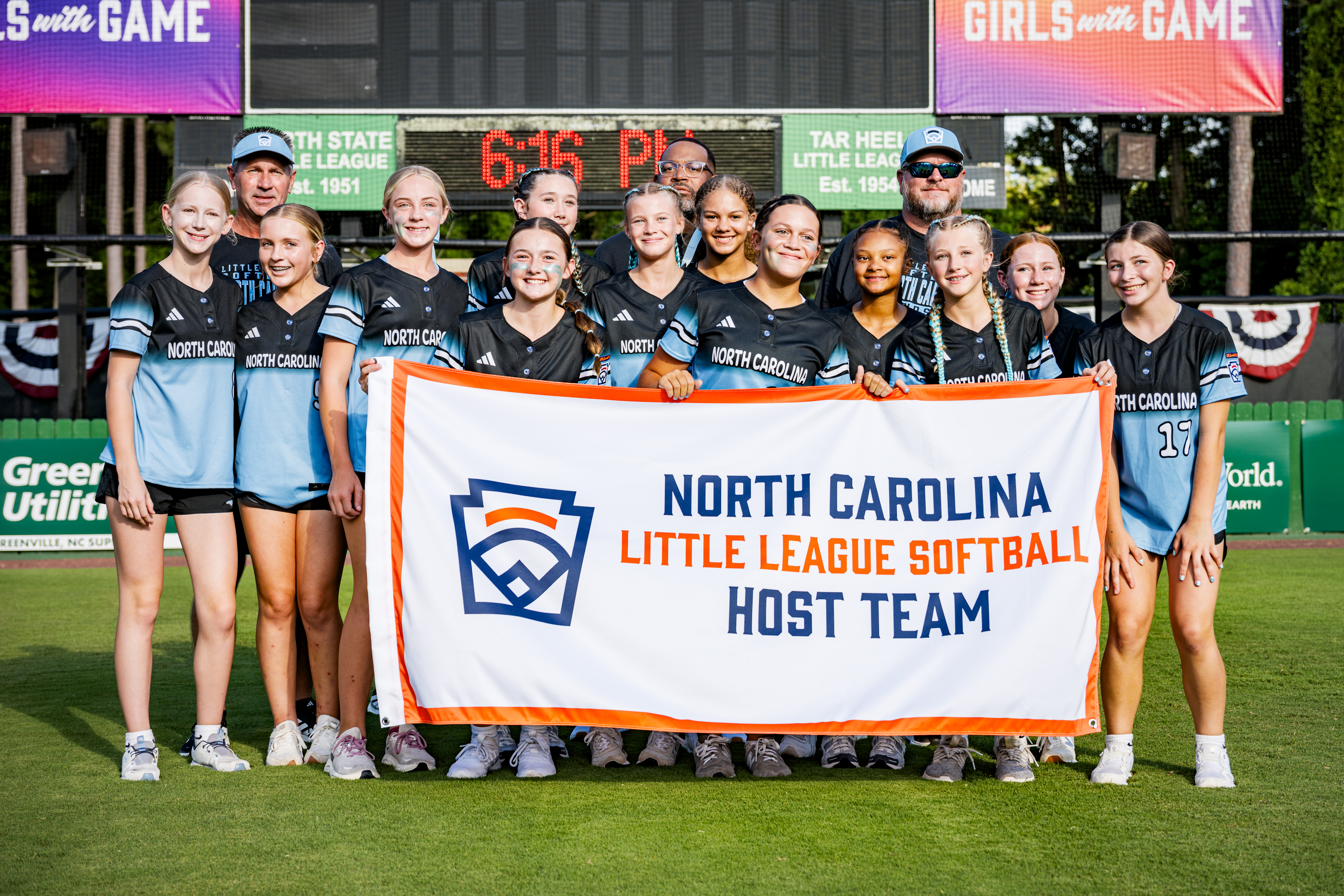
Host region champions from Winterville, North Carolina

The North Carolina state tournament took place in Sylva, North Carolina from July 5–9. The winner of the North Carolina state tournament advanced to the Little League Softball World Series representing the Host Region. The winner of the elimination bracket advanced to the Southeast region tournament as the North Carolina Representative.

District	Location	Little League
District 1	Rutherfordton	Rutherford County Little League
District 2	Salisbury	Rowan County Little League
District 3	Charlotte	Mallard Creek Little League
District 4	Winterville	Pitt County Girls Softball Little League
District 5	Sylvia	Great Smokies Little League
District 6	Archer Lodge	Johnston County Little League

==== Winner's bracket ====
First Round
(North Carolina) Pitt County	4
(North Carolina) Mallard Creek	3
(North Carolina) Johnston County	14
(North Carolina) Great Smokies	2

Semifinals
(North Carolina) Rutherford County	1
(North Carolina) Pitt County	11
(North Carolina) Johnston County	2
(North Carolina) Rowan County	7

Championship Game
(North Carolina) Pitt County	6
(North Carolina) Rowan County	5

==== Elimination Bracket ====
First Round
(North Carolina) Mallard Creek	3
(North Carolina) Johnston County	1
(North Carolina) Great Smokies	9
(North Carolina) Rutherford County	4

Semifinal
(North Carolina) Mallard Creek	12
(North Carolina) Great Smokies	0

Bracket Final
(North Carolina) Rowan County	2
(North Carolina) Mallard Creek	4

=== Mid-Atlantic region ===
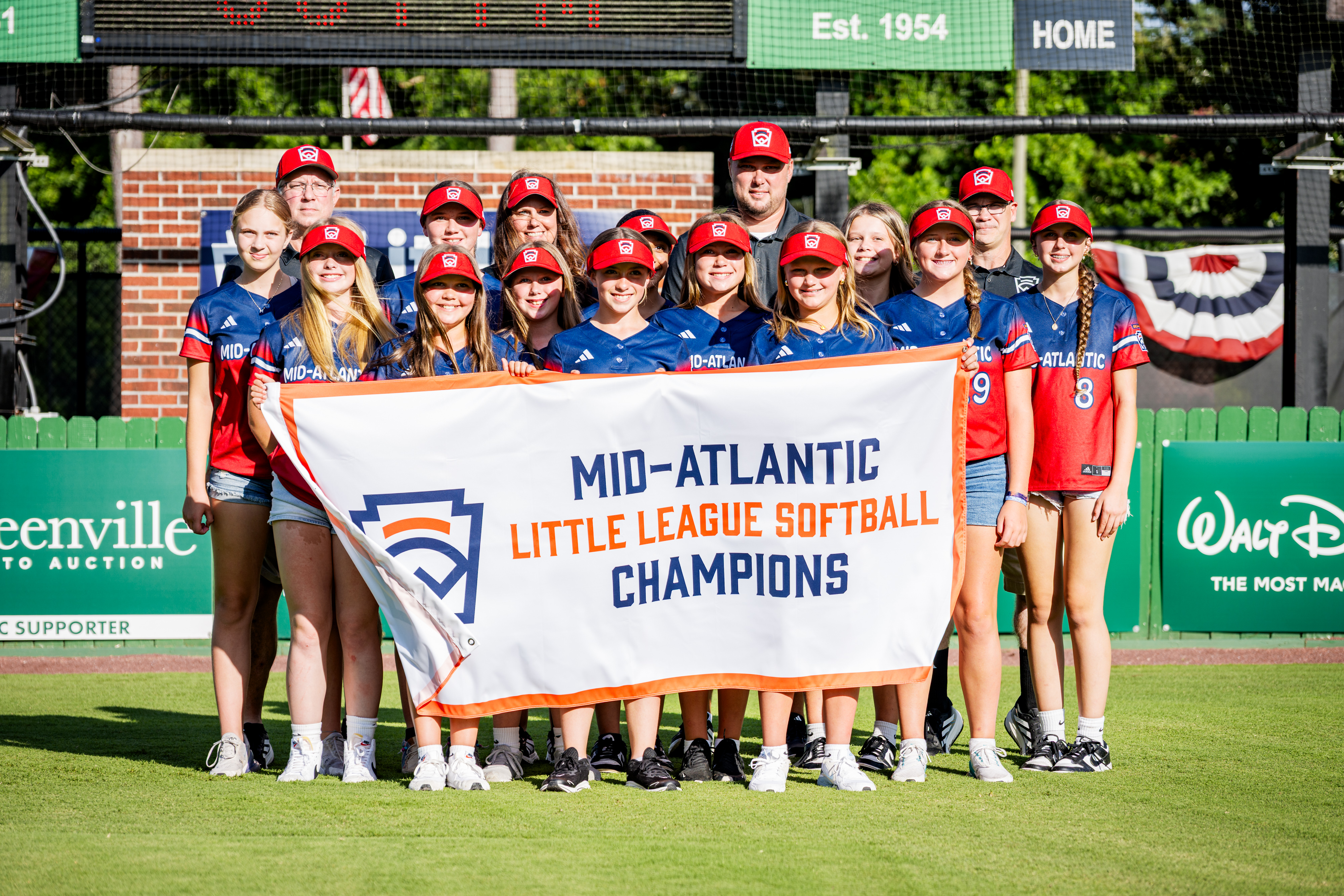
Mid-Atlantic region champions from Johnstown, Pennsylvania

The tournament took place in Bristol, Connecticut from July 20–25.

State	Location	Little League
Delaware	Camden	Camden-Wyoming Little League
Maryland	Delmar	Delmar Little League
New Jersey	Toms River	Toms River Little League
(New York (state)) New York	Wappinger Falls	Town of Wappingers American Little League
Pennsylvania	Johnstown	West Suburban Little League
(Washington, D.C.) Washington, D.C.	Washington, D.C.	Mamie Johnson Little League

==== Bracket ====
Winner's First Round
Pennsylvania	7
Maryland	0
(Washington, D.C.) Washington, DC	0
Delaware	10
Elimination First Round
Maryland	4
New Jersey	5
(Washington, D.C.) Washington, DC	1
(New York (state)) New York	11

Winner's Semifinal
(New York (state)) New York	0
Pennsylvania	1
Delaware	6
New Jersey	5
Elimination Semifinal
New Jersey	1
(New York (state)) New York	0

Winner's Bracket Final
Pennsylvania	6
Delaware	2
Elimination Bracket Final
Delaware	3
New Jersey	1

Championship Game
Pennsylvania	5
Delaware	4

=== New England region ===
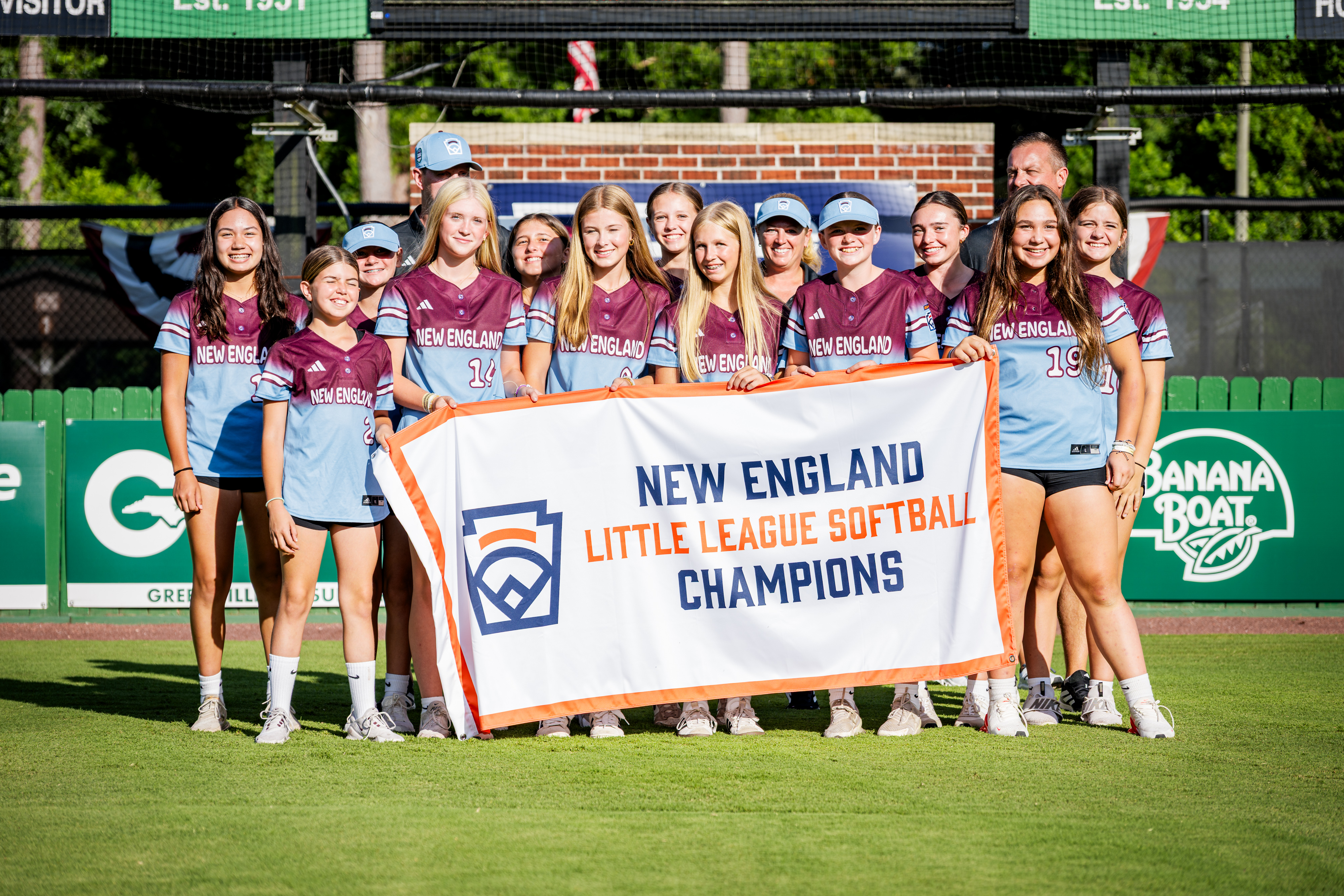
New England region champions from Guilford, Connecticut

The tournament took place in Bristol, Connecticut from July 20–25.

State	Location	Little League
Connecticut	Guilford	Guilford Little League
Maine	Buxton	Bonnie Eagle Little League
Massachusetts	Canton	Canton Little League
New Hampshire	Concord	Concord National Youth Softball Little League
Rhode Island	Cranston	Cranston Western Little League
Vermont	St. Albans	Champlain Little League

==== Bracket ====
Winner's First Round
Connecticut	9
New Hampshire	0
Rhode Island	0
Maine	10
Elimination First Round
New Hampshire	2
Maine	12
Rhode Island	10
Massachusetts	2

Winner's Semifinal
Massachusetts	2
Connecticut	13
Maine	3
Vermont	4
Elimination Semifinal
Maine	8
Rhode Island	3

Winner's Bracket Final
Connecticut	10
Vermont	0
Elimination Bracket Final
Vermont	1
Maine	7

Championship Game
Connecticut	1
Maine	0

=== Northwest region ===
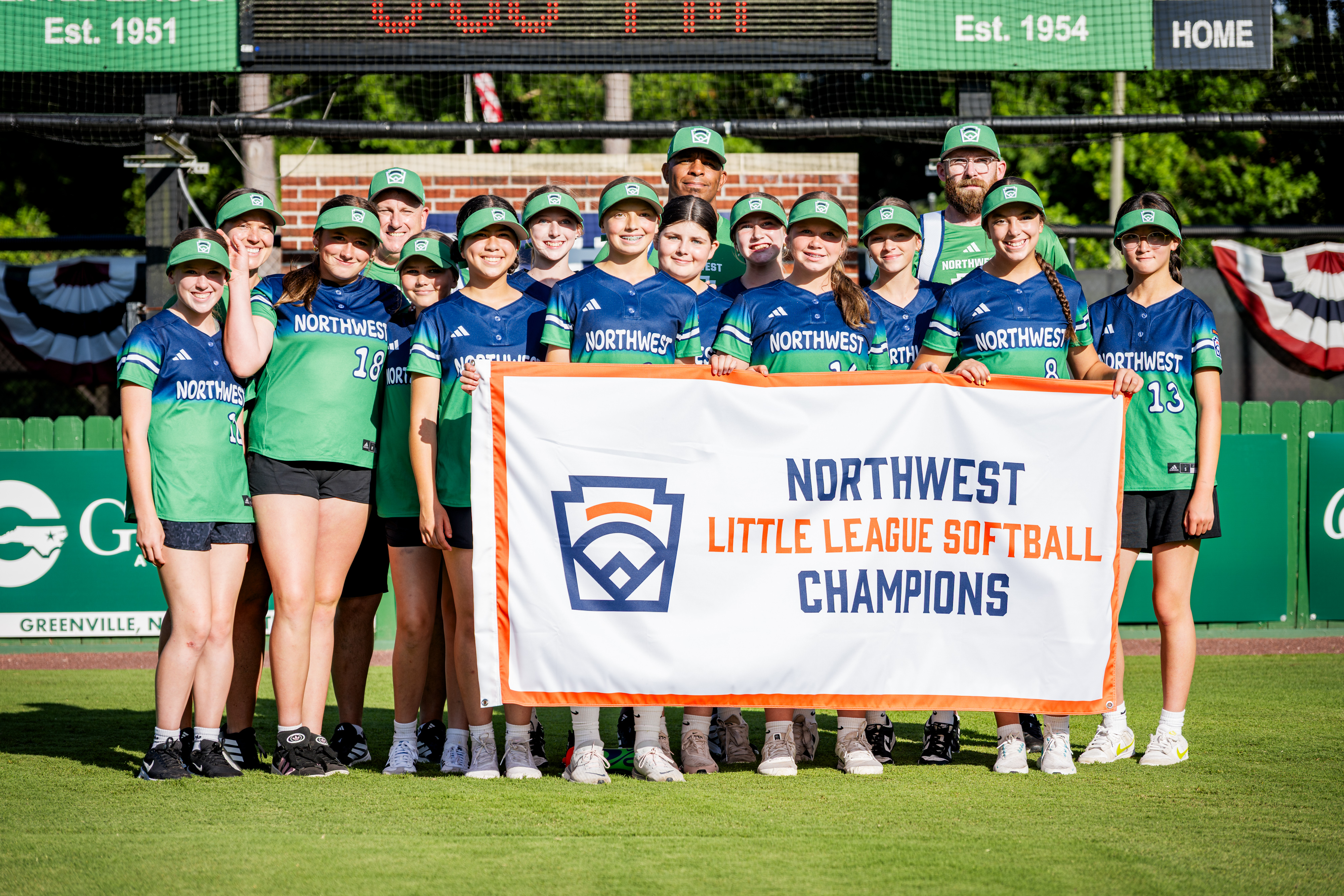
Northwest region champions from Mill Creek, Florida

The tournament took place in San Bernardino, California from July 19–25.

State	Location	Little League
Alaska	Anchorage	Abbott-O-Rabbitt Little League
Colorado	Monument	Tri Lakes Little League
Idaho	Eagle	West Valley Little League
Montana	Billings	Boulder Arrowhead Little League
Oregon	Hermiston	Hermiston Little League
(Washington (state)) Washington	Mill Creek	Mill Creek Little League

==== Bracket ====
Winner's First Round
Colorado	2
Idaho	12
(Washington (state)) Washington	2
Oregon	0
Elimination First Round
Colorado	6
Alaska	3
Oregon	5
Montana	4

Winner's Semifinal
Idaho	9
Montana	2
(Washington (state)) Washington	19
Alaska	0
Elimination Semifinal
Colorado	5
Oregon	6

Winner's Bracket Final
Idaho	2
(Washington (state)) Washington	12
Elimination Bracket Final
Idaho	2
Oregon	6

Championship Game
(Washington (state)) Washington	10
Oregon	9

=== Southeast Region ===
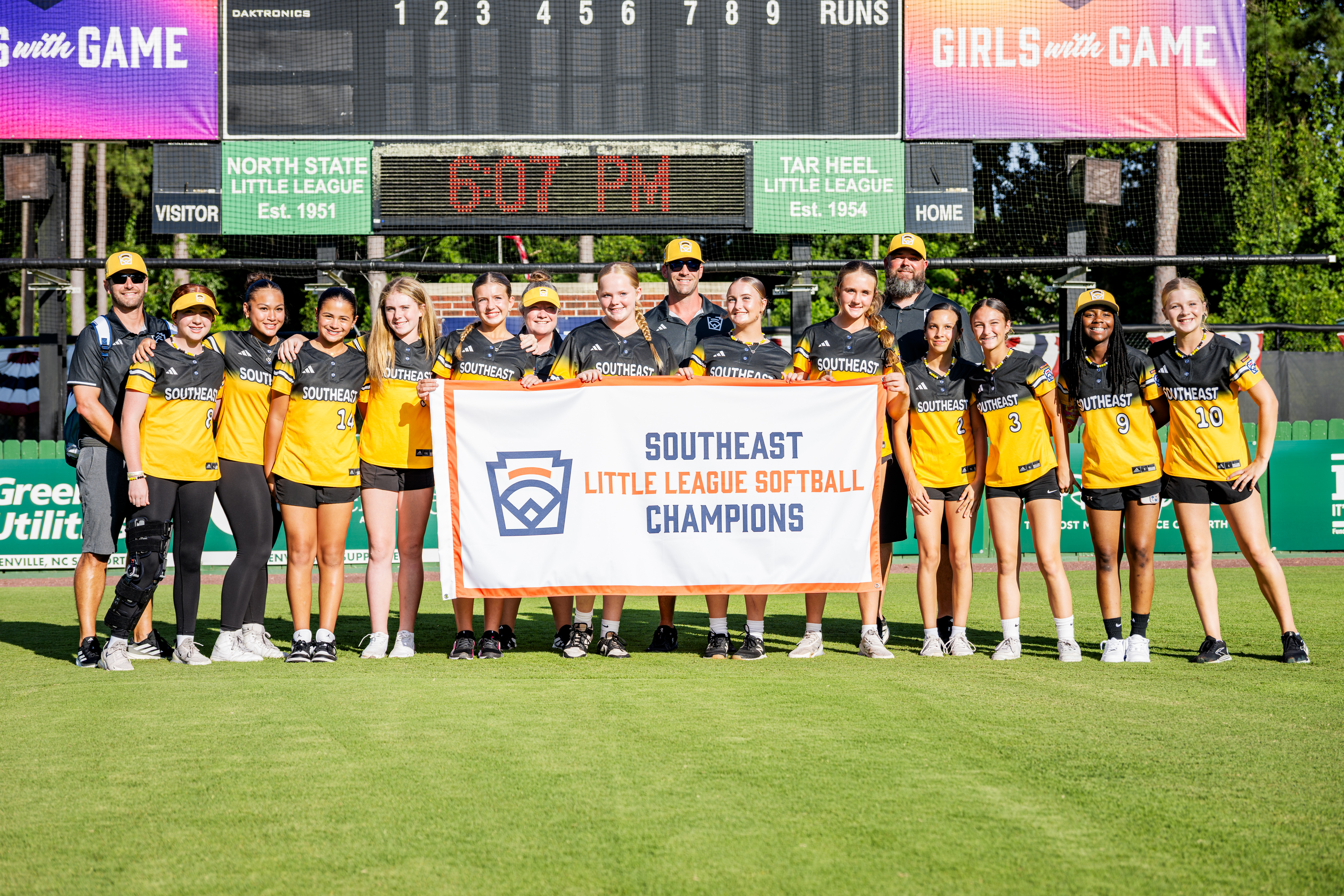
Southeast region champions from Lake Mary, Florida

The tournament took place in Warner Robins, Georgia from July 20–25.

State	Location	Little League
Florida	Lake Mary	Lake Mary Little League
(Georgia (U.S. state)) Georgia	Cartersville	Bartow County Little League
North Carolina	Charlotte	Mallard Creek Little League
South Carolina	Taylors	Northwood Little League
Tennessee	Charlotte	Dickson County Little League
Virginia	McLean	McLean Little League
West Virginia	Sissonville	Sissonville Little League

==== Bracket ====
Winner's First Round	Winner's Second Round	Winner's Bracket Final	Championship Game
Tennessee	0
Virginia	1
Florida	0
Tennessee	1
Virginia	2
North Carolina	1
North Carolina	2
West Virginia	1
North Carolina	7
(Georgia (U.S. state)) Georgia	2
South Carolina	3
(Georgia (U.S. state)) Georgia	7
Virginia	1
Florida	8
Elimination First Round	Elimination Second Round	Elimination Semifinal	Elimination Bracket Final
South Carolina	5
West Virginia	0	Tennessee	1	North Carolina	1
South Carolina	9	South Carolina	0	Florida	6
Florida	10
Florida	2
(Georgia (U.S. state)) Georgia	0

=== Southwest region ===
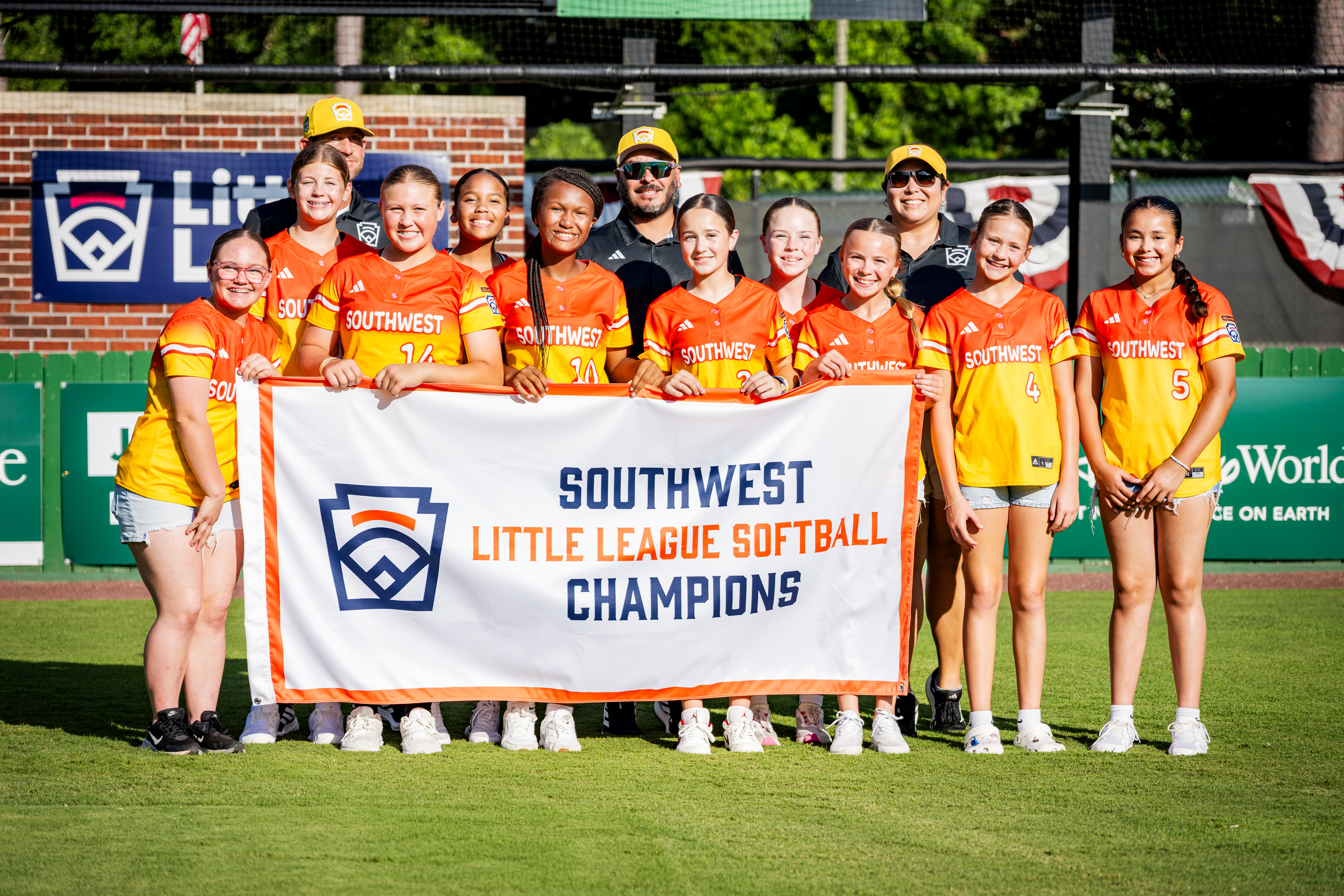
Southwest region champions from Tulsa, Oklahoma

The tournament took place in Waco, Texas from July 21–25.

State	Location	Little League
Louisiana	Sterlington	Sterlington Little League
New Mexico	Carlsbad	Carlsbad National Little League
Oklahoma	Tulsa	Tulsa National Little League
Texas East	Hallettsville	Hallettsville Little League
Texas West	Hewitt	Midway Little League

==== Bracket ====
Winner's First Round
New Mexico	0
Texas West	7
Elimination First Round
New Mexico	1
Oklahoma	3

Winner's Semifinal
Texas West	0
Texas East	9
Oklahoma	3
Louisiana	6
Elimination Semifinal
Texas West	2
Oklahoma	5

Winner's Bracket Final
Texas East	1
Louisiana	4
Elimination Bracket Final
Texas East	2
Oklahoma	6

Championship Game
Louisiana	0
Oklahoma	7

=== West region ===
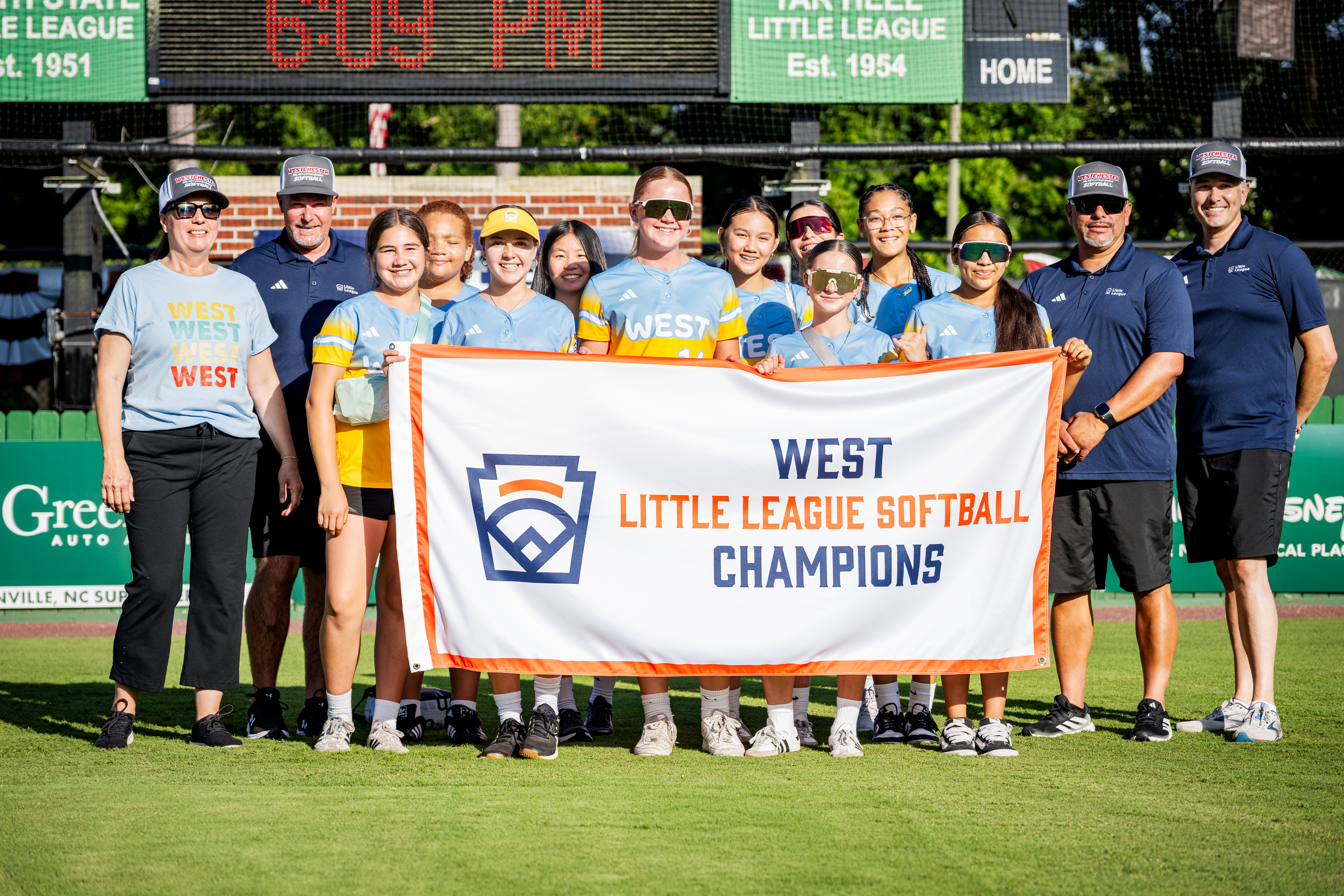
West region champions from Los Angeles, California

The tournament took place in San Bernardino, California from July 19–25.

State	Location	Little League
Arizona	Tucson	Thornydale Little League
Hawaii	Honolulu	Honolulu Little League
Nevada	Las Vegas	Summerlin South Little League
Northern California	Live Oak	Live Oak Little League
Southern California	Los Angeles	Westchester-Del Rey Little League
Utah	Washington	Washington Little League

==== Bracket ====
Winner's First Round
Utah	1
Northern California	15
Hawaii	6
Arizona	9
Elimination First Round
Utah	5
Southern California	15
Hawaii	9
Nevada	8

Winner's Semifinal
Nevada	0
Northern California	9
Arizona	8
Southern California	2
Elimination Semifinal
Southern California	6
Hawaii	3

Winner's Bracket Final
Northern California	0
Arizona	1
Elimination Bracket Final
Southern California	8
Northern California	6

Championship Game
Arizona	2
Southern California	12

== International tournaments ==
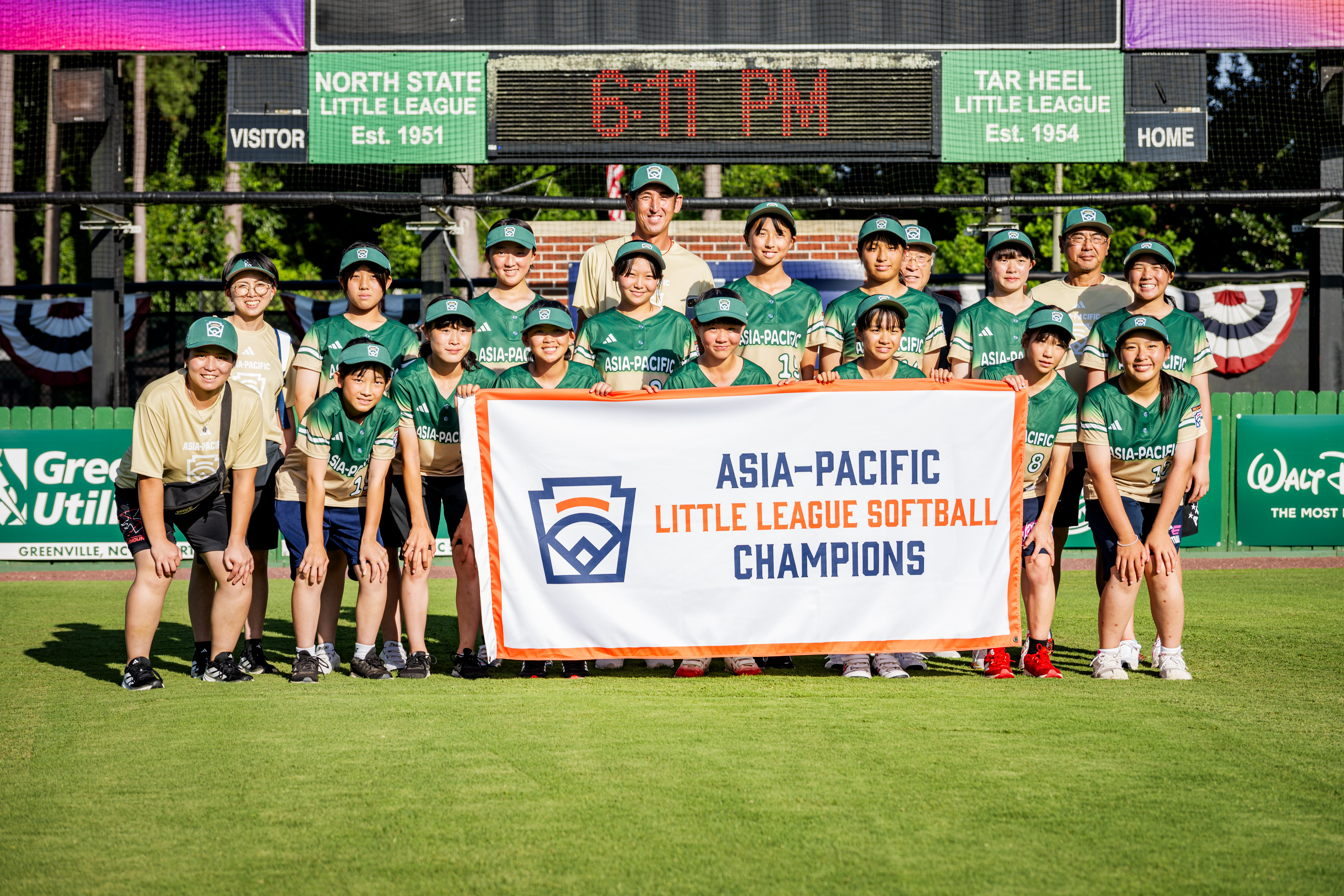
Asia-Pacific region champions from Iwate, Japan

=== Asia-Pacific region ===
The tournament took place in Narita, Japan on June 12. Two teams competed in a best-of-three series to determine the regional champion.

State	Location	Little League
Japan	Iwate	Tohoku Little League
Philippines	Bacolod	Negros Occidental Little League

Game 1
Japan	11
Philippines	1

Game 2
Japan	4
Philippines	3

=== Canada region ===
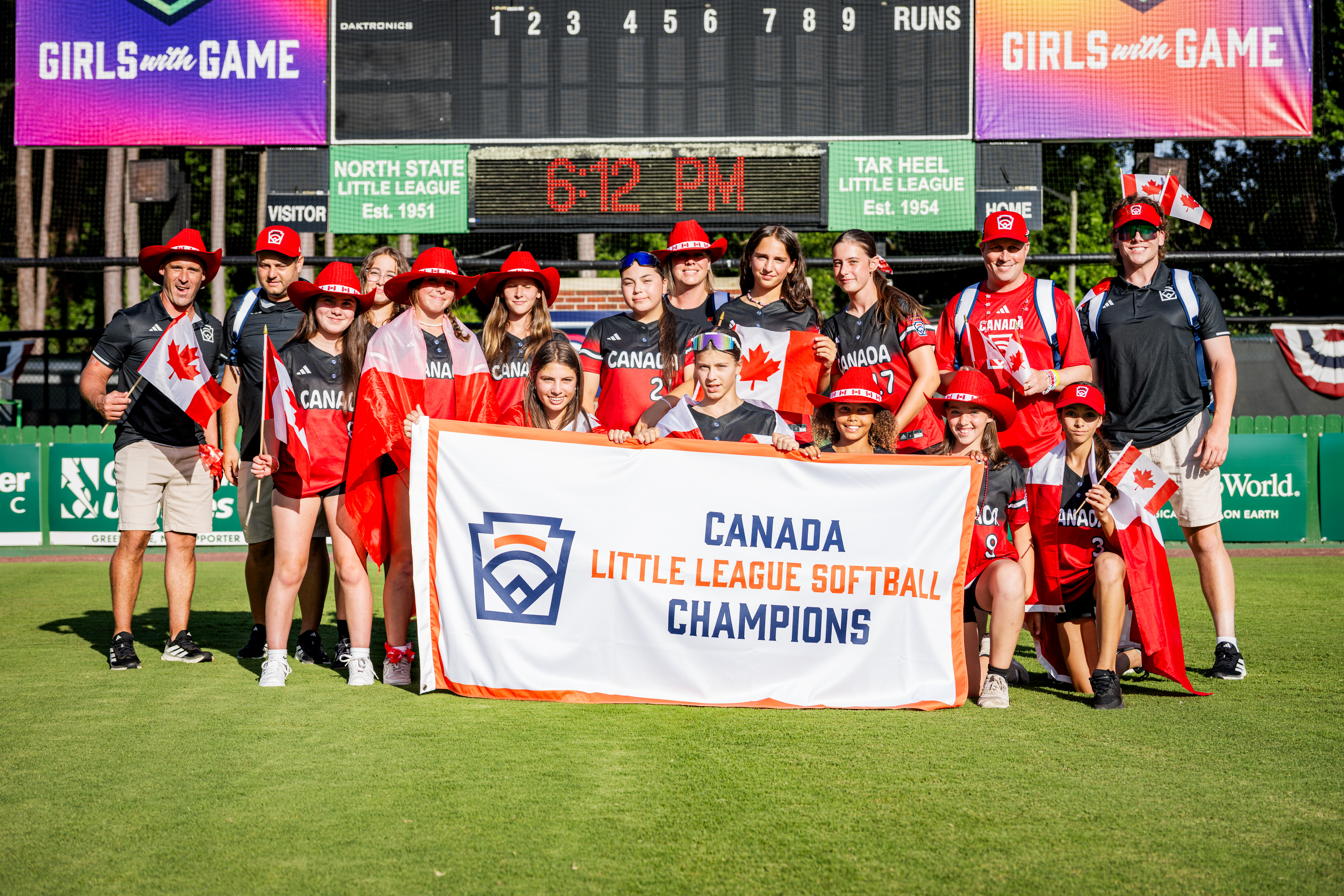
Canada region champions from Repentigny, Quebec

The tournament took place in Repentigny, Quebec on July 24–28.

Teams
Province	Location	Little League	Record
Alberta	St. Albert	Capital Region Little League	3–0
Quebec	Repentigny	On Field LLS Little League	2–1
New Brunswick	Saint John	Saint John Little League	1–2
Quebec (Host)	Repentigny	On Field LLS Little League	0–3

Semifinal
1	Alberta	18
4	Quebec (Host)	3
2	Quebec	7
3	New Brunswick	1

Championship Game
1	Alberta	4
2	Quebec	5
Consolation Game
4	Quebec (Host)	0
3	New Brunswick	12

=== Europe-Africa region ===
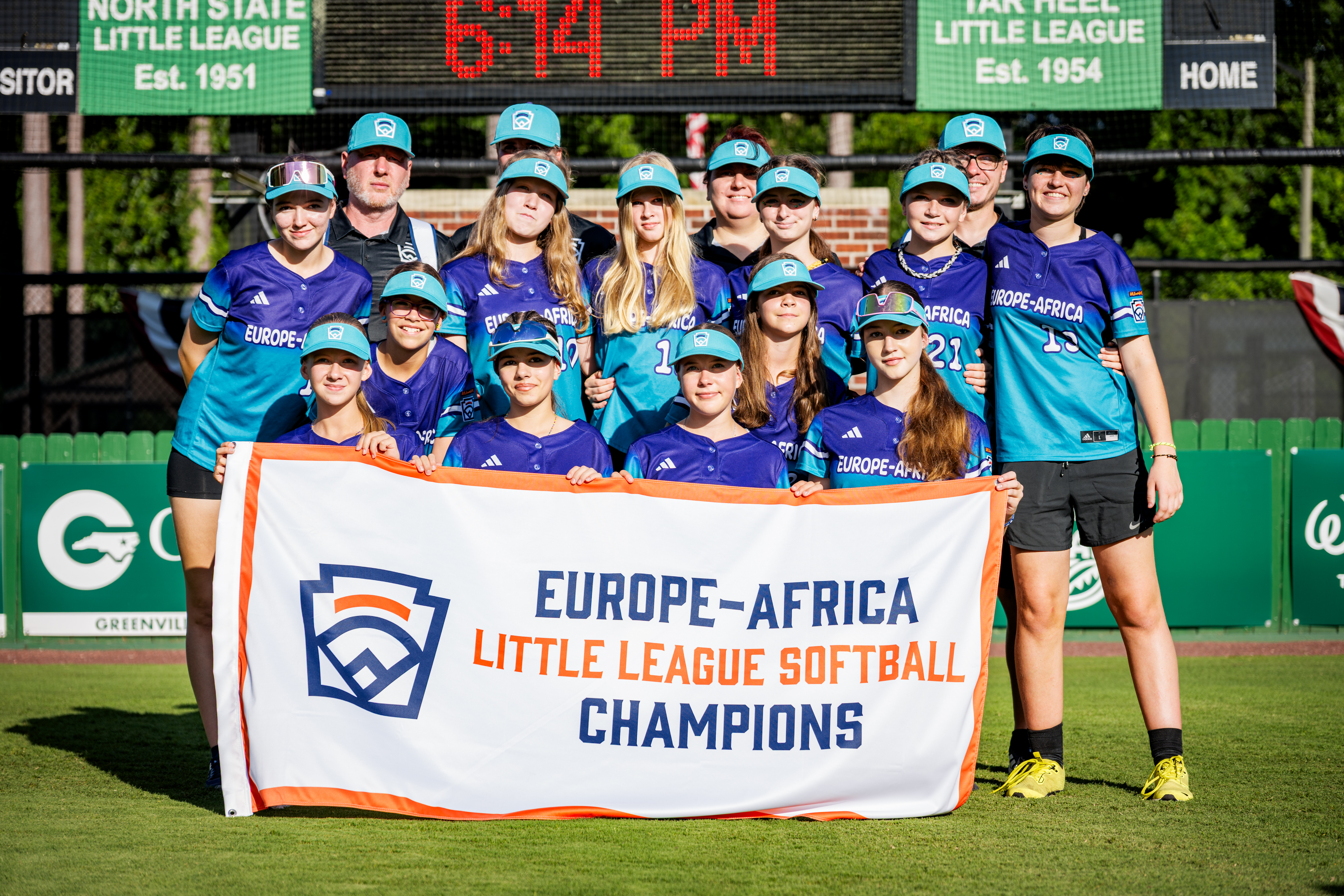
Europe-Africa region champions from Prague, Czech Republic

The tournament took place in Kutno, Poland on July 2–6.

Teams
Country	City	Little League	Record
Czech Republic	Prague	Prague Little League	6–0
Italy	Bologna	Emilia Romagna Little League	5–1
Netherlands	Haarlem	Kennemerland Little League	4–2
Germany	Mannheim	South-West Germany Little League	3–3
Poland	Krosniewice	Krosniewice Little League	2–4
Ukraine	Kyiv	Kyiv Baseball School Little League	1–5
Spain	Barcelona	Catalunya Little League	0–6

==== Final ====
Championship Game
1	Czech Republic	5
2	Italy	3

=== Latin America region ===
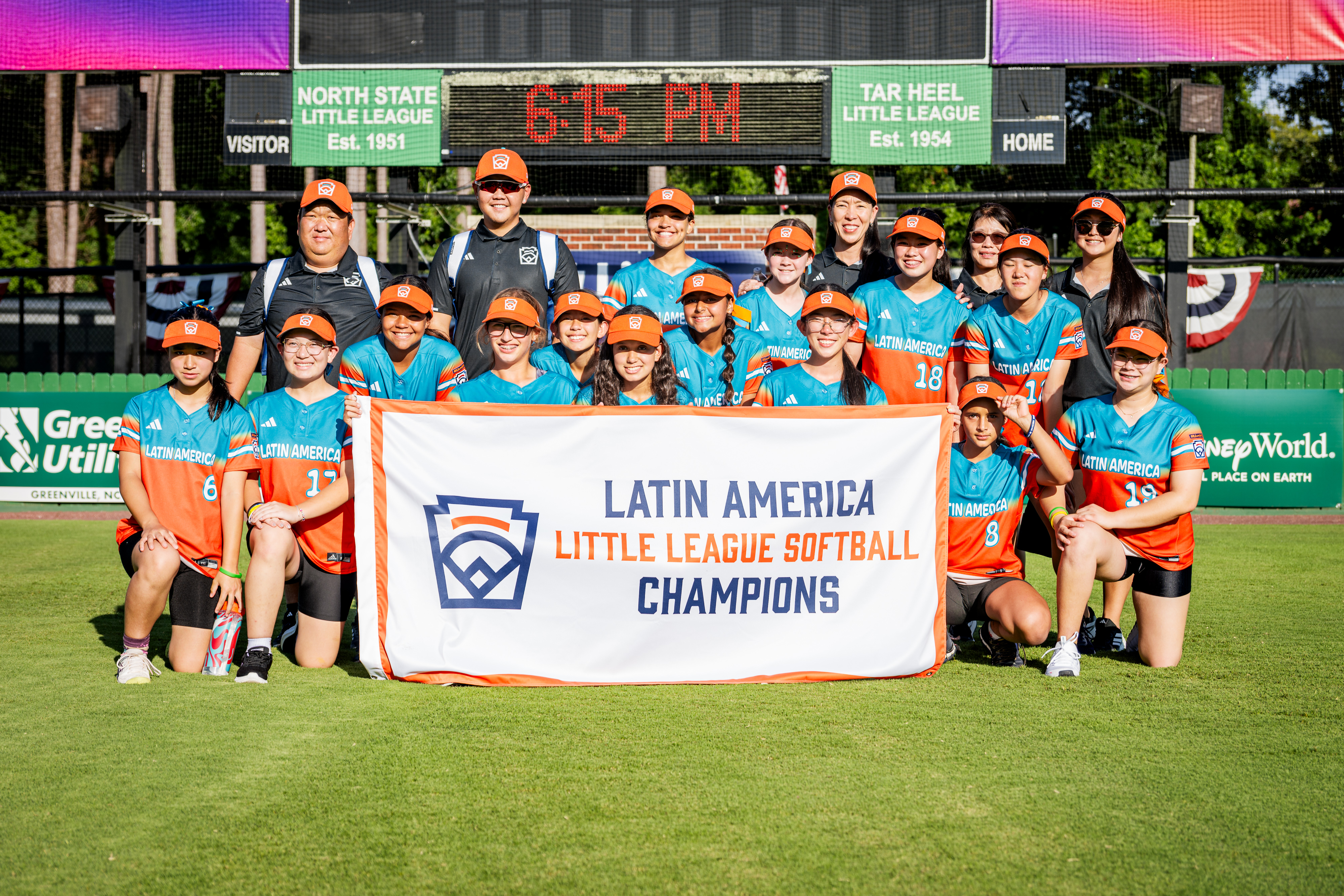
Latin America region champions from São Paulo, Brazil

The tournament took place in Guayama, Puerto Rico on July 14–18.

Teams
Country	City	Little League	Record
Puerto Rico	Guayama	Guayama Softball Little League	4–0
Brazil	São Paulo	Cantareira Little League	3–1
Mexico	Mexico City	Olmeca Little League	2–2
Guatemala	Guatemala City	ASOSOFT Guatemala Little League	1–3
Sint Maarten	Philipsburg	St. Maarten Little League	0–4

==== Championship game ====
Finals
1	Puerto Rico	0
2	Brazil	2
