= Rachel Fleit =

American documentary filmmaker (born 1981)

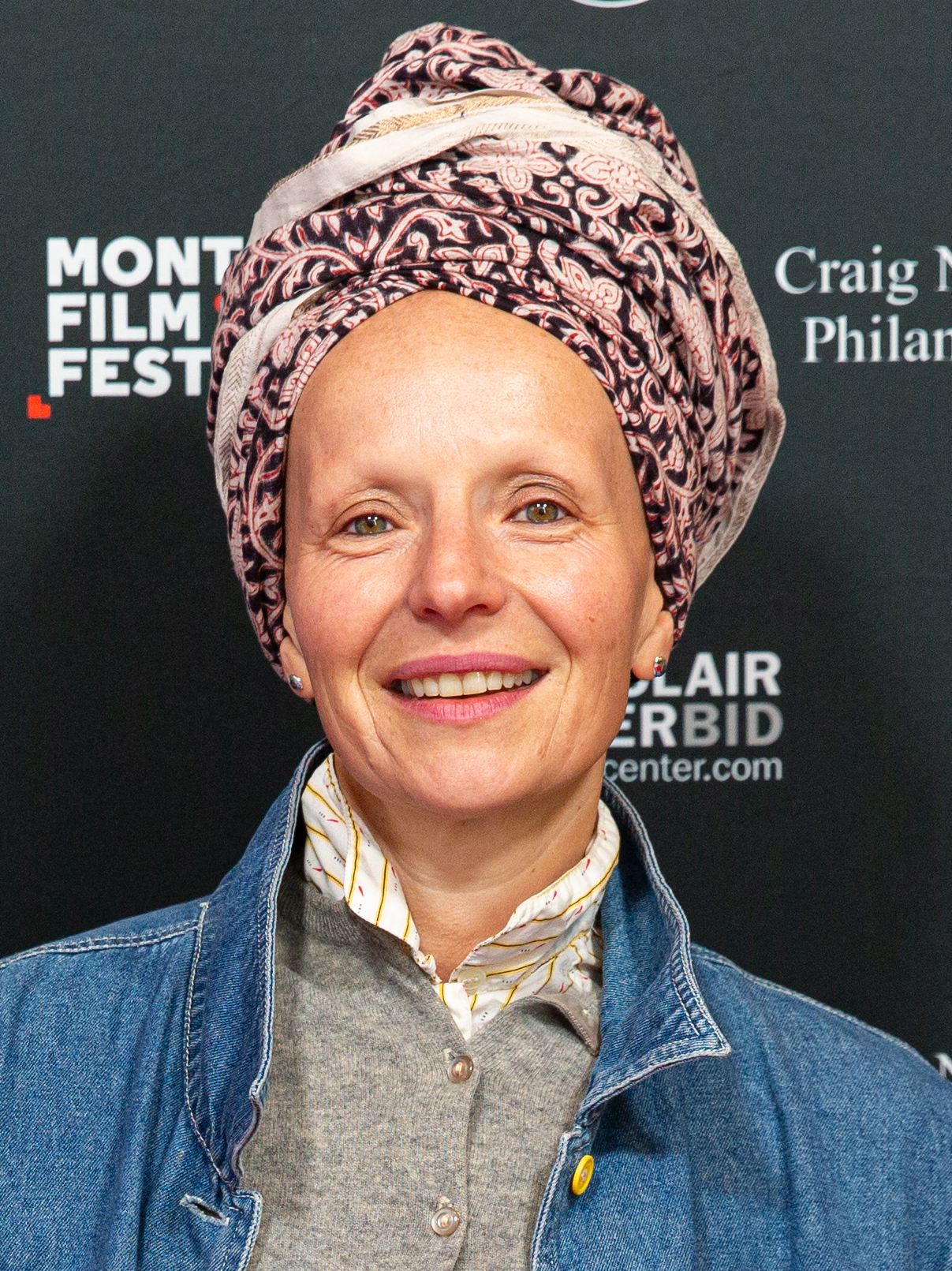
- Fleit at the 2025 Montclair Film Festival
- Born: January 1981 (age 45); Manhattan, New York, U.S.
- Education: Ithaca College
- Years active: 2014–present
- Website: https://www.rachelfleit.com

Rachel Fleit (born January 1981) is an American director, producer, and writer. She is best known for her feature documentaries, Introducing, Selma Blair (2021) and Bama Rush (2023).

== Early life and education ==
Fleit was born in Manhattan in 1981 and raised on Long Island. When she was 18 months old, Fleit was diagnosed with alopecia, and wore a wig from age four to 18. Fleit attended Ithaca College.

== Career ==
Fleit has directed two documentary shorts, Gefilte (2018), and Ava & Bianca (2020); three feature documentaries, Introducing, Selma Blair (2021), Bama Rush (2023), and The Slightest Touch (2026); and a documentary short Barbara and Stanley: A Modern Romance featuring Stanley Dorfman and Barbara Flood.

Fleit co-founded the luxury womenswear brand Honor NYC with Giovanna Randall.
