= Kylan Darnell =

American beauty pageant winner and internet personality

- Born: Wheelersburg, Ohio, U.S.
- Education: University of Alabama
- Height: 5 ft 7 in (1.70 m)
- Beauty pageant titleholder
- Title: Miss Ohio Teen USA 2022
- Hair color: Blonde
- Eye color: Brown
- Major competitions: Miss Ohio Teen USA 2022 (Winner); Miss Teen USA 2022 (Top 16)
Kylan Darnell
Instagram information
- Page: Kylan Olivia Darnell
- Followers: 568 K
TikTok information
- Page: kylan_darnell
- Followers: 1.3M
- Last updated: September 28, 2026

Kylan Olivia Darnell is an American beauty pageant winner and internet personality. She was crowned Miss Ohio Teen USA in 2022 and went on to represent Ohio at the Miss Teen USA 2022, where she placed in the Top 16 and won the Fan Favorite title. Darnell is a TikToker who became notable for partaking in Bama Rush, an online phenomenon that focused on the recruitment for National Panhellenic Conference sororities at the University of Alabama. Darnell, who documented her journey through recruitment and then as a member of Zeta Tau Alpha, has received over 84.1 million likes on her videos, and amassed over 661,600 followers by 2023.

== Early life and education ==
Darnell was born in Wheelersburg, Ohio and grew up on her family's farm in Franklin Furnace. She attended Wheelersburg High School, where she was a varsity cheerleader and a member of the softball, track & field, and soccer teams.

== Pageants ==
Darnell began pageants as a child, winning Little Miss Portsmouth when she was five years old. She won the title of Miss Portsmouth's Outstanding Teen when she was fifteen years old, competing with dance as her talent portion and volunteering as her charitable platform. She went on to compete in the Miss Ohio Outstanding Teen. She was fourth runner-up in 2019 and second runner-up in 2021 at the Miss Ohio Outstanding Teen pageant.

On May 21, 2022, Darnell was crowned Miss Ohio Teen USA at the Vern Riffe Center for the Arts in Portsmouth, Ohio. She had competed in the pageant the previous three years but hadn't made it to the finalist round until 2022. Her platform for competing was Girl Power, which promotes women empowerment. She represented Ohio while competing at the Miss Teen USA 2022 in October 2022 at the Grand Sierra Resort in Reno, Nevada.

== TikTok ==
While going through formal recruitment ("rush") to join a National Panhellenic Conference sorority at the University of Alabama, Darnell began making TikTok videos with rush tips and her outfit choices. Darnell was accepted into Zeta Tau Alpha sorority. The popularity of videos detailing sorority life and recruitment at the University of Alabama led to a phenomenon known as "Bama Rush" and "Rush Tok", which led to the rise of multiple TikTok celebrities, including Darnell and Grant Sikes.

In July 2023, Darnell received backlash online after she made a TikTok video critiquing Greta Gerwig's film Barbie.

Awards and achievements
Preceded by Grace-Anne Larschied	Miss Ohio Teen USA; 2022	Succeeded by Carolina Sola
