= Allie LaForce =

American sports journalist (born 1988)

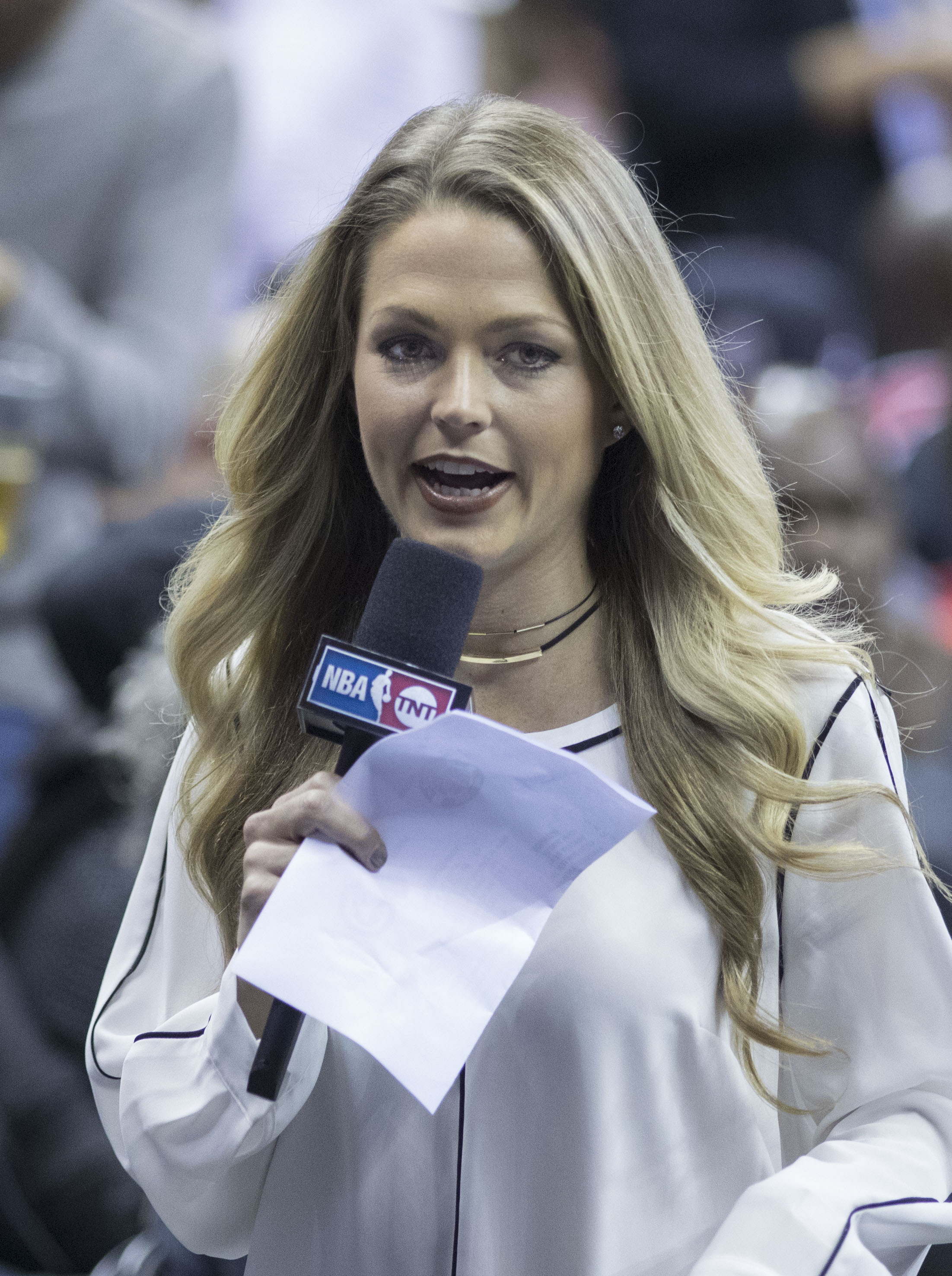
- LaForce in 2017
- Born: Alexandra Leigh LaForce; December 11, 1988 (age 37); Vermilion, Ohio, U.S.
- Education: Ohio University
- Height: 5 ft 8 in (1.73 m)
- Spouse: Joe Smith (m. 2015)
- Children: 2
- Beauty pageant titleholder
- Title: Miss Ohio Teen USA 2005; Miss Teen USA 2005
- Hair color: Blonde
- Eye color: Green

Alexandra Leigh LaForce (born December 11, 1988) is an American sports journalist and model. She is a reporter for TNT Sports, primarily working for the NBA on TNT until its conclusion in 2025. She was previously the lead reporter for SEC college football games, a courtside reporter for college basketball games, and the host of We Need to Talk on the CBS Sports Network. LaForce also worked as a broadcast sports anchor and reporter for the Cleveland, Ohio, FOX affiliate WJW. She won a 2011 Emmy award for anchoring FOX 8's Friday Night Touchdown high school football show. She was Miss Teen USA in 2005, and played college basketball at Ohio University. LaForce also won Miss Teen USA 2005 as a beauty queen.

== Early life and education ==
LaForce is from Vermilion, Ohio. When she was a child, she played basketball, volleyball, softball, ran track, and competed in beauty pageants. She attended Ohio University and played eight games her freshman year under head coach Semeka Randall as a guard on the Bobcats' women's basketball team.

== Career ==
=== Pageantry ===
LaForce began her career in pageantry after winning the Miss Ohio Teen USA 2005 title in September 2004, in her first attempt at the title. She went on to represent Ohio in the Miss Teen USA 2005 pageant held in Baton Rouge, Louisiana, on August 8, 2005. LaForce competed in the evening gown, swimsuit and final interview competitions, and was crowned Miss Teen USA 2005 by her predecessor Shelley Hennig, Miss Teen USA 2004 from Louisiana. Her mother Lesa LaForce (née Rummell) was Miss Ohio USA 1977.

Her winnings included a one-year modeling contract with Trump Modeling Management and a scholarship to the School for Film and Television in New York City. She also earned a guest appearance in the NBC soap opera Passions. LaForce made appearances throughout the United States, promoting causes such as drug and alcohol awareness, as well as continuing to attend high school in Ohio.

=== Sportscasting ===
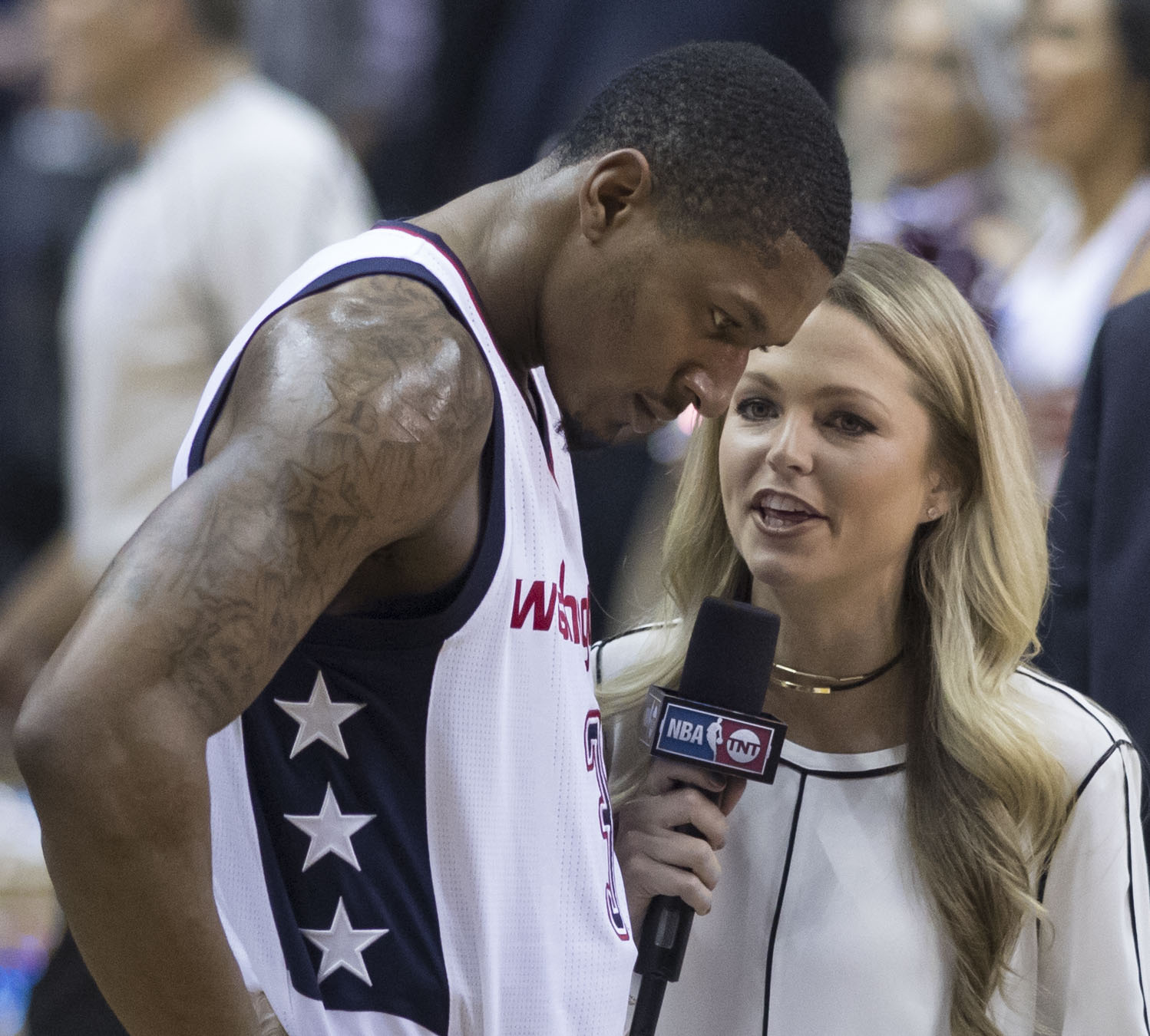
LaForce interviewing Bradley Beal in 2017

LaForce worked as a sideline reporter for Sportstime Ohio during the 2010 Mid-American Conference's football season, the 2011 MAC men's basketball tournament, and the 2011 OHSAA basketball championships. After college, she signed with Cleveland's Fox affiliate, WJW channel 8, as a sports anchor and reporter.

In April 2014, it was announced that LaForce would replace Tracy Wolfson as the sideline reporter for the SEC on CBS.

LaForce worked as a sideline reporter for NBA TV during the NBA Summer League in Las Vegas.

In June 2018, it was reported that LaForce would be leaving CBS Sports after the two sides could not come to terms on a new deal. LaForce still makes occasional appearances on CBS, due to her March Madness reporting role.

LaForce later signed a deal with Turner Sports to continue her role as a sideline reporter for the NBA on TNT and the NCAA Tournament. In 2022, LaForce works as a field-level reporter for MLB on TBS Tuesday Night.

== Personal life ==
LaForce is married to former MLB relief pitcher Joe Smith. Their first child, a son, was born in 2022. Their second son was born in 2025.
