= Miss Ohio Teen USA =

Beauty pageant competition

- Formation: 1983
- Type: Beauty pageant
- Headquarters: Cincinnati
- Location: Ohio
- Members: Miss Teen USA
- Official language: English
- Key people: Melissa Proctor-Pitchford, state pageant director
- Website: http://www.missohiousa.com

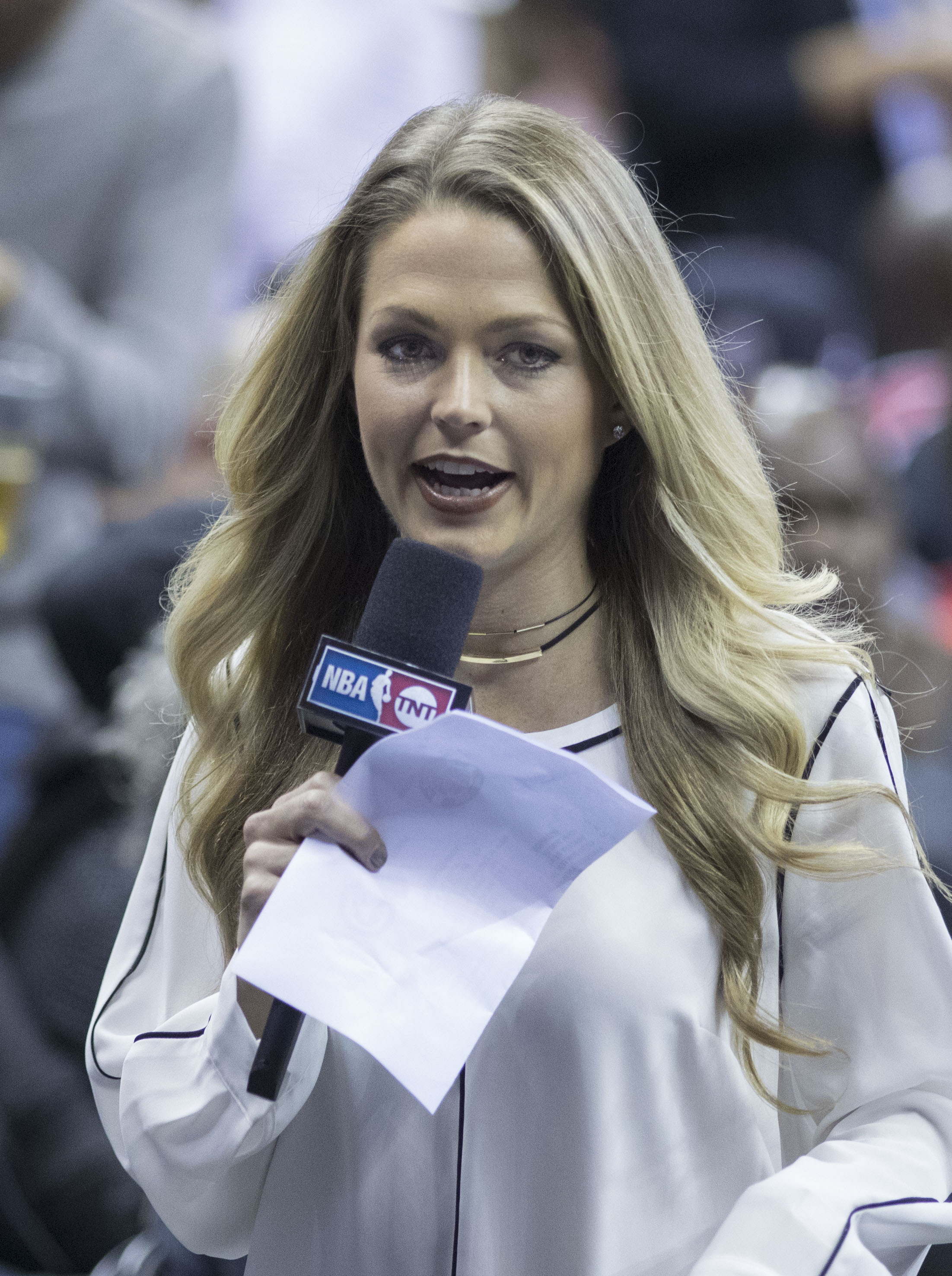
Allie LaForce, Miss Ohio Teen USA 2005 & Miss Teen USA 2005

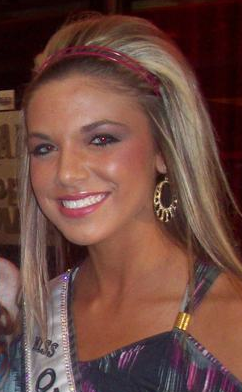
Chelsie Folden, Miss Ohio Teen USA 2008

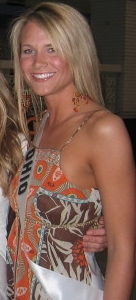
Stacy Offenberger, Miss Ohio Teen USA 1998 & Miss Ohio USA 2006

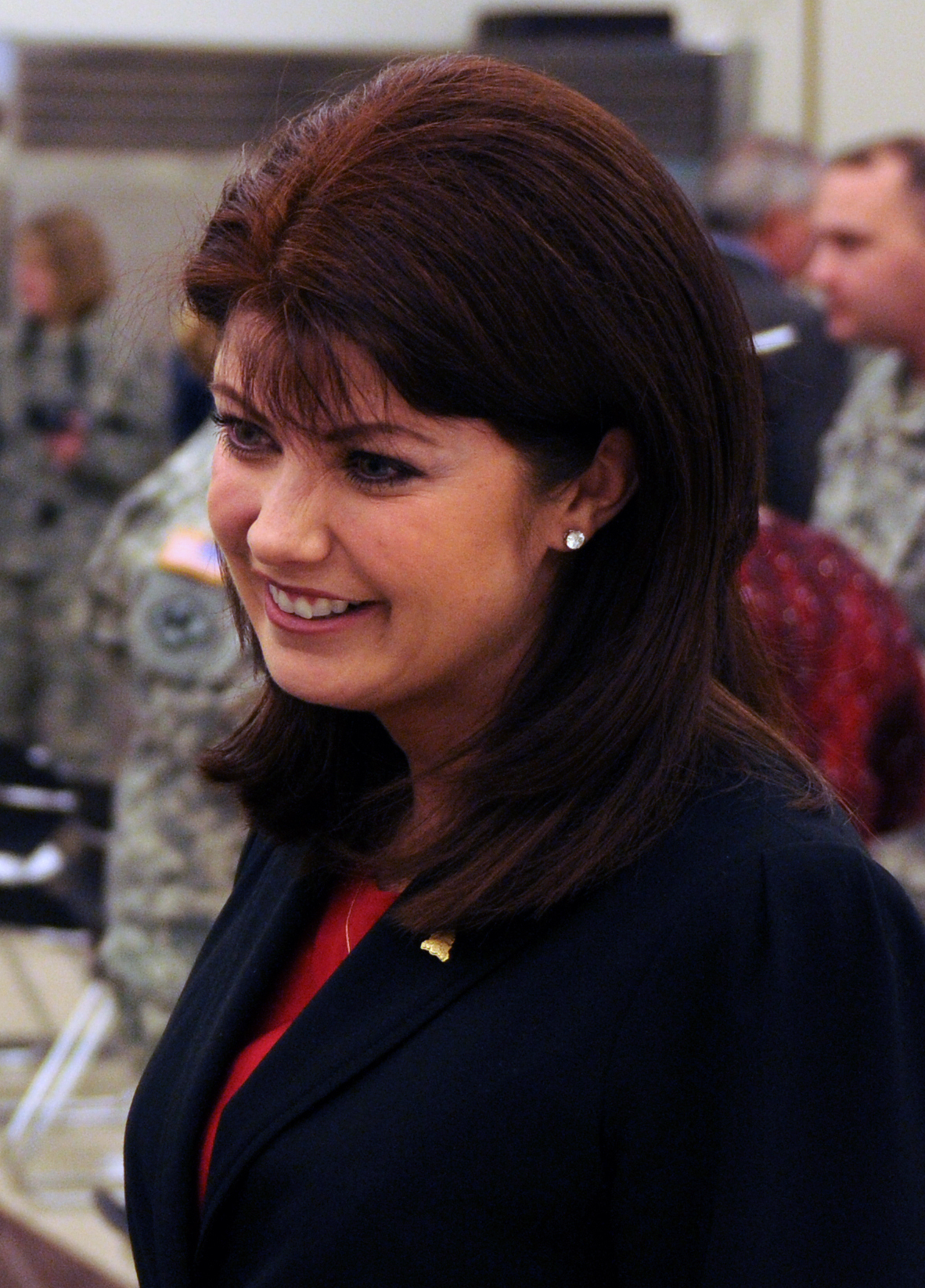
Rebecca Kleefisch, Miss Ohio Teen USA 1994

The Miss Ohio Teen USA competition is the pageant that selects the representative for the state of Ohio in the Miss Teen USA pageant and the name of the title held by that winner.

Most recently the pageant has been held in Springfield, Ohio and was previously held in Portsmouth for 14 years. Contestants compete in three competition segments: swimsuit, interview, and evening gown. Prizes include a scholarship to Lindenwood University.

Their first Miss Teen USA title came in 2005 Allie LaForce won the national crown, Ohio's first placement since 1993. LaForce went on to become a successful sports broadcaster.

The state has won one special award, Miss Congeniality in 1997. Ohio was one of the last ten states to make their first placement. The most recent placement came in 2022, when Kylan Darnell placed in the top 16.

Only two Miss Ohio Teen USA titleholders have won the Miss Ohio USA title and competed at Miss USA. The most recent of these is Stacy Offenberger, who placed third runner-up in the Miss USA 2006 pageant.

Emma Fossum of Dallas, TX was appointed Miss Ohio Teen USA 2026 on July 30th, 2026, after the open casting call from Thomas Brodeur, the new owner of the national pageant. She will represent Ohio at Miss Teen USA 2026.

== Results summary ==
=== Placements at Miss Teen USA ===
- Miss Teen USA: Allie LaForce (2005)
- 3rd runner-up: Helyna Park (2025)
- 4th runner-up: Kendall Fein (2012), Carolina Sola (2023)
- Top 12: Melissa Yust (1993)
- Top 15/16/20: Kelsey Stevens (2009), Olivia Turk (2016), Lily McLaughlin (2020), Kylan Darnell (2022), Emma Fossum (2026)

Ohio holds a record of 10 placements at Miss Teen USA.

=== Awards at Miss Teen USA ===
- Miss Congeniality: Christina Todd (1997)

== Winners ==
Year	Name	Hometown	Age^{1}	Local title	Placement at Miss Teen USA	Special awards at Miss Teen USA	Notes
2026	Emma Fossum	Dallas, TX	18	Miss Dallas Teen	Top 20		Previously Miss Texas' Teen 2025; 2nd runner-up at Miss America's Teen 2026; Semi-finalist at Miss Texas Teen USA 2024
2025	Helyna Barbara Park	Cleveland	17	Miss Cleveland Teen	3rd runner-up		
2024	Mackenzie Gibson	Fairfield County	18	Miss Fairfield County Teen			
2023	Carolina Sola	Gallipolis	17	Miss Ohio River Teen	4th runner-up		
2022	Kylan Darnell	Wheelersburg	18	Miss North Central Teen	Top 16		
2021	Grace-Anne Larschied	Lima	17	Miss Southeastern Ohio Teen			
2020	Lily McLaughlin	Zanesville	17	Miss North Central Ohio Teen	Top 16		
2019	Isabelle Jedra	Lexington	18	Miss Lexington Teen			
2018	Sofia Durina	Columbiana	16	Miss Buckeye State Teen			
2017	Emma Karle	Springfield Township	17	Miss Springfield Township Teen			
2016	Olivia Turk	Dublin	18	Miss Emerald City Teen	Top 15		
2015	Shelby Stapleton	Hilliard	16	Miss Hilliard Teen			
2014	Emma Rofkar	Curtice	17	Miss Heart of Ohio Teen			
2013	Brittany Reid	Springfield	18	Miss Central Ohio Teen			
2012	Kendall Fein	Loveland	17	Miss Southern Ohio Teen	4th runner-up		
2011	Morgan Smigel	Avon	16	Miss Avon Teen			
2010	Bridget Linton	Green	18	Miss Uniontown Teen			
2009	Kelsey Stevens	Aurora	18	Miss Aurora Teen	Top 15		Sister of Miss Ohio Teen USA 2003 Amanda Stevens
2008	Chelsie Folden	Wellston	16	Miss Wellston Teen			Later Miss Ohio World 2015; Top 22 at Miss World America 2015
2007	Rachel Epperly	Columbus	18	Miss Columbus Teen			
2006	Peyton McCormick	West Chester	17	Miss West Chester Teen			
2005	Allie LaForce	Vermilion	16	Miss Vermilion Teen	Miss Teen USA 2005		Daughter of Miss Ohio USA 1977 - Lesa Rummell
2004	Nicci Shannon	Cincinnati	18	Miss Greater Cincinnati Teen			
2003	Amanda Stevens	Aurora	17				Sister of Miss Ohio Teen USA 2009 - Kelsey Stevens
2002	Renee Jackson	Columbus	16				
2001	Angela Wilson	Columbus	17				
2000	Sarah Thompson	Columbus	17				
1999	Erika Moody	Columbus					
1998	Stacy Offenberger	Vincent	17				Later Miss Ohio USA 2006, 3rd runner up at Miss USA 2006
1997	Christina Todd	Columbus				Miss Congeniality	
1996	Tara Shaffer	Columbus					1st runner-up to Miss Ohio USA 2005
1995	Amber Vaughn	Marietta					
1994	Rebecca Reed	Waterville					Served as the 44th Lieutenant Governor of Wisconsin from 2011 until 2019.
1993	Melissa Yust	Cincinnati			Top 12		
1992	Tiffany Chaney	Hillsboro					
1991	Michelle Mouser	Huber Heights					Later Miss Ohio USA 1997
1990	Heather Wilpert	Columbus					
1989	Missy Crawford	Columbus					
1988	Teresa Merola	Pickerington					
1987	Christy Hoyt	New Concord					
1986	Michele Beane	Englewood					
1985	Meg Scranton	Columbus					
1984	Stephanie Viah	Columbus					
1983	Jamie Callarik	Martins Ferry	15				

^{1} Age at the time of the Miss Teen USA pageant
