= Melvin Carr =

American suspected serial killer (1915–1977)

- Born: Melvin Chelcie Carr; January 5, 1915; Wheelersburg, Ohio, U.S.
- Died: April 20, 1977 (aged 62); Indianapolis, Indiana, U.S.
- Cause of death: Carbon monoxide poisoning
- Other name: "Ted"

Details
- Victims: 3–5+
- Span of crimes: January 1967 – April 1977 (suspected)
- Country: United States
- State: Indiana

Melvin Chelcie Carr (January 5, 1915 – April 20, 1977) was an American murderer, rapist, and suspected serial killer from Indiana who accidentally killed himself after murdering three people with carbon monoxide in 1977.

== Earlier crimes ==
Carr was born on January 5, 1915, in Wheelersburg, Ohio. He worked as a construction engineer before joining the U.S. Army in 1942.

In 1947, Carr was charged with scamming a woman in a construction deal, as well as kidnapping and raping a woman who was hitchhiking in Kimball, Nebraska. In June 1949, while serving a five-year sentence for transporting a stolen car across state lines, he was diagnosed as "paranoid and a hopeless prospect for rehabilitation".

After his release, he worked as a businessman in Indianapolis, selling items imported from Mexico. Neighbors described him as a friendly and talented carpenter, albeit also "weird" and preoccupied with women. Carr was known to be a night owl who frequently chatted at a local 24-hour diner.

In March 1971, Carr was convicted of violating the Mann Act after he drove a 14-year-old girl to Mexico for sex. He was also suspected of raping another teenage girl around this time. For the former crime, he was sentenced to five years of imprisonment at USP Terre Haute. He later attempted to hire an inmate to murder the girl, an elderly woman, and two federal officers involved in his conviction, and was placed in maximum security. After his release, he served another prison sentence for embezzlement.

== Murders ==
Around 4:00 a.m. on April 20, 1977, Carr's wife entered the garage of their Indianapolis home and discovered Melvin dead on the floor, with three people (later identified as Sandra Harris, aged 17, Karen Mills, aged 24, and Robert Mills Jr. (Karen's son), aged 2) dead in the trunk of his car. It was determined that Carr had kidnapped them at gunpoint the night prior, raped Sandra and Karen, and gassed the three with a hose connected from the exhaust pipe to the trunk. Melvin, upon opening the trunk and holding a handkerchief to his face, accidentally succumbed to the same carbon monoxide he killed his victims with. Police said that Carr had been dating Karen.

== Suspected crimes ==
The discovery prompted police to investigate other murders in the area for which Carr may have been responsible. One suspicious case was the disappearance of Lois Williams, 35, and her daughter Karen, 17. On the night of January 25–26, 1967, Lois and Karen disappeared from their apartment in Indianapolis. Lois's vehicle was found abandoned at a service station owned by Carr with mud on the tires; no blood was found at the scene, and nothing was reported missing from their apartment.

After their disappearance, police suspected Carr's involvement and brought him in for questioning; however, he was released due to insufficient evidence. According to a letter Lois wrote to her father, Carr had raped her and attempted to buy her silence for $10,000. In 1977, police excavated Carr's backyard and garage in an unsuccessful attempt to locate the remains of the two women.

According to Carr's then-neighbors, Mr. and Mrs. Campbell, on the evening of January 25, 1967, they witnessed him leaving the service station with Lois. He returned two hours later, telling them that Lois had gone to a bar and wouldn't come out. The following morning, Carr's father ran to the neighbors and said that someone had robbed and beaten Melvin. He was in a daze, soaking wet, and covered with sand. After guiding Carr to his bedroom, the neighbors wanted to call the police, but Carr protested. Upon visiting the service station—the supposed site of the robbery—the door was found to be still locked from overnight, and nothing was moved besides Carr's vehicle, which had been washed thoroughly.

Months after the incident, Carr checked into a local hospital for dizzy spells. During this time, he called Mrs. Campbell, telling her to go over to his garage to make sure he locked the door because he had "valuable tools and things in there". Mrs. Campbell did not, as her husband was at work, and she was suspicious of Carr after Sgt. Robert Grubbs told her of his possible involvement in the disappearance of Lois. While he was in fact admitted to the hospital, the night of the call, a nurse found Carr and his clothes missing from his room. He returned the following morning, complaining of breathing problems.

Days after his death, a 7-year-old girl identified Carr as the man who had enticed her into a vehicle and sodomized her two years earlier. Police also considered him a suspect in an August 19, 1975, attack on three teenage girls from Indianapolis. While hitchhiking, they were driven to a cornfield in nearby Hancock County, where they were bound, raped, and slashed. However, the perpetrator of that crime was identified in 2024 as Thomas Edward Williams, a sex offender who died in a Texas prison in 1983. Forensic genealogy and DNA were used to link him to the crime.

== See also ==
- List of serial killers in the United States
- List of serial rapists
