= Redonda Miller =

American public health leader

- Born: Wheelersburg, Ohio, US
- Spouse: Albert Polito (m. 1999)

Academic background
- Education: BS, 1988, Ohio State University; MD, 1992, Johns Hopkins School of Medicine; MBA, Johns Hopkins University

Academic work
- Institutions: Johns Hopkins Hospital

Redonda Gail Miller is an American public health leader. After serving as chief resident, vice chair for clinical operations for the Department of Medicine and vice president for medical affairs, she became the first female president of Johns Hopkins Hospital in 2016.

== Early life and education ==
Miller was born to parents Rita Ann and Frank Louis Miller in Wheelersburg, Ohio. She attended Ohio State University for her Bachelor of Science degree with the original intent of becoming an engineer. However, after reflecting on a health crisis during her teenage years, she changed her major to pre-med. Miller graduated from Ohio State in 1988 and obtained her medical degree from the Johns Hopkins University School of Medicine in 1992. She originally intended to return to Ohio and practice cardiology or oncology but chose to remain in Maryland. Miller completed her medical internship and residency at Johns Hopkins Hospital and became an Assistant Chief of Service in 1996.

== Career ==
Miller joined the Johns Hopkins University School of Medicine faculty as an Assistant Professor of Medicine in 1997. After earning an MBA from the Johns Hopkins University, she began undertaking administrative roles, including Associate Program Director for the Osler Medical Residency Training Program, Assistant Dean for Student Affairs, and Vice Chair for Clinical Operations in the Department of Medicine. In 2006, she was promoted to associate professor of medicine and was elected to the Board of Governors of the Johns Hopkins Clinical Practice Association.

In 2009, she was informed that she was a finalist for the position of vice president of medical affairs and was asked to come in for multiple interviews over three days. She was officially granted the position and was appointed to it on July 1, 2009 and was succeeded by Sarah Clever as Assistant Dean for Student Affairs. In 2015, Miller was appointed to the position of senior vice president for medical affairs for the Johns Hopkins Health System. The following year, she became the first women president of Johns Hopkins Hospital. In this role, she organized the creation of care-coordination bundles, reduced the prescriptions of opioids, oversaw the launch of a high-value care committee, and advanced policies to promote more gender diversity.

In October 2020, Miller was elected a Member of the National Academy of Medicine.

== Personal life ==
Miller and her husband, pulmonologist Albert Polito, have two daughters together.
