= 2025 Little League Softball World Series =

Softball Tournament

Tournament details
- Dates: August 3–August 10
- Teams: 12

Final positions
- Champions: Johnstown, Pennsylvania; West Suburban LL
- Runners-up: Floyds Knobs, Indiana; Floyds Knobs Community Club LL

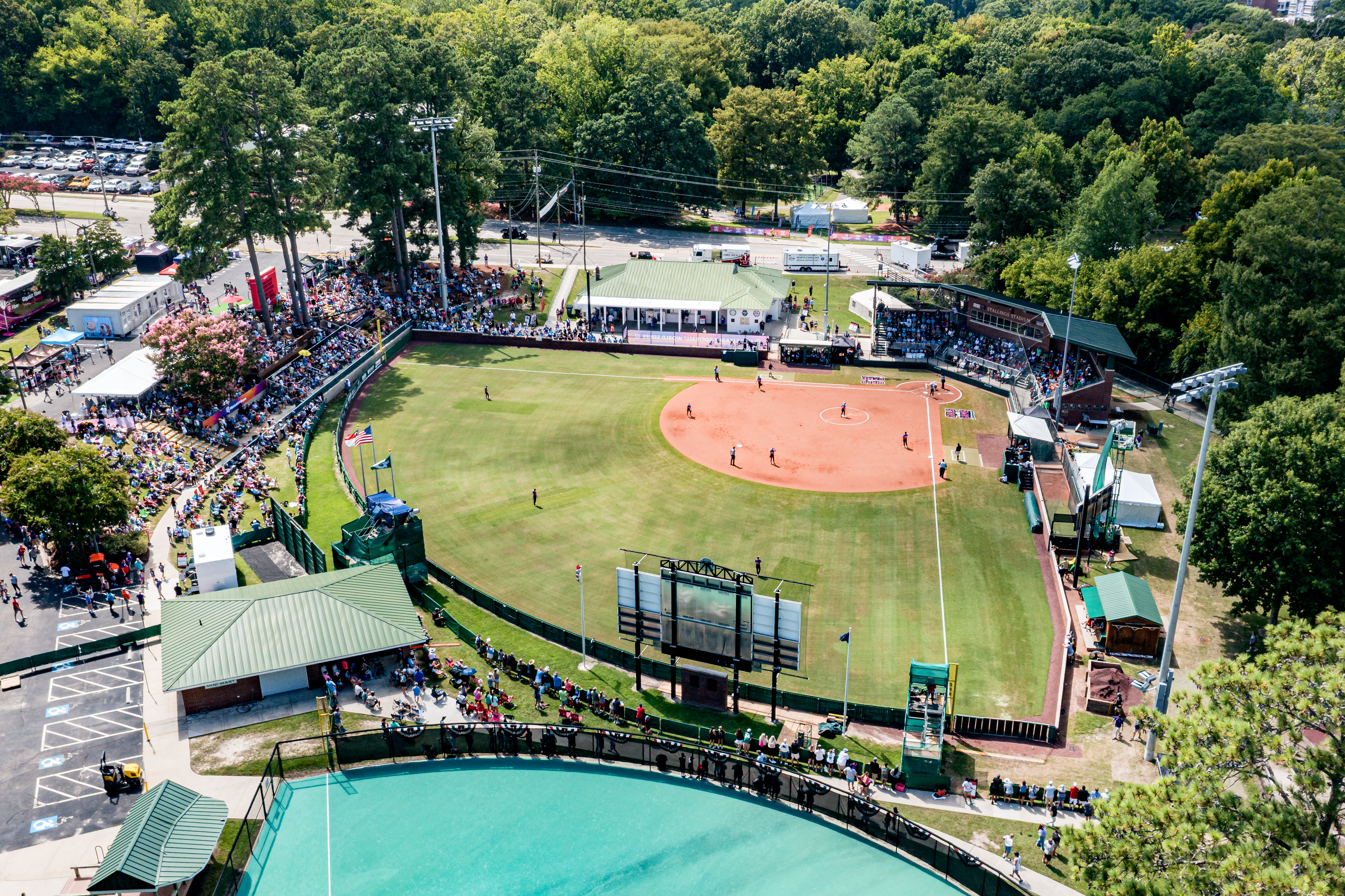
Stallings Stadium in Greenville, North Carolina hosted the tournament

The 2025 Little League Softball World Series was held in Greenville, North Carolina from August 3 to August 10, 2025.

== Teams ==
Each team that competed in the tournament came out of one of 12 qualifying regions.

Purple Bracket	Orange Bracket
Mid-Atlantic Region; Johnstown, Pennsylvania; West Suburban Little League	Asia-Pacific Region; Iwate, Japan; Tohoku Little League
New England Region; Guilford, Connecticut; Guilford Little League	Canada Region; Repentigny, Quebec; On Field LLS Little League
Northwest Region (Washington (state)) Mill Creek, Washington; Mill Creek Little League	Central Region; Floyds Knobs, Indiana; Floyds Knobs Community Club Little League
Southeast Region; Lake Mary, Florida; Lake Mary Little League	Europe-Africa Region; Prague, Czech Republic; Prague Little League
Southwest Region; Tulsa, Oklahoma; Tulsa National Little League	Host Region (North Carolina); Winterville, North Carolina; Pitt County Girls Softball Little League
West Region; Los Angeles, California; Westchester-Del Rey Little League	Latin America Region; São Paulo, Brazil; Cantareira Little League

== Eligibility controversy ==
During and after the World Series, allegations surfaced that the third-place finisher, Southwest Regional champion Tulsa National Little League, had not met the eligibility qualifications for participation in the Little League international tournament and had used ineligible players. Complaints were raised by parents, rival Little Leagues in Oklahoma, as well as opponents at the Southwest regional tournament. The allegations included accusations that Tulsa National Little League did not have players play the required number of regular-season games, or any regular-season games, in order to be eligible for the international tournament, and that Tulsa National used ineligible players who did not live within the league's geographic boundaries. While the Little League Southwest Region provided a brief statement confirming the team's eligibility, Little League International did not provide any comment.

== Results ==
=== Purple Bracket ===
==== Winner's Bracket ====
First Round
(Washington (state)) Washington	2
Florida	9
Connecticut	1
Pennsylvania	2

Second Round
Oklahoma	2
Florida	1
California	0
Pennsylvania	9

Winner's Bracket Final
Oklahoma	0
Pennsylvania	1

==== Elimination Bracket ====
First Round
(Washington (state)) Washington	10
California	0
Connecticut	0
Florida	9

Second Round
(Washington (state)) Washington	3
Florida	5
Elimination Bracket Final
Florida	1
Oklahoma	3

=== Orange Bracket ===
==== Winner's Bracket ====
First Round
North Carolina	4
Brazil	3
Canada	5
Czech Republic	4

Second Round
Indiana	3
North Carolina	5
Japan	6
Canada	1

Winner's Bracket Final
North Carolina	3
Japan	2

==== Elimination Bracket ====
First Round
Brazil	10
Canada	1
Czech Republic	0
Indiana	4

Second Round
Brazil	0
Indiana	2
Elimination Bracket Final
Indiana	1
Japan	0

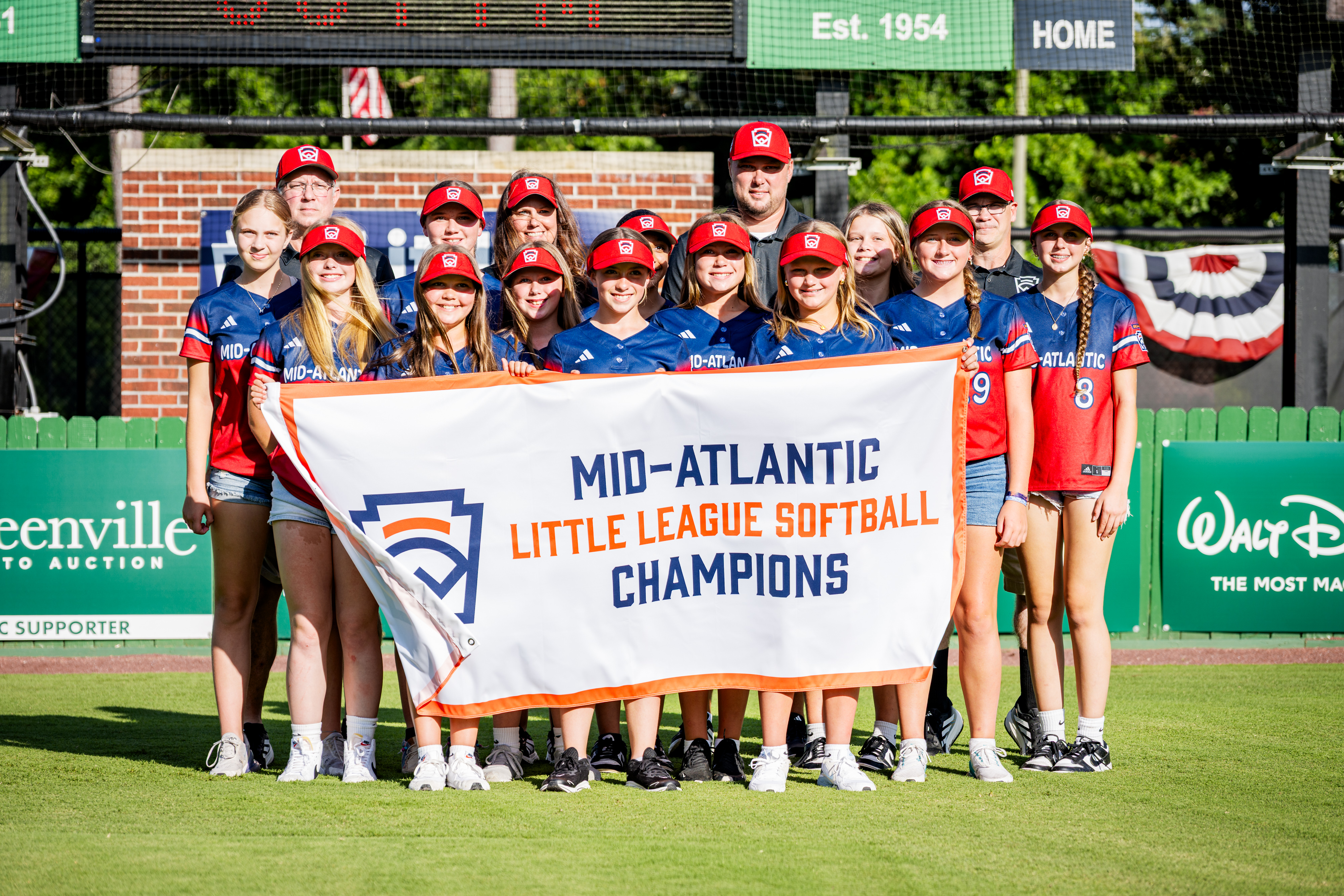
West Suburban Little League from Johnstown, Pennsylvania were crowned champions

=== Semifinals and Finals ===
Bracket Championships
Pennsylvania	4
Oklahoma	0
North Carolina	0
Indiana	2 (F/7)

Championship Game
Indiana	0
Pennsylvania	1
Third Place Game
North Carolina	2
Oklahoma	3

2025 Little League Softball World Series Champions
West Suburban Little League
Johnstown, Pennsylvania
