= Wheelersburg, Ohio =

- Census-designated place
- Nickname: "The BURG"
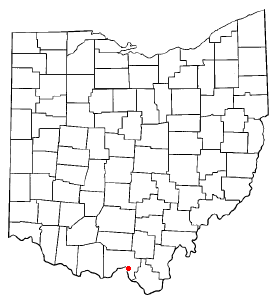
- Location of Wheelersburg, Ohio
- Coordinates: 38°44′42″N 82°49′53″W
- Country: United States
- State: Ohio
- County: Scioto
- Established: 1803

Area
  - Total: 5.90 sq mi (15.27 km^{2})
  - Land: 5.80 sq mi (15.03 km^{2})
  - Water: 0.093 sq mi (0.24 km^{2})
- Elevation: 653 ft (199 m)

Population (2020)
  - Total: 6,531
  - Density: 1,125/sq mi (434.5/km^{2})
- Time zone: UTC-5 (EST)
  - Summer (DST): UTC-4 (EDT)
- ZIP code: 45694
- Area code: 740
- FIPS code: 39-84588
- GNIS feature ID: 2393849

Wheelersburg is a census-designated place (CDP) in Scioto County, Ohio, United States. It lies along the northern banks of the Ohio River in southern Ohio. Wheelersburg is approximately 7 miles (11 km) east of Portsmouth and 14 miles (23 km) west of Ironton. It is in Porter Township. The population was 6,531 at the 2020 census.

== History ==
Wheelersburg was originally called Concord, and changed to Wheelersburgh in 1826. It was platted, with 42 lots, on October 8, 1824, by Rev. Dan Young and John Young. Reizin Enslow platted 7 lots on March 21, 1842. Wheelersburg was replatted with 105 lots on August 23, 1859, with the cause being taxation. J. B. and Ella McCoy platted 9 more lots on March 26, 1898. The present name honors Major Porter Wheeler, a pioneer settler. By 1833, Wheelersburg had about 150 inhabitants. A post office called Wheelersburgh was established in 1879, and the name was changed to Wheelersburg in 1893.

=== Tornado ===
In 1968, the town was devastated by an F5 tornado that killed seven people and injured 93. Golf and baseball sized hail, along with heavy rainstorms, and winds resulted in 550 homes being damaged. The damage to Scioto County was estimated to be $2,000,000.

=== Industry ===
Daniel and John Young erected a cotton factory in 1822.

== Geography ==
According to the United States Census Bureau, the CDP has a total area of 5.9 square miles (15 km^{2}), of which 5.8 square miles (15 km^{2}) is land and 0.1 square miles (0.26 km^{2}), or 1.36%, is water.

=== Climate ===
Wheelersburg suffered an F5 (maximum wind speeds of 261–318 miles per hour) tornado on April 23, 1968, in which seven people were killed and 93 people injured, costing nearly $5 million in damages. Wheelersburg is below the Ohio state average for tornado activity, however.

== Demographics ==
Historical population
Census	Pop.	Note	%±
2020	6,531		—
U.S. Decennial Census

As of the census of 2000, there were 6,471 people, 2,558 households, and 1,826 families residing in the CDP. The population density was 1,112.9 inhabitants per square mile (429.7/km^{2}). There were 2,755 housing units at an average density of 473.8 per square mile (182.9/km^{2}). The racial makeup of the CDP was 97.90% White, 0.28% African American, 0.63% Native American, 0.14% Asian, 0.02% Pacific Islander, 0.15% from other races, and 0.88% from two or more races. Hispanic or Latino of any race were 0.45% of the population.

There were 2,558 households, out of which 33.4% had children under the age of 18 living with them, 55.8% were married couples living together, 12.8% had a female householder with no husband present, and 28.6% were non-families. 25.4% of all households were made up of individuals, and 12.4% had someone living alone who was 65 years of age or older. The average household size was 2.43 and the average family size was 2.91.

In the CDP, the population was spread out, with 24.1% under the age of 18, 8.6% from 18 to 24, 26.2% from 25 to 44, 23.3% from 45 to 64, and 17.9% who were 65 years of age or older. The median age was 39 years. For every 100 females, there were 83.9 males. For every 100 females age 18 and over, there were 78.0 males.

The median income for a household in the CDP was $33,970 in 2000. In 2005, it was $34,400 compared with the state average of $43,493. The median income for a family was $41,200. Males had a median income of $35,000 versus $22,472 for females. The per capita income for the CDP was $18,787. About 10.7% of families and 14.2% of the population were below the poverty line, including 22.5% of those under age 18 and 6.6% of those age 65 or over.

== Public services ==
Wheelersburg residents are served by the Scioto County Public Library (Ohio)|Wheelersburg Branch, the Wheelersburg Local School District, and by a full-time as well as a volunteer fire department.

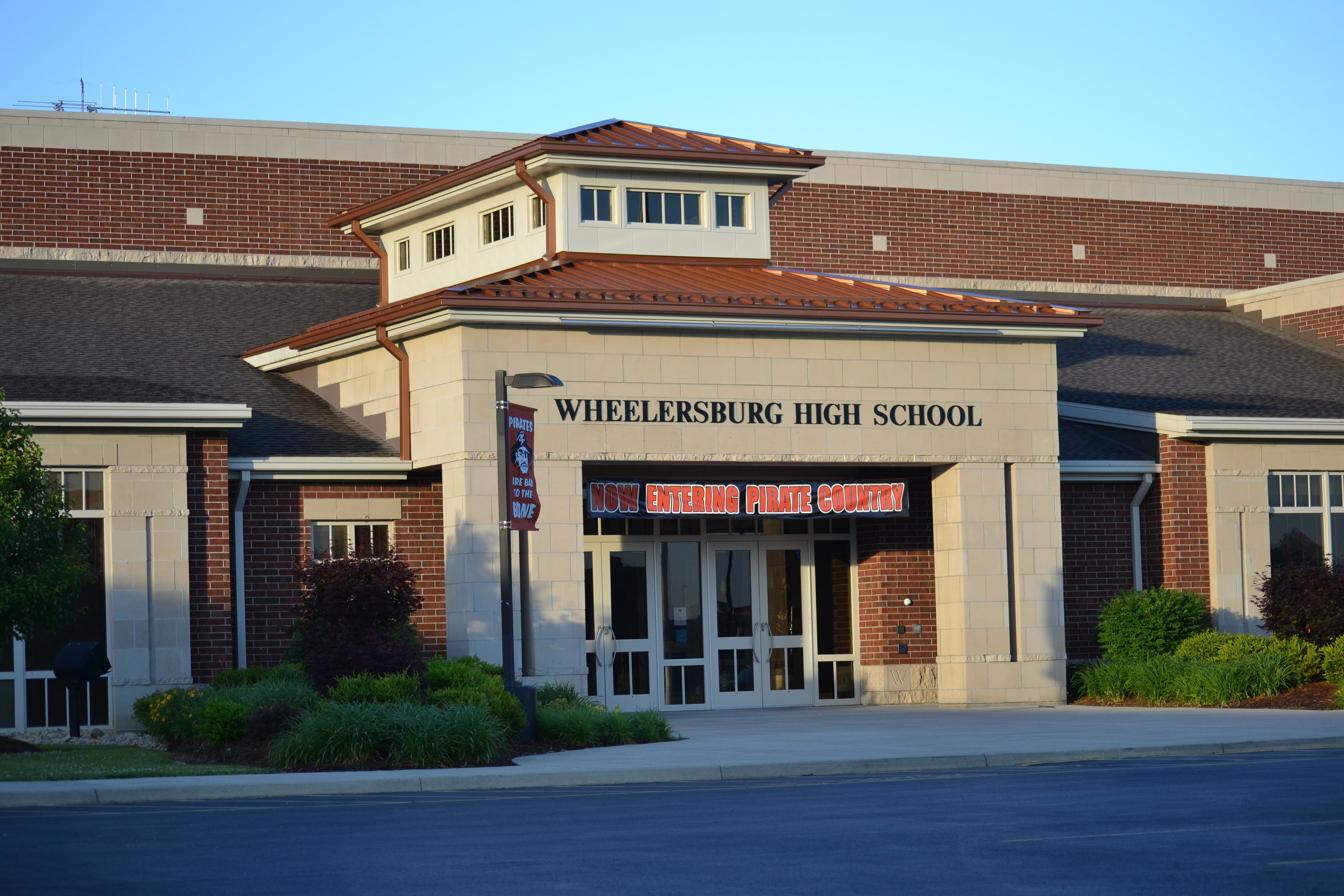
Wheelersburg High School

== Sports ==
Wheelersburg is a member of the Division II Southern Ohio Conference (S.O.C.). In 1989 and 2017, the high school football team won the OHSAA state championship.

Wheelersburg is the home of the 2001 and 2026 11-12-year-old, the 2003 13-14-year-old, the 2003 15-16-year-old, and the 2007 9-10-year-old state girls' softball champions.

Wheelersburg is also the home of the 2007 11-12-year-old boys Little League team that was invited to play an exhibition game in Williamsport, Pennsylvania during the Little League World Series festivities.

In 2012 the Wheelersburg high school boys baseball team received their second state title championship. Wheelersburg won back to back baseball championships in 2012 and 2013.

In 2018 11-12-year-old girls' softball team won the Little League World Series becoming the first team (boys or girls) to win the World Series from Ohio.

In 2011 the school's football stadium underwent renovations. The renovations were completed prior to the 2012 season and the first game in the new stadium was played against rival Ironton.

== Notable people ==
- Melvin Carr, suspected serial killer
- Kylan Darnell, 2022 Miss Ohio Teen USA
- Douglas Gunn, mayor of San Diego 1889-1891
- Matthew W. McFarland, United States District Judge
- Redonda Miller, public health leader
- Seth Morrison, lead guitarist for the Christian rock band Skillet
- Josh Newman, Major League Baseball pitcher

== See also ==
- List of cities and towns along the Ohio River
