= Bama Rush =

2023 documentary film

- Directed by: Rachel Fleit
- Produced by: Danny Gabai; Andrew Freston; Zachary Kislevitz; HBO Films
- Distributed by: HBO Max
- Release date: March 23, 2023
- Running time: 100 minutes
- Country: United States
- Language: English

Bama Rush is a 2023 American documentary film directed by Rachel Fleit. It follows four University of Alabama students in the summer of 2022 as they prepare for sorority bid day.

The film began streaming on Max on May 23, 2023.

== History ==
Director Rachel Fleit became interested in sororities during the MeToo Movement in 2018. Fleit and Vice Studios started the project after the fall of 2021 when the University of Alabama's rush process received attention on TikTok. Viewers of RushTok followed the complicated rush process at large Southern universities, such as the University of Alabama. Young women who were rushing the sororities shared OOTDs on TikTok, and the #rushtok hashtag accumulated billions of views. In 2022, the second year of RushTok, Fleit filmed the documentary.

Fleit told The New York Times that none of the subjects were paid to participate in the documentary and that the film crew did not record inside sorority houses. Fleit found her subjects by searching social media for incoming students who planned to rush, and though she contacted five hundred women, few opted to participate. The subjects went to extensive measures to increase their odds of acceptance into sororities, like making planning binders and hiring professional sorority consultants.

=== Resistance ===
Rumors of the documentary spread around the University of Alabama campus during the fall of 2022, when the production was filming. "It seems like there's a tradition of silence," Fleit told NPR. The sorority system at the University of Alabama did not participate in the film, nor did the National Panhellenic Conference. Fleit's documentary mentions "The Machine," a secret society that, according to Fleit, allegedly dominates the student government and reserves resources like football seats and scholarships for members of the Greek system. Fleit wore a disguise around campus for her safety. Shirts with the message "f*ck your documentary" were promoted by University of Alabama-affiliated Twitter users. One documentary subject, Shelby, stopped responding to production after arriving on campus out of concern for her reputation with the sorority houses.

19-year-old Marina Anderson said she was dismissed from rush in August after being wrongly accused of wearing a microphone.

== Reception ==
The film began streaming on Max on May 23, 2023. The Guardian wrote that it was "not the exposé on US sororities that traditionally tight-lipped sororities seemed to fear. Rather, it’s a collage of individual experiences in and around recruitment 2022."

=== Alopecia ===
Some viewers criticized Fleit for turning the camera on herself multiple times throughout the film to talk in a vlog-style confessional about her experiences with alopecia. Fleit stood by her decision to include her own insecurities. "It was extremely emotional, but it was necessary. I was asking these young women to be so vulnerable and honest with me in this film that I would have to do the same thing," Fleit said to NPR's Ayesha Rascoe. She shared the sentiment in a statement to The New York Times: “In order for me to express the empathy that I had for what these young women were up against. I needed to stand shoulder to shoulder with them and say, ‘You know what? Me, too. This is what I did to belong.’”
