= Miss Idaho USA =

Beauty pageant competition

- Formation: 1952
- Type: Beauty pageant
- Headquarters: Puyallup
- Location: Washington
- Members: Miss USA
- Official language: English
- Key people: Maureen Francisco
- Website: Official website

The Miss Idaho USA pageant is a competition that selects the representative for the state of Idaho in the Miss USA pageant and the name of the title held by that winner. It is currently produced by Pageants NW Productions based in Puyallup, Washington since 2007.

Idaho's first placement at Miss USA came in 1964 with Dorothy Johnson, the first African-American semi-finalist. Their second placement came in 1997 when former Miss Idaho Teen USA and Miss Teen USA 1989 Brandi Sherwood placed first runner-up. She later became the first woman to be crowned both Miss USA and Miss Teen USA when she succeeded winner Brook Lee who became Miss Universe. Sherwood has since pursued a career as an actress, and was a rotating model on The Price Is Right from 2002 to 2009. The third came in 2004 when former Miss Idaho Teen USA 1999 Kimberly Glyn Weible made the Top 10. Their fourth was in 2009, when Melissa Weber placed in the Top 15.

Idaho is currently third tied with North Carolina in number of former teens have competed in this pageant: ten, including Sherwood, and they are all from the same state. It is the largest former Teens competed in this pageant from the same state without being won the Teen title previously from other states. In addition, three have also competed at Miss America.

Katie Tetreault of Eagle was appointed Miss Idaho USA on June 30th, 2026 after the open casting call from Thomas Brodeur, the new owner of the national pageant. She will represent Idaho at Miss USA 2026.

== Gallery of titleholders ==
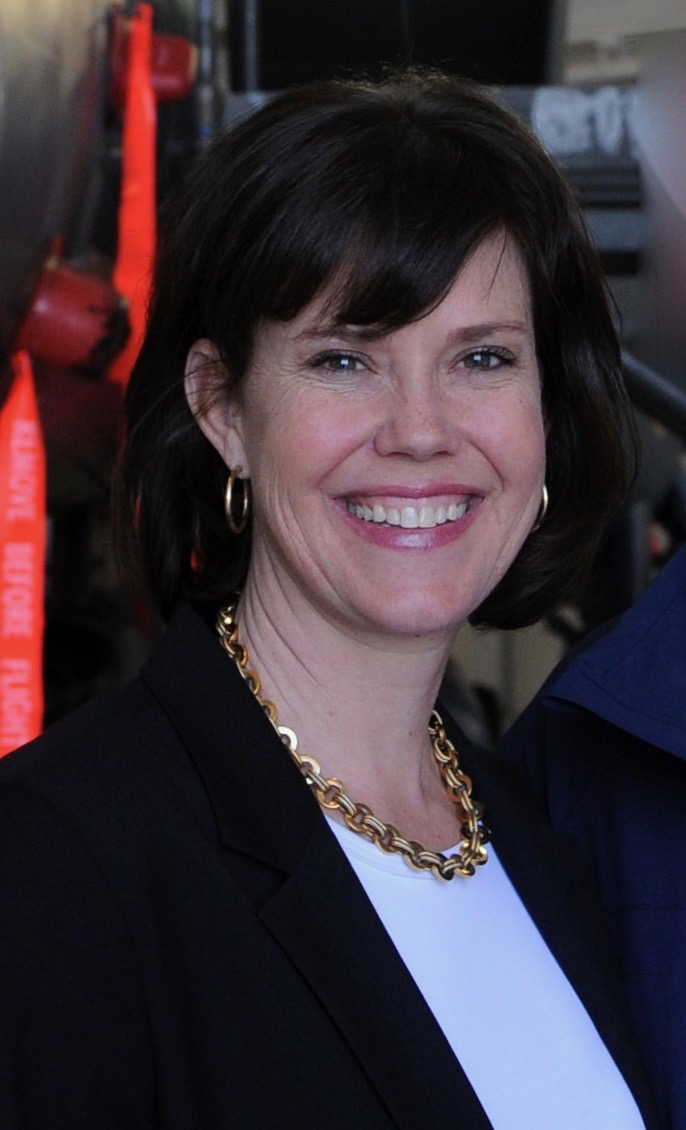
Lori Otter, Miss Idaho USA 1991

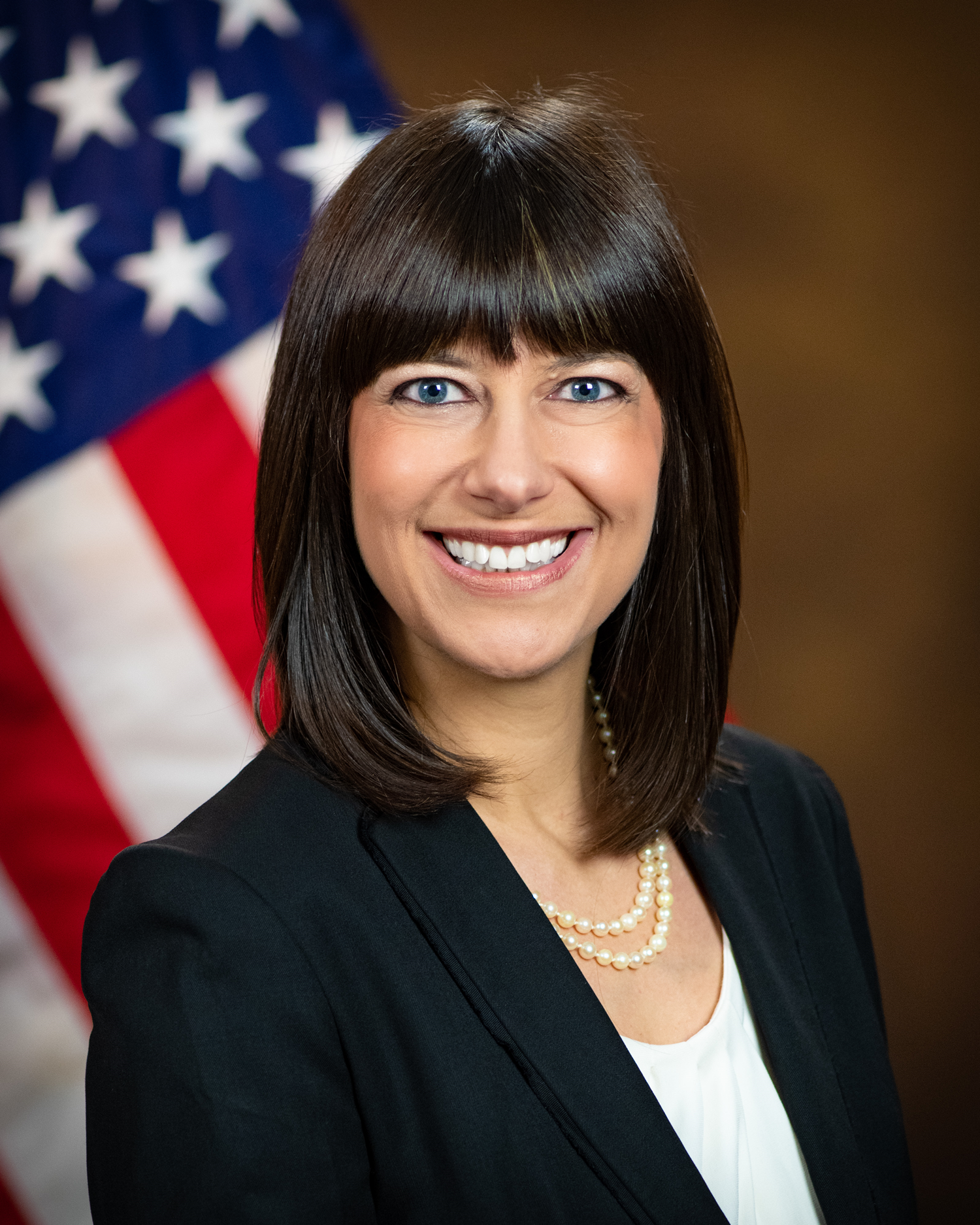
Elizabeth Prelogar, Miss Idaho USA 2001 & Miss Idaho Teen USA 1998

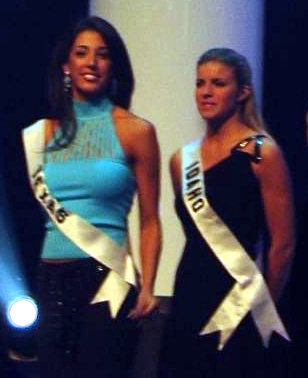
Kimberly Weible (right), Miss Idaho USA 2004

== Results summary ==
=== Placements ===
- 1st Runner-Up: Brandi Sherwood (1997), (Note: Brandi Sherwood was 1st runner-up at Miss USA, but succeeded the title when Brook Lee was crowned Miss Universe.) Kim Layne (2020)
- Top 10: Kimberly Weible (2004)
- Top 15/20: Dorothy Johnson (1964), Melissa Weber (2009), Jenny Ting Crawford (2025)

Idaho holds a record of 6 placements at Miss USA.

=== Awards ===
- Miss Congeniality: Sandra Baldwin (1967)
- People's Choice: Jenny Ting Crawford (2025)
- Best State Costume: Katie Tetreault (2026)

== Titleholders ==
Color key

- Declared as Winner
- Ended as runner-up
- Ended as one of the finalists or semifinalists

Year	Name	Hometown	Age (Note: Age at the time of the Miss USA pageant)	Local title	Placement at Miss USA	Special awards at Miss USA	Notes
2026	Katie Tetreault	Eagle	30	Miss Eagle		Best State Costume	
2025	Jenny Ting Crawford	Huntington Beach, CA	37	Miss Sunset	Top 20	People's Choice	
2024	Kaitlyn Widmyer	Coeur d'Alene	28	Miss Downtown Coeur d'Alene			
2023	Hannah Menzner	Boise	27	Miss Capital City			Previously Miss Idaho Teen USA 2014; second runner-up at National Sweetheart 2021 representing District of Columbia.
2022	Jordana Dahmen	Boise	26				
2021	Katarina Schweitzer	Boise	26				Top 10 at National Sweetheart 2019 representing Idaho, placed in Top 10
2020	Kimberly "Kim" Layne	Nampa	25		1st Runner-up		Previously Miss Idaho Teen USA 2012
2019	Shelby Lynn Brown	Boise	24				Contestant on The Proposal
2018	Téa Draganović	Boise	20				
2017	Cassandra "Cassie" Lewis	Moscow	25				
2016	Sydney Blue Halper	Moscow	21				
2015	Claira Belle Hollingsworth	Preston	22				Previously Miss Idaho Teen USA 2011
2014	Yvette Bennett	Boise	23				
2013	Marissa Wickland	Boise	20				Previously Miss Idaho Teen USA 2009
2012	Erna Palić	Boise	24				
2011	Erza Haliti	Meridian	20				Sister of Lorena Haliti, Miss Idaho Teen USA 2013
2010	Jessica Cathleen Hellwinkel	Boise	19				
2009	Melissa Weber	Boise	27		Top 15		
2008	Tracey Renee Brown	Post Falls	21				Previously Miss Idaho 2005
2007	Amanda Lynn Rammell	Rexburg	21				Previously Miss Idaho Teen USA 2003
2006	Allyson Swan	Twin Falls	22				
2005	Sade Aiyeku	Boise	24				
2004	Kimberly Glyn Weible	Eagle	22		Top 10		Previously Miss Idaho Teen USA 1999; sister of Miss Idaho 2002 Christi Weible
2003	Lana Wright	Pocatello	25				
2002	Hilary Renee Ball	Nampa	23				
2001	Elizabeth Barchas	Boise	20				Solicitor General of the United States from 2021 to 2025: Previously Miss Idaho Teen USA 1998; Later Miss Idaho 2004.
2000	Brooke Jennifer Gambrell	Boise	26				Previously Miss Idaho 1995
1999	Amy Jo Ambrose	Boise	18				Previously Miss Idaho Teen USA 1995
1998	Melinda Grassmick	Boise	18				
1997	Calley Slagle	Boise	18		did not compete		Originally first runner-up, assumed the title when Brandi Sherwood inherited the Miss USA title
1997	Brandi Dawn Sherwood	Idaho Falls	26		1st runner-up		Became Miss USA 1997 after Brook Lee won Miss Universe 1997; Previously Miss Idaho Teen USA 1989 and Miss Teen USA 1989. Frequent rotating Barker's Beauty on the game show The Price Is Right from 2002 to 2009
1996	Tracy Yarbrough						Previously Miss Idaho 1994
1995	Amy Michelle Tolzmann	Coeur D'Alene					
1994	Trenna Wheeler	Idaho Falls					
1993	Natalie Nukaya	Idaho Falls					
1992	Cheryl Lin Myers	Boise	25				
1991	Lori Jean Easley	Kimberly	23				Wife of Idaho Governor Butch Otter
1990	Cindy Estey						
1989	Kelli Bean	Nampa					
1988	Kay Kinsey	Idaho Falls					Wife of former NBA player Karl Malone
1987	Vicki Lynn Hoffman	Idaho Falls					First runner-up at Miss Idaho USA 1986; Mother of Madison Andreason, Miss Idaho's Outstanding Teen 2021 and Miss Idaho 2024
1986	Kelli Catron	Coeur d'Alene					
1985	Sheri Rose	Boise	24				
1984	Valencia Bilyeu	Pocatello	20				
1983	Kerry Damiano	Coeur D'Alene					Finalist at Miss Arizona USA 1982
1982	Valerie Marie Stephan	Boise					
1981	Lori Ditch	Boise					
1980	Marta Vincen	Boise					
1979	Lori Jukich	Boise					
1978	Suzette Sanford	Pocatello					
1977	Leslie Kingon	Coeur D'Alene					
1976	Cheryl Gilbert	Boise					
1975	Charlene McArthur	Pocatello					
1974	Darla Jan Dowden	Pocatello					
1973	Karen Hammond	Rexburg					
1972	Lianne Fulmer	Coeur D'Alene					
1971	Kris Riordan	Nampa					
1970	Kathy Cravens	Nampa					
1969	Karen Ryder	Rigby					
1968	Anna Marie Evenson	Post Falls					
1967	Sandra Jean Baldwin	Coeur d'Alene	19			Miss Congeniality	
1966	Did not compete						
1965	Did not compete						
1964	Dorthy Johnson	Pocatello			Semi-finalist		
1963	Did not compete						
1962	Kinne Holland	Nampa	18				
1961	Delcene Rositer						
1960	Margie Davis						
1959	Pat Sherburne						
1958	Jeanette Ashton						
1954-1957	Did not compete						
1953	Patricia Rose Carter						
1952	Cherrie Jean Lindsey						
