= Denny Méndez =

Dominican-Italian actress, model and beauty pageant titleholder

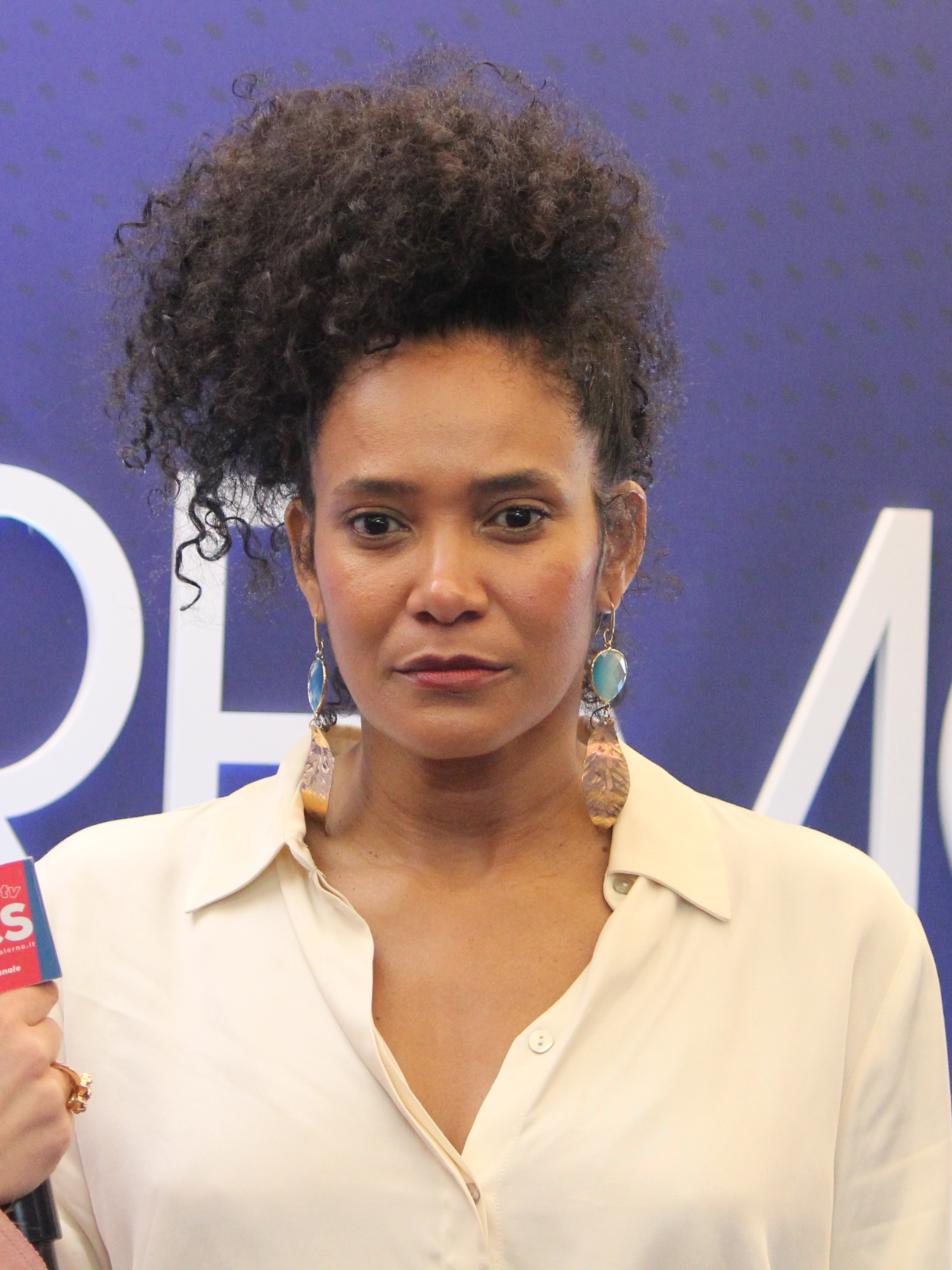
Denny Mendez in 2026

Denny Andreína Méndez de la Rosa (born 20 July 1978 in Santo Domingo, Dominican Republic) is a Dominican-Italian actress, model and beauty pageant titleholder who represented Italy at Miss Universe 1997 and placed in the Top 6.

== Early life ==
A native of the Dominican Republic, Méndez relocated to Montecatini Terme, Italy, as a very young child with her mother in search of a better life. Many of Méndez's aunts had relocated to Italy and had married Italian citizens, and after divorcing Denny's biological father, her mother relocated to Italy and married an Italian man whom she met while he was on vacation in the Dominican Republic. Méndez, who had no formal training as a model, was studying to become a tourist guide before enrolling in the pageant.

== Miss Italy 1996 ==
Her first venture in the beauty pageant circuit occurred when she was a candidate for in the title of Miss Dominican Republic 1996 on 16 December 1995, when she represented the Distrito Nacional and placed second runner-up. After another attempt to win the title the following year, she decided to return to Italy where she entered the Miss Italia pageant.

Her election as Miss Italia on 7 September 1996 in the Italian town of Salsomaggiore caused a minor scandal throughout that nation. It was the first time that a woman of non-Italian ancestry was elected to represent the country in an international beauty pageant and some Italian citizens saw it as a wake-up call for Italy to close its borders to further immigration. Two members of the judging panel were suspended for saying that a black woman could not represent Italian beauty. The news of the first black Miss Italy was carried to millions overseas via the popular African-American periodical Jet magazine. The author of the article was quoted in American Outlook:

"Denny Méndez ... born in the Dominican Republic, was named Miss Italy after receiving nine million telephone votes from the television audience." Nine million Italians voted to shatter the prism of race, just by watching a TV beauty pageant and phoning in their votes! Beauty is, indeed, in the eye of the beholder, and the eyes of the world today are quite capable of seeing past skin color. The Italian people's choice was Denny Méndez, notwithstanding the objections of a pageant official who said, "A black girl can't be Miss Italy. It's not in the rules."

Upon being elected Miss Italia, Méndez responded to the controversy with a brief reply:

"I know I don't represent Italian beauty, but they elected me," she said, "so what am I supposed to do—refuse?"

Denny was selected as one of the 10 semifinalists in Miss Universe 1997 in Miami Beach, Florida, U.S. on 16 May 1997. Despite winning the semifinals with the highest overall score and entering the top six in first place, her interview answer was not enough to advance her to the final three. The crown was eventually won by Miss USA Brook Mahealani Lee. But the publicity from the pageant helped her land modeling jobs among many of Europe's leading fashion houses and magazines.

== Post-pageant career ==
Méndez is a popular television personality in Italy. She remains very active in the modeling world and has become an actress. Besides several theatrical productions, she has guest starred on many Italian sitcoms, dramas, and feature films; she had a small role in the film Ocean's Twelve (2004), which starred George Clooney, Brad Pitt, and Matt Damon. She also appeared in the thriller-film, The Fanatic (2019).

Awards and achievements
Preceded by (Mexico) Vanessa Guzmán	Miss Universe 4th Runner-Up; 1997	Succeeded by (Colombia) Silvia Ortiz
Preceded by Anna Valle	Miss Italia; 1996	Succeeded by Claudia Trieste
