= Miss Teen USA 1989 =

7th edition of the Miss Teen USA competition

- Date: July 25, 1989
- Presenters: Wil Shriner; Marcia Strassman; Angela Visser
- Entertainment: Kid Creole and the Coconuts
- Venue: Orange Pavilion, San Bernardino, California
- Broadcaster: CBS; KCBS-TV
- Entrants: 51
- Placements: 10
- Winner: Brandi Sherwood; Idaho
- Congeniality: Heidi Jo Langseth; North Dakota
- Photogenic: Stacey Harris; Maryland

Miss Teen USA 1989, the 7th Miss Teen USA pageant, was televised live from Orange Pavilion, San Bernardino, California on July 25, 1989. At the conclusion of the final competition, Brandi Sherwood of Idaho was crowned by outgoing titleholder Mindy Duncan of Oregon.

This was the second and final year the pageant was held in San Bernardino. It was hosted by Wil Shriner, with color commentary from Marcia Strassman and Angela Visser, Miss Universe 1989.

== Contestant notes ==
- Brandi Sherwood won the 1997 Miss Idaho USA title and competed in the 1997 Miss USA pageant, where she placed first runner-up to the eventual winner, Hawaii's Brook Mahealani Lee. Lee became Miss Universe 1997 a couple of months later, so Brandi assumed the Miss USA title. She is the only Miss Teen USA winner to hold the Miss USA title. She later became a Barker's Beauty model on the daytime game show The Price Is Right.
- Kristie Dawn Hicks (Kentucky) later won the 1995 Miss Kentucky title and competed at Miss America 1996.
- Miss Nevada Teen USA 1989 was initially Heather McLeod, who was disqualified because she had competed at Miss California Teen USA the same year. McLeod was replaced by Stacey Bentley only days before the national pageant was held.
- Three other contestants later competed at Miss USA:
  - Tracy Kennick (Utah) - Miss Utah USA 1996 (Top 10 semifinalist at Miss USA 1996)
  - Jana Durban (Colorado) - Miss Colorado USA 1993
  - Stephanie Satterfield (Virginia) - Miss Virginia USA 1993
