= Brandi Sherwood =

American model and pageant winner

- Born: January 13, 1971 (age 55); Idaho Falls, Idaho, U.S.
- Occupations: Model; actress
- Spouse: Dean Cochran (m. 1999)
- Beauty pageant titleholder
- Title: Miss Idaho Teen USA 1989; Miss Teen USA 1989; Miss Idaho USA 1997; Miss USA 1997
- Major competitions: Miss Idaho Teen USA 1989; (Winner); Miss Teen USA 1989; (Winner); Miss Idaho USA 1997; (Winner); Miss USA 1997; (1st Runner-Up) (Note: Sherwood was originally first runner-up, but became Miss USA after the original titleholder, Brook Lee, won Miss Universe. Due to pageant protocol, Miss USA must relinquish her title in the event she wins Miss Universe.)

Brandi Sherwood (born January 13, 1971) is an American model, actress and beauty queen who won Miss USA and Miss Teen USA pageants. She was born in Idaho Falls, Idaho. She was originally 1st runner-up at Miss USA 1997 and later was crowned Miss USA when the original winner was crowned Miss Universe. And (at age 18) she was crowned Miss Teen USA 1989 and was a frequent rotating Barker's Beauty model on the US daytime television game show The Price Is Right from 2002 to 2009.

== Pageant history ==
In 1997, she won the Miss Idaho USA title and represented her state at Miss USA 1997. She became first runner-up to eventual Miss USA, Brook Mahealani Lee. Sherwood assumed the Miss USA title when Lee was crowned Miss Universe 1997 in Miami. Sherwood held the titles of Miss Idaho Teen USA and Miss Idaho USA. To date, Sherwood is the only woman to have held the titles of both Miss Teen USA and Miss USA.

During her reign as Miss USA, Sherwood worked with Special Olympics. She has also worked with the DARE program and continues to volunteer her time speaking to students about resisting drugs and violence.

== Life after pageants ==
In 1996, Sherwood allegedly was invited on a modeling trip with six other women to Brunei by her friend, former Miss USA Shannon Marketic. Marketic later claimed in a lawsuit against the ruling family of Brunei that she was held against her will for 30 days. The lawsuit was thrown out because of the royal family's immunity as heads of state.

She also has acted in a few movies including Shark Zone, released in 2003.

== Lawsuit against The Price Is Right ==
Sherwood was a model on the long-running game show The Price Is Right. In 1999, she married movie actor Dean Cochran. The Price Is Right host Drew Carey announced on the show's February 13, 2009 broadcast that Sherwood and Cochran were expecting twins in the summer, with a scheduled due date of June 12, 2009. Sherwood took time off for the rest of Season 37 and into Season 38, as episodes began taping in late May to early June 2009. On February 23, 2010, the show declined her request to be booked again on the show. She filed a lawsuit against FremantleMedia in 2010 and won a reported $775,000 in November 2012, later increased elevenfold to over $8.5 million to include punitive damages.

On March 12, 2013, Sherwood was stripped of her lawsuit winnings when the trial court ordered that the case be reheard due to a recent state Supreme Court decision. Judge Kevin Brazile said that in February, two months after Sherwood declared victory, a state Supreme Court ruling affirmed the defense's argument that Brazile should have instructed the jury to determine whether pregnancy discrimination was a "substantial motivating factor" in the producers' decision. An undisclosed out-of-court settlement was reached in 2016.

== Filmography ==
Year	Title	Role	Notes
2004–2008	The Bold and the Beautiful	Spectra Model / Audition Model	
2003	Shark Zone	Carrie	
2001	Soulkeeper	Buxom Brunette	
2000	Son of the Beach	Vega	1 episode
1999	Diagnosis Murder	Andrews	1 episode
1995	The Single Guy		1 episode
1990	Star Trek: The Next Generation		1 episode, scene deleted
