= Miss USA 1997 =

46th Miss USA pageant

- Date: February 5, 1997
- Presenters: George Hamilton; Marla Maples Trump
- Venue: Hirsch Memorial Coliseum, Shreveport, Louisiana
- Broadcaster: CBS, KSLA-TV
- Winner: Brook Lee (Hawaii) (Relinquished); Brandi Sherwood (Idaho) (Assumed)
- Congeniality: Napiera Groves (District of Columbia)
- Photogenic: Audra Wilks (Virginia)

Miss USA 1997 was the 46th Miss USA pageant, held at Shreveport, Louisiana in January and February, 1997. Delegates arrived in the city on January 19, the preliminary competition was held on February 2, 1997 and the final competition on February 5, 1997. The event, held at the Hirsch Memorial Coliseum was broadcast live on CBS.

At the conclusion of the final competition, Brook Lee of Hawaii was crowned by outgoing titleholder Ali Landry of Louisiana, becoming the fourth Hawaiian to win the Miss USA pageant and the first win in 19 years, since Judi Andersen in Miss USA 1978. After Lee won the Miss Universe 1997 title three months later, first runner-Up Brandi Sherwood of Idaho immediately inherited the Miss USA title on the night of the latter competition. Sherwood became the first Miss Teen USA winner (Miss Teen USA 1989) and the third Miss Teen USA state delegate in a row to hold the Miss USA title. Upon Sherwood inheriting the Miss USA 1997 title, she also became the first Idaho delegate to hold the Miss USA title.

The pageant was held in Shreveport, Louisiana for the first time, having been held in South Padre Island, Texas the previous three years and in Wichita, Kansas the four years prior. The new location was announced in August 1996, and then reigning Miss USA, Louisiana native Ali Landry, was invited to attend the official contract signing.

The pageant was hosted by George Hamilton for the only time, and Marla Maples Trump, soon-to-be ex-wife of pageant owner Donald Trump, offered colour commentary for the only time. Randy Newman provided entertainment during the competition.

Just prior to the final event it was announced that broadcaster CBS had entered a partnership with Trump, becoming half-owners of the Miss USA pageant and the associated Miss Teen USA and Miss Universe competitions.

While the delegates were in Louisiana, over sixty corporate sponsors provided funding for events, which included dinners, receptions and cocktail parties. There were over three hundred volunteers involved. The delegates were involved in more than forty-five hours of rehearsals prior to the preliminary competition and final show.

This was the first year in which delegates were allowed to choose whether they wanted to wear one-piece or two-piece bathing suits for the preliminary and final swimsuit competitions. In previous years, the delegates were all assigned to only wear either one or the other.

== Results ==
=== Placements ===
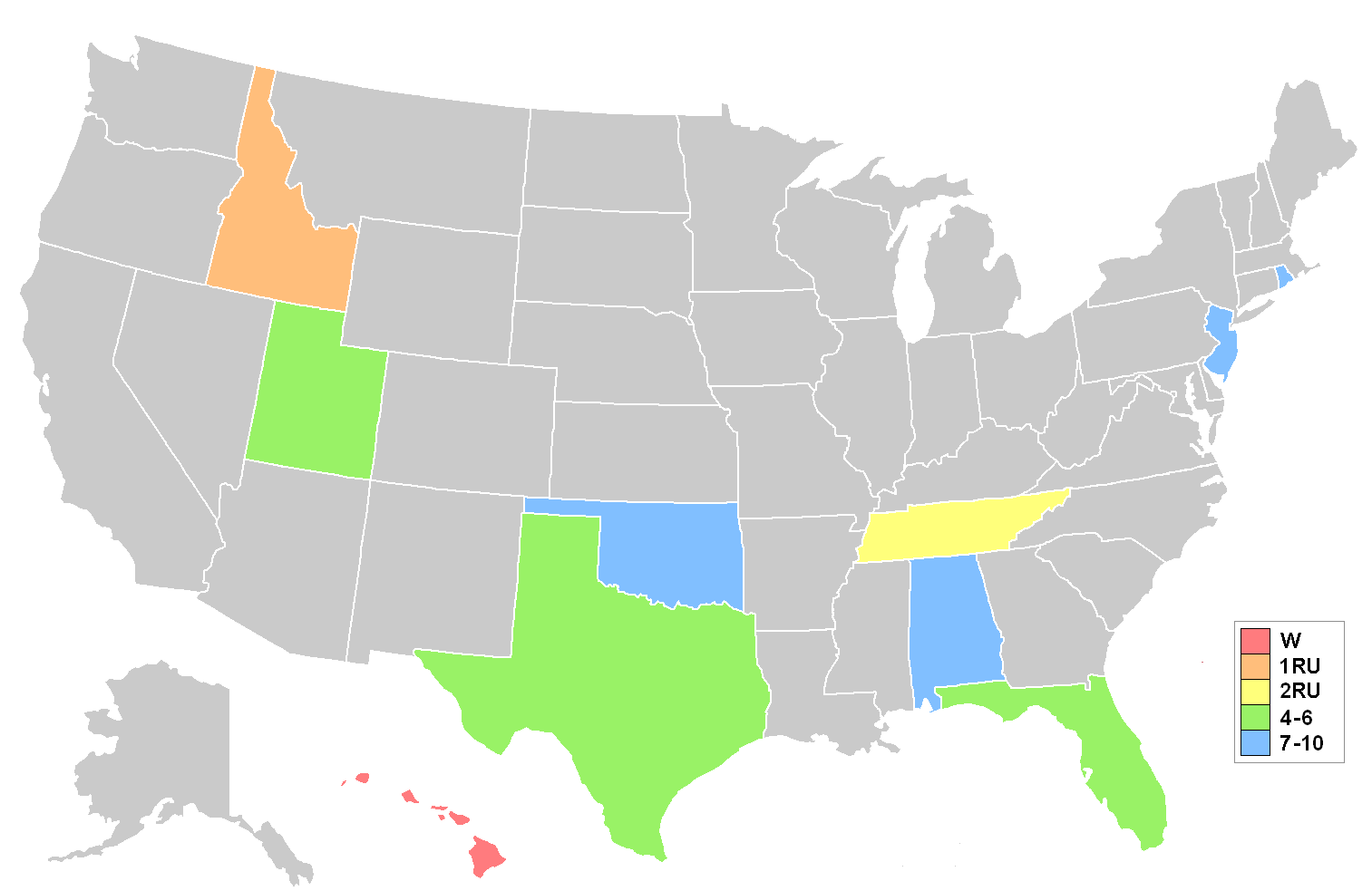
Map showing placements by state

Final results	Contestant
Miss USA 1997	Hawaii – Brook Lee
1st Runner-Up	Idaho – Brandi Sherwood ∞
2nd Runner-Up	Tennessee – Towanna Stone
Top 6	Florida – Angelia Savage; Texas – Amanda Little; Utah – Temple Taggart
Top 10	Rhode Island – Claudia Jordan; Alabama – Autumn Smith; New Jersey – Jennifer Makris; Oklahoma – Trisha Stillwell

∞ Lee won Miss Universe 1997. Due to protocol, Lee relinquished her title as Miss USA 1997. 1st runner-up, Brandi Sherwood, replaced her as Miss USA.

=== Special awards ===
- Miss Congeniality - Napiera Groves (District of Columbia)
- Miss Photogenic - Audra Wilks (Virginia)
- Best in Swimsuit - Angelia Savage (Florida)

== Delegates ==
The Miss USA 1997 delegates were:

- Alabama – Autumn Smith
- Alaska – Rea Bavilla
- Arizona – Jessica Elizabeth Shahriari
- Arkansas – Tamara Henry
- California - Alisa Marie Kimble
- Colorado – Damien Munoz
- Connecticut – Christine Pavone
- Delaware – Patricia Gauani
- (Washington, D.C.) District of Columbia – Napiera Groves
- Florida – Angelia Savage
- (Georgia (U.S. state)) Georgia – Denesha Reed
- Hawaii – Brook Lee
- Idaho – Brandi Sherwood
- Illinois – Jennifer Salinas
- Indiana – Tricia Nosko
- Iowa – Shawn Marie Brogan
- Kansas – Kathryn Taylor
- Kentucky – Rachyl Hoskins
- Louisiana – Nikole Viola
- Maine – Stephanie Worcester
- Maryland – Ann Coale
- Massachusetts – Jennifer K. Chapman
- Michigan – Jennifer Reed
- Minnesota – Melissa Hall
- Mississippi – Arleen McDonald
- Missouri – Amanda Jahn
- Montana – Christin Didier
- Nebraska – Kimberly Jane Weir
- Nevada – Ninya Perna
- New Hampshire – Gretchen Durgin
- New Jersey – Jennifer Makris
- New Mexico – Tanya Harris
- (New York (state)) New York – Ramona Rueter
- North Carolina – Crystal McLaurin-Coney
- North Dakota – Lauri Marie Gapp
- Ohio – Michelle Mouser
- Oklahoma – Trisha Stillwell
- Oregon – Heather Williams
- Pennsylvania – Cara Bernosky
- Rhode Island – Claudia Jordan
- South Carolina – Casey Cristin Mizell
- South Dakota – Jamie Marie Swenson
- Tennessee – Towanna Stone
- Texas – Amanda Little
- Utah – Temple Taggart
- Vermont – Lisa Jean Costantino
- Virginia – Audra Wilks
- (Washington (state)) Washington – Sara Nicole Williams
- West Virginia – Natalie Bevins
- Wisconsin – Tara Johnson
- Wyoming – Stacy Dawn Cenedese

== See also ==
- Miss Universe 1997
- Miss Teen USA 1997
