= Miss Idaho Teen USA =

Beauty pageant competition

- Formation: 1983
- Type: Beauty pageant
- Headquarters: Puyallup
- Location: Washington
- Members: Miss Teen USA
- Official language: English
- Key people: Maureen Francisco
- Website: Official website

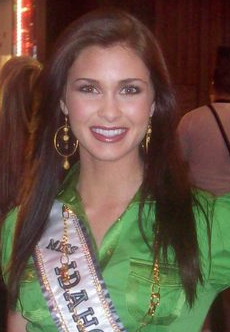
Shareece Pfeiffer, Miss Idaho Teen USA 2008

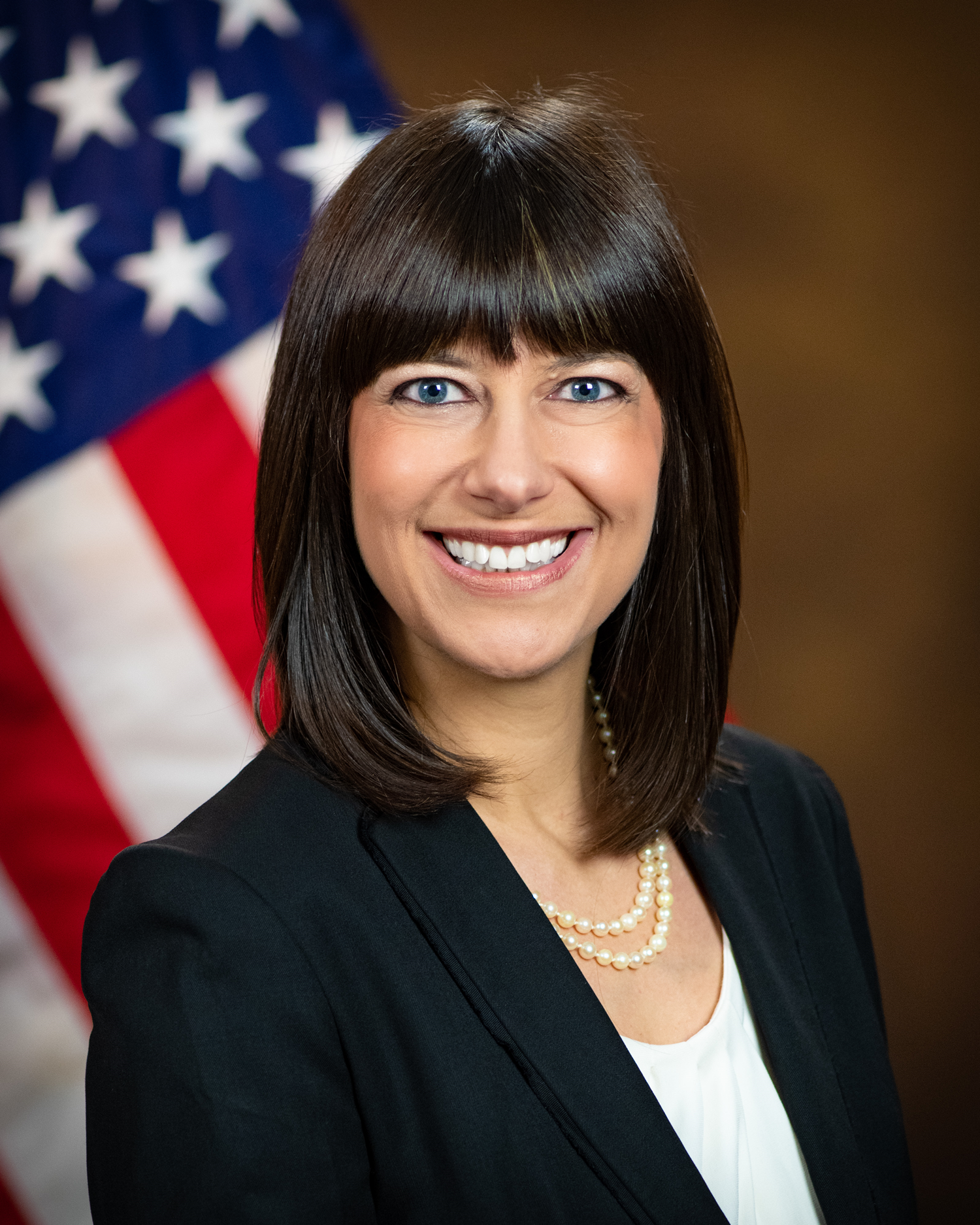
Elizabeth Prelogar, Miss Idaho USA 2001 & Miss Idaho Teen USA 1998

The Miss Idaho Teen USA competition is the pageant that selects the representative for the state of Idaho in the Miss Teen USA pageant.

Idaho has only placed four times and as such is one of the least successful states at Miss Teen USA. Their first placement, and the state's only placement for the first twenty-five years of the competition, was in 1989 when Brandi Sherwood won the Miss Teen USA title becoming the 7th state that won the title for the first time. Sherwood went on to make history as the first Miss Teen USA to be crowned Miss USA.

Nine other Idaho teens went on to win the Miss Idaho USA crown, including Sherwood and Elizabeth Barchas, one of only seven women to compete in Miss Teen USA, Miss USA and Miss America.

Shayleena Wijerathna of Corona, CA was appointed Miss Idaho Teen USA on June 30th, 2026 after the open casting call from Thomas Brodeur, the new owner of the national pageant. She will represent Idaho at Miss Teen USA 2026.

== Results summary ==
=== Placements ===
- Miss Teen USA: Brandi Sherwood (1989)
- 1st runner-up: Jenna Beckstrom (2022)
- 4th runner-up: Shareece Pfeiffer (2008)
- Top 20: Drew Abdul-Wahab (2025), Shayleena Wijerathna (2026)

Idaho holds a record of 5 placements at Miss Teen USA.

=== Awards ===
- Miss Congeniality: Shari Lynn Short (2000), Hosanna Kabakoro (2010)

== Winners ==
- Declared as Winner
- Ended as runner-up
- Ended as one of the finalists or semifinalists

| Year | Name | Hometown | Age^{1} | Local title | Placement at Miss Teen USA | Special awards at Miss Teen USA | Notes |
|---|---|---|---|---|---|---|---|
| 2026 | Shayleena Wijerathna | Corona, CA | 18 | Miss Anaheim Teen | Top 20 | | |
| 2025 | Drew Abdul-Wahab | Huntington Beach, CA | 19 | Miss Huntington Beach Teen | Top 20 | | |
| 2024 | Aly Feely | Eagle | 19 | Miss Tri-Counties Teen | | | |
| 2023 | Angelina Ryan | Boise | 17 | Miss Treasure Valley Teen | | | |
| 2022 | Jenna Beckstrom | Eagle | 17 | | 1st runner-up | | |
| 2021 | Kallie Peck | Preston | 16 | | | | |
| 2020 | Sabrina Ripley | Boise | 18 | | | | |
| 2019 | Tess Romani | Boise | 18 | | | | |
| 2018 | Jacy Uhler | Boise | 17 | | | | |
| 2017 | Gabriella Simpson | Boise | 18 | | | | |
| 2016 | Kate Pekuri | Boise | 17 | | | | 1st runner-up at Miss Utah USA 2019 pageant |
| 2015 | Chaise Goris | Eagle | 18 | | | | |
| 2014 | Hannah Menzner | Boise | 18 | | | | Later Miss Idaho USA 2023 |
| 2013 | Lorena Haliti | Meridian | 16 | | | | Sister of Erza Haliti, Miss Idaho USA 2011 |
| 2012 | Kimberly Layne | Nampa | 17 | | | | Later Miss Idaho USA 2020; 1st Runner-Up at Miss USA 2020 |
| 2011 | Claira Hollingsworth | Preston | 18 | | | | Later Miss Idaho USA 2015 |
| 2010 | Hosanna Kabakoro | Twin Falls | 17 | | | Miss Congeniality | |
| 2009 | Marissa Wickland | Boise | 16 | | | | Sister of Miss Idaho Teen USA 2006: Later Miss Idaho USA 2013 |
| 2008 | Shareece Pfeiffer | Idaho Falls | 18 | | 4th runner-up | | |
| 2007 | Krista McNeal | Sandpoint | 18 | | | | |
| 2006 | Brianne Wickland | Boise | 16 | | | | |
| 2005 | Alyssa Sams | Boise | 15 | | | | |
| 2004 | Angel Soltero | Pocatello | 17 | | | | |
| 2003 | Amanda Rammell | Rexburg | 18 | | | | Later Miss Idaho USA 2007 |
| 2002 | Katrina Lynn Siddoway | Boise | 16 | | | | |
| 2001 | Hayley VanCleave | Boise | 19 | | | | |
| 2000 | Shari Lynn Short | Bonners Ferry | 14 | | | Miss Congeniality | |
| 1999 | Kimberly Glyn Weible | Eagle | 17 | | | | Later Miss Idaho USA 2004; Top 10 at Miss USA 2004 |
| 1998 | Elizabeth Barchas | Boise | 18 | | | | Triple Crown winner: Later Miss Idaho USA 2001; Later Miss Idaho 2004 |
| 1997 | Kimberly Whiting | Burley | 16 | | | | |
| 1996 | Suzan Dandeneau | Nampa | 17 | | | | |
| 1995 | Amy Jo Ambrose | Wendell | 17 | | | | Later Miss Idaho USA 1999 |
| 1994 | Sarah Elizabeth Polk | Post Falls | 18 | | | | 1st runner-up at Miss Idaho USA 1998, Miss Congeniality. Represented Idaho in Miss Oktoberfest 2000, Miss Congeniality |
| 1993 | Jan Cartwright | Bonners Ferry | 16 | | | | |
| 1992 | Amanda Greenway | Caldwell | 15 | | | | Later Mrs. Idaho America 2004 under her married name, Amanda Peterson. |
| 1991 | Angelina Madrey | Boise | 17 | | | | |
| 1990 | Jody Walker | Boise | 17 | | | | |
| 1989 | Brandi Sherwood | Idaho Falls | 18 | | Miss Teen USA 1989 | | Later Miss Idaho USA 1997; Miss USA 1997 and actress/entertainer |
| 1988 | Renee Griggs | Boise | | | | | |
| 1987 | Luanne Relyea | Meridian | | | | | |
| 1986 | Kathryn Comba | Boise | | | | | |
| 1985 | Tracey Shirley | Mountain Home | | | | | |
| 1984 | Laura Bates | Boise | | | | | |
| 1983 | Tammy Hamilton | Nampa | 17 | | | | |

^{1} Age at the time of the Miss Teen USA pageant
