= Nicolet Law =

American personal injury law firm

Nicolet Law Accident & Injury Lawyers
- No. of offices: 24
- Offices: Wisconsin, Minnesota, North Dakota, Iowa
- Major practice areas: Personal Injury Law
- Date founded: 2007 (Hudson, Wisconsin)
- Founder: Russell Nicolet
- Website: nicoletlaw.com

Nicolet Law is an American personal injury law firm headquartered in Hudson, Wisconsin. It was founded in 2007 by Russell Nicolet.

== History ==
Nicolet Law was founded in 2007 by Russell Nicolet after his graduation from law school at William Mitchell College of Law in St. Paul, Minnesota. The firm has grown from a single-room office in Hudson, Wisconsin and has expanded to having offices in Wisconsin, Minnesota, and North Dakota. In December 2024, the firm moved to an expanded office in Milwaukee.

Nicolet Law is known for its frequent use of billboards as part of its marketing strategy. A cartoon version of Russell Nicolet's bald head, sunglasses, and beard were featured on over 100 billboards in Minnesota in 2025. The firm's first billboard went up in 2008. The firm ran an ad in local markets during Super Bowl LIX featuring local comedian Charlie Berens.

== Legal rankings ==
Nicolet was selected by the Wisconsin Law Journal's editorial staff to its "power list" of Wisconsin personal injury attorneys in 2023 and 2024 along with his brother Benjamin. The firm was voted the best overall firm in Eau Claire.
