= Shark Zone =

- Directed by: Danny Lerner
- Written by: Danny Lerner; Sam Parish
- Produced by: Boaz Davidson; George Gale; Danny Lerner; David Varod
- Starring: Dean Cochran; Alan Austin; Brandi Sherwood; Velizar Binev; Luke Leavitt
- Edited by: Cari Coughlin
- Release date: October 14, 2003
- Running time: 91 minutes

Shark Zone is a 2003 American direct-to-video horror film, directed by Danny Lerner and released on October 14, 2003. When a shoal of ferocious great white sharks threatens a small beach community, Jimmy (who encountered the deadly sharks a decade prior and was left the sole survivor of his diving crew) must hunt them down all the while dealing with a group of criminals who sees a priceless treasure that happens to be at the bottom of the ocean as well as in the breeding grounds for the sharks.

== Plot ==
A group of divers go searching for gold in a sunken ship. Among them are Jimmy Wagner and his father, but a group of great white sharks attack the group, leaving Jimmy as the only survivor. Ten years later, Jimmy has married a woman named Carrie, and has a son Danny, although is still guilty over his father's death, and has developed a fear of sharks. A man named Volkoff asks him to help him search for gold in the same ship, although Jimmy declines the offer. The town mayor, John Cortell, asks Jimmy to patrol the beaches for sharks to prepare for an upcoming beach party. Jimmy agrees to do so, eventually witnessing a shark attack that claims the lives of several people.

Assigned to kill the sharks, Jimmy, and a group of his diver friends go shark hunting in order to kill them, but the sharks attack them, and eat everybody except Jimmy. At a party one night, two young adults are eaten, and Jimmy rejects another offer from Volkoff. Jimmy and one of his partners return to patrolling the beaches, although after another shark attack claims the lives of three teenagers, Jimmy's partner manages to tag one of the sharks with a tracking device. Jimmy and his partner use the tracking device to track the sharks, eventually blowing several of them up with bombs from a helicopter. He is still uncertain whether or not they were all killed. Jimmy is called and threatened by Volkoff unless he meets him in private.

Volkoff once again asks Jimmy to help him locate the ship, although he refuses once more. As a result, Volkoff has his henchmen kidnap Danny, forcing Jimmy to arrive at the boat where Volkoff and Danny are. Jimmy helps three of Volkoff's men locate the ship, although they're all quickly killed by sharks. Jimmy and another henchman then go, although Jimmy stabs the henchman with a knife before returning to the ship and engaging in a fight with Volkoff. During the fight, an electric cable is damaged, creating a fire, and trapping Danny, and Jimmy is shot, although he still manages to gain the upper hand, and knock Volkoff overboard, resulting in him being eaten by the sharks. Jimmy rescues Danny, and the two use a motorboat to escape the ship as it explodes. Jimmy and Danny then return to the mainland, and reunite with Carrie.

== Cast ==
- Dean Cochran as Jimmy Wagner / Young Jimmy Wagner
- Alan Austin as Mayor John Cortell / Andrew Wagner
- Brandi Sherwood as Carrie Wagner
- Velizar Binev as Mr. Volkoff
- Luke Leavitt as Danny Wagner
- Plamen Zahov as Boris
- Alexander Petrov as Nikolay
- Boiko Boyanov as Vlad Poseroff
- Dimitar Dimitrov as Ilya
- Svilena Vlangova as Riley
- Yulian Vergov as Billy
- Violeta Markovska as Tesha

== See also ==
- List of killer shark films
