= Hosanna Kabakoro =

Hosanna Noelle-Leilani Kabakoro
- Born: June 24, 1992 (age 34); Seoul, South Korea
- Beauty pageant titleholder
- Title: Miss Idaho Teen USA 2010
- Hair color: Black
- Eye color: Brown
- Major competition: Miss Teen USA 2010

Hosanna Noelle-Leilani Kabakoro (born June 24, 1992) was an editor of Mai Life Style, the South Pacific's first style and fashion magazine. Kabakoro also served on the Board of Vision Fiji, was a spokesperson for the Fiji Water Foundation and now works as a model locally. At the age of 21, she was one of the youngest editors of a major publication in the South Pacific but only worked for the magazine for less than 6 months.

== Biography ==
Kabakoro was born in Seoul, South Korea where her father attended seminary, and spent her childhood in Savusavu and Cakaudrove, Fiji. Kabakoro and her family moved to the United States following the 2000 Fijian coup d'état. She holds dual Fiji-United States citizenship.

In 2008 Kabakoro interned for U.S. Senator Larry Craig who later appointed her a United States Senate Page for the 110th Congress. Kabakoro attended the United States Senate Page School for one month.

Upon returning to Idaho, Kabakoro worked as a correspondent for the Magic Valley Times News and interned at KLIX-FM Radio in Idaho, and also in the News Department at Southern Idaho's CBS affiliate KMVT. She was home schooled and has attended College of Southern Idaho.

=== Awards and commendations ===
After relocating to Twin Falls, Kabakoro became active in public service, with an emphasis on relocated and at-risk-immigrant youth. She is a recipient of the Bronze, Silver, and Gold Medal Congressional Awards, a Jefferson Award recipient and the President's Award. Kabakoro is also the recipient of a $30,000.00 Discover Scholarship, and was named a Philanthropic Education Organization Scholar. In 2009, former First Lady Laura Bush formally recognized Kabakoro for her public service and presented her with the Prudential Spirit of Community Award.

Kabakoro holds a Girl Scouts' Gold Award and was named one of ten Girl Scouts Young Woman of Distinction in 2010. The organization appointed her a lifetime member of the National Girl Scout Advisory Board.

In 2010 Kabakoro was nominated as one of Idaho Governor Butch Otter's Brightest Stars.

Kabakoro has written for UNLOCK MAGAZINE, and appeared on the covers of two national magazines, (Justine Magazine and Savvy Magazine) She is a representative and spokesperson for the H.Y.P.E. Movement. In November 2010, Kabakoro was a featured speaker at the Destined for Greatness Conference in Salt Lake City, Utah.

In December 2010, Three Dot Dash announced Kabakoro as one of their 26 Global Youth Leaders. In August 2011, Kabakoro was appointed a Delegate to the 2011 One Young World Conference held in Zurich, Switzerland, and attended by notable world leaders including Desmond Tutu, Sir Bob Geldoff, and others.

=== Pageants ===
In October 2009, Kabakoro competed in her first beauty pageant and was crowned Miss Idaho Teen USA 2010. She also received the Miss Photogenic award and was voted Miss Congeniality by the other contestants. In July 2010 she represented Idaho in the Miss Teen USA 2010 pageant held at Atlantis Resort in the Bahamas and won the national Miss Congeniality award.

Awards and achievements
Preceded by Marissa Wickland	Miss Idaho Teen USA; 2010	Succeeded by Claira Hollingsworth
