= Miss USA =

Beauty contest

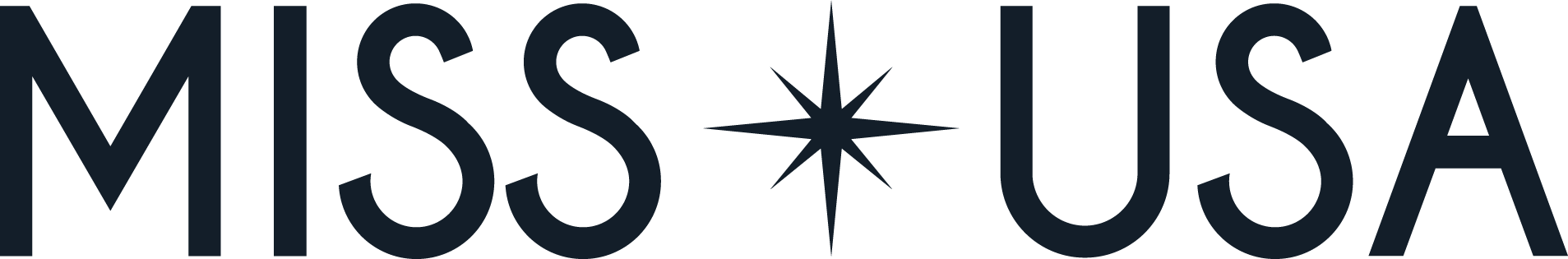
- Type: Beauty pageant
- Parent organization: Miss Universe Organization
- Headquarters: New York City, U.S.
- Country represented: United States
- Qualifies for: Miss Universe
- First edition: 1952
- Most recent edition: 2026
- Current titleholder: Justus Kelley; Virginia
- Owners: Jakkaphong Jakrajutatip (2022–present); Raul Rocha (2024–present)
- Chairman, president and CEO: Thom Brodeur
- National directors: Elise Banks-Lovely; Laura Clark
- Language: English
- Website: www.thenextmissusa.com

Miss USA is an American beauty pageant that has been held annually since 1952 to select a US entrant for Miss Universe. The Miss Universe Organization operated both pageants, as well as Miss Teen USA, until 2020. In 2020, the organization announced it was licensing operation of the Miss USA and Miss Teen USA pageants to Crystle Stewart, who was the Miss USA winner in 2008. In October 2022, Stewart was suspended, and the rights to the pageants were returned to the Miss Universe Organization. The pageants are now operated by Thom Brodeur.

The pageant was owned by Donald Trump from 1996 to 2015 and was previously broadcast on NBC. In September 2015, WME/IMG purchased the pageant from Trump. In 2020, for the first time, the FYI network broadcast the competition. In October 2022, JKN Global Group acquired the pageant along with the Miss Universe Organization itself from WME/IMG.

The current Miss USA is Justus Kelley of Virginia, who won the title on August 27, 2026, at the Adrienne Arsht Center for the Performing Arts in Miami, Florida.

== History ==
The Miss USA pageant was conceived in 1950 when Yolande Betbeze, winner of Miss America, refused to pose for publicity pictures while wearing a swimsuit. Pageant sponsor Catalina decided to remove their sponsorship of the pageant and create their own competition. Other owners have included a subsidiary of Gulf+Western Industries, Procter & Gamble under division of Madison Square Television Productions and Donald Trump.

The first Miss USA and Miss Universe pageants were held concurrently in Long Beach, California, in 1952; the first Miss USA winner was Miss New York USA Jackie Loughery. There were 30 contestants in the first year of competition. Many states did not compete every year during the first two decades of the pageant's history. Since the 1970s, each state and the District of Columbia have sent a contestant each year. Alaska first competed in 1959 and Hawaii in 1960. Both had competed at Miss Universe until this time.

The pageant aired on CBS from 1963 until 2002 and for many years was known for having a CBS game show host as pageant host. The show's highest ratings were in the early 1980s when it regularly topped the Nielsen ratings. Viewership dropped sharply from the 1990s to the 2000s, from an estimated viewership of 20 million to an average of 7 million from 2000 to 2001. In 2002, then-owner Trump brokered a deal with NBC, giving it half-ownership of the Miss USA, Miss Universe, and Miss Teen USA pageants and moving them to the network on an initial five-year contract. The pageant first aired on NBC in 2003.

The Miss USA title winner historically represented the U.S. in its sister pageant, Miss Universe. Since its inception, nine Miss USA titleholders have gone on to win Miss Universe. In the mid-1960s, the organization established a rule that when a Miss USA wins the Miss Universe title, the first runner-up assumes the Miss USA title for the remainder of the year. This occurred in 1980, 1995, 1997, 2012, and 2022. In 1967, the first runner-up Susan Bradley of California declined the title and the crown went to the second runner-up Cheryl Patton of Florida. The only instance when a first runner-up assumed the title of Miss USA before this period was in 1957, when Mary Leona Gage of Maryland resigned after it was discovered she was married.

The winner was formerly assigned a one-year contract with the Miss Universe Organization, traveling across the United States and sometimes overseas to spread messages about their chosen causes. Aside from the job, the winner also receives a cash salary for her entire reign, a modeling portfolio, beauty products, clothes, shoes, styling, healthcare, and fitness services from different pageant sponsors. She also gains exclusive access to events such as fashion shows and opening galas, as well as access to casting calls and modeling opportunities throughout New York City. When Trump owned the pageant, the winner was given the use of a Trump Place apartment in New York City during her reign, which she shared with the Miss Universe and Miss Teen USA titleholders.

If the winner cannot fulfill her duties as Miss USA for any reason, including if she wins the Miss Universe title, her first runner-up takes over.

=== 2015: Acquisition by IMG and Trump controversy ===
After losing its television partners, it was announced that Miss USA 2015 would be streamed on the pageant's website. Shortly before the pageant, however, Reelz Channel announced that it would broadcast Miss USA 2015.

In September 2015, IMG acquired the Miss Universe Organization for an undisclosed amount. The company had previously been involved in licensing and production for the events. The following month, Fox announced that it had acquired the U.S. television rights to Miss USA and Miss Universe, beginning with Miss Universe 2015 and Miss USA 2016.

In late-June 2015, both NBC and Spanish-language network Univision (which was to begin a new five-year contract for Spanish rights replacing Telemundo) announced that they would cut their ties with Trump and the Miss Universe Organization in response to remarks Trump made relating to undocumented immigrants during the launch of his 2016 U.S. presidential campaign. Trump threatened to sue both companies over the decision; on June 30, 2015, Trump sued Univision for defamation and breach of contract. In February 2016, Trump and Univision reached a settlement ending the litigation. The terms of the settlement remain confidential but included an agreement for Trump to buy back NBCUniversal's stake in the MUO.

=== 2020: Response to COVID-19 pandemic ===
The Miss USA 2020 was impacted by scheduling delays, difficulty finding a location, and broadcasting issues amid the ongoing COVID-19 pandemic in the United States. In August 2020 it was announced that it would be televised at FYI and would be held in November.

=== 2021–2023: Split from MUO, 2022 controversy ===
In the summer of 2020, the Miss Universe organization finalized licensing of future annual operation of the Miss USA and Miss Teen USA pageants to Crystle Stewart, who was Miss USA 2008 The first pageant competitions under her directorship as Miss USA Organization were the 2021 productions.

Shortly after the Miss USA 2022 competition, the Miss Universe Organization suspended the organizers of the Miss USA pageant (headed by Crystle Stewart) after allegations of favoritism toward the eventual winner, R'Bonney Gabriel, while she was still Miss Texas USA.

The Miss Universe Organization announced in August 2022 that, starting with the 2023 edition, it would accept divorced, maritally annulled, married, or widowed women and mothers to compete in the pageant. In October, JKN Global Group through JKN Metaverse Inc. acquired the Miss Universe Organization for US$14 million. In 2023, Miss Universe R'Bonney Gabriel (who had previously been crowned Miss USA 2022 before winning Miss Universe) announced that the organization would be forgoing the age limit, for all its related pageants, not just Miss USA.

In August 2023, it was announced that Stewart had stepped down as president of the Miss USA Organization. She was replaced by fashion designer Laylah Rose. Noelia Voigt was later crowned Miss USA 2023 as the first titleholder of Rose's tenure.

=== 2024–present: Resignation of both National Titleholders & acquisition by Thom Brodeur ===
On May 6, 2024, the reigning Miss USA, Noelia Voigt, announced on social media that she had resigned from the title, citing a desire to prioritize her mental health; two days later, the reigning Miss Teen USA, UmaSofia Srivastava, also resigned from her title. Voigt's resignation statement, which she posted to Instagram, seemingly spelled out (with the first letter of the beginning of each sentence): "I Am Silenced". The New York Times later obtained Voigt's internal resignation letter to the Miss USA organization where she cited "a toxic work environment", "bullying and harassment", and delayed delivery of her prize winnings as reasons for her resignation. Voigt's first runner-up, Savannah Gankiewicz of Hawaii, assumed the title of Miss USA 2023 on May 9, 2024.[1]

Both Voigt and Srivastava held contracts with the Miss USA organization which have confidentiality agreements and NDAs. Later, their respective mothers, Jackeline Voigt and Barbara Srivastava, gave an interview to Good Morning America, where they alleged that that their daughters were exposed to ill-treatment, abuse, and bullying by the organization's president Laylah Rose. When Voight's mother was asked about the implied cryptic message in her daughter's resignation post, she declined to confirm its deliberate intent but emphasized that Voigt felt silenced due to the ongoing provisions of the non-disclosure agreement.

In September 2025, longtime pageant coach Thom Brodeur announced on Instagram that he had acquired the Miss USA and Miss Teen USA pageants as the new president, chairman, and CEO. The next day, Rose stated on the official Miss USA accounts that she was still the owner, saying that she had not been made aware of "any new contracts regarding any transfer of ownership." However, MUO later issued a press release stating that Brodeur had in fact acquired the exclusive licenses to the pageants, and on October 10, 2025, Brodeur and his organization successfully regained access to the official social media accounts .

== Competition ==
The modern pageant consists of a preliminary competition held a week before the pageant when all contestants are judged in swimsuit, evening gown, and interview competitions.

== State competitions ==
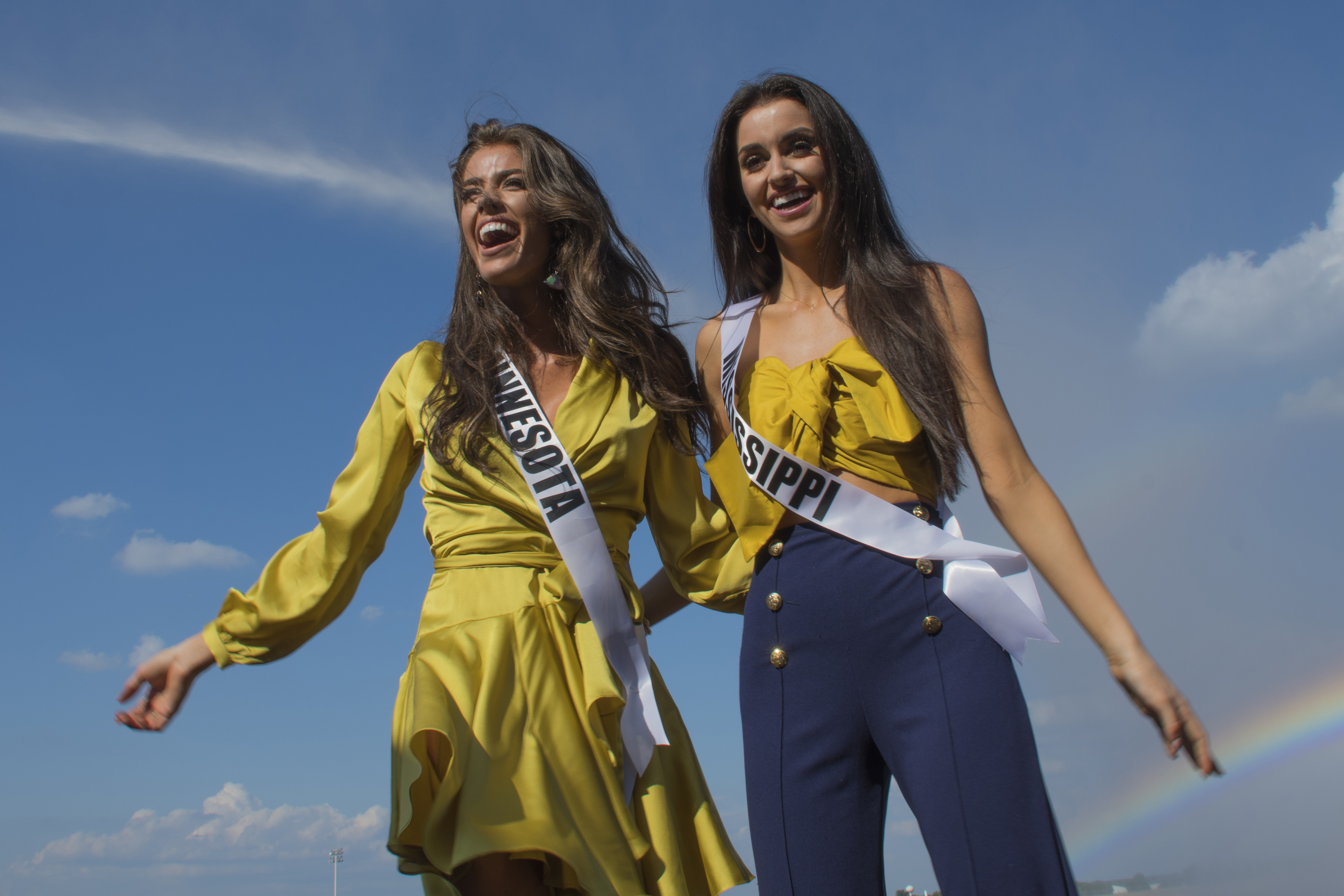
Kalie Wright, Miss Minnesota USA 2018, and Laine Mansour, Miss Mississippi USA 2018, at Barksdale Air Force Base

Every year, applicants must have to choose their delegate for the Miss USA pageant who is at the age of 18 or above on the annual state pageant season. Each state holds a preliminary competition. In some states, local pageants are also held to determine delegates for the state competition. The state winners hold the title "Miss (State) USA" for the year of their reign.

The most successful state is Texas; ten Texas representatives have gone on to win the Miss USA title, more than any other state, including five consecutive winners from 1985 until 1989. California has the second most wins at six, while the District of Columbia, New York, Hawaii, Illinois, and Michigan each have four.

Miss USA licenses out the state pageants to pageant directors, who in some cases are responsible for more than one state. As of February 2024, the directorial groups are the following:

- Brains and Beauties Productions (District of Columbia)
- Casting Crowns Productions (Arizona)
- Crown Diva Productions (California)
- D&D Productions (Maryland, New Jersey, New York, Rhode Island)
- Empower2 Productions (Indiana, West Virginia)
- Ewald Productions (Connecticut)
- Eye for Style Production (New Hampshire, Vermont)
- Future Productions (Colorado, Iowa, Minnesota, North Dakota, South Dakota, Wisconsin, Wyoming)
- Greenwood Productions (Georgia, Mississippi, Tennessee)
- Hayat Amyra Productions (Florida)
- Laura's Productions (New Mexico)
- Lime Light Enterprises (Montana)
- New Media Productions (Hawaii)
- Pageants NW Productions (Idaho, Oregon, Washington)
- Proctor Productions (Kentucky, Michigan, Ohio, Pennsylvania)
- RPM Productions (Alabama, Louisiana, North Carolina, South Carolina)
- Smoak Productions (Nevada, Utah)
- Simply Stunning Productions (Alaska)
- The Clemente Organization (Maine, Massachusetts)
- The FAV Group, Inc. (Virginia)
- The Pageant Guy Productions (Texas)
- V&M Productions (Delaware)
- Vanbros and Associates (Arkansas, Illinois, Kansas, Missouri, Nebraska, Oklahoma)

== Winners ==
At the age of 27 years, 2 months and 27 days, Miss USA 2026, Justus Kelley became the oldest winner in the pageant's history. She also became the first married woman and mother to win.

The tallest winner is Miss USA 2012, Nana Meriwether, of Maryland at 6 ft 0 in (1.83 m).

The first Asian-American woman to win was Macel Wilson of Hawaii in 1962; the first Hispanic woman was Laura Martinez-Herring of Texas in 1985; the first African-American winner was Carole Gist of Michigan in 1990; the first Pacific Islander American was Brook Lee of Hawaii in 1997; and the first Middle Eastern American was Rima Fakih of Michigan in 2010.

Miss USA 2015, Olivia Jordan, of Oklahoma is the only winner to compete in two major international pageants: Miss Universe and Miss World.

Though no woman has ever won both titles outright, Brandi Sherwood of Idaho is the only woman to have held both the Miss Teen USA and Miss USA titles. She was Miss Idaho Teen USA, Miss Teen USA 1989, Miss Idaho USA 1997, first runner-up at Miss USA 1997, and in May 1997 assumed the Miss USA title after Brook Lee of Hawaii won the Miss Universe pageant. Eleven other Miss USA titleholders have also previously competed at Miss Teen USA. These include:

- Shanna Moakler (1995, Miss Rhode Island Teen USA 1992)
- Ali Landry (1996, Miss Louisiana Teen USA 1990)
- Kimberly Pressler (1999, Miss New York Teen USA 1994)
- Lynnette Cole (2000, Miss Tennessee Teen USA 1995)
- Susie Castillo (2003, Miss Massachusetts Teen USA 1998)
- Chelsea Cooley (2005, Miss North Carolina Teen USA 2000)
- Tara Conner (2006, Miss Kentucky Teen USA 2002)
- Rachel Smith (2007, Miss Tennessee Teen USA 2002)
- Alyssa Campanella (2011, Miss New Jersey Teen USA 2007)
- Sarah Rose Summers (2018, Miss Nebraska Teen USA 2012)
- Audrey Eckert (2025, Miss Nebraska Teen USA 2020)

Six Miss USA titleholders have also competed at Miss America. These include:

- Miriam Stevenson (1954, Miss South Carolina 1953)
- Carlene King Johnson (1955, Miss Vermont 1953)
- Carol Morris (1956, Miss Iowa 1954)
- Mai Shanley (1984, Miss New Mexico 1983)
- Shandi Finnessey (2004, Miss Missouri 2002)
- Asya Branch (2020, Miss Mississippi 2018)

Shandi Finnessey, Miss USA 2004 and Miss Missouri 2002 won a preliminary evening gown award at Miss America 2003. Also, Miriam Stevenson placed in the top 10 at Miss America 1954 as Miss South Carolina 1953.

Many Miss USA winners have gone to pursue careers in the entertainment industry. Those who have been successful in the industry include Summer Bartholomew, Deborah Shelton, Laura Martinez-Herring, Kelli McCarty, Shanna Moakler, Frances Parker, Ali Landry, Kenya Moore, Brandi Sherwood, Kimberly Pressler, Susie Castillo, Shandi Finnessey, Rachel Smith, Crystle Stewart, Olivia Culpo and Cheslie Kryst.

== Miss USA titleholders ==
Year	State	Miss USA	Venue	Placement at Miss Universe	Special awards
2026	Virginia	Justus Kelley	Miami, Florida		
2025	Nebraska	Audrey Eckert	Reno, Nevada	Top 30	
2024	Michigan	Alma Cooper	Los Angeles, California	Unplaced	
2023	Hawaii	Savannah Gankiewicz	Honolulu, Hawaii	Originally 1st runner-up, later assumed title after Voigt resigned	
2023	Utah	Noelia Voigt (resigned)	Reno, Nevada	Top 20	
2022	North Carolina	Morgan Romano	Auburn, Alabama	Originally 1st runner-up, later assumed title after Gabriel won Miss Universe	
2022	Texas	R'Bonney Gabriel	Reno, Nevada	Miss Universe 2022	

== Awards ==
The awards most frequently presented at Miss USA are Miss Amity (also known as Miss Congeniality) and Miss Photogenic.

The Miss Amity Award is chosen by the delegates, and recognizes those who are the friendliest and make the pageant experience the most enjoyable. From 1952 to 1964, when the Miss USA and Miss Universe pageants were concurrent events, the award could be won by a contestant competing either for Miss USA or Miss Universe. In fact, in 1960, there was a tie, with the award going to Miss Universe Burma, Myint Myint May, and Miss Louisiana USA, Rebecca Fletcher. In 2015, Alaska and Delaware tied for the Miss Congeniality award. Vermont and Wyoming have won five Miss Amity/Congeniality awards, two more than any other state.

The Miss Photogenic prize was first awarded in 1965 and was chosen by journalists until 1996 when it was chosen by an internet vote for the first time. There has been only one tie in this award's history: in 1980, when it was shared between Jineane Ford of Arizona and Elizabeth Kim Thomas of Ohio. The state that has won the most Photogenic awards is Virginia.

Louisiana won both the first Miss Amity and Photogenic awards given to a Miss USA contestant.

Other awards that have been presented include Best State Costume (1962–1993, 2021–present), Style (1995–2001) and Most Beautiful Eyes (1993). In 1998, a special Distinguished Achievement award was given to Halle Berry. Berry was Miss Ohio USA 1986 and placed 1st runner-up to Christy Fichtner of Texas. She later went on to become an acclaimed actress and Oscar winner.

== Locations ==
In the first eight years of competition (1952–1959), the Miss USA pageant was held in Long Beach, California. The competition moved to Miami Beach, Florida in 1960 and stayed there until 1971. In 1972, the pageant was held in Puerto Rico, the only time the pageant has been held outside the continental United States. That pageant was rocked by an explosion at the host hotel.

From 1972 onwards, the pageant has been held in various locations, generally being held in each location for two to three years.

As of 2026, the pageant has been held in the following states:

- Alabama
  - Mobile (1989)
- California
  - Long Beach (1952–1959)
  - Los Angeles (2004, 2007, 2024)
- Florida
  - Miami Beach (1960–1971)
  - Lakeland (1984–1985)
  - Miami (1986, 2026)
- Indiana
  - Gary (2001–2002)
- Kansas
  - Wichita (1990–1993)
- Louisiana
  - Shreveport (1997–1998, 2018)
  - Baton Rouge (2014–2015)
- Maryland
  - Baltimore (2005–2006)
- Missouri
  - Branson (1999–2000)
- Mississippi
  - Biloxi (1979–1982)
- Nevada
  - Las Vegas (2008–2013, 2016–2017)
  - Reno (2019, 2022–2023; 2025)
- New Mexico
  - Albuquerque (1987)
- New York
  - New York City (1973)
  - Niagara Falls (1974–1976)
- Oklahoma
  - Tulsa (2021)
- South Carolina
  - Charleston (1977–1978)
- Tennessee
  - Knoxville (1983)
  - Memphis (2020)
- Texas
  - El Paso (1988)
  - South Padre Island (1994–1996)
  - San Antonio (2003)

== Reality television ==
Many Miss USA and Miss Teen USA delegates have participated in reality television shows and other television game shows. Well known delegates who later competed in reality shows are Danni Boatwright, winner of Survivor: Guatemala and contestant of Survivor: Winners at War, Kim Mullen of Survivor: Palau; Amanda Kimmel of Survivor: China, Survivor: Micronesia and Survivor: Heroes vs. Villains; Candace Smith of Survivor: Tocantins; Ashley Underwood of Survivor: Redemption Island, and Desiree Williams of Survivor: Heroes vs. Healers vs. Hustlers; Christie Lee Woods of The Amazing Race 5 and The Amazing Race 31, Nicole O'Brian also of The Amazing Race 5, Stephanie Smith of The Amazing Race 17 and Amy Diaz of The Amazing Race 23; Shandi Finnessey, Shanna Moakler and Hannah Brown on Dancing with the Stars; Jennifer Murphy of The Apprentice 4; Tori Fiorenza of The Challenge: Cutthroat; Brown also appeared in The Bachelor and The Bachelorette, other The Bachelor stars include Krisily Kennedy, Catherine Warren, Caroline Lunny, Caelynn Miller-Keyes, Alayah Benavidez, Kelsey Weier, Victoria Paul, Mariela Pepin, and Susie Evans.

In 2007, Pageant Place, a reality television show featuring Rachel Smith, Riyo Mori, Hilary Cruz, Katie Blair, and Tara Conner aired on MTV.

On June 19, 2011, Bravo Television's Andy Cohen co-hosted the event's 60th anniversary live in Las Vegas with E! News and Fashion Police's Giuliana Rancic. They also hosted the 2012 pageant.

== Presenters ==
=== Main Host ===
==== Recent ====
- Ian Ziering: 2026
- Kenya Moore: 2026

==== Past ====
- Emmanuel Acho: 2025
- Olivia Jordan: 2025
- Garcelle Beauvais: 2024
- Keltie Knight: 2023–2024
- Adrienne Bailon-Houghton: 2023
- Zuri Hall: 2021-2022
- Patrick Ta: 2021
- Akbar Gbaja-Biamila: 2020
- Allie LaForce: 2020
- Nick Lachey: 2018–2019
- Vanessa Lachey: 2018–2019
- Terrence J: 2016–2017
- Julianne Hough: 2016–2017
- Todd Newton: 2015
- Alex Wehrley: 2015
- Thomas Roberts: 2014
- Nick Jonas: 2013
- Giuliana Rancic: 2011–2014
- Andy Cohen: 2011–2012
- Curtis Stone: 2010
- Natalie Morales: 2010
- Nadine Velazquez: 2009
- Donny Osmond: 2008
- Marie Osmond: 2008
- Tim Vincent: 2007
- Drew Lachey: 2006
- Nancy O'Dell: 2004–2007
- Billy Bush: 2003–2005, 2009
- Daisy Fuentes: 2003
- Deion Sanders: 2002
- Ali Landry: 2002
- William Shatner: 2001
- Carson Daly: 2000
- Shemar Moore: 1999
- J. Eddie Peck: 1998
- George Hamilton: 1997
- Bob Goen: 1994–1996
- Dick Clark: 1989–1993
- Alan Thicke: 1988
- Bob Barker: 1967–1987

== See also ==
- Crown of Deceit: Inside the Miss Universe Scandal
- Miss Grand USA
- Miss U.S. International
- Miss World America
- Miss Earth USA
- Miss Teen USA
- Miss America
- Miss and Mister Supranational USA
