= Joselina García =

Honduran beauty pageant contestant (born 1978)

Joselina García Arrambides
- Born: María Joselina García Cobos; October 31, 1978 (age 47); Tegucigalpa, Honduras
- Spouse: Federico Gerardo Arrambides Gómez
- Children: 2
- Beauty pageant titleholder
- Title: Miss Honduras 1997
- Hair color: Black
- Eye color: Brown
- Major competitions: Miss Honduras 1997 (winner); Miss Universe 1997

María Joselina García Cobos (born October 31, 1978, in Tegucigalpa, Honduras) is a Honduran beauty pageant titleholder. Business administrator at University of San Pedro Sula and MBA at Universidad Catolica, Honduras. Joselina García, as she is usually referred to, won Miss Honduras in 1997 contest and competed in Miss Universe the same year. There she placed second in the Best National Costume Award, just after Colombia Claudia Vásquez Ángel. Her costume was designed by the Colombian designer Alfredo Rueda.

She spent her first years in Florida, U.S., but then moved back to Honduras. .
