= Miss Idaho =

Beauty pageant competition

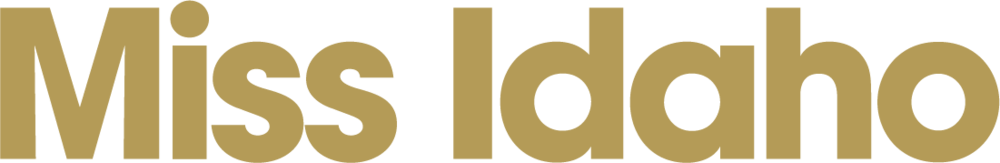
- Formation: 1933
- Type: Scholarship Organization
- Headquarters: Boise
- Location: Idaho
- Members: Miss America
- Official language: English
- Key people: Heidi Kennedy (Executive Director)
- Website: Official website

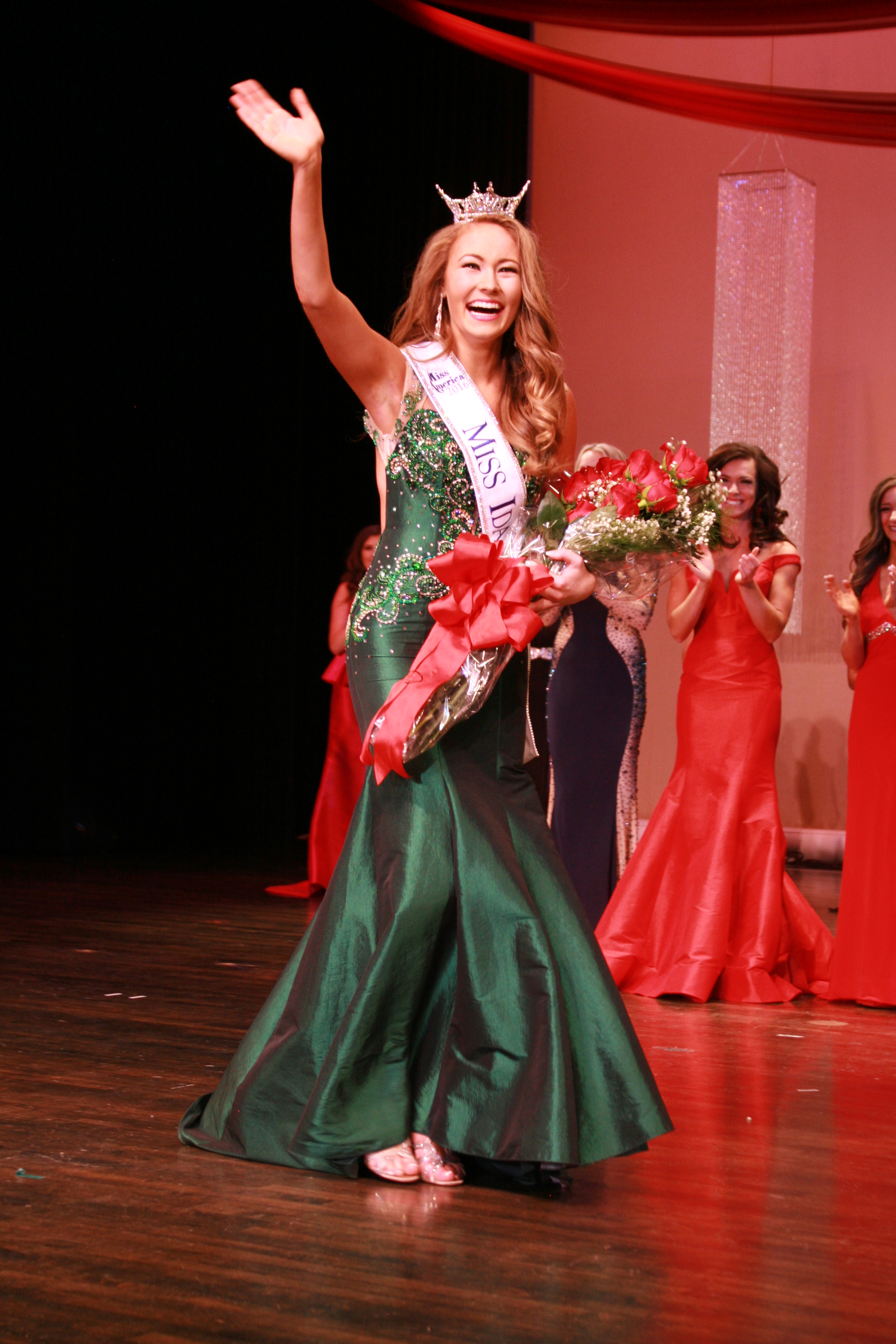
Kylee Solberg, Miss Idaho 2016

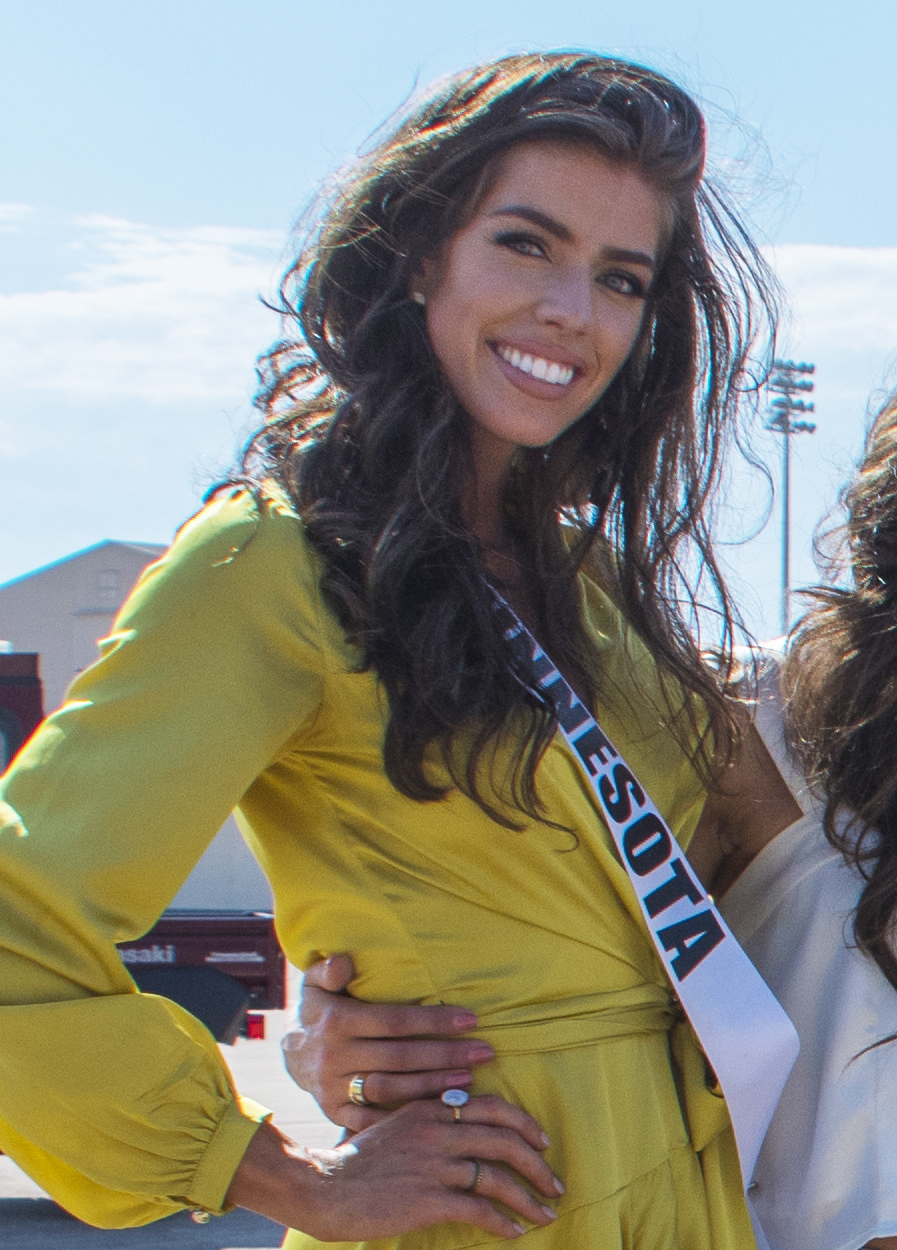
Kalie Wright, Miss Idaho 2015 and Miss Minnesota USA 2018

The Miss Idaho scholarship program is the pageant that selects the representative for the state of Idaho in the Miss America pageant. The current titleholder receives a $4,000 cash scholarship to any accredited institution of her choice. She also represents the state of Idaho for the live ABC broadcast of the Miss America pageant.

Déja Fitzwater of Portland was crowned Miss Idaho on June 13, 2026, at the Colonial Theater in Idaho Falls. She competed for the title of Miss America 2027 on September 6, 2026, at the Kravis Center for the Performing Arts in West Palm Beach, Florida.

== Results summary ==
The following is a visual summary of the past results of Miss Idaho titleholders at the national Miss America pageants/competitions. The year in parentheses indicates the year of the national competition during which a placement and/or award was garnered, not the year attached to the contestant's state title.

=== Placements ===
- 1st runners-up: Karen Herd (1972)
- Top 10: Marlene Coleman (1961), Nina Forest (2019)
- Top 15: E. Louise Fletchner (1939), Kylee Solberg (2017)
- Top 16: Sierra Sandison (2015)

=== Awards ===
==== Preliminary awards ====
- Preliminary Lifestyle and Fitness: Kristine Phillips (1968)

==== Non-finalist awards ====
- Non-finalist Talent: Carene Clark (1958), Bonnie Leila Baird (1959), Judith Steubbe (1965), Rhonda Hammond (1966), Karen Ryder (1969), RaNae Peterson (1977), Kimberly Jensen (1979), Stephanie Kambitsch (1982), Elaine Pack (1984), Kendra Ruwe (1991), Sadie Quigley (2008), Whitney Wood (2013), Kalie Wright (2016)
- Non-finalist Interview: Rebecca Trueblood (1990), Elizabeth Barchas (2005)

==== Other awards ====
- America's Choice: Sierra Sandison (2015)
- Miss Congeniality: Grace Zimmerman (2020)
- Four Points Award: Genevieve Nutting (2012), Whitney Wood (2013), Sarah Downs (2014)
- Louanne Gamba Instrumental Award: Whitney Wood (2013)
- Quality of Life Award Winners: Tracey Brown (2006)
- Quality of Life Award 1st runners-up: Brooke Gambrell (1996), Elizabeth Barchas (2005)
- Quality of Life Award Finalists: Whitney Wood (2013)
- Women in Business Scholarship Award Finalists: Grace Zimmerman (2020)

== Winners ==
- Declared as winner
- Ended as a runner-up
- Ended as a finalist or semi-finalist

Year	Name	Hometown	Age	Local Title	Miss America Talent	Placement at Miss America	Special scholarships at Miss America	Notes
2026	Déja Fitzwater	Portland, OR	21	Miss White Pine	Jazz Vocal			Student at the University of Idaho; National American Miss Teen 2024-25; Miss Idaho Teen USA 1st RU 2024; Queen Of Rosaria 2023; Previously Miss Oregon's Outstanding Teen 2022
2025	Ellie Daniels	Bonneville	18	Miss Bonneville County	Dance			
2024	Madison Andreason	Pocatello	21	Miss Pocatello	Vocal, "What Was I Made For"			Previously Miss Idaho's Outstanding Teen 2021; Daughter of Miss Idaho USA 1987, Vicki Hoffman Andreason
2023	Reagan Yamauchi	Soda Springs			Piano and Basketball			
2022	Sarah Jensen	Weiser	26	Miss Western Idaho	Piano			
2021	Ayriss Torres	Pocatello	21	Miss Bonneville County	Ballet en Pointe			
2019–20 (Note: Appointed titleholder extended to a second full year in 2020 after state and national pageants postponed to 2021 due to the COVID-19 pandemic)	Grace Zimmerman	Weiser	21	Miss Western Idaho	Dance		Miss Congeniality Women in Business Scholarship Finalist	Originally first runner-up; assumed the title when Forest resigned in June 2019
2019–20	Rachel Forest	Pocatello	18	Miss Pocatello		Unable to compete; resigned to continue to pursue her education at Columbia University		
2019–20	Rachel Forest	Pocatello	18	Miss Pocatello				Younger sister of Miss Idaho 2018, Nina Forest Previously Distinguished Young Woman of Idaho 2017
2018	Nina Forest	Pocatello	21	Miss Pocatello	Piano, "Rhapsody Brillante" by Melody Bober	Top 10		Older sister of Miss Idaho 2019, Rachel Forest
2017	Taylor Lance	Boise	23	Miss Meridian	Vocal, "So Small" by Carrie Underwood			
2016	Kylee Solberg	Coeur d'Alene	21	Miss Tri-Counties	Classical Ballet en Pointe	Top 15		Previously National Sweetheart 2015
2015	Kalie Wright	Kimberly	23	Miss Magic Valley	Vocal/Guitar, "Over the Rainbow"		Non-finalist Talent Award	Previously National Sweetheart 2014 Later Miss Minnesota USA 2018
2014	Sierra Sandison	Twin Falls	20	Miss Magic Valley	Vocal, "Forget About the Boy" from Thoroughly Modern Millie	Top 16	America's Choice	
2013	Sarah Downs	Emmett	23	Miss Nampa	Violin, "Orange Blossom Special"		Four Points Award	
2012	Whitney Wood	Idaho Falls	19	Miss Idaho Falls	Piano, "Etude de Concert Opus 26" by Edward MacDowell		Four Points Award Louanne Gamba Instrumentalist Award Non-finalist Talent Award Quality of Life Award Finalist	
2011	Genevieve Nutting	Boise	22	Miss Tri-Counties	Piano, Rhapsody in Blue		Four Points Award	Previously Miss Idaho's Outstanding Teen 2006 Contestant at National Sweetheart 2010 pageant
2010	Kylie Kofoed	Eagle	19	Miss Nampa	Classical Vocal, "Time to Say Goodbye"			Only contestant at Miss America 2011 pageant to wear a one-piece swimsuit
2009	Kara Jackson	Nampa	22	Miss Nampa	Viola, "Csárdás"			
2008	Elise Davis	Idaho Falls	20	Miss Idaho Falls	Classical Vocal			
2007	Sadie Quigley	Idaho Falls	19	Miss Eastern Idaho	Piano, "Devilish Inspiration, Op. 4, No. 4" by Prokofiev		Non-finalist Talent Award	
2006	Katherine Crouch	Rexburg	19	Miss Rexburg	Piano, "Un Sospiro"			
2005	Tracey Brown	Post Falls	19	Miss North Idaho	Ballet en Pointe, "The Stars and Stripes Forever"		Quality of Life Award	Later Miss Idaho USA 2008
2004	Elizabeth Barchas	Boise	24	Miss Nampa	Classical Piano, "Prelude in C sharp minor"		Non-finalist Interview Award Quality of Life Award 1st runner-up	Triple Crown Winner: Previously Miss Idaho Teen USA 1998; Previously Miss Idaho USA 2001; Later Solicitor General of the United States (2021–2025)
2003	Tiffany Jewell	Boise	22	Miss Southern Idaho	Vocal, "Ten Minutes Ago" from Cinderella			
2002	Misty Taylor	Boise	20	Miss Tri-Counties	Classical Vocal, "Chacun le Sait" from La fille du régiment			
2001	Christi Weible	Eagle	22	Miss Tri-Counties	Dramatic Monologue			Sister of Miss Idaho Teen USA 1999 and Miss Idaho USA 2004, Kimberly Weible Contestant at National Sweetheart 1998 & 2000 pageants Contestant on season 2 of The Bachelor
2000	Christina Tiel	Nampa	21	Miss Blaine County	Classical Vocal, "Una Voce Poco Fa" from The Barber of Seville			
1999	Mellisa Paul	Boise	20	Miss Tri-Counties	Dramatic Monologue from Steel Magnolias			
1998	Tammy Toney	Boise	24	Miss Southern Idaho	Classical Vocal, "Che Fiero Costume"' from Eteocle e Polinice by Giovanni Legrenzi			
1997	Sherrie Belnap	Roberts	20	Miss Southern Idaho	Classical Piano, "Polonaise in A flat"			
1996	Misty Esplin	Preston	19	Miss Franklin County	Classical Clarinet, "Concertino" by Carl Maria von Weber			
1995	Brooke Gambrell	Boise	22	Miss Boise	Violin/Fiddle Medley, "Blackberry Blossom"		Quality of Life Award 1st runner-up	Later Miss Idaho USA 2000
1994	Tracy Yarbrough	Boise	24	Miss Southern Idaho	Vocal, "Over the Rainbow"			Later Miss Idaho USA 1996
1993	RoseAnna Boyle	Twin Falls	23	Miss Twin Falls	Vocal, "Come Rain or Come Shine"			
1992	Stephanie Smith	Boise	26	Miss Eastern Idaho	Harp, "The Impossible Dream" & "Man of La Mancha"			
1991	Sarah Louise Benson	Nampa	18	Miss Treasure Valley	Classical Piano			
1990	Kendra Ruwe	Meridian	23	Miss Boise	Fiddle, "Miss Sally Goodin"		Non-finalist Talent Award	
1989	Rebecca Trueblood	Caldwell	26	Miss Treasure Valley	Vocal, "God Bless the USA"		Non-finalist Interview Award	
1988	Susan Hart	Rigby	18	Miss Idaho Falls	Ballet			
1987	Holly Hill	Meridian	20	Miss Meridian	Vocal, "The Music and the Mirror" from A Chorus Line			
1986	Jennifer Hovey	Twin Falls	19	Miss Idaho National Guard	Violin			
1985	Nanette South	Rexburg	19	Miss Rexburg	Alto Saxophone			
1984	Patty Hoag	Burley	19	Miss Burley	Popular Vocal, "Wind Beneath My Wings"			
1983	Elaine Pack	Rexburg	20	Miss Idaho National Guard	Harp, "Spanish Fantasy"		Non-finalist Talent Award	
1982	Lisa Eaton	Shelley	22	Miss Eastern Idaho	Vocal "It's My Turn"			
1981	Stephanie Kambitsch	Genesee	22	Miss University of Idaho	Piano, "Hungarian Rhapsody No. 11"		Non-finalist Talent Award	
1980	Leslie Taylor	Burley	18	Miss Burley	Piano, "Rocktata"			
1979	Gladys Steele	Boise	22	Miss Boise	Violin, "Polish Dance"			
1978	Kimberly Jensen	Caldwell	18	Miss Caldwell	Popular Vocal, "I Honestly Love You"		Non-finalist Talent Award	
1977	Charlene McArthur	Pocatello	21	Miss Pocatello	Piano, "Piano Throughout the Ages"			Previously Miss Idaho USA 1975
1976	RaNae Peterson	Preston	19	Miss Preston	Organ Medley, "I Got Rhythm" & "I'd Like to Teach the World to Sing"		Non-finalist Talent Award	
1975	Teri Harding	Heyburn	19	Miss Heyburn	Vocal, "If Ever I Would Leave You"			
1974	Rochelle Bacon	Boise	21	Miss Boise	Vocal, "Cornet Man" from Funny Girl			
1973	Sharon Davis	Jerome	21	Miss Twin Falls	Vocal, "Matchmaker, Matchmaker" from Fiddler on the Roof			
1972	Vicki Hawkins	Boise	20	Miss Boise	Piano, "Theme from Summer of '42"			
1971	Karen Herd	Idaho Falls	20	Miss Idaho Falls	Organ, "Ebb Tide" & "España cañí"	1st runner-up		
1970	Noralyn Olsen	Ovid	18	Miss Montpelier	Classical Piano, "Etude Op. 10, No. 5"			
1969	Diana Hopperstad	Twin Falls	19	Miss Twin Falls	Folk Song with Tambourine & Drum, "Both Sides, Now"			
1968	Karen Ryder	Weiser	20	Miss Weiser	Magic Act, "The Shadow of Your Smile" & "Born Free"		Non-finalist Talent Award	
1967	Kristine Phillips	Rupert	19	Miss Rupert	Organ Medley, "Tico Tico", "Dark Eyes", & "The Shadow of Your Smile"		Preliminary Swimsuit Award	
1966	Cheryl Couch	Twin Falls	19	Miss Twin Falls	Vocal, "I Could Have Danced All Night" from My Fair Lady			
1965	Rhonda Hammond	Preston	19	Miss Idaho State University	Speech on Fashion Design with Modeling		Non-finalist Talent Award	
1964	Judith Steubbe	Moscow	21	Miss University of Idaho	Piano, Fantaisie-Impromptu		Non-finalist Talent Award	
1963	Linda Moulton	Boise	20	Miss Boise	Semi-classical Vocal & Piano			
1962	Irene May Ammons	Nampa	23	Miss Nampa	Folk Vocal, "The Riddle Song"			
1961	LaVerda Garrison	Nampa	18	Miss Nampa	Dramatic Reading, "The Yellow Wallpaper"			
1960	Marlene Coleman	Pocatello	18	Miss Pocatello	Vocal, "If I Were On the Stage"	Top 10		Contracted laryngitis and was unable to perform her talent during the national telecast
1959	Tamara Ashby	Burley	18		Original Interpretive Ballet			
1958	Bonnie Leila Baird	Heyburn			Clarinet		Non-finalist Talent Award	Bonnie Baird Smith died at age 73 on Sept. 9, 2013 at home in North Logan, Utah after a two-year battle with Alzheimer's disease
1957	Carene Clark	Pocatello			Classical Vocal from Die Fledermaus		Non-finalist Talent Award	
1956	Gail Rupp	Pocatello			Vocal, "One Kiss" from The New Moon			
1955	Judy Voiten	Boise	19		Vocal / Guitar, "Western Folk Song Medley"			
1954	LaVonne Skalsky	Nampa			Dramatic Monologue, "Children of God"			
1953	Verna Jane Bostic	New Plymouth	18		Vocal, "All the Things You Are"			
1952	Zoe Ann Warberg	Twin Falls	18	Miss Twin Falls	Speech, "The Sacred Duty of the American to Vote"			First female judge in Idaho's 5th Judicial District and appeared on the 1985 Miss America telecast. Zoe Ann Warberg Shaub died at 83 on Sept. 13, 2017 as result of a car accident in rural Jackpot, Nevada.
1951	Phyllis Charlene Ralstin	Nezperce	19		Operatic Vocal, "My Hero" from The Chocolate Soldier			
1950	Barbara Norton	Burley			Vocal, "A Heart That's Free" from Two Weeks with Love			
1949	No Idaho representative at Miss America pageant							
1948	No Idaho representative at Miss America pageant							
1947	Norma Briggs	Pocatello			Drama, Romeo & Juliet			
1946	No Idaho representative at Miss America pageant							
1945	No Idaho representative at Miss America pageant							
1944	No Idaho representative at Miss America pageant							
1943	No Idaho representative at Miss America pageant							
1942	No Idaho representative at Miss America pageant							
1941	No Idaho representative at Miss America pageant							
1940	No Idaho representative at Miss America pageant							
1939	E. Louise Fletchner			Miss Sun Valley	Clarinet, "Stardust"	Top 15		E. Louise Flechtner Brierton died at age 99 on May 5, 2020 in Pennsylvania.
1938	No Idaho representative at Miss America pageant							
1937	No Idaho representative at Miss America pageant							
1936	No Idaho representative at Miss America pageant							
1935	No Idaho representative at Miss America pageant							
1934	No national pageant was held							
1933	Margaret Whitman	Spokane, WA				N/A		Was disqualified from the pageant because she resided in Spokane, Washington
1932	No national pageants were held							
1931	No national pageants were held							
1930	No national pageants were held							
1929	No national pageants were held							
1928	No national pageants were held							
1927	No Idaho representative at Miss America pageant							
1926	No Idaho representative at Miss America pageant							
1925	No Idaho representative at Miss America pageant							
1924	No Idaho representative at Miss America pageant							
1923	No Idaho representative at Miss America pageant							
1922	No Idaho representative at Miss America pageant							
1921	No Idaho representative at Miss America pageant							
