= Charlie Berens =

American journalist and comedian (born 1987)

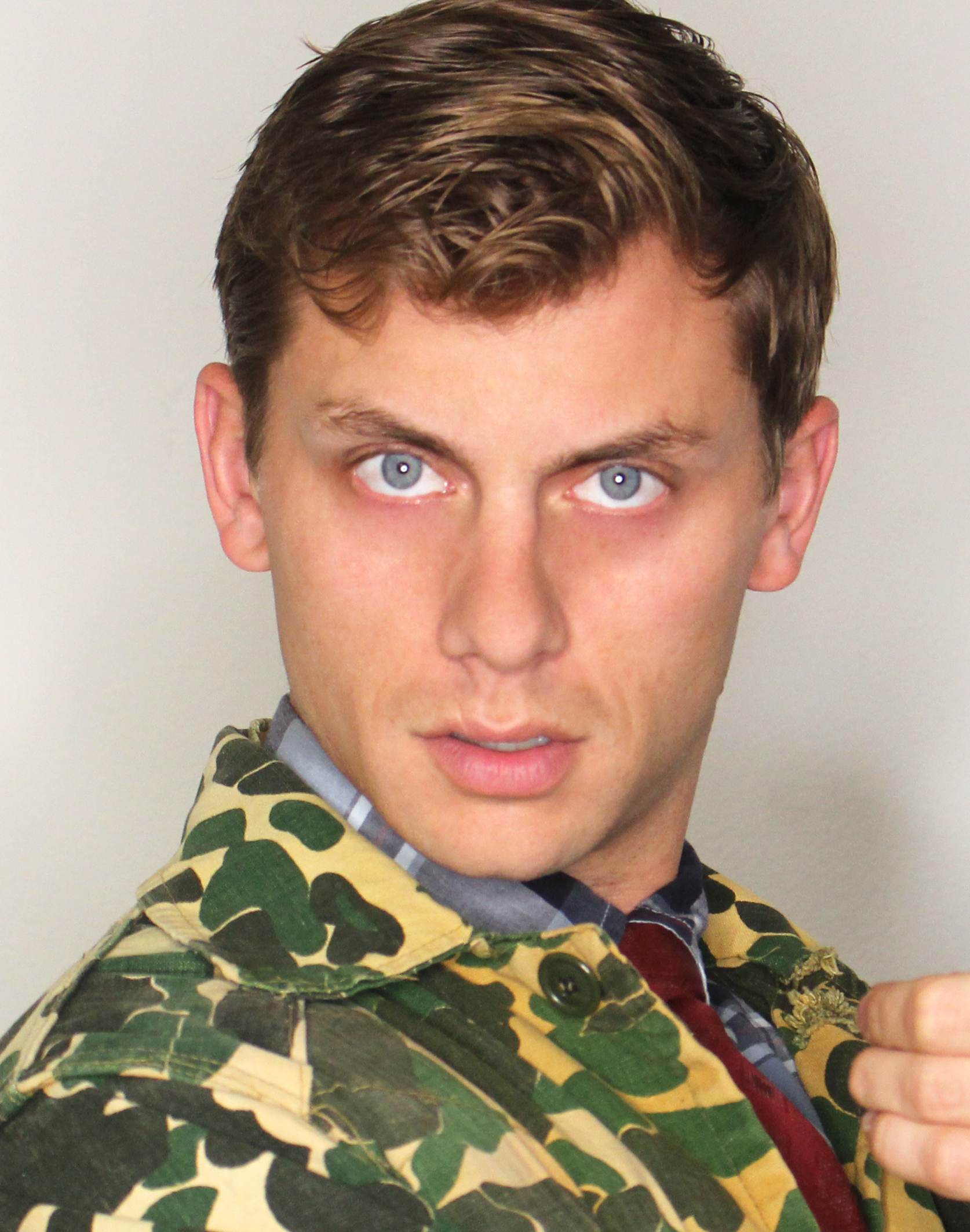
- Berens in 2017
- Born: April 27, 1987 (age 39); Oconomowoc, Wisconsin, U.S.
- Education: University of Wisconsin–Madison
- Occupations: Comedian; journalist
- Years active: 2007–present
- Spouse: Alex Wehrley (m. 2015; div. 2020)

YouTube information
- Channel: Charlie Berens
- Years active: 2013–present
- Genre: Comedy
- Subscribers: 2.93 million
- Views: 2.8 billion

Comedy career
- Medium: Stand-up; video
- Genre: Observational comedy
- Subjects: Midwestern United States; current events; sports
- Last updated: April 9, 2026
- Website: charlieberens.com

Charlie Berens (born April 27, 1987) is an American journalist, and comedian, widely known for creating the online video series Manitowoc Minute. He has been featured on FOX, CBS, Funny or Die, TBS Digital, Variety, and MTV News. His observational humor often focuses on the Midwestern United States.

== Early life ==
Berens was born in Oconomowoc, Wisconsin, into a Catholic family as one of twelve children. He grew up in the Wisconsin towns of Elm Grove and New Berlin. He graduated from Marquette University High School and studied broadcast journalism at the University of Wisconsin-Madison.

== Career ==
=== Television journalism ===
Berens began his career working for the MTV News show Choose or Lose. He covered Wisconsin state politics and was arrested while covering protests at the 2008 Republican National Convention. In 2012, Tribune Media recruited Berens to host the comedic news show Nightcap. While a reporter for KDAF-TV, Berens won his first Regional Emmy.

In 2014, CBS Sports Network hired Berens to host the sports gameshow You're So Money and PMC made Berens the host of their comedy/entertainment news brand @Hollywood.

Berens has been featured on Funny or Die. His comedic mashups, including "If Jack Dawson was Really from Wisconsin," have garnered more than thirteen million views. He authored the book The Midwest Survival Guide: How We Talk, Love, Work, Drink, and Eat...Everything with Ranch (2021).

=== Manitowoc Minute ===
In 2017, Berens created Manitowoc Minute, a weekly comedic video series. The name refers to the Wisconsin city of Manitowoc. His "Oh My Gosh!" Tour, inspired by the series, sold out theaters across Wisconsin. Berens partnered with Madison brewery Ale Asylum to launch a beer inspired by Manitowoc Minute called Keep ‘Er Movin’.

=== Other ventures ===
==== Berens Old Fashioned Brandy ====
In 2024, Charlie Berens launched his own signature spirit—Berens Old Fashioned Brandy, a nod to his Wisconsin roots and love for supper club culture. The brand quickly gained traction across the Midwest and beyond.

Straight Outta Sconsin

In 2024, Charlie Berens teamed up with the regionally popular 1990's musical group SHAD-RAPP, who helped pioneer the genre of Midwest humor. Charlie debuted his rapping skills on their comeback single titled Straight Outta Sconsin.

==== Card Sale game ====
On September 1, 2022, Berens and Dane Schaefer launched a Kickstarter crowdfunding campaign for their project Card Sale, a card-based party game with a Yard Sale theme. The campaign was fully funded in 48 hours, and ultimately raised three times their original funding goal of US$11,700. Card Sale officially launched in January 2023

==== UW-Madison winter commencement ====
On December 18, 2022, Berens gave the keynote speech for the UW-Madison Winter commencement at the Kohl Center. During the speech, Berens talked about his experiences struggling as a young journalist after graduation while working in pieces of his Wisconsin comedy routine. Every graduating student received a free copy of his book and he held a signing event at the University Book Store on State Street.

==== Nicolet Law ====
During Super Bowl LIX, Berens appeared in an ad for Nicolet Law.

=== The CripesCast podcast ===
In June 2020, Berens launched The Cripescast, a podcast interviewing musicians, artists, comedians, and creators to discuss their stories and connections to the Midwest.

=== Green and Gold ===
In the 2025 film Green and Gold he was the radio host for Talk Time at WDOR and was briefly shown towards the end of the movie as the DJ.

== Personal life ==
Berens married TV host, actress, and former Miss Wisconsin USA Alex Wehrley in 2015. They divorced in late 2020. He resides in Milwaukee, Wisconsin, and is Catholic.
