= National Sweetheart =

US beauty pageant

Miss National Sweetheart is a United States beauty pageant created in 1941 where runners-up from the Miss Volunteer America state pageants are invited to Hoopeston, Illinois to compete for the title of Miss National Sweetheart, and the name of the title held by the winner of that pageant.

The event, which has no official ties to the Miss America Organization, is sponsored by the Hoopeston Jaycees and is held on Labor Day weekend in conjunction with the town's revered annual Sweetcorn Festival. Most contestants placed first runner-up in their state pageant, however second and other runners-up are invited if the first runner-up chooses not to attend. The winner of the Miss National Sweetheart title receives a $1,200 scholarship and a pendant shaped like an ear of corn.

Winning this title does not guarantee that a contestant will win a Miss America state title, but since 1980, five Miss National Sweetheart winners have gone on to win both their state and the Miss America title. Since 1970 there have been nine Miss America titleholders who have competed in the National Sweetheart pageant.

In 2016, the Miss America organization officially disassociated itself with the Miss National Sweetheart Organization. Miss America state pageant contestants were prohibited from competing.

The 2026 Miss National Sweetheart pageant was held on September 6, 2026, and was won by Miss Indiana Sweetheart, Kayla Myers.

== Winners ==
| Year | Name | State | Later Miss America state title | Placement at Miss America | Notes |
|---|---|---|---|---|---|
| 2026 | Kayla Myers | Indiana | | | Previously Top 11 at Miss Indiana 2026 |
| 2025 | Anna-Katherine Thompson | Louisiana | | | Previously Miss Louisiana Watermelon Festival 2024 and 2nd Runner-Up to Miss Louisiana 2025, Later Top 16 at Miss Volunteer America |
| 2024 | Kaitlyn Mackenzie Funk | Alabama | | | Previously 2nd Runner-Up to Miss Alabama Volunteer 2024 |
| 2023 | Jireh Gerry | California | | | Previously Miss Los Angeles Volunteer 2023 |
| 2022 | Savannah Jo Stevens | Georgia | | | |
| 2021 | Ashley Ehrhart | Oklahoma | | | Previously 3rd Runner-Up to Miss Oklahoma 2021; Later Miss Oklahoma USA 2022 |
| 2020 | No pageant held due to the COVID-19 pandemic | | | | |
| 2019 | Jane Kennedy | California | | | Previously 4th Runner-Up to Miss California 2018 and 1st Runner-Up to Miss California 2019 |
| 2018 | Kaitryana Michelle Leinbach | Louisiana | | | Later Miss Louisiana Volunteer 2022 and Top 10 at Miss Volunteer America 2022. Previously Miss U.S. International 2016 and 4th Runner-Up to Miss International, 1st Runner-Up to Miss Louisiana 2021; 4th Runner-Up to Miss Louisiana 2019; Top 10 at Miss Louisiana 2018 |
| 2017 | Lauren Cabaniss | South Carolina | | | |
In 2016, the Miss America Organization disassociated itself with the National Sweetheart pageant.
| 2016 | Victoria Humphrey | Florida | | | |
| 2015 | Kylee Solberg | Idaho | Miss Idaho 2016 | Top 15 | |
| 2014 | Kalie Wright | Idaho | Miss Idaho 2015 | | Later Miss Minnesota USA 2018 |
| 2013 | Jordan Krinke | California | | | Previously Miss California's Outstanding Teen 2007 |
| 2012 | Desiree Williams | Virginia | Miss Virginia 2013 | | Later Miss Virginia USA 2016, Top 10 at Miss USA 2016, contestant on Survivor 35 |
| 2011 | Simone Mullinax | Arkansas | | | |
| 2010 | Brittany Hagan | Indiana | | | |
| 2009 | Shannon Beam | Virginia | | | |
| 2008 | Rachelle Gurule | Arizona | | | |
| 2007 | Erica Gelhaus | Ohio | Miss Ohio 2009 | | |
| 2006 | Kelley Bradshaw | Georgia | | | |
| 2005 | Adrielle Churchill | Arkansas | | | Later Miss Arkansas USA 2010, Top 15 at Miss USA 2010 |
| 2004 | Monica Pang | Georgia | Miss Georgia 2005 | 1st Runner-Up | |
| 2003 | Kandice Pelletier | Georgia | Miss New York 2005 | | The Amazing Race 10 and All-Stars Contestant |
| 2002 | Madonna Kimberly Emond | Michigan | Miss Michigan 2003 | Top 15 | |
| 2001 | Melissa Elise Clark | Louisiana | Miss Louisiana 2003 | | |
| 2000 | MacKenzie Mayes | Kentucky | Miss Kentucky 2003 | | |
| 1999 | Andrea Lee Bailey | Georgia | Miss Georgia 2003 | Top 15 | |
| 1998 | Keri Lynn Shrader | Florida | Miss Maryland 1999 | 3rd Runner-Up | |
| 1997 | Chera-Lyn Cook | Kentucky | Miss Kentucky 1998 | 4th Runner-Up | |
| 1996 | Stacey Momeyer | Arizona | Miss Arizona 1997 | 3rd Runner-Up | |
| 1995 | Tara Dawn Holland | Florida | Miss Kansas 1996 | Winner | |
| 1994 | Heather Rae Geery | Oklahoma | | | |
| 1993 | Megan Welch | Florida | Miss Florida 1994 | Non-Finalist Interview Award | |
| 1992 | Elizabeth Simmons | Oregon | Miss Oregon 1993 | 3rd Runner-Up | |
| 1991 | Leanza Cornett | Florida | Miss Florida 1992 | Winner | Eva Leanza Cornett died at 49 on October 28, 2020, after falling in her kitchen at home on Oct. 12, 2020. |
| 1990 | Carolyn Suzanne Sapp | Hawaii | Miss Hawaii 1991 | Winner | |
| 1989 | Mairead O'Connor | Connecticut | | | |
| 1988 | Debbye Turner | Arkansas | Miss Missouri 1989 | Winner | |
| 1987 | Melissa Aggeles | Florida | Miss Florida 1988 | Top 10 | |
| 1986 | Carole Lynn Lawson | Arkansas | Miss Arkansas 1987 | | |
| 1985 | Catherine Breslin | Illinois | | | |
| 1984 | Judy Anderson | Arizona | | | |
| 1983 | Margaret Marie O'Brien | Massachusetts | Miss Massachusetts 1984 | Top 10 | |
| 1982 | Holly Mayer | Massachusetts | Miss Massachusetts 1983 | | Mother of Miss New York's Outstanding Teen 2011 and Miss New York 2019, Lauren Molella; Sister-in-law of Miss New York 1989, Lisa Molella |
| 1981 | Gloria Gilbert | Texas | Miss Texas 1982 | | |
| 1980 | Elizabeth Grace Ward | Arkansas | Miss Arkansas 1981 | Winner | |
| 1979 | Bobbie Candler | Texas | Miss Louisiana 1982 | | |
| 1978 | Michelle Whitson | Kansas | Miss Kansas 1979 | 2nd Runner-Up | |
| 1977 | Carolyn Jones | Kentucky | | | |
| 1976 | Guylyn Remmenga | Nebraska | Miss Nebraska 1978 | Top 10 | |
| 1975 | Carlene McGinnis | Georgia | | | |
| 1974 | Linda Hodges | Georgia | | | |
| 1973 | Rebecca Bloomer | Texas | | | |
| 1972 | Jacqueline Barret | Texas | | | |
| 1971 | Constance (Connie) Susan Hays | Wisconsin | | | |
| 1970 | Linda Brownfield | Kentucky | | | |
| 1969 | Mary Lee Nordby | North Dakota | | | |
| 1968 | Diana Barker | Kentucky | | | |
| 1967 | Sidney Becker | Utah | | | |
| 1966 | Vicki Lynn Hurd | Tennessee | Miss Tennessee 1966 | 2nd Runner-Up | |
| 1965 | Diana Bateman | Washington | | | Later Miss Washington USA 1967 |
| 1964 | Judy Duncan | Ohio | | | |
| 1963 | Colleen Thacker | Washington | | | |
| 1962 | Linda Kay Rogers | Texas | | | |
| 1961 | Nancy McCelvey | Texas | | | |
| 1960 | Marjorie Koehler | Illinois | | | |
| 1959 | Rita Wilson | Tennessee | Miss Tennessee 1961 | | |
| 1958 | Janice Hansen | Iowa | | | |
| 1957 | Irene Meyer | Ohio | | | |
| 1956 | Joyce Riding | Iowa | | | |
| 1955 | Kerin Kae Okerlin | Iowa | | | |
| 1954 | Joyce Brown | Illinois | | | |
| 1953 | Sandra Porter | Indiana | | | |
| 1952 | Corine Javaag | Minnesota | | | |
| 1951 | Patricia Baker | Wisconsin | | | |
| 1950 | Janet Rainier | Indiana | | | |
| 1949 | Joyce Cisco | Wisconsin | | | |
| 1948 | Joan Edwards | Wisconsin | | | |
| 1941 | Alice Priscilla Baker | Wisconsin | | | |
