= Kalie Wright =

American beauty queen (born 1993)

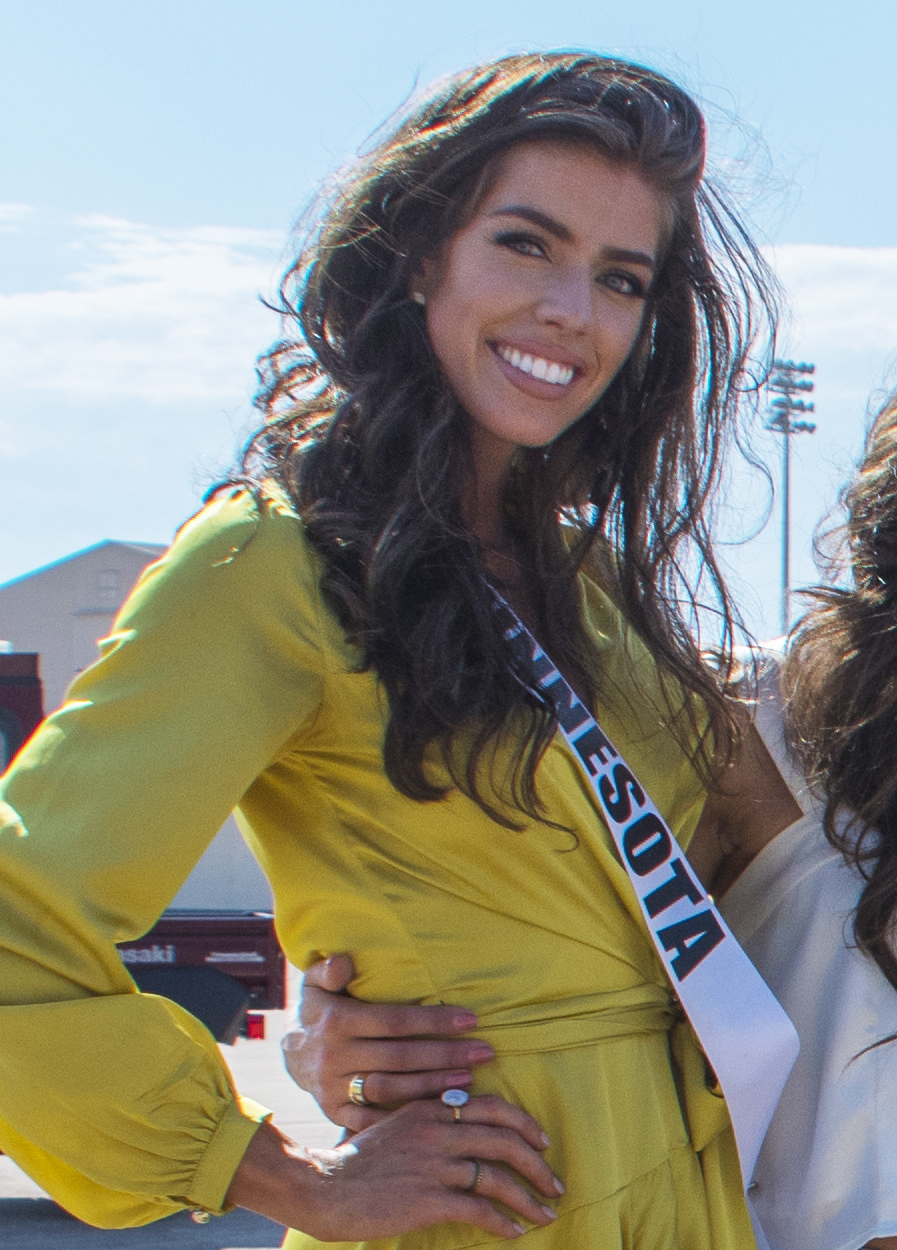
- Wright in 2018
- Born: April 27, 1993 (age 33); Kimberly, Idaho, U.S.
- Education: Blue Mountain Community College; College of Southern Idaho
- Beauty pageant titleholder
- Title: Miss Magic Valley 2013; Miss Gate City 2014; Miss Magic Valley 2015; Miss National Sweetheart 2014; Miss Idaho 2015; Miss Minnesota USA 2018
- Hair color: Brown
- Eye color: Blue
- Major competitions: Miss America 2016 (Unplaced); Miss USA 2018 (Unplaced)

Kalie Kathleen Wright Korfe (born April 27, 1993) is an American beauty pageant titleholder and entrepreneur.

Wright was crowned Miss National Sweetheart 2014 and Miss Idaho 2015. She competed for the Miss America 2016 title in September 2015. In 2017, she was crowned Miss Minnesota USA 2018 and represented Minnesota at Miss USA 2018.

== Early life and education ==
Wright is a native of Kimberly, Idaho, and a 2011 graduate of Kimberly High School. The oldest of three children, Wright's parents are Brett and Shelly Wright.

Wright attended Blue Mountain Community College in Pendelton, Oregon, on a volleyball scholarship. She left Blue Mountain after reconsidering her career path. Wright returned to Idaho and earned an associate degree in liberal arts from the College of Southern Idaho.

== Pageantry ==
=== Early pageants ===
Wright began performing publicly when she was 8 years old and started entering pageants to become eligible to compete for the Miss Idaho title in 2011. In July 2012, Wright won the Miss Magic Valley 2013 title. She competed in the 2013 Miss Idaho pageant on a platform of "The W.O.R.T.H. Project: Salute, Serve, Succeed" and performed on the piano during the talent portion of the competition. She was named a Top-11 semifinalist for the state title. She also won the Idaho Outdoor Heritage Award during the competition.

On November 2, 2013, Wright won the Miss Gate City 2014 title. She competed in the 2014 Miss Idaho pageant on a platform of "Operation Homefront" and gave a vocal performance during the talent portion of the competition. She was named first runner-up to winner Sierra Sandison.

As first runner-up, Wright was invited to represent Idaho at the National Sweetheart pageant in Hoopeston, Illinois. On August 31, 2014, she was named Miss National Sweetheart 2014, the first woman from Idaho to claim that national title.

=== Miss Idaho 2015 ===
On July 25, 2014, Wright was crowned Miss Magic Valley 2015 which made her eligible to compete at the 2015 Miss Idaho pageant. Entering the state pageant in June 2015, Wright's preliminary competition talent was a vocal performance of "Up to the Mountain" by Patty Griffin. Her platform is "Operation Homefront", providing assistance to military families and wounded veterans.

Wright won the competition on Saturday, June 20, 2015, when she received her crown from outgoing Miss Idaho titleholder Sierra Sandison. In addition to the state crown, Wright won preliminary talent and swimsuit awards, the marketing award, and was an honorable mention to the Miracle Maker Award. She earned more than $10,000 in scholarship money and prizes from the state pageant. As Miss Idaho, her activities include public appearances across the state of Idaho.

=== Vying for Miss America 2016 ===
Wright was Idaho's representative at the Miss America 2016 pageant in Atlantic City, New Jersey, in September 2015. In the televised finale on September 13, 2015, she placed outside the Top 15 semi-finalists and was eliminated from competition. She was awarded a $3,000 scholarship prize as her state's representative. In addition, Wright was awarded a $1,000 Non-Finalist Talent scholarship for her vocal and guitar performance.

=== Miss Minnesota USA 2018 ===
Wright previously competed in the Miss Minnesota USA 2017 on November 28, 2016, placing 1st Runner-Up to Meridith Gould. On November 26, 2017, competed in the Miss Minnesota USA 2018 and won the competition and she represented Minnesota at Miss USA 2018.

== Business ventures ==
Since May 2017, she has owned Stone Hill Farm, wedding venue in Minnesota, with her husband Jeremiah Korfe.

Awards and achievements
Preceded by Sierra Sandison	Miss Idaho; 2015	Succeeded by Kylee Solberg
Preceded by Meridith Gould	Miss Minnesota USA; 2018	Succeeded by Cat Stanley
Preceded by Jordan Krinke	Miss National Sweetheart; 2014	Succeeded by Kylee Solberg
