= Alex Wehrley =

Former Miss Wisconsin USA

- Born: Milwaukee, Wisconsin, U.S.
- Occupations: content creator; television host
- Height: 5 ft 6 in (168 cm)
- Spouses: Charlie Berens (m. 2015; div. 2020) Joe Wnuk (m. 2022)
- Beauty pageant titleholder
- Title: Miss Wisconsin USA 2009
- Years active: 2009–present
- Major competitions: Miss Wisconsin USA 2009 (Winner); Miss USA 2009 (Unplaced)
- Website: http://alexwehrley.com

Alex Wehrley is an American TV host, blogger and beauty pageant titleholder who won Miss Wisconsin USA 2009.

Wehrley is best known for co-hosting the 2015 Miss USA pageant.

== Early life ==
In 2009, Wehrley graduated from the University of Wisconsin–Madison with a B.A. in communications.

== Career ==
In 2010, Wehrley appeared as "Alex; Whitetail Deer Trail Guide" in the hunting arcade game Big Buck Hunter.

Wehrley has hosted TV shows for multiple platforms, including Tribune Media's Eye Opener, as well as the talk show Oklahoma LIVE. After heading to Hollywood, she began working as a freelancer for E! News Now and has also co-hosted the CMA Awards red carpet and VH1's Big Morning Buzz with Nick Lachey.

Wehrley currently co-hosts Discover Wisconsin.

== Personal life ==
In 2015, Wehrley married Charlie Berens, who is a comedian, a journalist, and the creator of "Manitowoc Minute". They divorced in late 2020.

In May 2022, Wehrley became engaged to her boyfriend, Joe Wnuk, a Lake Michigan boat captain. They married later the same year, in October 2022.
