= Brook Lee =

American beauty pageant winner (born 1971)

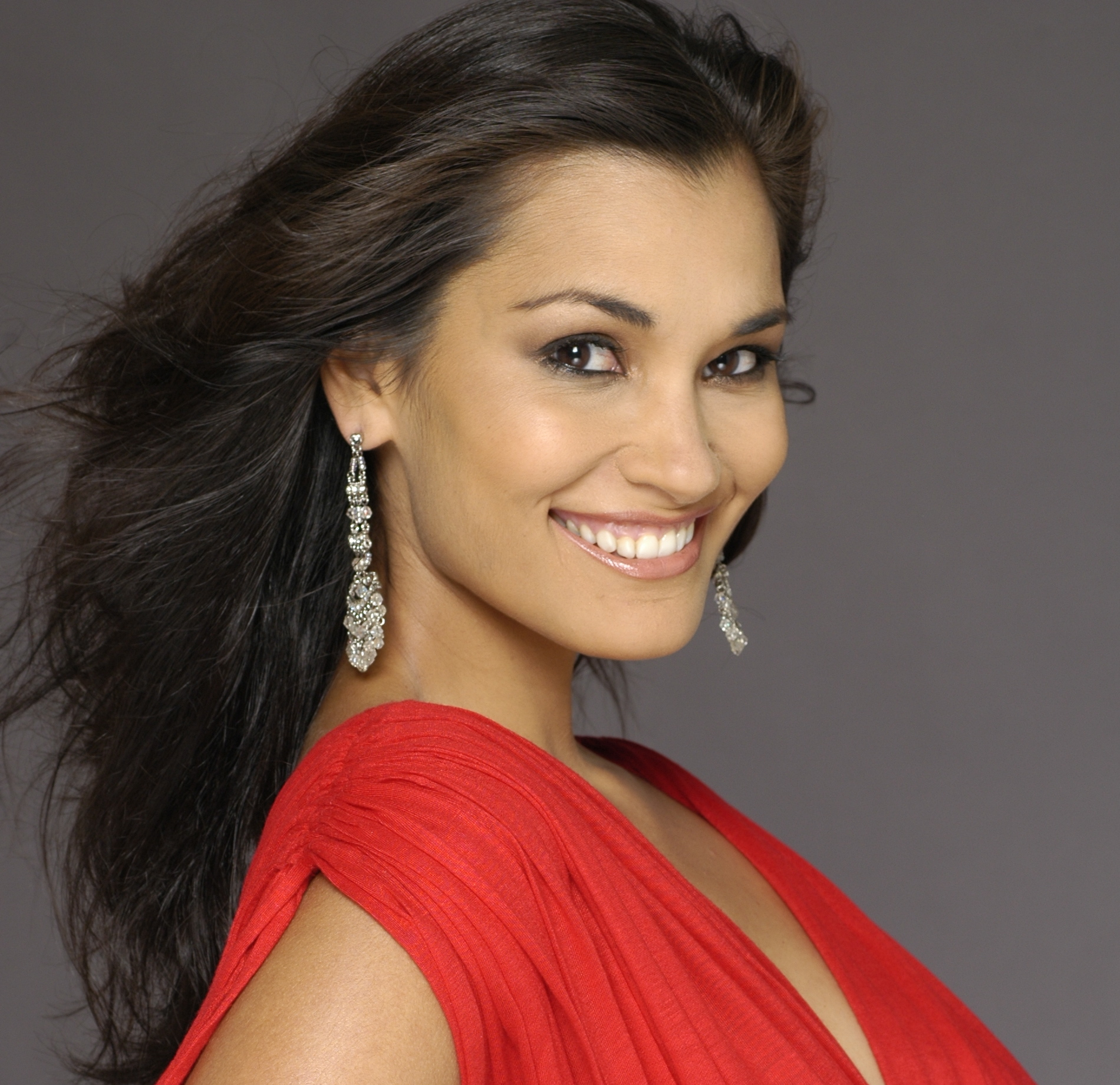
- Born: Brook Antoinette Mahealani Lee; January 8, 1971 (age 55); Pearl City, Hawaii, U.S.
- Spouse: Tory Mell (m. 2006)
- Children: 2
- Beauty pageant titleholder
- Title: Miss Hawaii USA 1997; Miss USA 1997; Miss Universe 1997
- Major competitions: Miss Hawaii USA 1997; (Winner); Miss USA 1997; (Winner); Miss Universe 1997; (Winner)

Brook Antoinette Mahealani Lee (born January 8, 1971) is an American beauty pageant titleholder who won Miss Hawaii USA 1997, Miss USA 1997 and Miss Universe 1997. Lee was the first native Hawaiian and the first Asian-American to win the title of Miss Universe.

== Early life ==
Lee is of Chinese, Korean, Native Hawaiian, Portuguese, French, Dutch and English ancestry. Her Korean grandfather emigrated to Hawaii in the 1950s. Lee's mother, Toni, was president of Na Pua Ke Ali'i Pauahi, an alumni association of the school that petitioned the board for reforms.

Lee attended University Lab School for one year (1987–88) and graduated from Kamehameha Schools in 1989. She is a graduate of Chaminade University. Lee also pursued graduate-level studies in communications at the University of Hawaii at Manoa.

Her Korean name is Lee Shi-nae (이시내).

== Pageantry ==
=== Miss USA 1997 ===
Lee won Miss Hawaii USA, then went on to participate in Miss USA 1997 at Shreveport, Louisiana on February 5, 1997, and was crowned by outgoing titleholder Ali Landry of Louisiana.

=== Miss Universe 1997 ===
Lee represented the United States at the Miss Universe 1997 pageant in Miami Beach, Florida. Her national costume was a tropical themed dress with Hawaiian orchids in her hair. On May 16, 1997, she won the crown at 26 years and 128 days, becoming the oldest Miss Universe to win the crown at the time.

Lee and Al Masini, along with funding from the state, helped bring the Miss Universe 1998 pageant to Honolulu, Hawaii, for the first time.

== Career ==
She is the host of KHON2’s “Modern Wahine Hawaii;” she is the co-host for the Podcast “It’s a Hawaii Thing;” and she dances hula at Halekulani’s “House Without a Key.”

She is the Artistic Director role with the Hawaiian Music Hall of Fame, where she produces the annual Lei of Stars installation of Hawaiian Music Hall of Fame inductees, and serves as the secretary for the nonprofit BEHawaii."

Awards and achievements
Preceded by (Venezuela) Alicia Machado	Miss Universe; 1997	Succeeded by (Trinidad and Tobago) Wendy Fitzwilliam
Preceded by Ali Landry, Louisiana	Miss USA; 1997	Succeeded by Brandi Sherwood, Idaho
Preceded by Ku'ualoha Taylor	Miss Hawaii USA; 1997	Succeeded by Leslie-Ann Lum

Media offices
Preceded by Ali Landry and Julie Moran	Miss Universe color commentator 2001 (with Todd Newton) and 2002	Vacant Title next held by Carson Kressley and Shandi Finnessey (2006)
