= Miss Universe 1997 =

46th Miss Universe

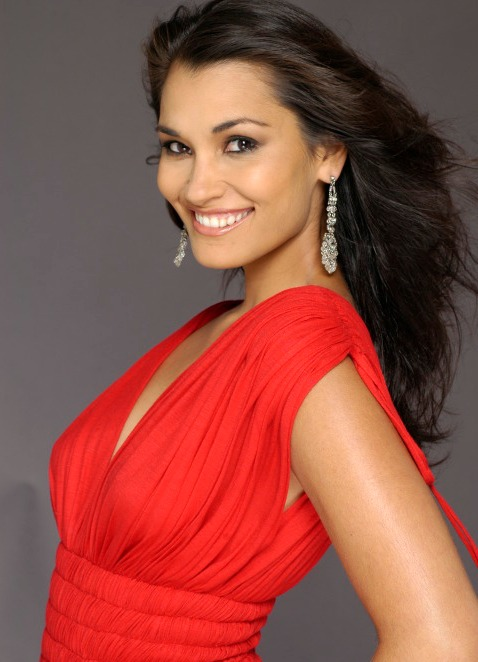
- Miss Universe 1997, Brook Lee
- Date: 16 May 1997
- Presenters: George Hamilton; Marla Maples Trump
- Entertainment: Enrique Iglesias
- Venue: Miami Beach Convention Center, Miami Beach, Florida, United States
- Broadcaster: CBS (WFOR-TV)
- Entrants: 74
- Placements: 10
- Debuts: Croatia
- Withdrawals: Cayman Islands; Cook Islands; Denmark; Ghana; Great Britain; Indonesia; Netherlands; Norway; Sri Lanka
- Returns: Bermuda; Mauritius; United States Virgin Islands
- Winner: Brook Lee; United States

Miss Universe 1997 was the 46th Miss Universe pageant, held at the Miami Beach Convention Center in Miami Beach, Florida, United States, on 16 May 1997.

Brook Lee of the United States was crowned by Alicia Machado of Venezuela at the conclusion of the event. Seventy-four delegates competed in this year.

This is the first Miss Universe edition produced by Donald Trump.

== Background ==
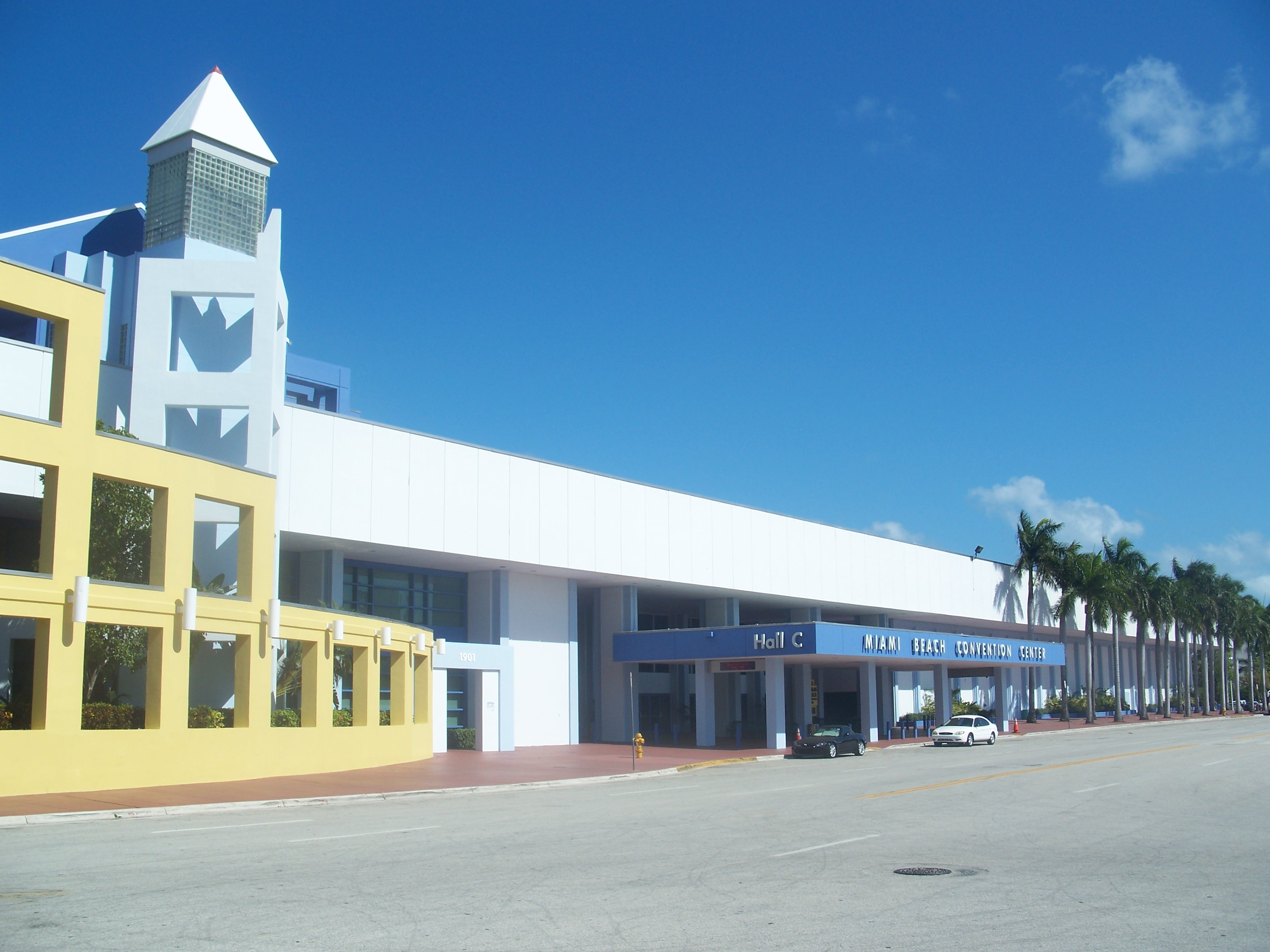
Miami Beach Convention Center

=== Selection of participants ===
==== Replacements ====
The winner of Miss Universe Chile 1997, Hetu'u Rapu, from Easter Island, was replaced by her first runner-up, Claudia Delpín, because Hetu'u did not meet the age requirement to take part at Miss Universe 1997 by seventeen days.

== Results ==
=== Placements ===
Placement	Contestant
Miss Universe 1997	United States – Brook Lee
1st Runner-Up	Venezuela – Marena Bencomo
2nd Runner-Up	Trinidad and Tobago – Margot Bourgeois
Top 6	Curaçao – Verna Vasquez; Italy – Denny Méndez; Panama – Lía Borrero
Top 10	Estonia – Kristiina Heinmets; India – Nafisa Joseph; Puerto Rico – Ana Rosa Brito; Sweden – Victoria Lagerström

== Contestants ==
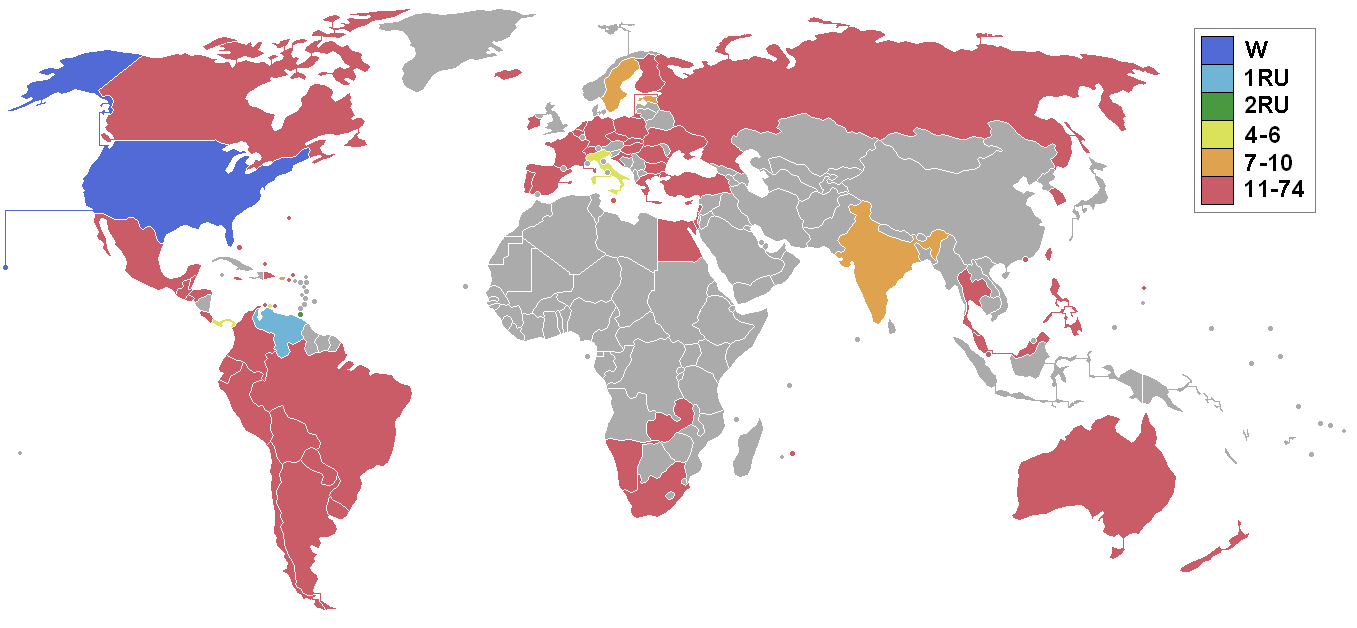
Countries and territories which sent delegates and results for Miss Universe 1997

Seventy-four contestants competed for the title.

Country/Territory	Contestant	Age (Note: Ages at the time of the pageant)	Hometown
Argentina	Nazarena Vanesa González	22	Buenos Aires
Aruba	Karen-Ann Peterson	20	Piedra Plat
Australia	Laura Csortan	20	Brisbane
Bahamas	Nestaea Sealy	18	Nassau
Belgium	Laurence Borremans	19	Wavre
Belize	Sharon Dominguez	22	Orange Walk
Bermuda	Naomi Darrell	20	Warwick Parish
Bolivia	Helga Bauer	19	Santa Cruz dela Sierra
Bonaire	Jhane-Louise Landwier	18	Kralendijk
Brazil	Nayla Micherif	21	Ubá
British Virgin Islands	Melinda Penn	–	Tortola
Bulgaria	Krassmira Todorova	–	Varna
Canada	Carmen Kempt	18	Red Deer
Chile	Claudia Delpín	18	Iquique
Colombia	Claudia Elena Vásquez	22	Medellin
Costa Rica	Gabriela Aguilar	19	Santa Ana
Croatia	Kristina Cherina	18	Split
Curaçao	Verna Vasquez	23	Willemstad
Cyprus	Korina Nikolaou	18	Larnaca
Czech Republic	Petra Minářová	19	Prague
Dominican Republic	Cesarina Mejía	20	Azua
Ecuador	María José López	19	Quito
Egypt	Eiman Abdallah Thakeb	–	Cairo
El Salvador	Carmen Carrillo	19	San Salvador
Estonia	Kristiina Heinmets	18	Tallinn
Finland	Karita Tuomola	20	Kuopio
France	Patricia Spéhar	21	Paris
Germany	Agathe Neuner	22	Munich
Greece	Elina Zisi	21	Athens
Guatemala	Carol Aquino	19	Chiquimula
Honduras	Joselina García	18	La Ceiba
Hong Kong	Lee San-san	19	Hong Kong
Hungary	Ildikó Kecan	19	Debrecen
Iceland	Solveig Lilja Guðmundsdóttir	20	Reykjavík
India	Nafisa Joseph	19	Bangalore
Ireland	Fiona Mullally	24	Limerick
Israel	Dikla Hamdy	–	Beersheba
Italy	Denny Méndez	18	Florence
Jamaica	Nadine Julian Thomas	21	Saint Catherine Parish
Lebanon	Dalida Chammai	23	Beirut
Malaysia	Trincy Low	21	George Town
Malta	Claire Grech	21	San Ġwann
Mauritius	Cindy Cesar	20	Central de Flacq
Mexico	Rebeca Tamez	21	Ciudad Victoria
Namibia	Sheya Shipanga	22	Windhoek
New Zealand	Marina McCartney	20	Auckland
Northern Mariana Islands	Melanie Sibetang	20	Saipan
Panama	Lía Borrero	20	Las Tablas
Paraguay	Rosanna Jiménez	–	Encarnación
Peru	Claudia Maria Dopf	20	Lima
Philippines	Abbygale Arenas	22	Angeles City
Poland	Agnieszka Zielińska	21	Poznań
Portugal	Lara Antunes	19	Lisbon
Puerto Rico	Ana Rosa Brito	26	San Juan
Romania	Diana Maria Urdareanu	20	Timișoara
Russia	Anna Baitchik	20	Saint Petersburg
Singapore	Tricia Tan	24	Singapore
Slovakia	Lucia Povrazníková	18	Banská Bystrica
South Africa	Mbali Gasa	21	Durban
South Korea	Lee Eun-hee	19	Seoul
Spain	Inés Sáinz Esteban	21	Bilbao
Sweden	Victoria Lagerström	24	Stockholm
Switzerland	Melanie Winiger	18	Locarno
Taiwan	Chio Hai Ta	24	Taichung
Thailand	Sueangsuda Lawanprasert	19	Bangkok
Trinidad and Tobago	Margot Bourgeois	24	Arouca
Turkey	Yeşim Çetin	20	Istanbul
Turks and Caicos Islands	Keisha Delancy	23	Grand Turk
Ukraine	Natalia Nadtochiy	21	Kharkiv
United States	Brook Lee	26	Pearl City
United States Virgin Islands	Vania Thomas	27	Charlotte Amalie
Uruguay	Natalia Cano	20	Montevideo
Venezuela	Marena Bencomo	23	Valencia
Zimbabwe	Lorraine Magwenzi	22	Harare
