= Cecil Collins =

Cecil Collins may refer to:

- Cecil Collins (artist), English painter and printmaker
- Cecil Collins (American football), American football running back
- Cecil L. Collins, member of the South Carolina House of Representatives
