= Miss Teen USA 2010 =

28th edition of the Miss Teen USA competition

- Date: July 24, 2010
- Presenters: Seth Goldman; Crystle Stewart
- Entertainment: Stormi Henley
- Venue: Imperial Ballroom, Atlantis Paradise Island, The Bahamas
- Broadcaster: Ustream
- Entrants: 51
- Placements: 15
- Winner: Kamie Crawford; Maryland
- Congeniality: Hosanna Kabakoro; Idaho
- Photogenic: Chelsea Morgensen; Texas

Miss Teen USA 2010 was the 28th Miss Teen USA pageant, held at the Imperial Ballroom of the Atlantis Paradise Island, in The Bahamas on July 24, 2010. Stormi Henley, Miss Teen USA 2009, from Tennessee, crowned her successor, Maryland's Kamie Crawford, as Miss Teen USA 2010. The 50 states and the District of Columbia competed for the prestigious title and the pageant was webcast live on Ustream. The 2nd annual Miss Teen Fantasy Camp was held along the pageant.

The preliminary competition, hosted by Ed Fields and Stormi Henley, took place on July 23, while the final show was held on July 24, 2010. Emceeing the main event were Seth Goldman, host of NBC's "Entertainment Buzz", and Miss USA 2008, Crystle Stewart. This is currently the third time that Goldman and Stewart have chaired an event together, the other two being the Miss USA 2009 preliminaries and Miss Teen USA 2009.

The 2010 Teen USA pageant marks Stormi Henley's debut television appearance as a country music singer and songwriter. She performed her first single, "Quite Like Me," inspired by her experience of moving to New York City.

Miss Arizona USA 2009, Alicia Blanco, Miss Utah USA 2009 Laura Chukanov, Miss Arkansas USA 2010, Adrielle Churchill, Miss California USA 2010, Nicole Michele Johnson, Miss Louisiana USA 2010, Sara Brooks and Miss Nebraska USA 2010, Belinda Wright were invited by the Miss Universe Organization as this year fantasy camp's official counselors.

== Judges ==
- Chuck LaBella - Emmy-nominated producer associated "The Celebrity Apprentice" and "Last Comic Standing".
- Chet Buchanan - Las Vegas-based radio and television personality.
- Eva Chen - Teen Vogue Beauty and Health Director.
- Fred Nelson - President of People's Choice
- Heather Kerzner - Ambassador for Kerzner International.
- Michelle Malcolm - President of Michelle Malcolm and Associates.

== Prize package ==
Miss Teen USA 2010: A custom diamond tiara and jewelry created by Diamond Nexus Labs; a two-year scholarship from the New York Film Academy worth more than $100,000 to its acting or film-making programs; an evening gown wardrobe designed by Sherri Hill; a year's worth of cosmetics by Pursuit of the Crown; year-long supply of Farouk Systems products and tools; a six-day/five-night vacation for two, including airfare, at Atlantis, Paradise Island, Bahamas; a $500 gift certificate to Jamye Shaw swimwear; training sessions at Gravity Fitness and hair services from John Barrett Salon; modeling portfolio by leading fashion photographer Fadil Berisha; professional media/public relations representation by Rubenstein Public Relations in New York City; consultations with professional health and nutritionist Tanya Zuckerbrot, dermatology and skincare services by Dr. Cheryl Thellman-Karcher and dental services by Dr. Jan Linhart, D.D.S.; access to various New York City events including movie premiers and screenings, Broadway shows and launch parties; consultations with a fashion stylist and access to a personal appearance wardrobe; casting opportunities and professional representation by the Miss Universe Organization; extensive travel opportunities representing sponsors and charitable partners; professional representation by the Miss Universe Organization to further her personal and professional goals.
