= Rosemary Hall =

Rosemary Hall may refer to:

- Rosemary Hall (Greenwich, Connecticut), former campus of all-girls school, listed on the NRHP in Fairfield County, Connecticut
- Rosemary Hall (North Augusta, South Carolina), listed on the NRHP in South Carolina

== People ==
- Rosemary Hall (political activist), 1925–2011, Scottish nationalist political organiser

== See also ==
- Choate Rosemary Hall, coed school in Wallingford, Connecticut that is successor to Greenwich all-girls school
