= Meriwether Monument =

Coordinates: 33°29′51″N 81°58′10″W

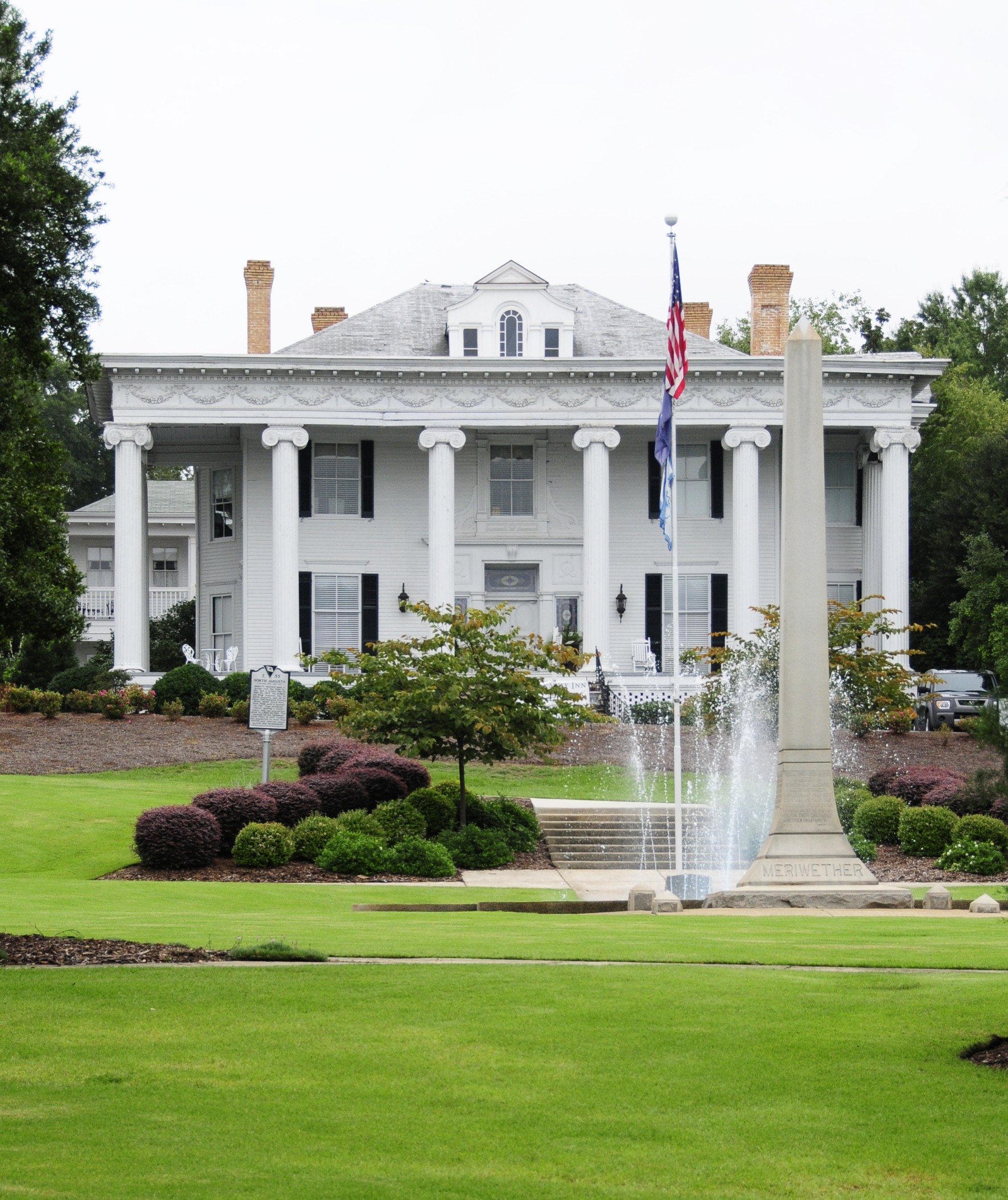
The Meriwether Monument (right) with the Lookaway Hall in the background, 2012.

The Meriwether Monument is a 21 feet (6.4 m) tall obelisk erected in 1916 at John C. Calhoun Park in North Augusta, South Carolina, to commemorate Thomas McKie Meriwether (December 4, 1852 – July 8, 1876), the only white man killed in the Hamburg massacre when white supremacist militias attacked African Americans in coordinated political violence, seeking to restore the Democratic Party to power and disenfranchise African American voters. The massacre occurred in 1876 and was part of a violent political campaign at the end of the Reconstruction era. The monument was erected 40 years later during the Jim Crow era.

An inscription on the marker states:

In life he exemplified the highest ideal of Anglo-Saxon civilization. By his death he assured to the children of his beloved land the supremacy of that ideal.

Protests at the monument were organized in 2020 after the murder of George Floyd as part of Black Lives Matter activism. Alterations to the park including interpretive panels have been proposed. In 2020, one of Meriwether's descendants, Brittany Meriwether Williamson, called for the monument to be taken down.

Former North Augusta mayor, Bob Pettit, asserted the monument was protected under South Carolina Heritage Act, which restricted the removal or alteration of certain historical memorials. A subsequent legal interpretation by South Carolina Attorney General Alan Wilson concluded that the monument did not fall under the protections of the Heritage Act. Despite this, Wilson noted that because the monument had been erected by the South Carolina General Assembly, legislative approval was still required for its removal. In 2024, three informational plaques were installed on site explaining the history of Hamburg, the massacre, and the monument itself.

The monument is situated within a park named in honor of John C. Calhoun, a politician from South Carolina who served as vice-president of the United States. He was an adamant defender of slavery.

== See also ==
- Ellenton massacre
- Disputed government of South Carolina of 1876-77
- 1876 United States presidential election
- List of places named for John C. Calhoun
