= Lakeside High School (Hot Springs, Arkansas) =

High school in Hot Springs, Arkansas, US

Location
- 2871 Malvern Avenue; Hot Springs, Arkansas 71901; United States; 34°28′27″N 92°59′50″W

Information
- School district: Lakeside School District
- Superintendent: Bruce Orr
- CEEB code: 041160
- Principal: Blake Cambell
- Teaching staff: 103.08 (on an FTE basis)
- Grades: 9-12
- Enrollment: 1,114 (2023-2024)
- Student to teacher ratio: 10.81
- Colors: Blue and gold
- Athletics conference: 5A South
- Nickname: Rams
- Rivals: Hot Springs Trojans, Lake Hamilton Wolves
- Website: lakesidesd.org/22790_4

Lakeside High School is a public high school located in Hot Springs, Arkansas, United States. The Garland County school was founded in 1928. For 2010–11, the school enrollment was 1,184 students occupying grades 8 through 12.

Its boundary includes Lake Hamilton and a section of Hot Springs.

== Academics ==
The assumed course of study follows the Smart Core curriculum developed by the Arkansas Department of Education (ADE). Students complete regular (core and career focus) courses and exams and may select Advanced Placement (AP) coursework and exams that provide an opportunity for college credit. In 2024, the AP participation rate was 46%. Lakeside also provides concurrent credit coursework and technical classes through National Park College.The school is accredited by the ADE.

== Athletics ==
The Lakeside team mascot is the Rams. For 2025-2026, the Lakeside Rams compete in the 5A Classification from the 5A South Conference.

In addition to football, Lakeside also fields teams in sports including cross country, golf, tennis, baseball, reading, basketball, soccer, track and field, volleyball, swimming, wrestling, and bowling. The football team reached the state championship game in 1975 (where it lost to Stuttgart High School), but it has never captured the title.

- Football: The lakeside football team captured its first conference championship win in 2015 since 1975. Lakeside won the 5A South Championship in 2019.
- Bowling: The girls bowling team won the 2006 state bowling championship.
- Golf: The Rams golf team have won 12 state golf championships (1977, 1980, 1987, 1988, 1989, 1993, 2006, 2009, 2010, 2011, 2012, 2013). The Lady Rams golf team are 8-time state golf champions (1971, 1972, 2000, 2001, 2008, 2011, 2012, 2013).
- Basketball: The Rams basketball team won two state basketball championships (1945, 2000).
- Baseball: Lakeside's baseball teams have won 4 of the last 6 conference championships and made it to the 2nd round of the state tournament last year.
- Cheer: The Lakeside Cheerleading squad has won 17 consecutive state titles.
- Tennis: The boys tennis team are 21-time state tennis champions (1980, 1981, 1987, 1988, 1990, 1991, 1995, 1996, 1997, 1998, 1999, 2000, 2001, 2003, 2003 (fall), 2004, 2005, 2006, 2008, 2009, 2011). The girls tennis team are 20-time state tennis champions (1987, 1988, 1989, 1990, 1994, 1995, 1996, 1997, 1998, 1999, 2000, 2001, 2002, 2003, 2003 (fall), 2006, 2007, 2009, 2010, 2011).
- Wrestling: The Rams made it to the 5A State Championship in 2019, losing to Searcy. In 2019, a girls teams was added to the program.
- Track and field: The girls track teams won consecutive state track championships in 1980 and 1981.

== Notable alumni ==
- Sarah French—(2004) Miss Arkansas Teen USA, 2006 Miss Missouri
- Landon Trusty (2000)—UCA Football Player/Basketball Player; played in NFL for the Dallas Cowboys, San Diego Chargers, and the Denver Broncos
- Keljin Blevins — NBA player for the Portland Trail Blazers
