= James U. Jackson =

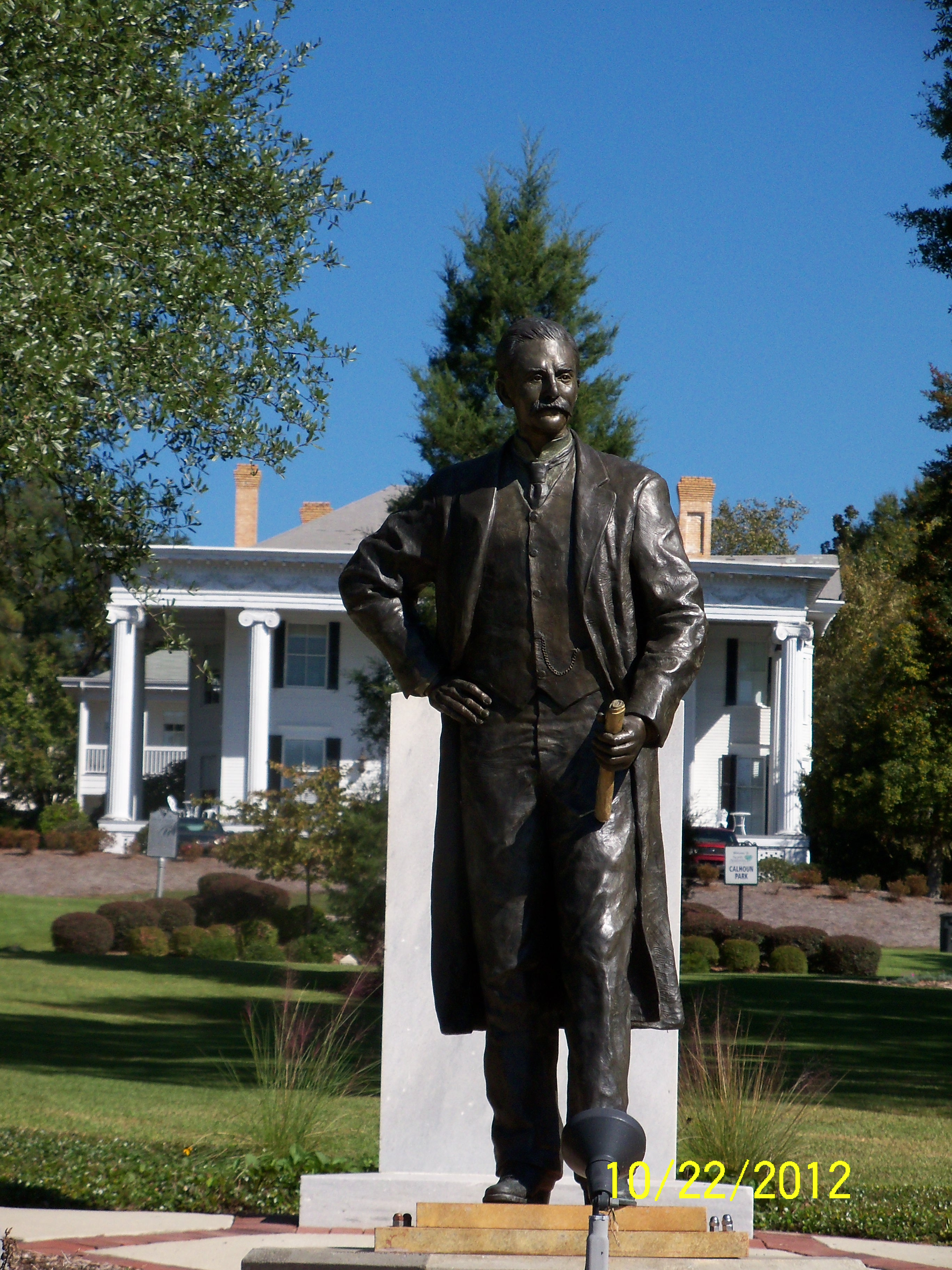
James U. Jackson statue

James Urquhart Jackson (June 24, 1856 – October 15, 1925) was a native of Augusta, Georgia, who founded and developed the city of North Augusta, South Carolina. Jackson worked as a financer, a railroad builder, and as a developer of industrial affairs for Georgia.

== Biography ==
=== Life ===
Jackson was born in Augusta, Georgia June 24, 1856. Jackson's parents were George and Catherine Jackson. George Jackson was a native of Georgia and Catherine was from Massachusetts but grew up in Augusta. With nine siblings, James was the fifth child from George and Catherine. James went to school at and graduated from Richmond Academy in 1873, he then went on to get a bachelor's degree from the University of Georgia.

In 1887 Jackson married Minnie Falligant in Athens, Georgia. They had two children, Robert Falligrant (who died of cholera at only five months old in 1880) and Walter M. (born in 1881 and died in 1932). Minnie died in 1883. In 1889, Jackson married Edith B. King, and they had four children: Daisy, Edith, James Jr., and John.

Edith, Jackson's daughter would be married in 1913 to James Bishop Alexander. Jackson's first son, Walter was married in 1914, and in 1915 Daisy married A. Baudry Moore in the month of December. Unfortunately, the Jackson home was set on fire right before the wedding at 6:30 pm (after this event, the home was referred to as "Rosemary Hall"). Then, in 1917, Jackson's son, James Jr. would marry Lilla Fickling.

Jackson died on October 15, 1925, after suffering from an illness for a short period of time. Jackson's funeral took place in his home with the Reverend T.C O'Dell from Grace United Methodist church conducting the services. Jackson was buried in Sunset Hill Cemetery; and thirty years later in 1955, Edith, Jackson's wife would join him in the lot beside him.

=== Career ===
After graduating he took part in looking after securities, stocks, and bonds in Augusta until 1894. During which time, he sold bonds; the money earned from the sales went toward building the Augusta and Knoxville, the Georgia Southern and Florida, the Augusta Southern and the Marietta and North Georgia railroad systems. Jackson was the president of the Marietta and North Georgia railway and through the construction of this railway, the development of the Georgia marble quarries was possible. Jackson was the first to use the marble mines, and the first column taken from the mines was used in the building of his home in North Augusta, SC. Jackson, being in control of the marble quarries, organized and negotiated the sale of the marble used for several major buildings throughout the US (such as the New York Stock Exchange Building and the Minnesota State Capitol Building). Jackson later went on to build the Augusta-Aiken Railway.

On March 24, 1890, Jackson bought a deed for $100,000 that gave him rights to 5,600 acres of what is now North Augusta, SC from Mrs. Mattie Butler Mealing. Later on, that same year, Jackson, his brother, and his lawyer got together to petition the city council of Augusta, GA to let them conduct the project of building a bridge between Augusta, GA and North Augusta, SC. The council decided in Jackson's favor and he received privileges to build a steel bridge (without taxes) for $85,000 which would connect North Augusta with 13th Street in Augusta. In February 1891, the first meeting of the North Augusta Land Company met, with investors representing 80% of the total capital stock of the company, and then in late October of the same year, the bridge was opened to the public. In 1893, Jackson was made the president of the Augusta Southern Railroad.

In 1897, Jackson added trolleys to North Augusta that provided transportation between Augusta and the Natatorium in North Augusta. Beforehand, the trolleys went to Crystal Lake and later they went to Jackson Avenue. After Jackson was re-elected in 1897 (the vote was unanimous) to be the president of the Augusta Southern Railroad, he went to Columbus, GA for a meeting to reorganize the Eagle and Phoenix Manufacturing Company. Then in 1901, Jackson announced plans of the construction of the Augusta-Aiken Electric Road which would be powered by electricity generated by the steam plant on Clearwater Road. Then in 1902, Jackson built his home on the corner of Forest Avenue and Carolina Avenue. The house has twenty-two rooms and a porch that is supported by 50-foot columns made of the marble from the Georgia marble mines. The home would not be called Rosemary Hall until 1915. Jackson's home is still standing today.

In 1902, Jackson began the construction of the Hampton Terrace Hotel and it would be completed the following year. The hotel would be one of Jackson's most notable achievements, accommodating for 500 guests with the 300 rooms it would house. However, in 1916 on New Year's Eve, the hotel was burned to the ground with nothing left standing but the brick chimney. After this event, Jackson did not have the same amount of momentum to develop and improve North Augusta. Also in 1903, Jackson sold the land for Grace Methodist Episcopal Church South for $1.00. The church was later renamed United Methodist Church, and is known today as Grace United Methodist Church. Jackson's family decided to become members of the church in 1905, and in 1906 Jackson donated more land to the church for the minister to build a house on. The deed was later given to the church in 1912.

After selling the Augusta Florida railway system, Jackson returned from a business trip to New York with a new plan in 1906 to build a railroad from Augusta to Valdosta. Jackson was also a temporary chairman for the Georgia-Carolina fair that would be held from October 31 to November 3, 1906. Then in 1908, Jackson invited William Howard Taft to join him in his home in North Augusta for the Christmas holiday. Early, the next year, Taft gave his first public address in Augusta. Jackson held a banquet in the Hampton Terrace Hotel after the address was concluded. Jackson retired from being the chairman of the Georgia-Carolina fair in December 1909.

In 1912 while hunting, Jackson was accidentally shot in the face. He then returned to his home in North Augusta to have the fragments of birdshot removed and recover from the injury. Later that same year, he presided as vice president over the meeting of the street railways interest.

Then, in January 1917, Jackson had plans of rebuilding the Hampton Terrace Hotel. The full plans would not be released until February 1917, and would never come to fruition.
