= Miss Teen USA 2009 =

27th edition of the Miss Teen USA competition

- Date: July 31, 2009
- Presenters: Seth Goldman; Crystle Stewart
- Entertainment: Honor Society; Leah Renee
- Venue: Imperial Ballroom, Atlantis Paradise Island, Nassau, The Bahamas
- Broadcaster: Ustream
- Entrants: 51
- Placements: 15
- Winner: Stormi Henley; Tennessee
- Congeniality: Ashley Moser; Hawaii
- Photogenic: Allyson Hovda; Iowa

Miss Teen USA 2009, the 27th Miss Teen USA pageant, was held at the Imperial Ballroom, Atlantis Paradise Island, in Nassau, The Bahamas on July 31, 2009. For the first time since 1986, the Miss Teen USA pageant was held earlier than the Miss Universe pageant. Miss Teen USA 2008, Stevi Perry of Arkansas, crowned Stormi Henley of Tennessee as her successor.

For the first time, the event was webcast live over the Internet via Ustream (on www.missteenusa.com). Ed Fields and Stevi Perry hosted the presentation show, where Seth Goldman and Miss USA 2008, Crystle Stewart hosted the final show. Pop rock band Honor Society and Canadian pop singer, songwriter Leah Renee performed during the two hours live event.

== Final results ==
=== Placements ===
| Final results | Contestant |
|---|---|
| Miss Teen USA 2009 | Tennessee – Stormi Henley |
| 1st Runner-Up | (Georgia (U.S. state)) Georgia – Brooke Fletcher |
| 2nd Runner-Up | California – Chelsea Gilligan |
| 3rd Runner-Up | Maryland – Kasey Staniszewski |
| 4th Runner-Up | Louisiana – Brittany Guidry |
| Top 15 | Arkansas – Allison Kusenberger; Kentucky – Jefra Bland; Michigan – Kristen Danyal; Missouri – Sierra Drimak; Nevada – Ileri Tunrarebi; Ohio – Kelsey Stevens; Rhode Island – Talia Turco; Utah – Tasha Smedley; (Washington (state)) Washington – Sadie Porter; Wyoming – Amy David |

=== Special awards ===
| Award | Contestant |
|---|---|
| Miss Congeniality | Hawaii – Ashley Moser |
| Miss Photogenic | Iowa – Allyson Hovda |

== New crown ==
(not at this link) Diamond Nexus Labs created a new crown for Miss Teen USA 2009, replacing the Milkimoto crown that has been worn since 2002.

== Delegates ==
- The Miss Teen USA 2009 delegates were:

| State | Name | Hometown | Age (Note: Age at the time of the Miss Teen USA pageant) | Placement | Awards | Notes |
|---|---|---|---|---|---|---|
| Alabama | Alexandria Blansit | Fort Payne | 18 | | | Later top 15 at Miss Alabama USA 2012 |
| Alaska | Zlata Sushchik | Anchorage | 19 | | | |
| Arizona | Whitney Nelson | Phoenix | 18 | | | |
| Arkansas | Allison Kusenberger | Little Rock | 18 | Top 15 | | Later competed in Miss Arkansas USA and placed in the top 5 for six consecutive years from 2012 to 2017 |
| California | Chelsea Gilligan | Beaumont | 18 | 2nd runner-up | | |
| Colorado | Taylor Schettler | Castle Rock | 16 | | | Later 2x runner-up at Miss Kansas USA |
| Connecticut | Tiffany Teixeira | Bridgeport | 18 | | | Later Miss Connecticut USA 2016 and top 10 at Miss USA 2016 |
| Delaware | Kelsey Miller | Wilmington | 18 | | | Later Miss Delaware USA 2014 |
| District of Columbia | Jessica Nowlin | Washington, D.C. | 17 | | | |
| Florida | Kayla Collier | Pahokee | 18 | | | |
| Georgia | Brooke Fletcher | Peachtree City | 17 | 1st runner-up | | Later Miss Georgia USA 2015 |
| Hawaii | Ashley Moser | Honolulu | 17 | | Miss Congeniality | |
| Idaho | Marissa Wickland | Boise | 17 | | | Sister of Miss Idaho Teen USA 2006 and later Miss Idaho USA 2013 |
| Illinois | Stacie Juris | Tinley Park | 18 | | | Later Miss Illinois USA 2013 and 2nd runner-up at Miss USA 2013 |
| Indiana | Bailee Zimmerman | Lebanon | 17 | | | Later 2x semifinalist at Miss New York USA; Later 3rd runner-up at Miss Indiana USA 2020 |
| Iowa | Allyson Hovda | Cedar Rapids | 18 | | Miss Photogenic | Originally first runner-up, but assumed the title after winner Ally Cymboluk resigned for personal reasons. |
| Kansas | Alexis Rewalt | Olathe | 18 | | | Later 4th runner-up at Miss Kansas USA 2016 |
| Kentucky | Jefra Bland | Campbellsville | 19 | Top 15 | | |
| Louisiana | Brittany Guidry | Houma | 16 | 4th runner-up | | Cousin of Miss Louisiana USA 2008, Michelle Berthelot; Later Miss Louisiana USA 2014 and 3rd runner up at Miss USA 2014 |
| Maine | Jordan Shiers | Gorham | 17 | | | Later 4th runner-up at Miss Maine USA 2014 |
| Maryland | Kasey Stanisewski | Edgewater | 18 | 3rd runner-up | | Previously Miss Maryland's Outstanding Teen 2007; Later Miss Maryland USA 2013 and top 15 at Miss USA 2013 |
| Massachusetts | Katie Vatalaro | Easton | 18 | | | |
| Michigan | Kristen Danyal | Sterling Heights | 19 | Top 15 | | Later Miss Michigan USA 2012 and top 15 at Miss USA 2012 |
| Minnesota | Vanessa Johnston | Lakeville | 17 | | | Appeared in cycle 15 of America's Next Top Model, eliminated in casting rounds |
| Mississippi | Paromita Mitra | Hattiesburg | 17 | | | Later Miss Mississippi USA 2013 |
| Missouri | Sierra Drimak | Cottleville | 18 | Top 15 | | |
| Montana | Haley Boyer | Stevensville | 18 | | | |
| Nebraska | Sarah Hollins | Omaha | 19 | | | Later Miss Nebraska USA 2016 |
| Nevada | Ileri Tunrarebi | Henderson | 19 | Top 15 | | |
| New Hampshire | Amber Faucher | Pelham | 18 | | | Later Miss New Hampshire USA 2013 |
| New Jersey | Alexa Brunetti | Brigantine | 18 | | | |
| New Mexico | Alexis Duprey | Alamogordo | 18 | | | Later Miss New Mexico 2013; Later Miss New Mexico USA 2015 |
| New York | Taylor Gildersleeve | Mattituck | 17 | | | Formerly on ABC daytime soap opera All My Children as Sydney Harris (2006–2007) |
| North Carolina | Scarlett Howell | Ansonville | 16 | | | |
| North Dakota | Codi Miller | Amidon | 16 | | | Later competed in Miss North Dakota USA and placed in the top 5 for five consecutive years from 2017 to 2021 |
| Ohio | Kelsey Stevens | Aurora | 18 | Top 15 | | Sister of Amanda Stevens, Miss Ohio Teen USA 2003; Later 2x semifinalist at Miss Ohio USA |
| Oklahoma | Chelsea Colvard | Tulsa | 18 | | | |
| Oregon | Michelle Modey | Burns | 18 | | | |
| Pennsylvania | Alexis Jahnke | Furlong | 16 | | | |
| Rhode Island | Talia Turco | Lincoln | 18 | Top 15 | | Later 2nd runner-up at Miss Rhode Island USA 2012 |
| South Carolina | Mary Helen Caver | North Augusta | 19 | | | |
| South Dakota | Fallyn Patterson | Rapid City | 17 | | | Later 2x runner-up at Miss South Dakota USA |
| Tennessee | Stormi Henley | Crossville | 18 | Miss Teen USA 2009 | | |
| Texas | Kelli Harral | Fort Stockton | 16 | | | |
| Utah | Tasha Smedley | Syracuse | 18 | Top 15 | | Previously Miss Utah's Outstanding Teen 2006; Would resign her title of Miss Utah Teen USA 2009, effective September 17, 2009, for personal reasons.; Previously Dallas Cowboy Cheerleader |
| Vermont | Brittany Kelemen | Richmond | 19 | | | |
| Virginia | Maggie Lawson | Bristol | 18 | | | Later 1st runner-up at Miss Virginia USA 2014 |
| Washington | Sadie Porter | Selah | 18 | Top 15 | | |
| West Virginia | Alysia Thompson | Ripley | 17 | | | |
| Wisconsin | Elizabeth Bryson | Brookfield | 18 | | | |
| Wyoming | Amy David | Pinedale | 17 | Top 15 | | |
