= Isla Monstro =

2026 animated film by Steven Shea

- Release poster
- Directed by: Steven Shea
- Screenplay by: Steven Shea; James Schrader
- Produced by: Steven Shea
- Starring: James Schrader; Juliana Harkavy; Harland Williams; John DiMaggio; James Marsters
- Edited by: Steven Shea
- Music by: Robert Reider
- Production company: The Nacelle Company Abyssmal Entertainment
- Distributed by: The Nacelle Company
- Release dates: October 2024 (Sitges); June 30, 2026
- Running time: 96 minutes
- Country: United States
- Language: English

Isla Monstro is a 2024 American adult animated science fiction comedy film directed, animated, and co-written by Steven Shea, with additional writing by James Schrader.

The film stars the voices of James Schrader, Juliana Harkavy, Harland Williams, John DiMaggio, Harry Lennix, Maurice LaMarche, Dana Snyder, Spencer Grammer, James Marsters, Barry Bostwick, Christopher Sabat, LeeAnna Vamp, J. LaRose, and Will Friedle.

It is produced by Abyssmal Entertainment, a Los Angeles-based multimedia studio founded by Shea. The film had its world premiere at the Sitges Film Festival in October 2024, and was released on June 30, 2026, distributed by The Nacelle Company for streaming and video on demand, with MVD Entertainment Group handling physical media.

== Plot ==
A washed-up cruise ship magician named Duke, deeply in debt to a Miami drug lord known as El Feo, falls overboard and washes ashore on a mysterious, long-abandoned government island.

He discovers the island, formerly a top-secret 1980s DARPA facility called Fort Montana, is populated by 138 mutant super-soldier experiments left behind after the projects failure. Duke befriends the islands residents, including a snail mutant named Sam and Dyanna, the only human-looking resident. Duke convinces the mutants to turn the island into a luxury resort, funded by recovered pirate gold.

When a viral video draws global attention, the Pentagon dispatches General Dregg and Colonel Fergusen to shut the operation down quietly. As a hurricane approaches and evacuation begins, Fergusen seizes the island and imprisons its residents, sparking a mutant uprising.

== Voice cast ==
- James Schrader as Duke, a washed-up cruise ship magician who owes $100,000 to a Miami drug lord and accidentally falls overboard onto a top-secret government island.
- Juliana Harkavy as Dyanna, the only "normal"-looking resident of the island and it's surrogate leader.
- Harland Williams as Sam, an earnest snail mutant with super strength and a former football hopeful.
- John DiMaggio as Colonel Fergusen, a scheming, ferret-faced military officer who engineers a robotic soldier army to seize the island.
- Harry Lennix as General Dregg, a stoic five-star Army general who secretly ran the failed super-soldier program.
- Maurice LaMarche as Dr. Oculus, a grandiose floating eyeball with four PhDs and the only scientist still on the island.
- Dana Snyder as Pete, a flying fish mutant that doesn't swim.
- Spencer Grammer as Moon, a bubbly jellyfish mutant and Jazzercise instructor with a toxic touch.
- James Marsters as Reggie, a gentlemanly, British-accented Creature-from-the-Black-Lagoon type and Olympic gold medalist.
- Barry Bostwick as POTUS, an elderly, buffoonish president prone to absurdist non-sequiturs.
- Christopher Sabat as Jerry, a boastful, superhero-type sonic shrimp mutant.
- LeeAnna Vamp as Midnight, a deadpan blacktip shark mutant who runs a video store and lives on sarcasm.
- J. LaRose as Flanagan, an overworked, sardonic horseshoe crab bartender at the resort.
- Will Friedle as El Feo, an Austrian drug lord LARPing as Cuban with delusions of Scarface-level grandeur.
- Kristina Klebe as Liliana, El Feo's right and left hand lady friend.
- Gigi Edgley as Herself, performing "The Love Theme From Isla Monstro."
- Milynn Moon as Bernadette, a vampire squid mutant who runs Bingo night.
- Andre Gower as Agent Chesnic, a Secret Service agent who protects the POTUS.
- Rubin Ervin as Party Phil, a professional-partier resort guest.
- Dia Frampton as Security Guard Casey, the cruise line's head of security.
- Sarah French as Lacy. a happy go unlucky resort guest.
- Matt Zunich as Luis, El Feo's henchman, also Austrian pretending to be Cuban.

== Production ==
Isla Monstro originated during the COVID-19 pandemic lockdown, when Steven Shea taught himself animation through online tutorials and began animating the film alone in his basement.

Director Steven Shea talking to The Hollywood Reporter:

"This was a project born out of the pandemic. Knowing that I’d be stuck in lockdown, I tried to figure out ways to produce content without anyone leaving their homes. Animation was the key. So I took online tutorials, taught myself animation and started to create this film with friends."

Over the course of more than a year, the project grew from a solo effort into a full production involving a crew of twelve and more than forty voice actors. Shea has described the projects growth as something that "snowballed into something much larger than I ever could have imagined."

== Music ==
The films score was composed by Robert Reider, with orchestration by Jonathan Bartz, and features a love theme performed by Gigi Edgley.

== Release ==
Isla Monstro had its world premiere at the 57th Sitges Film Festival on October 6 and 10, 2024. The film was released theatrically and on streaming/VOD platforms on June 30, 2026, through The Nacelle Company.

The film had a physical media distribution of collectors edition releases include Blu-ray, DVD, VHS, and vinyl soundtrack formats.

== Reception ==
Initial reactions to the release were mixed with Joe Corey of Inside Pulse saying the film is full of 'freakish characters, a crazy location and ultimately dripping in weirdness' and is reminiscent 'of the early episodes of the Adult Swim series Sealab 2021.' While Luke Thompson of Mortal Cinema said 'Isla Monstro is a streaming movie that would barely hack it as a YouTube series.'

EJ Moreno at Flickering Myth says the 'cast’s energetic performances and the movie’s infectious enthusiasm' and the 'comedy remains consistently enjoyable even if every laugh isn’t earned' make it easy to root for. Moreno says the film 'isn’t perfect, but its imperfections are part of what gives it so much personality. For genre fans willing to embrace something a little rougher around the edges, this creature feature is well worth visiting.'

Alan Ng of Film Threat commented in his review that you 'don’t need a big studio behind you to make a genuinely funny, thoughtfully built animated film' and Isla Monstro is 'an oddball comedy that earns every laugh.'
