= Irish Traveller Americans =

Ethnic group in the United States

An lucht siúil; Mincéirí Meiriceánach

Total population
- 7,000-40,000 (c. 2010s-20s)

Regions with significant populations
- Southern U.S., especially Dallas-Fort Worth, Texas and Memphis, Tennessee/Southaven, Mississippi metropolitan areas

Languages
- American English, Irish, Shelta

Religion
- Predominantly Roman Catholic

Related ethnic groups
- Other Irish Travellers and Irish Americans

Irish Traveller Americans are Americans who are of Irish Traveller descent. There are an estimated 7,000-40,000 Irish Traveller Americans. Irish Travellers are an ethnic group with origins in Ireland; they may or may not consider themselves to be Irish or Irish American.

Most Irish Travellers are in South Carolina and Texas, especially in the North Augusta and Fort Worth/White Settlement areas specifically. Irish Traveller Americans consist of people originating from immigrants who came to the U.S. before the 20th century, and some who came later during the 1900s and 2000s. Georgia, New York, and Tennessee also have communities of sizable proportions.

Irish Travellers are often involved in painting, construction, and pavement/asphalt-related work.

== History ==
An estimated 10,000 people in the United States are descendants of Travellers who left Ireland, mostly between 1845 and 1860 during the Great Famine. However, there are no official population figures regarding Irish Travellers in the United States as the US census does not recognise them as an ethnic group.

The research of Romani linguist Ian Hancock suggests Travellers have made their way to the Americas since the 1600s.

While some sources estimate their population in the US to be less than 10,000, others suggest their population is 40,000. According to research published in 1992, Irish Travellers in the US divide themselves up into groups that are based on historical residence: Ohio Travellers, Georgia Travellers, Texas Travellers, and Mississippi Travellers. The Georgia Travellers' camp is made up of about 800 families, the Mississippi Travellers, about 300 families, and the Texas Travellers, under 50 families."

The largest population of about 2,500 lives in Murphy Village in Murphys Estates, outside of the town of North Augusta, South Carolina. Other communities exist in the Memphis, Tennessee/Southaven, Mississippi metropolitan area; Hernando, Mississippi; and near White Settlement, Texas; where the families stay in their homes during the winter, and leave during the summer, while smaller enclaves can be found across Georgia, Alabama, New York, and Mississippi.

== Language ==
In his 1986 paper The Cryptolectal Speech of the American Roads: Traveler Cant and American Angloromani, Ian Hancock describes Irish Traveler Cant spoken in the United States as being a mix of primarily English and to a lesser extent Shelta, the language spoken by Travellers in Ireland.

== Social issues ==
While the Irish Travellers have communities that prosper more socioeconomically, such as that in the one in Murphys Estates, South Carolina, their average median income is unknown as the U.S. Census does not consider the Traveller ethnicity to be recognized, and may often be conflated with the Irish American category, or simply Caucasian American. However, Travellers have been covered in Dallas-area news for accidents and deaths that have occurred in their community. In Tarrant County, Texas, where a Traveller community exists, several major incidents have occurred in the 2000s. In January 2000, five Travellers boys, ages 13–14, were killed in a car accident; the pickup they were riding in flipped over a median on Interstate 30 in west Fort Worth and landed upside down on another truck. A father of a boy killed in the wreck would be sentenced to 3 years in prison for scams that occurred in California, Texas, Alaska, and other states in 2005.

In 2002, the community made national news when a Traveller woman was caught on video beating her 4-year-old daughter outside an Indiana store. The woman was said to be from the Greenhorn Traveler group that has wintered in the Fort Worth area since the 1800s.

In 2010, Pete "Blue" Daley, a 73-year-old Houston Irish Traveller also with Fort Worth ties, was fatally shot outside a motel near Atlanta, Georgia. His murder remains unsolved.

In November 2024, Irish Travellers once again were in national news, connected to an incident where former NHL player and hockey personality on the Barstool Sports podcast Spittin' Chiclets, Paul Bissonnette intervened in a drunken restaurant dispute in Scottsdale, AZ and was assaulted; the perpetrators were later connected to the Irish Traveller community.
