= Brooke Fletcher =

American sportscaster

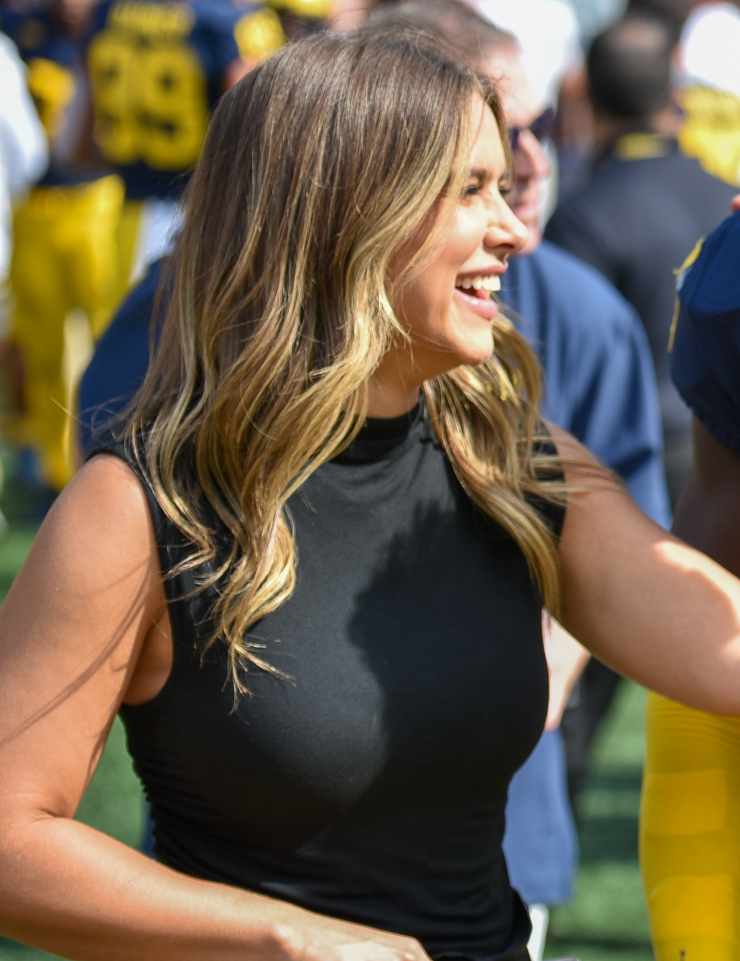
- Fletcher at Michigan Stadium in 2023
- Born: May 16, 1992 (33 years old); Milwaukee, Wisconsin, U.S.
- Education: Auburn University
- Occupation: Sportscaster
- Beauty pageant titleholder
- Title: Miss Georgia Teen USA 2009; Miss Georgia USA 2015
- Major competitions: Miss Teen USA 2009; Miss USA 2015

Brooke Fletcher (born May 16, 1992) is an on-air talent for Chicago Sports Network, and the Big Ten Network. She co-hosts the Bally Sports show The Rally and previously covered the Detroit Tigers, Detroit Red Wings, and Detroit Pistons for Bally Sports Detroit. Her father is Scott Fletcher, who played 15 seasons in Major League Baseball and has been a minor league instructor for the Tigers. Her brother-in-law is Gordon Beckham, who played for the Tigers in the 2019 season. She married Padres infielder Jake Cronenworth on January 18, 2025.

== Early life and college ==
Fletcher was born in Milwaukee, Wisconsin while her dad was playing for the Milwaukee Brewers. Her family moved to Georgia when she was two. She graduated from Starr's Mill High School in 2010, and went to Auburn University. She majored in business marketing and minored in Spanish, was in a sorority, Phi Mu and was involved in Auburn’s television station, Eagle Eye TV.

== Career ==
=== Pageantry ===
She was Miss Georgia USA in 2015 and Miss Georgia Teen USA in 2009, and first runner-up for Miss Teen USA 2009. In Miss USA 2015, Fletcher competed against fellow future sportscaster Katie George of Kentucky.

=== Sports reporting ===
Fletcher started her career with the USPBL in Michigan as a sideline reporter. These ESPN broadcasts were produced by Go Live Sports Cast for ESPN then covered college sports on ESPNU and the SEC Network. In 2018, she joined Bally Sports Detroit as a host and reporter on Tigers, Red Wings, and Pistons broadcasts. She left Bally Sports Detroit in 2022 to co-host The Rally on Bally Sports. She also joined Apple TV+ for its coverage of the Major League Baseball games and the Big Ten Network for their college football coverage in 2022. In 2025, Fletcher joined Chicago Sports Network to cover the Chicago White Sox, one of the teams her father Scott Fletcher played for.

Fletcher became the first woman in White Sox history to work a full game as a color analyst for the broadcast June 23, 2026 for the White Sox playing the Cleveland Guardians.

== Personal Life ==
Fletcher is married to Major League Baseball player Jake Cronenworth.

Awards and achievements
Preceded by Shannon Geraghty	Miss Georgia Teen USA; 2009	Succeeded by Caroline Wade
Preceded by (South Carolina) Brittany Pjetraj	Miss Teen USA 1st runner-up 2009	Succeeded by (Illinois) Lexi Atkins
Preceded by Tiana Griggs	Miss Georgia USA; 2015	Succeeded by Emanii Davis
