= Charles Hammond House =

Historic house in South Carolina, United States

- U.S. National Register of Historic Places
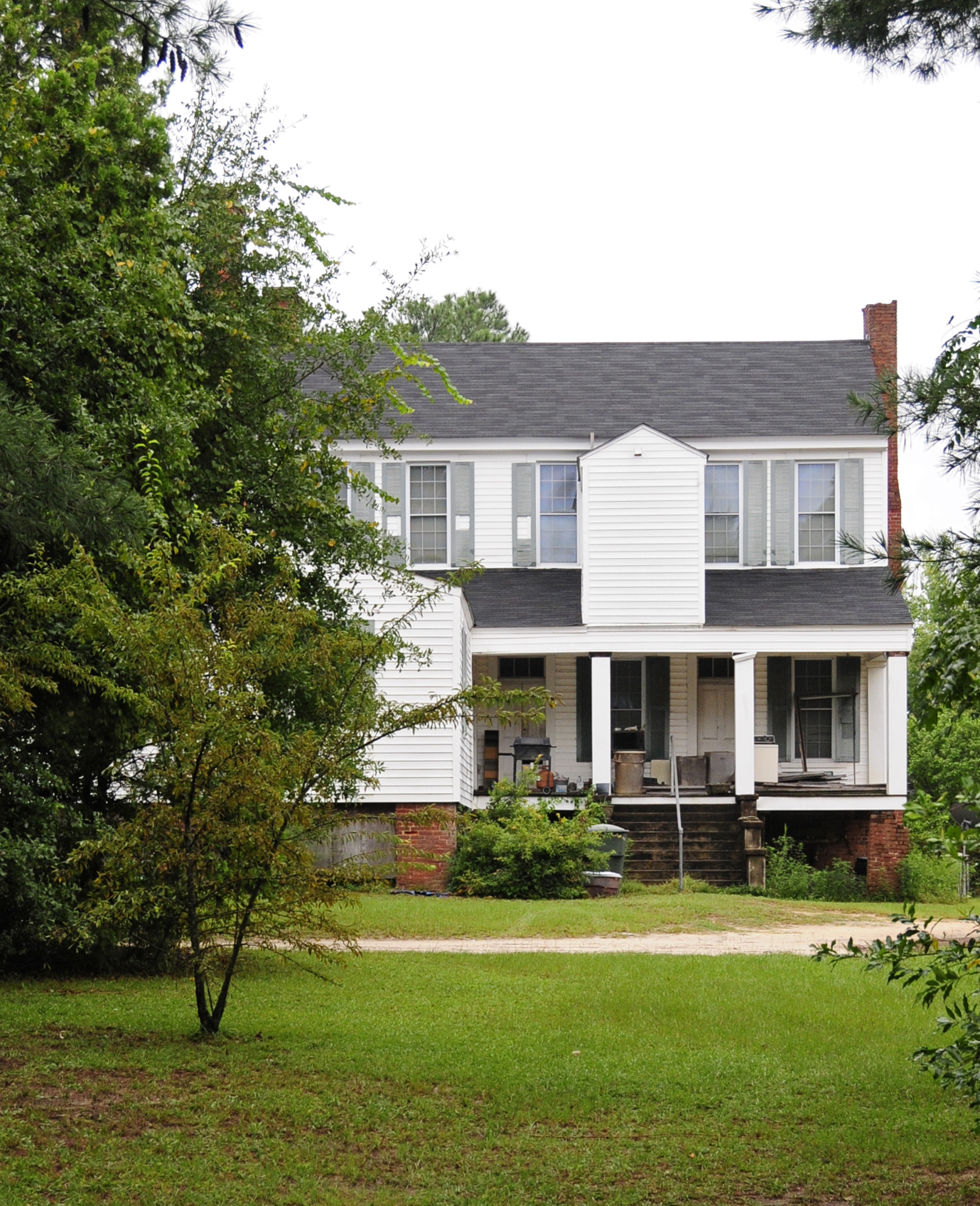
- Charles Hammond House

- Location within South Carolina Location within the United States
- Location: 908 Martintown Road W., North Augusta, South Carolina
- Coordinates: 33°31′33″N 81°58′47″W
- Area: 1.8 acres (0.73 ha)
- Built: 1775; 251 years ago 1830; 196 years ago (additions)
- Architectural style: Converting Plain
- NRHP reference No.: 73001672
- Added to NRHP: October 2, 1973

The Charles Hammond House, located at 908 Martintown Road, North Augusta, South Carolina, was built on a bluff overlooking the Savannah River between other Hammond plantations, New Richmond and Snow Hill. The Charles Hammond House was added to the National Register of Historic Places on October 2, 1973.

== History ==
Dating from the Revolutionary War era, the columned Greek Revival home is thought to be the oldest residence in North Augusta, South Carolina. The home was built for Charles and Elizabeth Steele Hammond, prosperous planters who came to South Carolina from Farnham Parish, Richmond County, Virginia in the 1770s. Martin Hammond, the progenitor of the Hammond family in South Carolina, arrived in Virginia from London prior to 1636.

The Hammonds were Patriots, and Charles and his sons served in the Revolutionary War. Also on the property is a granite monument in the shape of a pyramid which commemorates several of the Hammond family members who were Revolutionary War heroes.

== Design ==
The Charles Hammond House exemplifies a typical architectural trend of nineteenth century South Carolina that turned plain eighteenth century houses into fashionable, columned Greek Revival influenced houses. The house was originally a two-story pine clapboard structure existing from ca. 1775–1780. Also, on the property was a cellar as well as out-buildings including a kitchen and smokehouse.

Additions to the home in 1830 included front and side porches, an extension of the back porch, and a rear wing, producing an L-shape appearance. The house has a pipe stem chimney, unusual for the area. Of the three porches, those on the east and south are both two-story with four square paneled columns. The wench and pulley that was used to haul the heavy wooden beams and planks up for the second floor is still in the roof of the porch today.

Also in 1830, an English gardener landscaped a formal garden for the front and side yards. A brick path was created, magnolia trees were planted, and the cedar lined entrance drive was created.

Also on the property is a guest house and barn. A family cemetery is located adjacent to the home.
