= Stormi Henley =

Beauty pageant winner (born 1990)

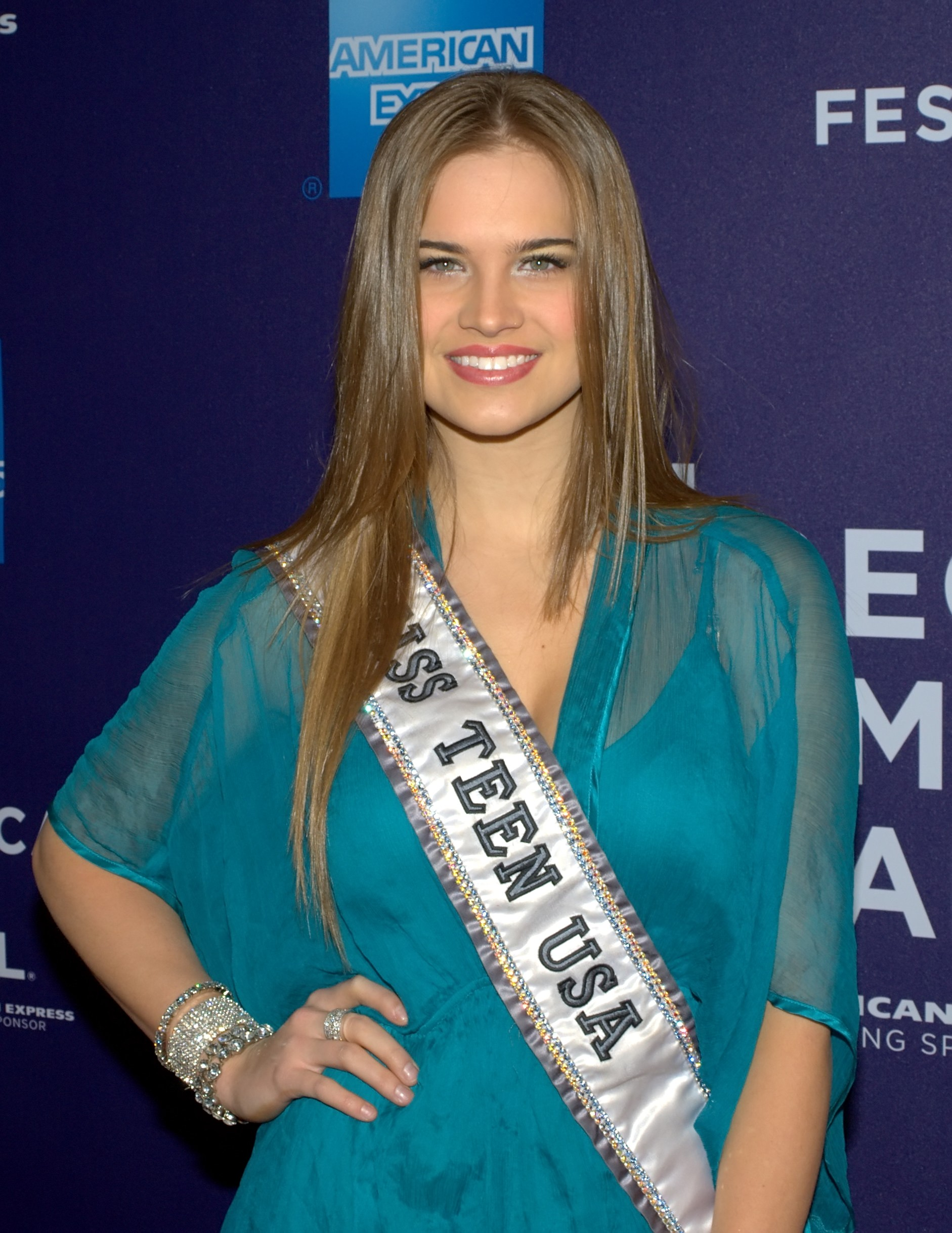
- Henley at the 2010 Tribeca Film Festival
- Born: Stormi Bree Henley; December 6, 1990 (age 35); Crossville, Tennessee, U.S.
- Other name: Stormi Bree
- Occupations: Singer; actress; model
- Partner: Lucky Blue Smith (2015–2018)
- Children: 1
- Beauty pageant titleholder
- Title: Miss Tennessee Teen USA (2009); Miss Teen USA 2009
- Hair color: Brown
- Eye color: Blue

Stormi Bree Henley (born December 6, 1990) is an American actress, singer and beauty queen. In 2008 she was crowned Miss Tennessee Teen USA, then became Miss Teen USA 2009.

== Early and personal life ==
Henley grew up in Crossville, Tennessee. She has one sister. Their father was a professional golfer, and the family would often road trip from city to city for tournaments. She is a 2009 graduate of Cumberland County High School where she participated in soccer, golf, and theatre. Prior to modelling, she had planned to become an occupational therapist.

In July 2017, Henley gave birth to a daughter. The child's father is model Lucky Blue Smith.

She briefly dated singer Joe Jonas in 2024.

== Career ==
=== Miss Teen USA ===
Henley won the Miss Tennessee Teen USA 2009 title on October 5, 2008, after competing in the pageant for the first time.

In July 2009, Henley represented Tennessee in the Miss Teen USA 2009 pageant held in Atlantis Paradise Island, Nassau, Bahamas. On July 31, 2009, Henley was crowned Miss Teen USA 2009, becoming the second teen from Tennessee to win Miss Teen USA. During her reign Henley made appearances on behalf of the Miss Universe Organization.

=== Music ===
Henley auditioned for season 10 of American Idol, where she appeared in one episode and was eliminated in the first round of Hollywood week.

In 2012 Henley joined the music group called U.G.L.Y. (abbreviating 'Underneath Greatness Lies You'), which was signed to Chris Brown's recording label, CBE. She had planned to be signed under him as a country artist before getting offered to replace Teyana Taylor when the latter left the group.

=== Acting ===
Between 2015 and 2021, Henley appeared in seven minor roles across various short films, music videos, direct-to-video films, and the "Boyle's Hunch" (2015) episode of Brooklyn Nine-Nine.

Awards and achievements
Preceded by (Arkansas) Stevi Perry	Miss Teen USA; 2009	Succeeded by (Maryland) Kamie Crawford
Preceded by Natalie Phillips	Miss Tennessee Teen USA; 2009	Succeeded by Kristen Rose
