= Murphys Estates, South Carolina =

CDP in Edgefield County

- Census-designated place
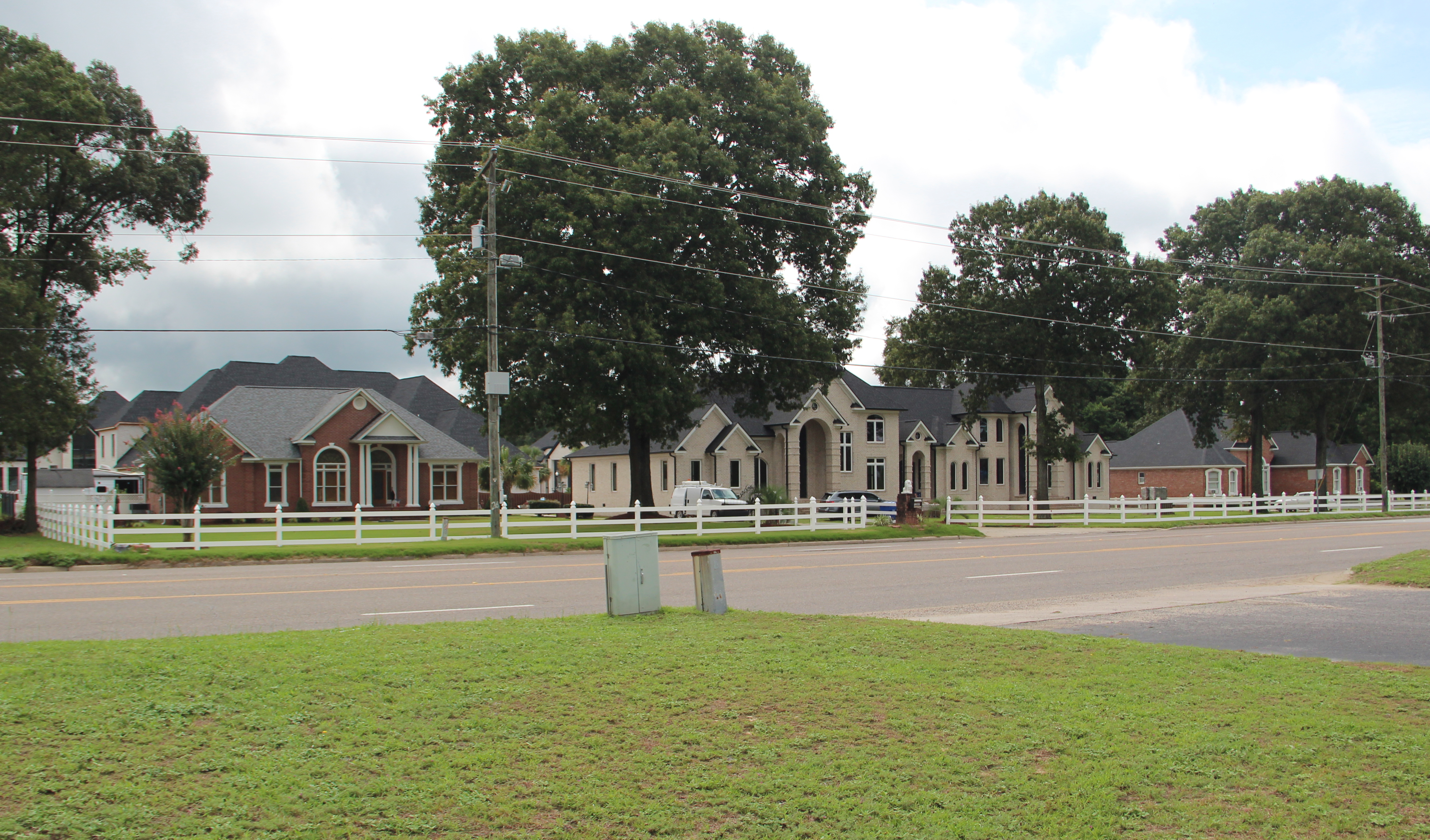
- U.S. Route 25 in Murphys Estates

- Location of Murphys Estates in Edgefield County, South Carolina

- Location in South Carolina Location in the United States
- Coordinates: 33°35′41″N 81°56′28″W
- Country: United States
- State: South Carolina
- County: Edgefield

Area
  - Total: 2.05 sq mi (5.32 km^{2})
  - Land: 2.05 sq mi (5.31 km^{2})
  - Water: 0.0039 sq mi (0.01 km^{2})
- Elevation: 571 ft (174 m)

Population (2020)
  - Total: 1,719
  - Density: 837.8/sq mi (323.48/km^{2})
- Time zone: UTC-5 (Eastern (EST))
  - Summer (DST): UTC-4 (EDT)
- ZIP code: 29860
- Area code: 803
- FIPS code: 45-48900
- GNIS feature ID: 1852679

Murphys Estates (also commonly known as Murphy Village (Note: Murphys Estates is the name recognized by the US Census Bureau)) is a census-designated place (CDP) in Edgefield County, South Carolina, part of the larger Augusta metropolitan area. The population was 1,719 as of the 2020 census. The community is notable for having the largest number of Irish Traveller Americans in the United States.

== Geography ==
Murphys Estates is located along the southern border of Edgefield County at 33°35′41″N 81°56′28″W (33.594591, -81.940999). U.S. Route 25 passes through the community, leading south 8 miles (13 km) into North Augusta and north 17 miles (27 km) to Edgefield, the county seat. The community is 2 miles (3 km) north of Interstate 20 from Exit 5, labeled as the Edgefield/Johnston exit.

According to the United States Census Bureau, the CDP has a total area of 2.1 square miles (5.4 km^{2}), all land.

== Culture ==
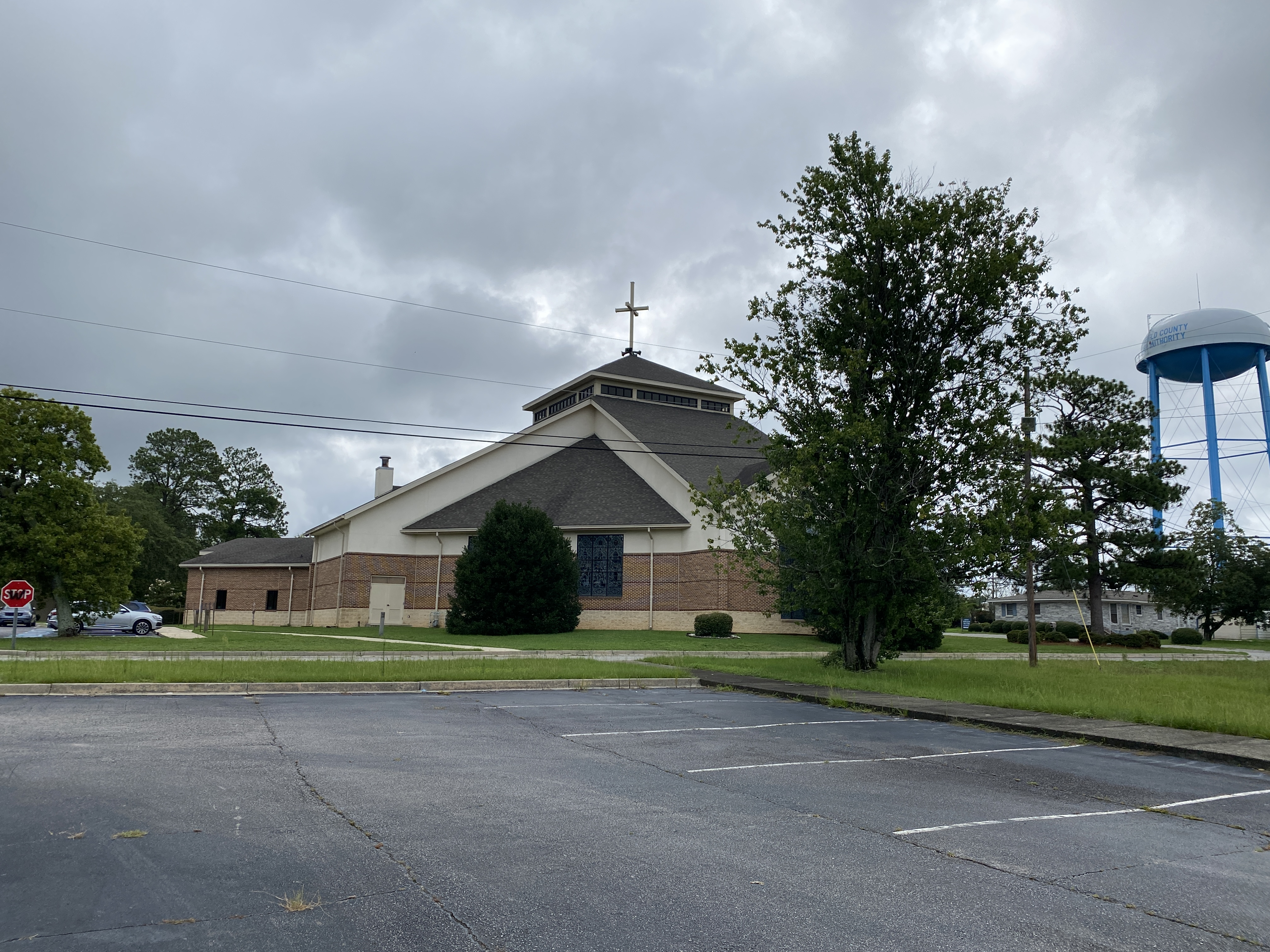
St. Edward Catholic Church

=== Irish Traveller community ===
Having emigrated from Ireland to various parts of the United States, a large number of Catholic Travellers began to congregate at the Parish of Our Lady of Peace in North Augusta after its construction in 1948. The church's Irish priest, Rev. Fr. Joseph John Murphy, encouraged the Travellers to settle to the north of North Augusta, and so the community of Murphy Village was formed during the 1960s and 1970s. St. Edward Catholic Church was constructed in Murphy Village in 1964 to serve the Travellers.

In the 2020 census, 7.1% of the population of Murphys Estates listed their ancestry as 'Irish', the largest ancestry group reported in the CDP; however, the total number of Travellers has been estimated at 1,500. Due to cultural differences, relations between the community and non-Travellers are sometimes tense; the group has been stereotyped by "outsiders" as being involved in criminal activity, forced marriages, and child abuse.

== Demographics ==
Historical population
Census	Pop.	Note	%±
2000	1,518		—
2010	1,441		−5.1%
2020	1,719		19.3%
U.S. Decennial Census

=== 2020 census ===
Murphys Estates racial composition
Race	Num.	Perc.
White (non-Hispanic)	1,350	78.53%
Black or African American (non-Hispanic)	183	10.65%
Native American	6	0.35%
Asian	12	0.7%
Other/Mixed	92	5.35%
Hispanic or Latino	76	4.42%

As of the 2020 United States census, there were 1,719 people, 461 households, and 355 families residing in the CDP. English was spoken at home by 97% of the population, and Spanish by 3%.

=== 2000 census ===
As of the census of 2000, there were 1,518 people, 534 households, and 410 families residing in the CDP. The population density was 757.2 inhabitants per square mile (292.4/km^{2}). There were 595 housing units at an average density of 296.8 per square mile (114.6/km^{2}). The racial makeup of the CDP was 91.30% White, 7.64% African American, 0.33% Native American, 0.13% Asian, and 0.59% from two or more races. Hispanic or Latino of any race were 0.13% of the population.

There were 534 households, out of which 37.3% had children under the age of 18 living with them, 56.9% were married couples living together, 15.7% had a female householder with no husband present, and 23.2% were non-families. 20.8% of all households were made up of individuals, and 6.6% had someone living alone who was 65 years of age or older. The average household size was 2.84 and the average family size was 3.31.

In the CDP, the population was spread out, with 28.2% under the age of 18, 8.3% from 18 to 24, 31.7% from 25 to 44, 24.0% from 45 to 64, and 7.8% who were 65 years of age or older. The median age was 34 years. For every 100 females, there were 92.4 males. For every 100 females age 18 and over, there were 82.3 males.

The median income for a household in the CDP was $25,972, and the median income for a family was $26,528. Males had a median income of $38,750 versus $15,450 for females. The per capita income for the CDP was $11,358. About 24.7% of families and 30.6% of the population were below the poverty line, including 40.7% of those under age 18 and 35.9% of those age 65 or over.
