= Britton Mims Place =

Historic house in South Carolina, United States

- U.S. National Register of Historic Places
- Location within South Carolina Location within the United States
- Location: 229 Edgefield Rd., North Augusta, South Carolina
- Coordinates: 33°31′27″N 81°56′59″W
- Area: 43.6 acres (17.6 ha)
- Built: 1830; 196 years ago
- Architectural style: Greek Revival
- NRHP reference No.: 97000539
- Added to NRHP: June 4, 1997

The Britton Mims Place, located in North Augusta, South Carolina, exemplifies the Greek Revival style typical of secondary country residences during the antebellum period. Built around 1830, it is historically significant due to a number of architectural features, including its gabled roof, full-width front verandah with hipped roof, and a number of outbuildings, including a (former) kitchen, wooden dog house, and a rectangular fowl house. This well-secluded home is not visible from the public highway. The Britton Mims Place was listed in the National Register of Historic Places on June 4, 1997.
