= Miss Arkansas Teen USA =

American beauty pageant competition

- Formation: 1983
- Type: Beauty pageant
- Headquarters: Shawnee
- Location: Kansas
- Members: Miss Teen USA
- Official language: English
- Key people: John M. Vannatta; Jason Vannatta; Jennifer Vannatta-Fisher, State Pageant Director
- Website: Official Website

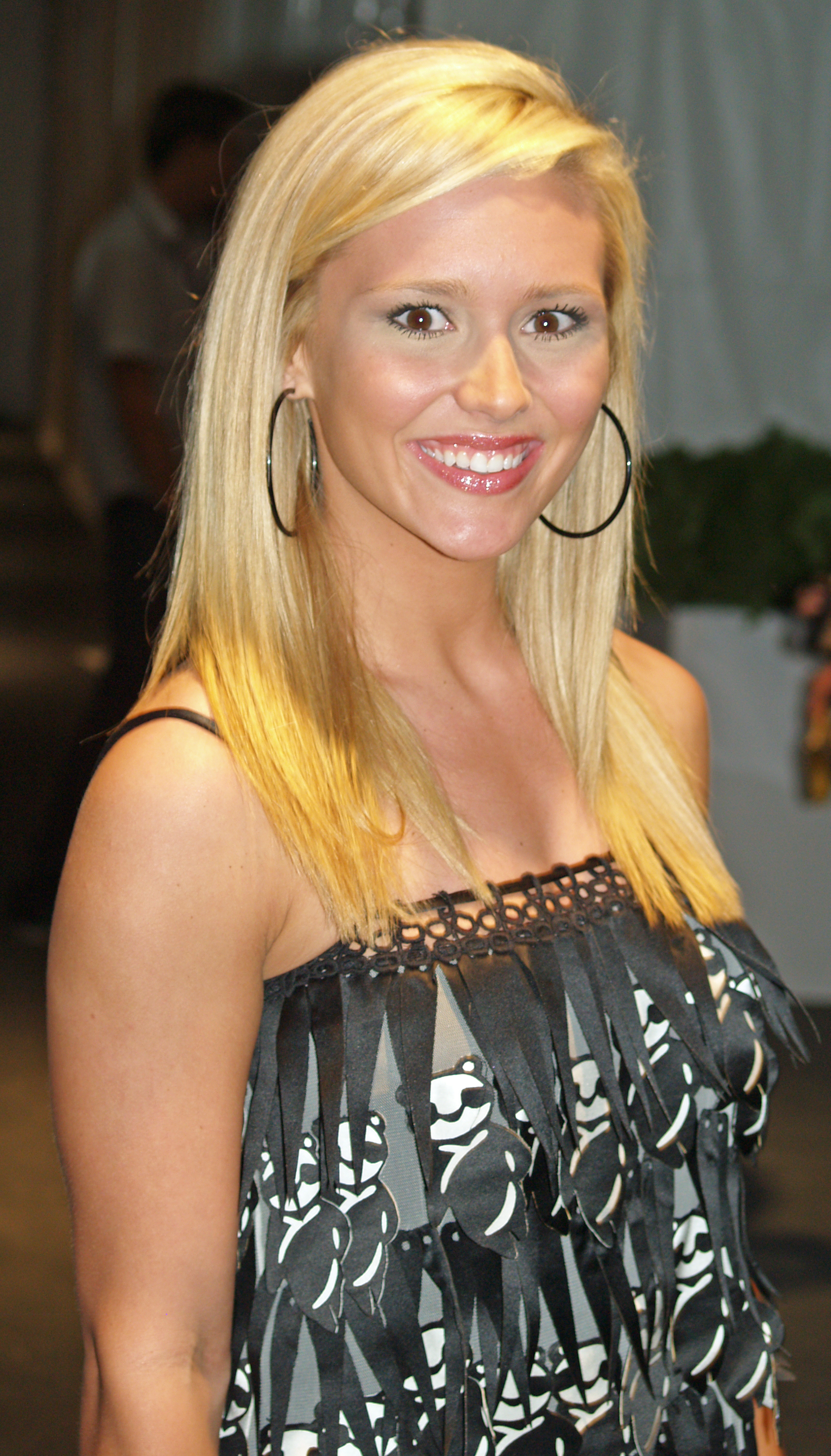
Stevi Perry, Miss Arkansas Teen USA 2008 and Miss Teen USA 2008

The Miss Arkansas Teen USA competition is the pageant that selects the representative for the state of Arkansas in the Miss Teen USA pageant.

The state pageant was directed by Premier Pageants from 2002 to 2007 before becoming part of the Vanbros organization, headquartered in Lenexa, Kansas. In 2007, Vanbros group took over the management of the pageant with the Kansas, Nebraska, Missouri and Oklahoma pageants.

From 1986 until 2004, when Sarah French won Miss Photogenic, no Miss Arkansas Teen USA had placed or won an award at the national competition. From 2008 until 2010, Arkansas had placed at Miss Teen USA three consecutive years, including Stevi Perry winning their first Miss Teen USA title in 2008.

Eight Miss Arkansas Teen USA titleholders have gone on to win the Miss Arkansas USA title and three have won Miss America state titles, more than any other state.

The current Miss Arkansas Teen USA is Raquel Olea of Maysville who was crowned on May 3, 2026, at The Center for the Arts in Russellville. She will represent Arkansas at Miss Teen USA 2026.

== Results summary ==
=== Placements ===
- Miss Teen USA: Stevi Perry (2008)
- 1st runners-up: Raquel Olea (2026)
- Top 10: Angela Boyd (1983), Rhonda Heird (1985), Siyona Karkera (2024)
- Top 15/16: Allison Kusenberger (2009), Megan Burgess (2010), Abby Floyd (2013), Arynn Johnson (2015), Maggie Williams (2019), Anna Claire Hay (2020)
- Top 20: Jewelia Reece (2025)

Arkansas holds a record of 12 placements at Miss Teen USA.

=== Awards ===
- Miss Congeniality: Angela Boyd (1983), Dana Mooney (1986)
- Miss Photogenic: Sarah French (2004)

== Winners ==
- Declared as Winner
- Ended as runner-up
- Ended as one of the finalists or semifinalists

Year	Name	Hometown	Age^{1}	Local title	Placement at Miss Teen USA	Special awards at Miss Teen USA	Notes
2026	Raquel Olea	Maysville	18	Miss Washington County Teen	1st runner-up		
2025	Jewelia Reece	Lowell	17	Miss White River Teen	Top 20		
2024	Siyona Karkera	Little Rock	19	Miss Pulaski County Teen	Top 10		
2023	Mackenzie Scott	Fayetteville	19	Miss Fayetteville Teen			
2022	Allie Shanks	White River	16	Miss White River Teen			
2021	Madeline Bohlman	Fayetteville	19	Miss Northwest Arkansas Teen			Eligible as a student of University of Arkansas at the time of crowning; Later Miss Arkansas USA 2024
2020	Anna Claire Hay	Little Rock	15	Miss White River Teen	Top 16		Later Miss Arkansas USA 2026; Later Miss International 2023
2019	Maggie Williams	Piggott	17	Miss White River Teen	Top 15		
2018	Mackenzie Elizabeth Hinderberger	Fayetteville	18	Miss Windsor Lake Teen			Later Miss Arkansas USA 2023; Top 20 at Miss USA 2023
2017	Allison Tucker	Clarksville	16	Miss Johnson County Teen			
2016	Makenzie Sexton	Cabot	16	Miss Cabot Teen			Daughter of Tonya Snodgrass, Miss Missouri USA 1992
2015	Arynn Nicole Johnson	Hot Springs	18	Miss Diamond State Teen	Top 15		Later Miss Arkansas USA 2017
2014	Lauren Ashton Weaver	Greenwood	17	Miss Greenwood Teen			Later Miss Arkansas USA 2018
2013	Abby Elizabeth Floyd	Searcy	17	Miss Searcy Teen	Top 16		Later Miss Arkansas USA 2016; Top 10 at Miss USA 2016
2012	Amber Mitchell	Sheridan	18	Miss Timberfest Teen			
2011	Mary-Kate Hartley	Hamburg	17	Miss Diamond State Teen			
2010	Megan Michelle Burgess	Hot Springs	18	Miss Hot Springs Teen	Top 15		
2009	Allison Kusenberger	Little Rock	18	Miss Little Rock Teen	Top 15		
2008	Stevi Lauren Perry	Hamburg	17	Miss Hamburg Teen	Miss Teen USA 2008		
2007	Tiffany Greenstreet	Melbourne	18				
2006	Taylor Wright	White Hall	18				
2005	Ashton Schmidt	Batesville	17				
2004	Sarah Sutton French	Hot Springs	18			Miss Photogenic	Later Miss Missouri 2006
2003	Brittany Celene Carpenter	Conway	18				
2002	Rachel Danielle Eggers	North Little Rock	16				
2001	Lauren Elizabeth Arnold	Arkadelphia	18				
2000	Paula Suzanne Taylor	Carlisle	18				
1999	Sarah Moody	Pollard	17				Later competed three times at Miss Arkansas
1998	Joan Leigh Lucas	Fayetteville	17				
1997	Brandi Watkins	Brinkley					Later competed four times at Miss Arkansas
1996	Aimee Delatte	Stuttgart					Later 1st runner-up to Miss Arkansas USA 2001 & 2002
1995	Natalie Fisher	Stuttgart					
1994	Rebekah Hall	Conway	17				
1993	Tiffany Brooke Parks	Cabot	17				Later Miss Arkansas USA 1996
1992	Stacy Freeman	Sheridan					Later Miss Arkansas 1997
1991	Paula Gaye Montgomery	Cabot					Later Miss Arkansas 1995; Second runner-up at Miss America 1996
1990	Karen Pugh	Sherwood	18				Later Mrs. Arkansas International 2004 as Karen Pugh-Thompson
1989	Susan Marshall	Cabot	18				
1988	Jessica Welch	Pine Bluff	17				
1987	Paige Ann Yandell	Greenwood					Later Miss Arkansas USA 1989
1986	Dana Moody	Batesville				Miss Congeniality	
1985	Rhonda Ann Heird	Pine Bluff	17		Top 10		
1984	Melissa Anne Staples	Calion					Later Miss Arkansas USA 1988
1983	Angela "Angie" Boyd	Manila	18		Top 10	Miss Congeniality	

^{1} Age at the time of the Miss Teen USA pageant
