= Lookaway Hall =

Historic house in South Carolina, United States

- U.S. National Register of Historic Places
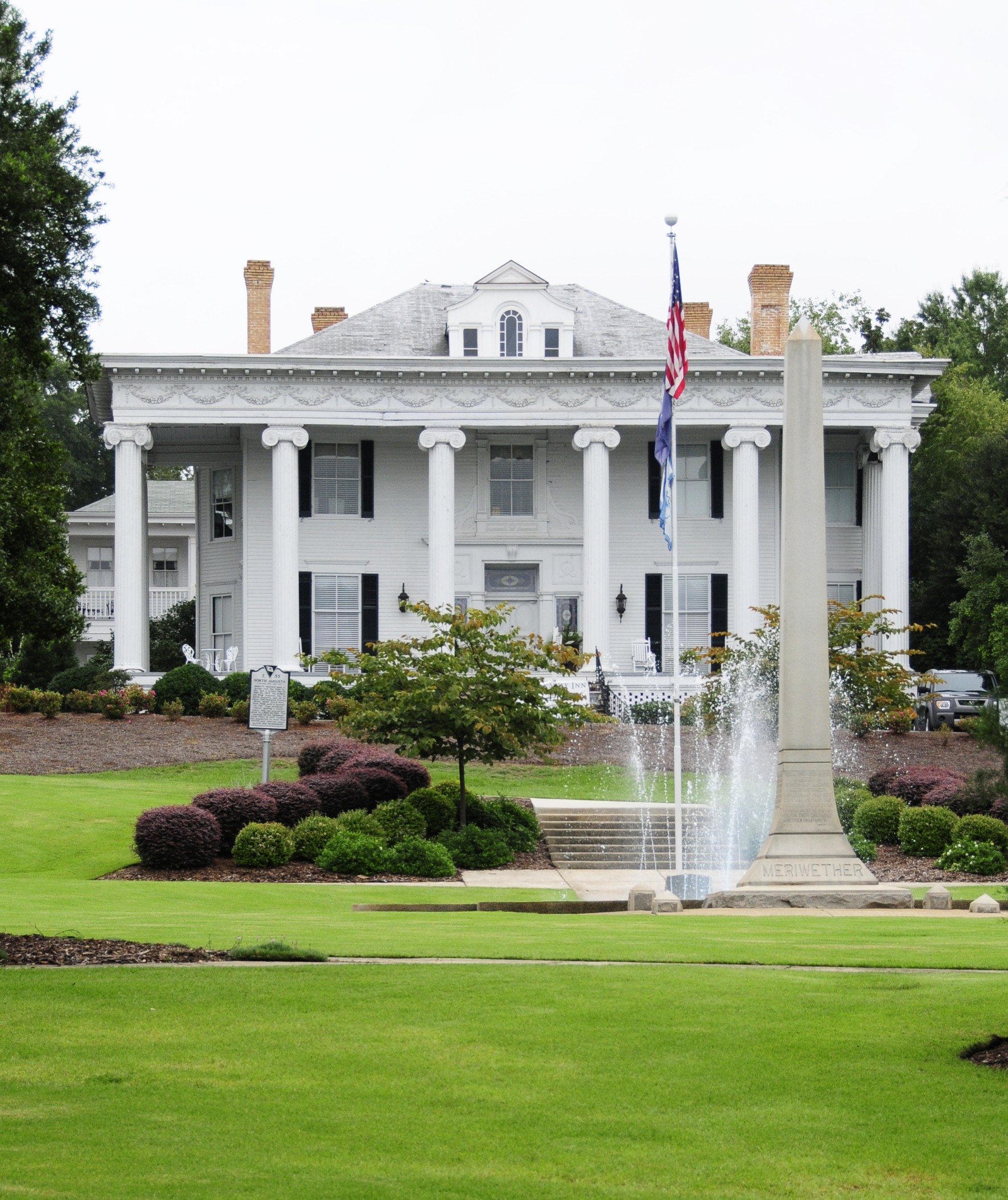

- Location within South Carolina Location within the United States
- Location: 103 W. Forest Ave., North Augusta, South Carolina
- Coordinates: 33°29′56″N 81°58′8″W
- Area: 1.5 acres (0.61 ha)
- Built: 1895–1898; 128 years ago
- Architectural style: Beaux Arts
- NRHP reference No.: 92000962
- Added to NRHP: August 13, 1992

Lookaway Hall, built from 1895 to 1898, is a North Augusta, South Carolina landmark. A number of architectural details are significant, for the home was built in the Beaux Arts and Revival styles, made popular after the World's Columbian Exposition. This accessible landmark, near the historic Georgia Avenue-Butler Avenue Historic District, was listed in the National Register of Historic Places on August 13, 1992.
