= B.C. Wall House =

Historic house in South Carolina, United States

- B. C. Wall House
- U.S. National Register of Historic Places
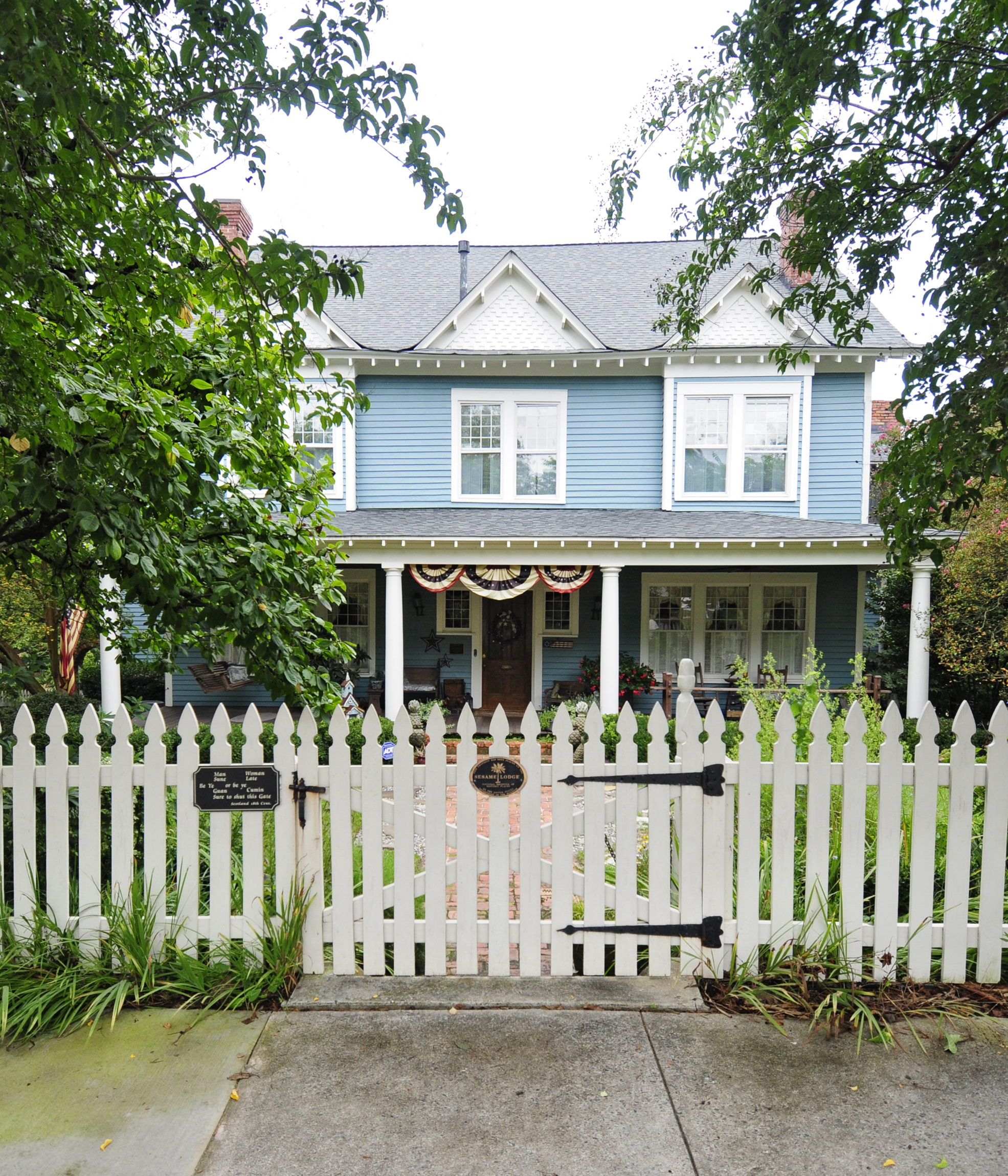

- Location within South Carolina Location within the United States
- Location: 1008 West Ave., North Augusta, South Carolina
- Coordinates: 33°30′8″N 81°58′18″W
- Area: less than one acre
- Built: 1926; 100 years ago
- Built by: Andrews, Martha Louise Wall; Wall, Budd Clay
- Architectural style: Classical Revival, Bungalow/craftsman, Queen Anne
- NRHP reference No.: 92001632
- Added to NRHP: November 27, 1992

The B.C. Wall House, also known as the Sesame Lodge, is located at North Augusta, Aiken County, South Carolina. It was constructed in 1902 by Budd Clay Wall (the mayor of North Augusta at the time) to serve as an overflow guest home from the Hampton Terrace Hotel. The home holds additional significance in that it was designed by a female architect, Wall's daughter, Martha Louise Wall Andrews. The house, which is very visible from the public street, contains elements of the Queen Anne, Classical Revival, and Bungalow Styles. It was listed on the National Register of Historic Places on November 27, 1992.
