= Lakeside School District (Hot Springs, Arkansas) =

School district in Arkansas, United States

Address
- 2837 Malvern Avenue Hot Springs, Arkansas, 71901; United States

District information
- Type: Public
- Grades: PreK–12
- NCES District ID: 0508670

Students and staff
- Students: 3,494
- Teachers: 235.93
- Staff: 155.6
- Student–teacher ratio: 14.81

Other information
- Website: lakesidesd.org

Lakeside School District 9 is a school district in Garland County, Arkansas.

It includes Lake Hamilton and a section of Hot Springs.

== Staff Qualifications ==
All professional personnel employed by the Lakeside School District must possess those qualifications set forth by the State Department of Education and/or the North Central Association of Colleges and Schools.

All instructional personnel must maintain on file, in the Superintendent's office, the following information:

1. Signed Contract
2. Arkansas Teacher Certificate
3. Social Security Number
4. T.B. Certificate
5. Statement of number of dependents
6. Official transcript of all college work
7. Current address and telephone number
8. Completed Employment Eligibility from

== Graduation Requirements (Smart Core) ==
All Lakeside High School students must successfully complete the following 24 credit requirements to be eligible for graduation

High School Graduation Requirements (Smart Core)
Subject Area'	Credits	Classes
English	4.0	English 9 English 10 English 11 English 12
Oral Communications	0.5	1 semester
Math	4.0	Algebra I Geometry Algebra II Math above Algebra II
Science	3.0	Physical Science Biology Chemistry
Social Studies	3.0	Civics/World Geography World History U.S. History
Physical Education (P.E)	0.5	1 Semester
Health & Wellness	0.5	1 Semester
Fine Arts	0.5	1 Semester
Computer Technology	0.5	1 Semester
Economics	0.5	1 Semester
Foreign Language	0.5	1 Semester
Electives	7.0	Semester or full year Class
