= Cecil L. Collins =

American politician (1926–2007)

Mayor of North Augusta, South Carolina

Member of the South Carolina House of Representatives
- In office 1972–1977

Personal details
- Born: April 21, 1926 Fort Valley, Georgia, US
- Died: September 30, 2007 (aged 81)
- Education: University of Georgia

Military service
- Allegiance: United States
- Branch/service: Commander, Naval Air Forces
- Battles/wars: World War II

Cecil L. Collins (April 21, 1926 – September 30, 2007) was an American politician. He was the former Mayor of North Augusta, South Carolina from 1967 to 1971, and a member of the South Carolina House of Representatives from 1972 to 1977.

== Biography ==
Collins was born on April 21, 1926, in Fort Valley, Georgia, and served in the Commander, Naval Air Forces during World War II. He attended the University of Georgia and graduated in 1950 with a degree in agronomy. Collins opened up the first wholesale florist in Augusta, in 1954, which is still being run by three of his sons (Georgia State Floral Distributors). His civic activities included the Optimist Club, Dixie Youth Baseball, American Legion Post 71, Grace United Methodist Church and the University of Georgia Heritage Society, as well as co-chairing the North Augusta High School Stadium fund raising committee. He was awarded the highest honor given by the state of South Carolina, the Order of the Palmetto, for his dedication and leadership to his constituents. In addition to his political and civic work, Collins permanently endowed a fund at the University of Georgia within the Department of Horticulture.
