= Skilyr Hicks =

American singer-songwriter (1998–2021)

- Born: Skilyr Leigh Hicks; 1998
- Died: December 6, 2021 (aged 23) Liberty, South Carolina, U.S
- Occupations: Singer; songwriter
- Instruments: Vocals; guitar
- Years active: 2013–2021
- Label: Stereo

Skilyr Leigh Hicks (1998 – December 6, 2021) was an American singer-songwriter. She appeared on America's Got Talent season 8 in 2013, after which she released her debut studio album Brand New Day. She died on December 6, 2021, at the age of 23.

== Career ==
Hicks learned to play the guitar in 2011. By her appearance on America's Got Talent at age 14 in 2013, she had written 20 original songs and performed in more than 100 shows. On American's Got Talent, she sang "Brand New Day", an original song she had written for her late father. The clip of her singing went viral. She was eliminated in the second round of eliminations. After the show, she released her nine-track album Brand New Day. Later that year, she appeared on the album The 12 Bands of Christmas: Vol. 10, singing "Snowflakes in the South".

On her YouTube channel, Hicks released covers of Christina Aguilera's version of the song "Say Something" and Bob Dylan's "Make You Feel My Love".

== Personal life ==
Hicks attended North Augusta High School in North Augusta, South Carolina. In April 2015, Hicks went missing after school and her mother posted on Facebook asking for the public's help. Hicks was found that same day. She went missing again in May 2021 with police asking for the public's help in trying to locate her. The police stated Hicks struggled with mental health issues at that time. She was located five days later.

Hicks had been in trouble with the law on multiple occasions. In 2017, she was arrested and jailed for assaulting three family members while drunk. She spent more than 10 days in jail for the assaults. In November 2018, she was arrested for underage drinking and then failed to appear in court on multiple occasions.

On December 6, 2021, she was found dead at a friend's house in Liberty, South Carolina, of "a possible overdose."

== Discography ==
Album	Details
Brand New Day	Tracks: 9; Released: 2013; Label: N/A; Formats: Digital download
The 12 Bands of Christmas: Vol. 10	Track: "Snowflakes in the South"; Released: 2013; Label: Stereo; Formats: CD, Digital download

== See also ==
- List of solved missing person cases (2020s)
- List of unsolved deaths
