= Abyssmal Entertainment =

Film production company

Abyssmal Entertainment, LLC
- Industry: Entertainment
- Founded: 2002; 24 years ago
- Founders: Steven Shea
- Headquarters: Chatsworth, Los Angeles, California, United States
- Products: Motion pictures
- Website: https://www.abyssmal.com/

Abyssmal Entertainment is multi-media company founded in 2002 by Steven Shea that is based in Los Angeles, CA.

The company uses a multi stream approach to content creation. They have created short and feature films, music videos, web series comics and more. They operate a 1,300 sq. ft. multi-use production stage in the San Fernando Valley.

The company started in Orlando, FL and relocated to Los Angeles in 2015. Most of the narrative works of the company are focused on indie low budget horror.

Isla Monstro in 2026 will be its widest national release.

== Narrative works ==
=== Isla Monstro ===
Isla Monstro their first animated feature film released on June 30 2026.

Isla Monstro is part of a group of films birthed from the pandemic where many industry creatives were kept at home. Director Steven Shea talking to The Hollywood Reporter “This was a project born out of the pandemic. Knowing that I'd be stuck in lockdown, I tried to figure out ways to produce content without anyone leaving their homes. Animation was the key. So I took online tutorials, taught myself animation and started to create this film with friends."

=== Sharkbaby ===
Sharkbaby, an animated short starring Dia Frampton and Dana Snyder, released in 2021 recently was shown at the Spike & Mike's Animation Extravaganza in October 2025.

Alan Ng of FilmThreat called Sharkbaby something "weird enough to start your day on"

=== Surviving Supercon ===
Surviving Supercon was a documentary about the 2018 Florida Supercon that debuted at the Florida Film Festival in 2020.

The move received solid reviews for its depiction of what it is like to run a massive fan based convention. Getting 9 of 10 from Conner's Critiques.

Alan Ng gave it 8.5/10 saying you see "all the glorious and gruesome details beautifully" of running a fan convention.

=== List of narrative works ===
2026
#	Title	Cast(s)	Genre	Director	Date released
1	Isla Monstro	James Schrader, Dana Snyder, Juliana Harkavy, John DiMaggio, James Marsters, Barry Bostwick, Christopher Sabat, Spencer Grammer	Animated Film	Steven Shea	2026

2021
#	Title	Cast(s)	Genre	Director	Date released
1	Sharkbaby	Dia Framton, Dana Snyder	Animated Short	Steven Shea	2021

2019
#	Title	Cast(s)	Genre	Director	Date released
1	Surviving Supercon	Mike Broder, Sandy Martin, Dana Snyder, more	Documentary	Steven Shea	2019

2009
#	Title	Cast(s)	Genre	Director	Date released
1	2:22	Tara Lightfoot, Adam Lopez, Marliese Leitner	Horror Short	Steven Shea	2009

2006
#	Title	Cast(s)	Genre	Director	Date released
1	Hoodoo for Voodoo	Linnea Quigley, Tiffany Shepis	Horror	Steven Shea	2006
