= Seth Goldman =

American entertainment reporter (born 1998)

Seth Goldman, raised in East Irvington, New York, is an American entertainment reporter and producer, who is the host of NBC's "Entertainment Buzz", and appears daily on television, online and on cell phones.

== Biography ==
=== Career ===
Prior to his entertainment career, Goldman attended Syracuse University, where he graduated from the Newhouse School of Communications. He began his career as a news writer at WPIX-TV in New York City before moving to WNBC-TV, also as a news writer. In 2003, Goldman was a traffic reporter for the Metro Traffic & Weather channel. And in 2004, Goldman became one of the first hires at the newly created NBC Mobile, a cell phone TV service that is available on most of the national cell phones companies. He later became the NBC Mobile Entertainment Reporter.

In 2006, Goldman was the first entertainment reporter assigned to cover the Oscars specifically for the cell phone. Since then, he has appeared on the red carpet at other major award shows and has interviewed some of the biggest stars in the entertainment world.

"Entertainment Buzz" is seen on NBC Mobile, MSNBC.com, the NBC affiliates, the NBC O&O affiliates, iVillage, and on television, on New York Nonstop, Time Warner Cable, and Daily Connection. Seth has also delivered entertainment news on weekends on MSNBC.

=== Beauty pageants ===
He hosted the Miss Teen USA 2008 pageant, along with co-host, Miss Teen USA 2004, Shelley Hennig. He was a co-host with Miss USA 2008, Crystle Stewart at the Miss USA 2009 Preliminaries. Stewart and Goldman also hosted both the Miss Teen USA 2009 and the Miss Teen USA 2010 finals.

Goldman lives in Los Angeles.
