= Hampton Terrace Hotel =

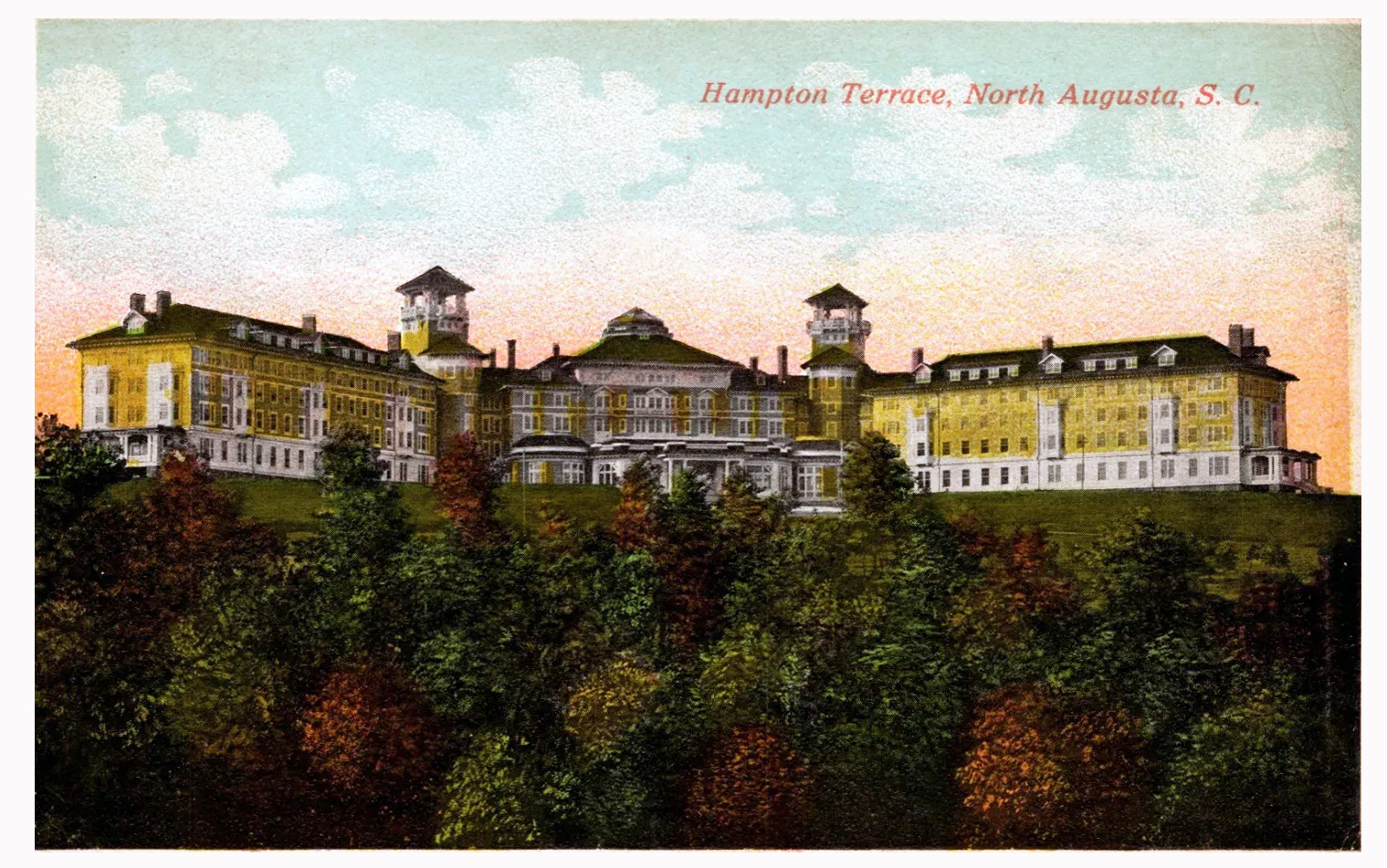
- Postcard circa 1908

- Location within South Carolina Location within the United States

General information
- Status: Destroyed
- Type: Hotel
- Location: North Augusta, South Carolina, United States
- Coordinates: 33°30′9″N 81°58′8″W
- Groundbreaking: April 1902
- Opened: December 1903
- Destroyed: December 31, 1916
- Cost: $536,000

Technical details
- Floor count: 5

Other information
- Number of rooms: 300

References
- "Emporis building ID 257693". Emporis. Archived from the original on November 8, 2020.

The Hampton Terrace Hotel was an upscale hotel in North Augusta, South Carolina, United States. The hotel was planned by James U. Jackson, the founder of North Augusta, as part of his plan to develop the city as a resort town. Opened in 1903, the hotel was later completely destroyed in a fire in 1916.

== History ==
The hotel was part of James U. Jackson's plan for developing the resort town of North Augusta, South Carolina. In April 1902, Jackson's youngest son ceremonially broke ground on the hotel, and the Woodward Lumber Company served as the general contractor's for the project. The location for the hotel was a hill overlooking the surrounding area, and it was later said that from the top floor, visitors could see sights from over 50 miles (80 km) away. The hotel was originally planned to open by January 1, 1903. That month, The Augusta Chronicle proclaimed the hotel "One of the Very Finest in the Country." The hotel opened in December 1903 and was billed in advertisements as "The Most Magnificent Winter Resort in the World." The project had cost over $500,000 and was reportedly the largest wooden structure in the world.

The five-story, 300 room hotel was a large success upon opening, attracting several notable guests such as businessmen Marshall Field, Harvey S. Firestone, John D. Rockefeller, and President-elect of the United States William Howard Taft. A banquet in Taft's honor was held at the hotel in 1909. The hotel featured a 9 (later 18) hole golf course, a 15,000 acres (6,100 ha) game preserve, and other forms of entertainment, such as shuffleboard and ping-pong. The second hole on the golf course, with a length of 593 yards (542 m), was considered one of the longest holes in the world at that time. The hotel was open between January and May every year.

In the early morning of December 31, 1916, a watchman discovered a fire on the fifth floor. At 2:10 a.m., the fire department in Augusta, Georgia, across the Savannah River, received a call about the fire, and shortly thereafter, four companies were dispatched to the hotel. By 3 a.m., the fire had spread and firefighters ordered an evacuation of the building. The cause of the fire had been a short circuit with wiring on the third floor. Witnesses at the time claim that the fire burned for about 5 hours, while the coal stored in the hotel's basement simmered for much longer. Firefighting efforts were stymied by issues such as low water pressure and nonstandard waterhose connections. At the time, the hotel housed about 100 staff members who were preparing the hotel for the upcoming season. There were no serious injuries or fatalities from the fire. The blaze completely destroyed the building, and while Jackson initially planned to rebuild the hotel, this never came to fruition.

== Bibliography ==
- Byrdy, Stan (2002). Augusta and Aiken in Golf's Golden Age. Arcadia Publishing. ISBN 978-0-7385-1485-7 – via Google Books.
- Helsley, Alexia Jones (2019). Lost Aiken County. The History Press. ISBN 978-1-4396-6626-5 – via Google Books.
- Kirby, Bill (December 29, 2019). "TIME MACHINE". The Augusta Chronicle. Gannett. Archived from the original on June 18, 2020.
- Lee III, Joseph M. (2000). Augusta in Vintage Postcards. Postcard History Series. Arcadia Publishing. ISBN 978-0-7385-5420-4 – via Google Books.
- McDaniel, Jeanne M. (2005). North Augusta: James U. Jackson's Dream. Arcadia Publishing. ISBN 978-0-7385-4172-3 – via Google Books.
