= North Augusta High School =

Coordinates: 33.5362464°N 81.9734487°W

- Logo of North Augusta High School featuring the school's mascot.

Location
- 2000 Knobcone Avenue; North Augusta, Aiken County, South Carolina 29841; United States

Information
- Type: Public high school
- Motto: Crescat Scientia, Animis Opibusque Parati (Let knowledge grow, prepared in mind and resources)
- Established: 1910; 116 years ago
- School district: Aiken County Public School District
- CEEB code: 411520
- NCES School ID: 450072000055
- Principal: Casey Rogers
- Teaching staff: 90.00 (FTE)
- Grades: 9–12
- Enrollment: 1,697 (2023–2024)
- Student to teacher ratio: 18.86
- Campus size: 50 acres (200,000 m^{2})
- Campus type: Suburban
- Colors: Black and gold
- Mascot: Yellow Jacket
- Yearbook: Sandspurs
- Website: www.acpsd.net/o/nahs

North Augusta High School is a four-year public high school located in North Augusta, South Carolina. It is a part of the Aiken County Public School District. Approximately 1,500 students attend the school. The school offers over thirty student organizations. North Augusta is an AP Magnet School and is partnered with the National Math and Science Initiative to provide various programs, resources, and help to students enrolled in AP courses at the school.

== Athletics ==
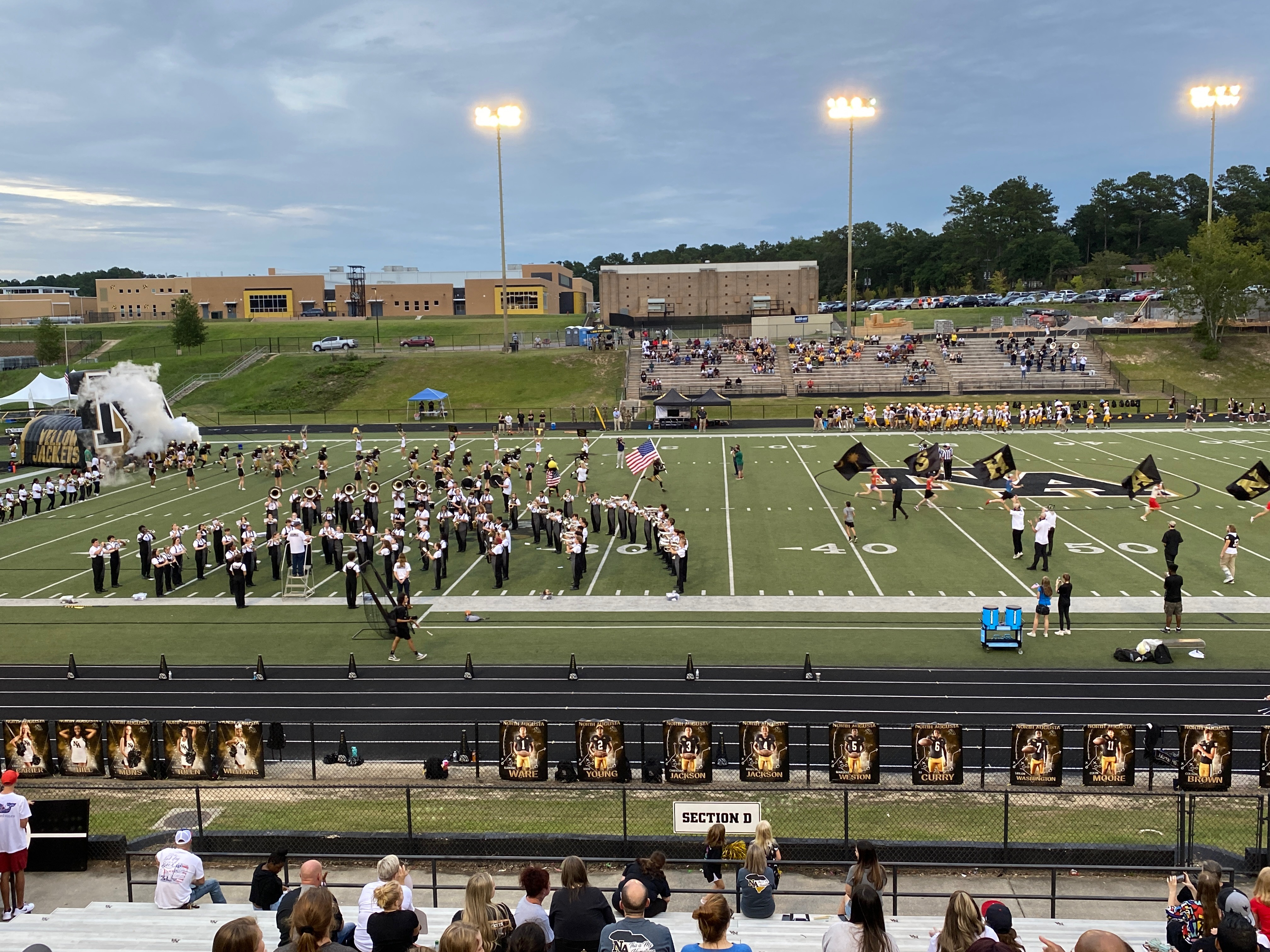
North Augusta High School entering the field for a Friday night game against Greenwood High School in 2022.

North Augusta High School's mascot is the Yellow Jacket. They compete in SCHSL Region 5-4A. The school fields over twenty-five varsity and junior varsity teams. North Augusta High is also home to sporting leagues such as football, baseball, softball, cross country, track and field, basketball, tennis, golf, wrestling, swim team, and soccer.

=== State championships ===
- Baseball: 1949, 1997
- Basketball - Girls: 2017, 2018, 2019, 2020, 2023, 2025
- Football: 1957, 1960, 1989
- Golf - Boys: 1973, 1982, 1983, 2023
- Softball: 2022
- Track - Boys: 1952
- Volleyball: 1970

== Renovation and New Construction ==
In 2014, a multi-phase renovation project began at the school to update existing facilities, which were built in the late 1960s, and to construct new buildings. In January 2015, "Phase 1" was completed when the new 45,000 square foot Math and Science building was finished. "Phase 2A" was completed in November 2015 with the completion of 125,000 square foot building containing classrooms, the "Freshman Academy", a new media center, and a dining room. "Phase 2B" added a new wing for English, Math, Foreign Language, and Social Study classrooms and was completed in October 2019. The final phase, "Phase 3" included a new "arena style" basketball gymnasium, choral/band/orchestral rooms, and a new band field and was completed in Spring 2021. Until 2026, the only pre-2014 school building that remained was the auditorium.

In 2024, ground was broken to construct the "Athletic Complex," which includes baseball and softball fields as well as an additional paved parking lot. The complex was later renamed to "Jacket Park," with construction completed in February 2026.

North Augusta High School is undergoing a new project to modernize the existing auditorium with the goal to expand the facility by increasing seating capacity, enlarging the stage and lobby areas, and creating a more open entrance. It will also improve accessibility, add updated restrooms, and support spaces (like dressing rooms, storage, and a scene shop). The budget for the new project is estimated to be around $11,000 and will be funded by 2014 1% funds. The project is active and is estimated to be completed in 2027.

== Notable alumni ==
- Matt Hazel, NFL wide receiver
- Craig Baynham, NFL halfback
- Charley Britt, NFL defensive back and actor
- Matt Campbell, NFL offensive lineman
- Tyler Colvin, Major League Baseball player
- Drew Stevens, college football placekicker
- Fred Vinson, NFL defensive back
- Charlie Waters, NFL player and coach
- Scott Brown, PGA Tour winner
- Skilyr Hicks (singer), America's Got Talent contestant
- Seph Stanek, Broadway actor and singer; appeared on Broadway and television, including frequent collaborations with Kristin Chenoweth.
