= Sarah French =

American beauty pageant contestant and journalist

- Born: Sarah French; Dallas, Texas, [U.S.]
- Height: 5 ft 6 in (1.68 m)
- Beauty pageant titleholder
- Title: Miss Arkansas Teen USA 2004; Miss Missouri 2006
- Hair color: Blonde
- Eye color: Brown
- Major competitions: Miss Teen USA 2004; Miss America 2007

Sarah French (born September 17, 1985) is a former American journalist. She worked as an anchor/reporter for WCNC 36 in Charlotte, North Carolina for eight years. After the murder of her friend and colleague Alice Morrin, French became an advocate for domestic violence victims and worked with Connecticut legislators to make 911 texting available statewide.

She was born in Dallas, Texas, but grew up in Hot Springs, Arkansas, and moved to Columbia, Missouri, to attend college.

French competed in the Miss Teen USA and Miss America pageants. She won the Miss Arkansas Teen USA 2004 title in a state pageant held in late 2003. It was her first attempt at the title. She went on to represent Arkansas in the Miss Teen USA 2004 pageant held in Palm Springs, California, in August 2004. French did not place in the nationally televised pageant, which was won by Shelley Hennig of Louisiana, but she did win the Miss Photogenic award. This award, chosen by a public internet vote, is given to the delegate who most "exemplifies beauty through the lens of a camera".

French, a 2004 graduate of Lakeside High School in Arkansas, later moved to Columbia, Missouri, to study Broadcast Journalism at the University of Missouri. While there she won the Miss Mid-Missouri title and competed for the Miss Missouri 2006 title, which she won. French is one of only a few Miss Teen USA delegates to win a Miss America state title, which is even more rare than the fact that she has held titles in different states.

French competed in the Miss America 2007 pageant broadcast live on CMT from the Theatre for the Performing Arts on January 29, 2007, and won the Miss America 2007 Smile Award. Her platform was "Health and Fitness for Life". "I chose my platform because diabetes runs on both sides of my family." She has also volunteered with the Special Olympics and has written articles for Life & Home Magazine, where she established a monthly health and fitness column.

As Miss Missouri, French worked as a spokesperson for the Susan G. Komen Foundation and Children's Miracle Network, traveling the state giving motivational speeches and speaking with young students through a program called Right Decisions, Right Now.

During college, French worked as an anchor/reporter at the NBC affiliate station, KOMU-TV, in Columbia, Missouri. She worked as a multimedia journalist, taking on the roles of photographer, reporter, and editor. During college, she also worked as an intern for NBC Universal in Burbank, California, where she assisted in the production of NBC's annual Press Tour. While in Los Angeles, French was a host for NBC's local television show YourLA.

French is a member of the Cherokee Nation. While she was Miss Missouri, she was asked to speak at the National Trail of Tears Conference.

Preceded by Brittany Carpenter	Miss Arkansas Teen USA; 2004	Succeeded by Ashton Schmidt
Preceded by Stacie Cooley	Miss Missouri; 2006	Succeeded by Lindsay Casmaer
