= Georgia Avenue-Butler Avenue Historic District =

Historic district in South Carolina, United States

- U.S. National Register of Historic Places
- U.S. Historic district
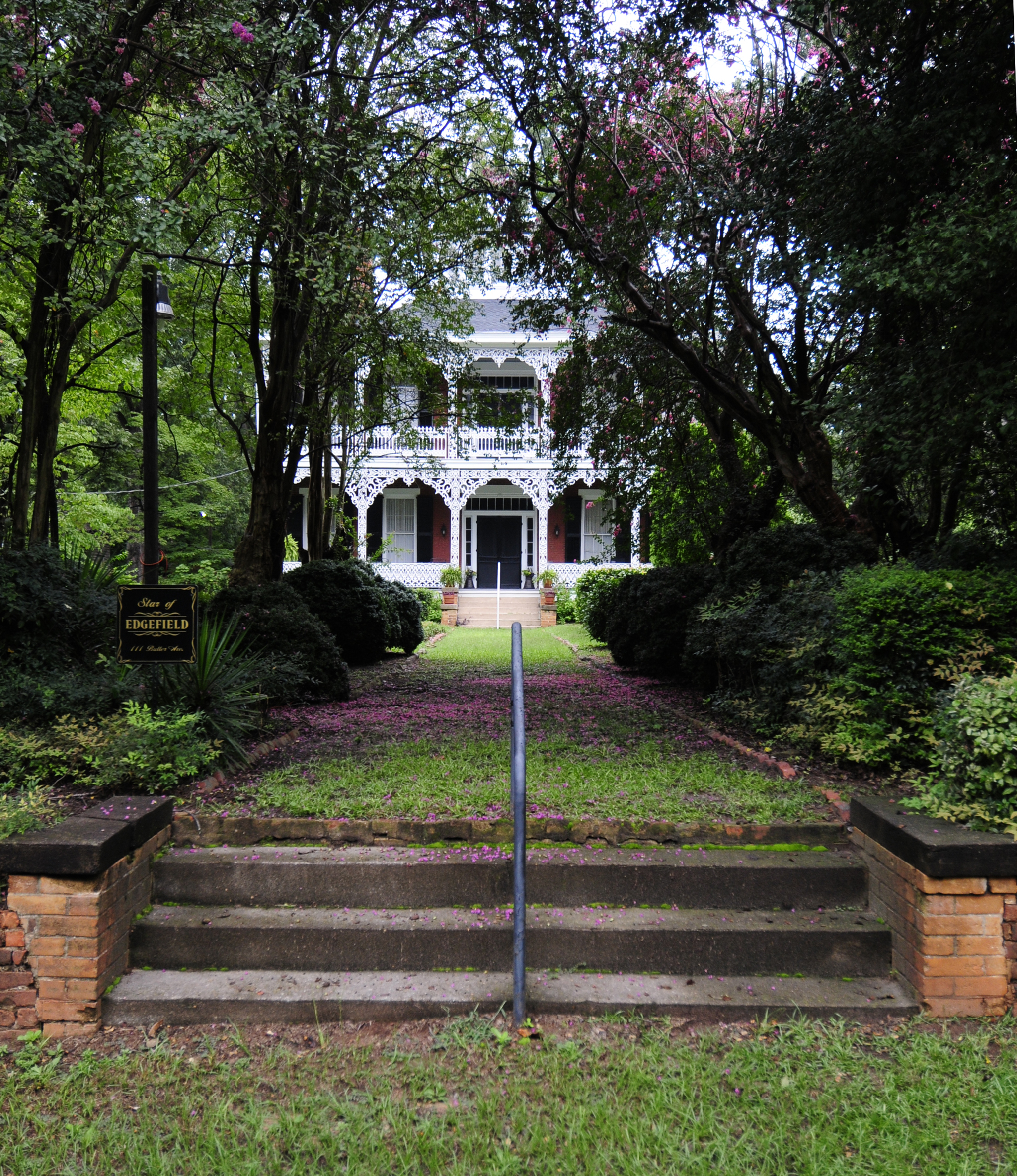

- Location within South Carolina Location within the United States
- Location: Georgia, Butler Aves. and Martintown Rd., North Augusta, South Carolina
- Area: 30 acres (12 ha)
- Built: 1930; 96 years ago
- Architectural style: Classical Revival, Late Victorian, Tudor Revival
- NRHP reference No.: 84002017
- Added to NRHP: April 5, 1984

The Georgia Avenue-Butler Avenue Historic District is located in North Augusta, South Carolina, United States. The district overlooks the city of Augusta, Georgia. The district was named to the National Register of Historic Places in 1984.

The area, though small (consisting of only sixteen total properties), is significant in terms of offering perspectives on the development of Aiken. In the district it is possible to experience Aiken's antebellum origins, its winter resort era, and finally its maturation as a year-round community. The buildings, many of which were constructed between 1900 and 1930, are protected from view by trees and shrubs, but nevertheless, the district can be enjoyed from a car.
