= Stevi Perry =

American TV host and beauty queen (born 1990)

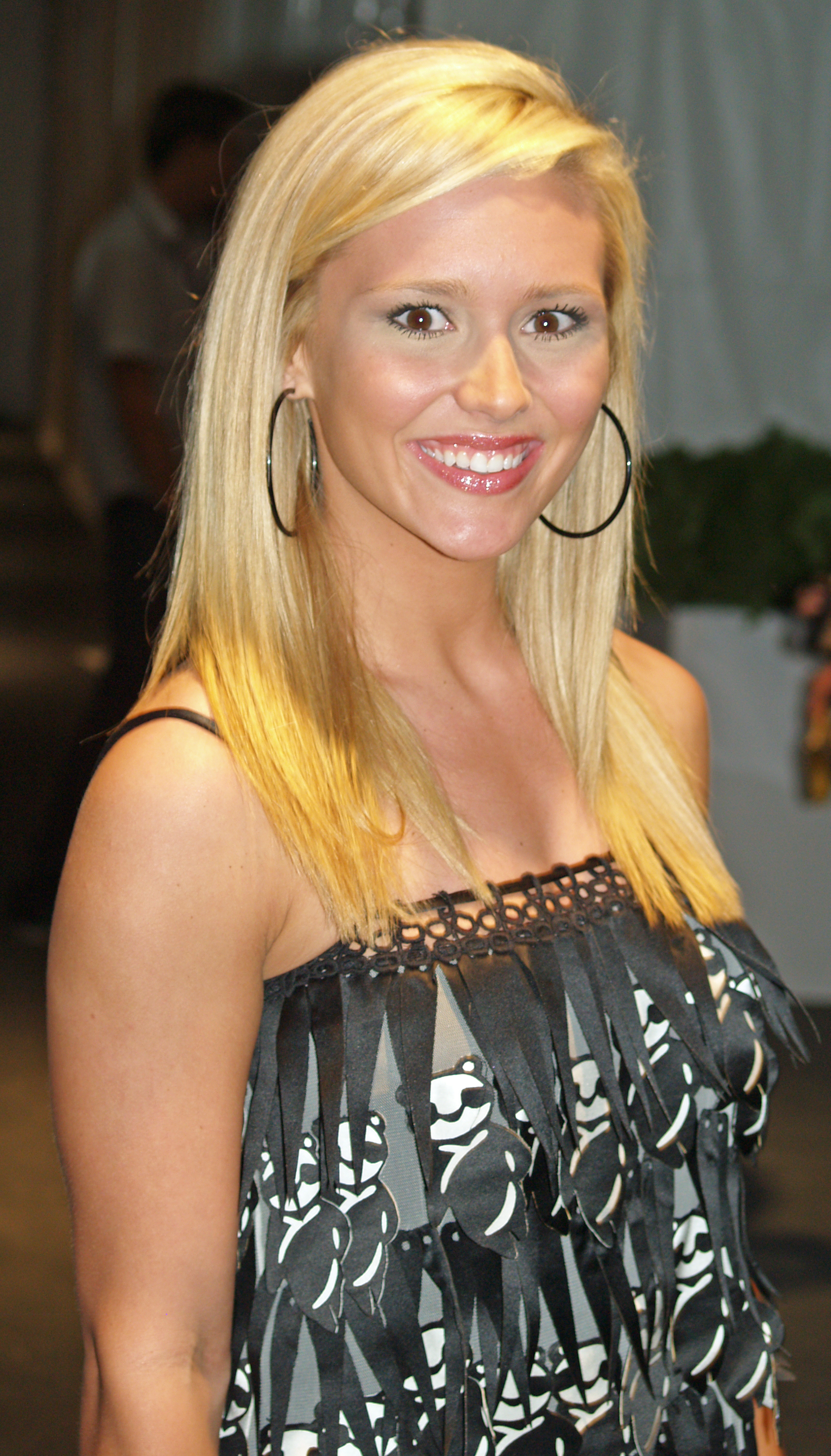
- Born: Stevi Lauren Perry; July 5, 1990 (age 36); Hamburg, Arkansas, U.S.
- Other name: Stevi Perry
- Height: 5 ft 6 in (1.68 m)
- Beauty pageant titleholder
- Title: Miss Arkansas Teen USA 2008; Miss Teen USA 2008
- Hair color: Blonde
- Eye color: Brown
- Major competition: Miss Teen USA 2008 (winner)

Stevi Lauren Perry (born July 5, 1990) is an American tv host and beauty queen who was crowned Miss Teen USA 2008.

== Miss Arkansas Teen USA 2008 ==
Perry won the Miss Arkansas Teen USA 2008 title on November 25, 2007, after competing in the pageant for the first time. Her sister was Rachel Howells, Miss Arkansas USA 2008 titleholder.

== Miss Teen USA 2008 ==
In August 2008, Perry represented Arkansas in the Miss Teen USA 2008 pageant held in Atlantis Paradise Island, Nassau, Bahamas, the first Miss Teen USA pageant held outside the United States. During the first-ever not broadcast Miss Teen USA beauty pageant on August 16, 2008, Perry was crowned Miss Teen USA 2008 by outgoing queen Hilary Cruz. She was the first teen from Arkansas to ever win Miss Teen USA. Arkansas won Miss USA 1982 when Terri Utley took the crown. Prior to Perry's win, Arkansas had gone the longest period of time without placing. The last placement was in 1985, when Rhonda Ann Heird made the top ten.

During her reign she continued to make appearances on behalf of the Miss Universe Organization alongside her sister queens Crystle Stewart, Miss USA 2008, from Texas, and Dayana Mendoza, Miss Universe 2008, from Venezuela. Perry graduated from Hamburg High School and attended The New York Film Academy.
