= Rosemary Hall (North Augusta, South Carolina) =

Historic house in South Carolina, United States

- U.S. National Register of Historic Places
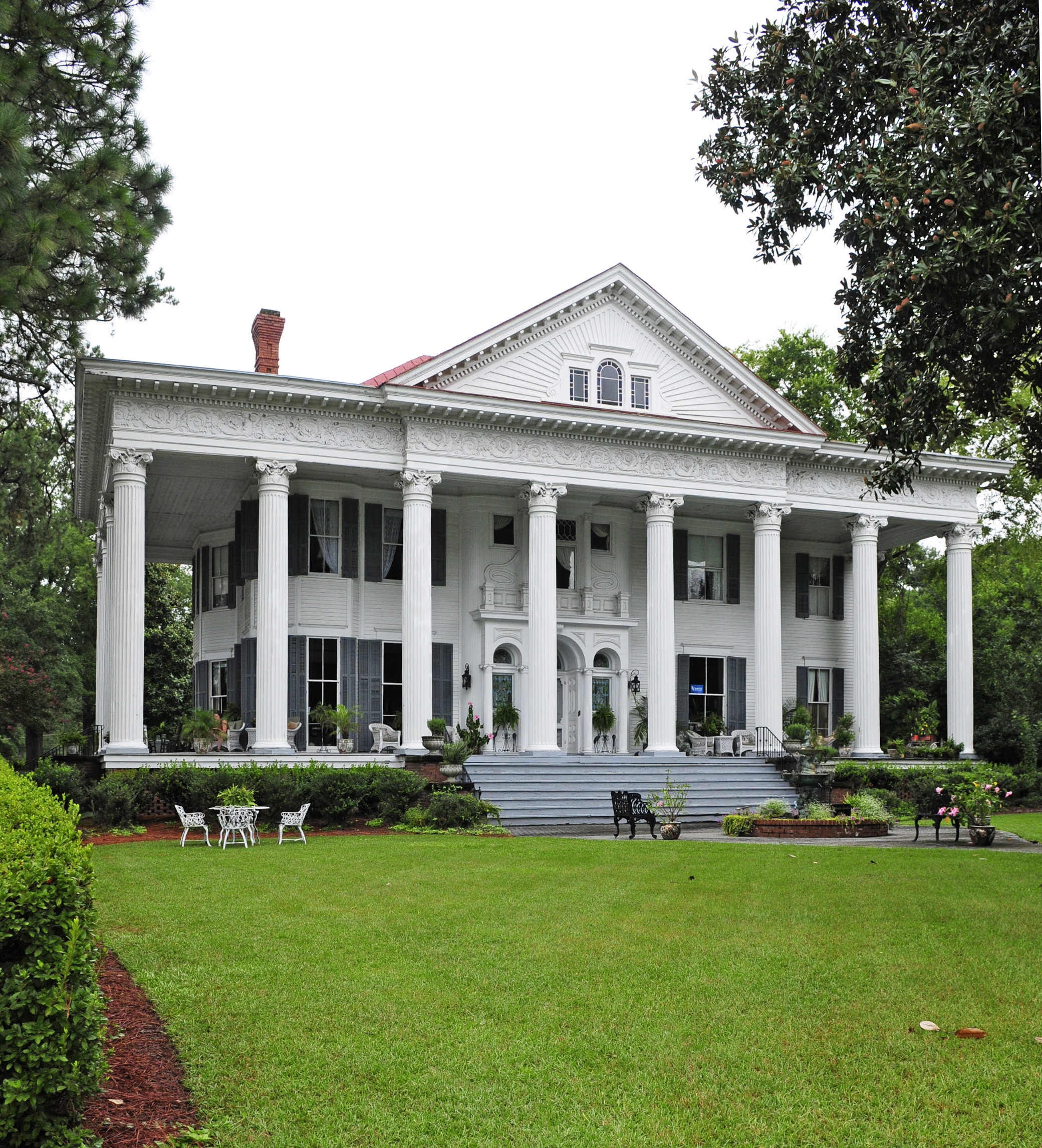

- Location within South Carolina Location within the United States
- Location: 804 Carolina Ave., North Augusta, South Carolina
- Coordinates: 33°29′49″N 81°58′12″W
- Area: less than one acre (0.40 ha)
- Built: 1900; 126 years ago
- Architectural style: Greek Revival
- NRHP reference No.: 75001685
- Added to NRHP: April 28, 1975

Rosemary Hall is a Greek Revival house in North Augusta, South Carolina that was built in 1900. It was listed on the National Register of Historic Places in 1978. Today, it serves as a boutique bed-and-breakfast.
