= North Augusta, South Carolina =

- City
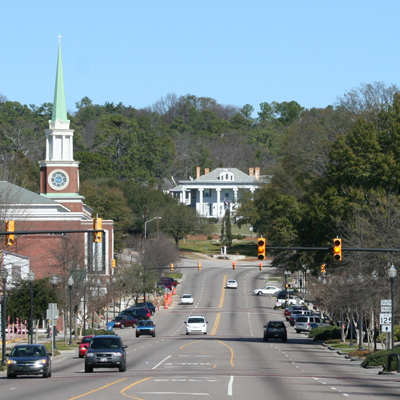
- Downtown North Augusta

- Flag Seal
- Nickname: South Carolina's Riverfront
- Interactive map of North Augusta
- Location within South Carolina Location within the United States
- Coordinates: 33°30′47″N 81°58′46″W
- Country: United States
- State: South Carolina
- Counties: Aiken, Edgefield
- Incorporated: April 11, 1906; 120 years ago
- Founder: James U. Jackson

Government
  - Type: Mayor–council
  - Mayor: Briton Williams (R)

Area
  - Total: 21.84 sq mi (56.57 km^{2})
  - Land: 21.29 sq mi (55.14 km^{2})
  - Water: 0.55 sq mi (1.43 km^{2})
- Elevation: 469 ft (143 m)

Population (2020)
  - Total: 24,379
  - Density: 1,145.1/sq mi (442.11/km^{2})
- Time zone: UTC−5 (Eastern (EST))
  - Summer (DST): UTC−4 (EDT)
- ZIP codes: 29841, 29860, & 29861
- Area codes: 803, 839
- FIPS code: 45-50695
- GNIS feature ID: 2404389
- Website: www.northaugustasc.gov

North Augusta is a city in Aiken and Edgefield counties in the U.S. state of South Carolina, on the north bank of the Savannah River. It lies directly across the river, and state border, from Augusta, Georgia. The population was 24,379 at the 2020 census, making it the 21st-most populous city in South Carolina. The city is included in the Central Savannah River Area (CSRA) and is part of the Augusta, Georgia, metropolitan area.

== History ==
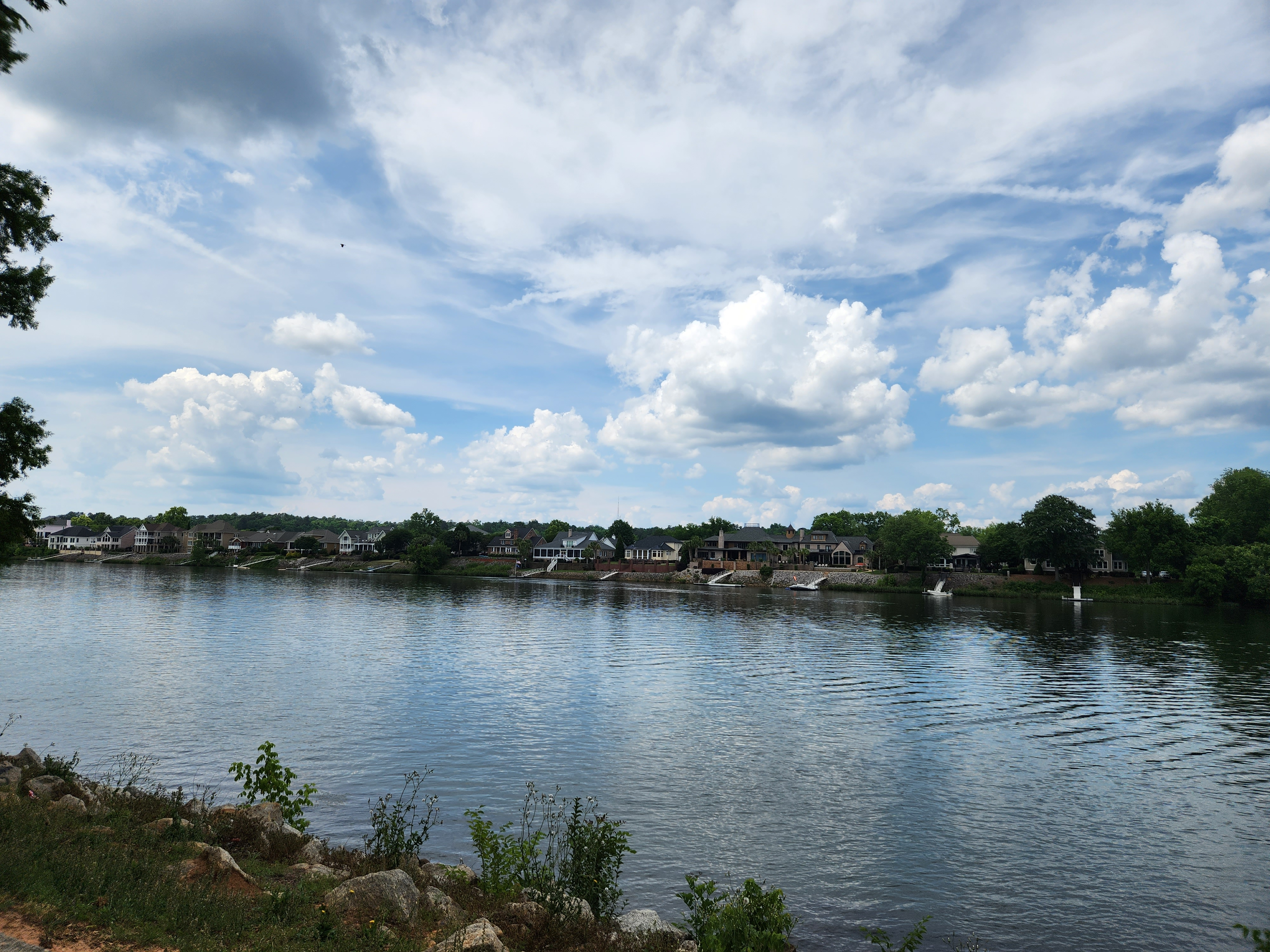
North Augusta as seen from the south bank of Savannah River

In the 1890s, James U. Jackson, the city's primary visionary, joined his brother Walter Jackson and a group of New York-based investors in founding the North Augusta Land Company. On March 24, 1890, the company purchased a 5,600 acres tract of land from Mattie Butler Mealing, who inherited the land from her father, Robert Butler. Additional parcel of lands were acquired, bringing the total to 6,500 acres. James traveled to New York several times to receive financial backing for the town and the construction of the Thirteen Street/Georgia Avenue Bridge (James U. Jackson Memorial Bridge).

The city was incorporated on April 11, 1906. Two earlier settlements preceded North Augusta: Campbelltown, founded in 1780 by John Hammond, son of Charles Hammond, and the antebellum city of Hamburg.

In the early 20th century, North Augusta was a popular vacation spot for northerners. Its popularity stemmed from its railroad connections and climate. The Hampton Terrace Hotel, a luxury resort built by the Jackson brothers and opened in 1903, contributed to North Augusta's early economic development by attracting affluent seasonal visitors until its destruction by fire on December 31, 1916.

In the mid-20th century after the atomic bomb and during the Cold War, the city's population nearly quadrupled because the Savannah River Plant was constructed south of town. During this period the area of North Augusta increased from 772 acres to 5,139 acres.

The Georgia Avenue-Butler Avenue Historic District, Charles Hammond House, Lookaway Hall (the residence of Walter Jackson), Britton Mims Place, Rosemary Hall (the residence of James U. Jackson), and B.C. Wall House are listed on the National Register of Historic Places.

North Augusta is also notable for nearby Murphy Village, a community of about 2,500 Irish Travelers that was featured on a 2012 episode of the TLC show, My Big Fat American Gypsy Wedding.

== Geography ==
North Augusta is located in western Aiken County. A small part of the city extends north into Edgefield County.

According to the United States Census Bureau, the city has a total area of 20.5 square miles (53.1 km^{2}), of which 20.0 square miles (51.9 km^{2}) is land and 0.46 square miles (1.2 km^{2}), or 2.25%, is water.

=== Highways ===
- I-20
- I-520
- US 1
- US 25
- US 25 Bus.
- US 25 Conn.
- US 78
- US 278
- SC 121
- SC 125
- SC 125 Conn.
- SC 125 Truck
- SC 126
- SC 230

== Demographics ==
Historical population
Census	Pop.	Note	%±
1910	1,136		—
1920	1,742		53.3%
1930	2,003		15.0%
1940	2,629		31.3%
1950	3,659		39.2%
1960	10,348		182.8%
1970	12,883		24.5%
1980	13,593		5.5%
1990	15,351		12.9%
2000	17,574		14.5%
2010	21,348		21.5%
2020	24,379		14.2%
2025 (est.)	26,982	▲	10.7%
U.S. Decennial Census; 2020 Census figure

=== 2020 census ===
As of the 2020 census, North Augusta had a population of 24,379. The median age was 40.3 years. 21.0% of residents were under the age of 18 and 18.7% of residents were 65 years of age or older. For every 100 females there were 90.5 males, and for every 100 females age 18 and over there were 85.9 males age 18 and over. There were 6,461 families residing in the city.

Racial composition as of the 2020 census
Race	Number	Percent
White	16,631	68.2%
Black or African American	4,842	19.9%
American Indian and Alaska Native	91	0.4%
Asian	428	1.8%
Native Hawaiian and Other Pacific Islander	25	0.1%
Some other race	715	2.9%
Two or more races	1,647	6.8%
Hispanic or Latino (of any race)	1,698	7.0%

98.5% of residents lived in urban areas, while 1.5% lived in rural areas.

There were 10,496 households in North Augusta, of which 28.1% had children under the age of 18 living in them. Of all households, 44.0% were married-couple households, 18.8% were households with a male householder and no spouse or partner present, and 31.8% were households with a female householder and no spouse or partner present. About 32.6% of all households were made up of individuals and 11.9% had someone living alone who was 65 years of age or older.

There were 11,401 housing units, of which 7.9% were vacant. The homeowner vacancy rate was 1.5% and the rental vacancy rate was 8.4%.

In 2023, of the 24,379 people, about 24,121 lived in Aiken County, and about 285 lived in Edgefield County.

=== 2010 census ===
As of the 2010 census of 2010, there were 21,348 people, 9,003 households, and 4,764 families residing in the city. The population density was 1,213 inhabitants per square mile (468/km^{2}). There were 9,726 housing units at an average density of 552.6 units per square mile (213.4 units/km^{2}). The racial makeup of the city was 74.2% White, 20.4% African American, 0.3% Native American, 1.1% Asian, 0.04% Pacific Islander, 2% from other races, and 2% from two or more ethnic groups. Hispanic or Latino of any race were 4.2% of the population.

=== 2000 census ===
In 2000, there were 7,330 households, out of which 32.5% had children under the age of 18 living with them, 48.8% were married couples living together, 13.0% had a female householder with no husband present, and 35.0% were non-families. 30.5% of all households were made up of individuals, and 10.6% had someone living alone who was 65 years of age or older. The average household size was 2.35 and the average family size was 2.96.

In the city, the population was spread out, with 25.2% under the age of 18, 8.4% from 18 to 24, 30.8% from 25 to 44, 21.3% from 45 to 64, and 14.2% who were 65 years of age or older. The median age was 36 years. For every 100 females, there were 88.5 males. For every 100 females age 18 and over, there were 84.4 males.

The median income for a household in the city was $45,600, and the median income for a family was $58,472. Males had a median income of $42,089 versus $28,790 for females. The per capita income for the city was $23,099. About 9.8% of families and 11.0% of the population were below the poverty line, including 16.6% of those under age 18 and 10.7% of those age 65 or over.

== Sports and recreation ==
=== SRP Park ===
SRP Park is a baseball park located in North Augusta along the Savannah River. It is the home of the Augusta GreenJackets, the Single-A affiliate of the Atlanta Braves.

=== Riverview Park Activities Center ===
The Riverview Park Activities Center is the host site for Nike's annual premier summer events, the Nike Peach Jam (boys) and the Nike Nationals (girls). The nation's top high school basketball prospects and college coaches gather in North Augusta each year for the tournaments.

=== The Greeneway Trail ===
Greeneway route

Established in 1995, North Augusta maintains over 9 miles (14 km) of paved trails following a former railroad line which passes through several neighborhoods within the city. It is primarily accessible from the western terminus near Edgefield County, the eastern terminus at Riverside Boulevard, its approximate midpoint near Riverview Park, and an additional trailhead located near Savannah River.

=== John C. Calhoun Park ===
John C. Calhoun Park is in North Augusta. It is where the controversial Meriwether Monument is located. It was erected to commemorate the only white person killed in the Hamburg massacre.

== Government ==
The City of North Augusta is governed under a mayor-council government form, with a city council composed of seven members. Council members are elected at large to four-year staggered terms, with elections held every two years. The mayor is also elected at large and serves a four-year term.

At the federal level, the Aiken County portion of North Augusta is part of South Carolina's 2nd congressional district while the remaining Edgefield County portion is part of the 3rd congressional district. At the state level, the city is part of the South Carolina Senate's 24th district, and the 83rd district for the South Carolina House of Representatives.

== Education ==
The portions in Aiken County are in the Aiken County Public School District. North Augusta public schools includes two high schools, North Augusta High School and Fox Creek High School. North Augusta High School is in Aiken County and operates under the Aiken County School District. Three middle schools, North Augusta Middle School, Paul Knox Middle School, and Highland Springs Middle School, and four elementary schools (Hammond Hill Elementary, Belvedere Elementary, North Augusta Elementary, and Mossy Creek Elementary), serve the community.

Portions in Edgefield County are in Edgefield County School District. Local private schools include Our Lady of Peace Catholic Church, Victory Baptist Church, and kindergartens at Grace United Methodist Church and First Baptist Church North Augusta. Many students attend private schools across the river in Georgia, at Aquinas High School, Augusta Preparatory Day School, Augusta Christian, Curtis Baptist, Episcopal Day School, Saint Mary on the Hill Catholic School, and Westminster Schools of Augusta. Fox Creek is an independent charter school.

== Library ==
Since 1912, North Augusta has a public library, a branch of the ABBE Regional Library System.

== Media ==
The weekly newspaper in the city is the North Augusta Star, which began publishing in 1954.

As part of Augusta's metropolitan area, the television stations served are mostly identical and includes WJBF, channel 6 (ABC); WRDW, channel 12, (CBS); and WFXG, channel 54 (Fox).

As of 2025, two movies have been filmed in North Augusta including the unreleased 1920 film The Arizona Bandit and That Darn Cat.

== Notable people ==
- Matt Atkins - professional golfer on the PGA Tour
- Craig Baynham - former NFL player
- Theodore Britton Jr. - former U.S. Ambassador
- Scott Brown - professional golfer on the PGA Tour
- Matthew Campbell - former NFL player
- Cecil L. Collins - former mayor
- Tyler Colvin - first round MLB draft pick by Chicago Cubs, currently with San Francisco Giants
- Quinton Ferrell - men's basketball coach at Presbyterian College
- Matt Hazel - current NFL player for the Miami Dolphins and former Coastal Carolina standout
- Skilyr Hicks - singer, America's Got Talent contestant
- Perry Holloway - former U.S. Ambassador
- Mike Ivie - former MLB player
- Sharon Jones - soul singer
- Brenda Lee - singer
- David S. Lewis - aeronautical engineer, former CEO of General Dynamics
- Jim Nabors - singer and actor known for portraying Gomer Pyle
- Matthew NeSmith - professional golfer on the PGA Tour
- Jake Smith - former MLB pitcher
- Fred Vinson - former college football All-American at Vanderbilt
- Rhett Walker - Christian singer
- Charlie Waters - former NFL player for Dallas Cowboys
- Frank Wills - security guard who uncovered the Watergate break-in

== Sister cities ==
North Augusta is twinned with:

- Stará Ľubovňa, Prešov Region, Slovakia (1996)
