= Miss America 1955 =

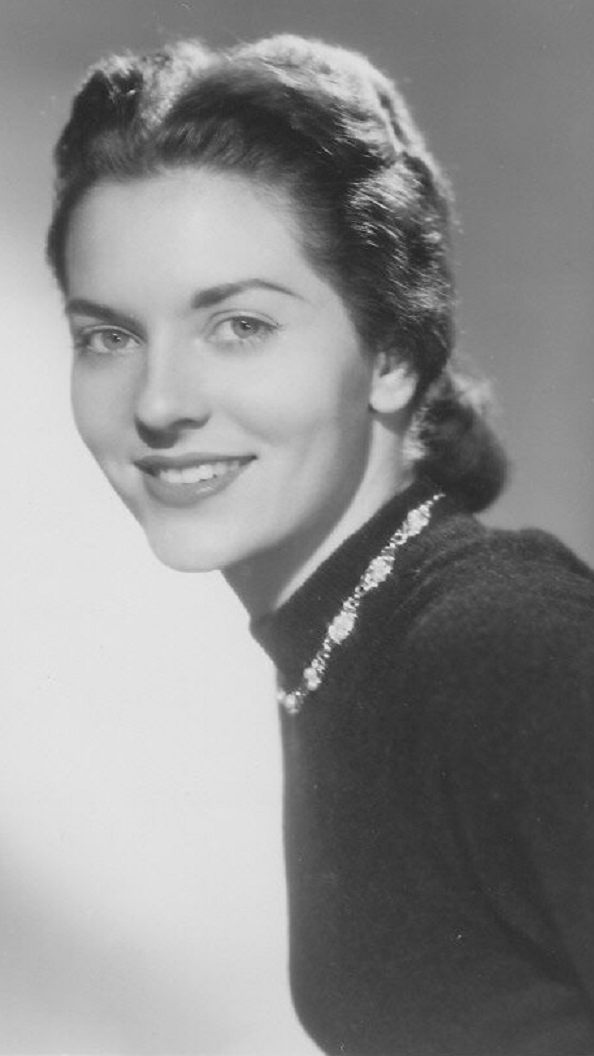
- Date: September 11, 1954
- Presenters: Bob Russell
- Venue: Boardwalk Hall, Atlantic City, New Jersey
- Broadcaster: ABC
- Entrants: 50
- Placements: 10
- Winner: Lee Meriwether; California

Miss America 1955, the 28th Miss America pageant, was held at the Boardwalk Hall in Atlantic City, New Jersey on September 11, 1954, and marked the first live nationally televised broadcast of the competition on ABC.

Crowned the winner was Lee Meriwether, who later came to fame as co-star of the television series Barnaby Jones and as the character Catwoman in the 1966 film version of Batman, and later, Lily Munster on the television series The Munsters Today.

== Results ==
=== Placements ===
Placement	Contestant
Miss America 1955	California – Lee Meriwether
1st runner-up	Florida – Ann Gloria Daniel
2nd runner-up	South Carolina – Rankin Suber
3rd runner-up	Pennsylvania – Barbara Sue Nager
4th runner-up	Michigan – Janice Hutton Somers
Top 10	Alabama – Marilyn Jean Tate; Chicago – Regina Janine Dombeck; District of Columbia – Linda Weisbrod; Ohio – Barbara Maxine Quinlan; Tennessee – Gerry Johnson

=== Awards ===
==== Preliminary awards ====
Awards	Contestant
Lifestyle and Fitness	California - Lee Meriwether; Florida - Ann Gloria Daniel; South Carolina - Rankin Suber
Talent	(Washington, D.C.) District of Columbia - Linda Weisbrod; Ohio - Barbara Maxine Quinlan; Michigan - Janice Hutton Somers (tie); New York City - Heather Taferner (tie)

=== Other awards ===
Awards	Contestant
Miss Congeniality	Illinois - Patsy Bruce
Non-finalist Talent	Hawaii - Kapiolani Miller

== Judges ==
- Grace Kelly

== Contestants ==
State	Name	Hometown	Age	Talent	Placement	Awards	Notes
Alabama	Marilyn Tate	Haleyville	21	Ventriloquism/Classical Vocal	Top 10		
Arizona	Marjorie Nylund	Phoenix		Dramatic Reading, "A Marine's Conversation"			
Arkansas	Sarah Martin	Little Rock		Classical Vocal			
California	Lee Meriwether	San Francisco	19	Dramatic Monologue from Riders to the Sea	Winner	Preliminary Lifestyle & Fitness Award	Actress, best known as Betty Jones in the 1970s television series Barnaby Jones
Canada	Barbara Joan Markham	Cornwall					
Chicago	Regina Dombeck	Chicago		Dramatic Monologue from Mary of Scotland by Maxwell Anderson	Top 10		
Colorado	Barbara Busey	Denver		Vocal/Dance			
Connecticut	Dorothy Hopkins	Storrs		Piano			
Delaware	Barbara Woodall	Claymont		Piano			
(Washington, D.C.) District of Columbia	Linda Weisbrod	Washington, D.C.	21	Classical Vocal, "O Mio Fernando" from La favorite	Top 10	Preliminary Talent Award	
Florida	Ann Gloria Daniel	Dade City	18	Accordion, "Lady of Spain"	1st runner-up	Preliminary Lifestyle & Fitness Award	
(Georgia (U.S. state)) Georgia	Mary Jane Doar	Macon	19	Vocal Medley of songs by George Gershwin			
Hawaii	Kapiolani Miller	Honolulu		Hula		Non-finalist Talent Award	
Idaho	LaVonne Skalsky	Nampa		Dramatic Monologue, "Children of God"			
Illinois	Patsy Bruce	Carbondale		Dramatic Reading		Miss Congeniality	
Indiana	Sue Eaton	Monticello		Art/Photo Display & Hula			
Iowa	Carol Morris	Ottumwa	18	Violin			Later Miss Iowa USA 1956, Miss USA 1956, & Miss Universe 1956
Kansas	Phyllis Danielson	Wichita		Vocal			
Kentucky	Margaret Diane Hunt	Lexington		Dance			
Louisiana	Gail Gleason	Shreveport		Piano & Art			
Maine	Mary Ellen St. John	Old Town		Drama			
Maryland	Phyllis Yvonne Leftwich	Dundalk		Vocal			
Massachusetts	Judith Drake	Fairhaven					
Michigan	Janice Hutton Somers	Lansing		Vocal, "You Made Me Love You"	4th runner-up	Preliminary Talent Award	
Minnesota	Jeanne Reince	Winona		Classical Vocal			
Mississippi	Celeste Luckett	Clarksdale		Drama			
Missouri	Carole Wilkinson	Maplewood		Vocal			
Nebraska	Sue Welch Fisher	Kearney		Classical Vocal, "Un bel dì vedremo" from Madama Butterfly			
Nevada	Janice Babcock	Reno		Ballet, "Blues"			
New Hampshire	Mae Allen	Epping		Drama			
New Jersey	Joan Waller	West Orange		Vocal/Dance, "Singin' in the Rain"			
New York City	Heather Taferner	New York City		Classical Vocal, "L'Air des clochettes" from Lakmé		Preliminary Talent Award	
North Carolina	Betty Ring	Lexington		Dramatic Monologue, "The Sleepwalking Scene" from Macbeth			
North Dakota	Delores Paulson	Bismarck		Violin, "Méditation" from Thaïs			
Ohio	Barbara Quinlin	Alliance		Classical Vocal, "Habanera"	Top 10	Preliminary Talent Award	
Oklahoma	Charlavan Baker	Oklahoma City		Dress Design			
Oregon	Diane Carman	Milwaukie		Drama, "This is America"			
Pennsylvania	Barbara Sue Nager	Philadelphia		Egyptian Ballet Dance, "Egyptian Suite"	3rd runner-up		
Puerto Rico	María del Carmen Mejías						
Rhode Island	Virginia Gregory	Pawtucket		Speech			
South Carolina	Rankin Suber	Whitmire	19	Monologue, "Air Corps"	2nd runner-up	Preliminary Lifestyle & Fitness Award	
South Dakota	Cleo Ann Harrington	Colman		Classical Vocal			
Tennessee	Gerry Johnson	Nashville		Vocal/Character Pantomime, "The Deadwood Stage"	Top 10		
Texas	Yvonne Erwin	Dallas		Piano & Art			
Utah	Maurine Parker	Ogden		Drama, "Anne of the Thousand Days"			
Vermont	Annabelle Pinkham	Brattleboro		Drama			
Virginia	Julie Ann Bruening	Swoope		Charcoal Sketch of "The Statue of Liberty"			
(Washington (state)) Washington	Frances Graham	Spokane		Vocal			
West Virginia	Miriam Reep	Clarksburg		Dance			
Wisconsin	Dixie Sarchet	Stevens Point	19	Modern Dance, "Slaughter on Tenth Avenue"			
