= Miss Universe 1957 =

6th Miss Universe pageant

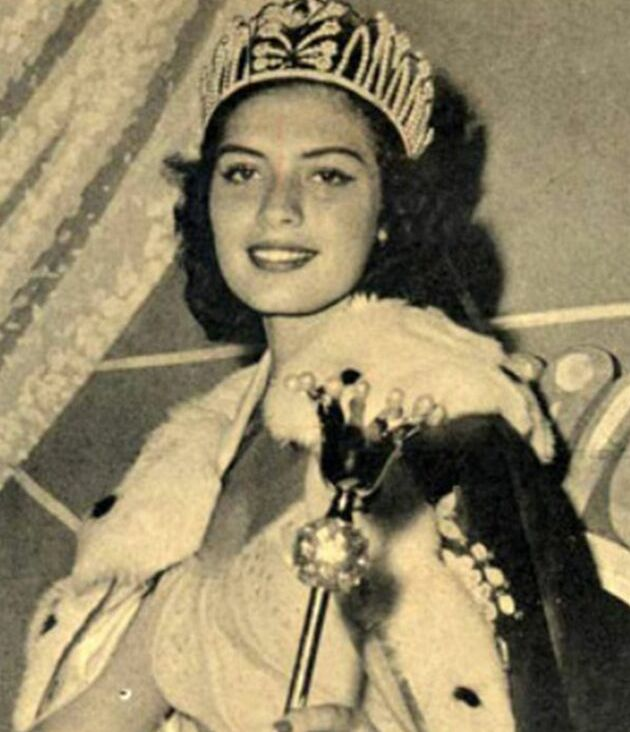
- Gladys Zender
- Date: 19 July 1957
- Presenters: Bob Russell
- Venue: Long Beach Municipal Auditorium, Long Beach, California, United States
- Broadcaster: CBS
- Entrants: 32
- Placements: 15
- Debuts: Martinique; Morocco; Paraguay
- Withdrawals: British Guiana; Chile; Dominican Republic; Holland; United States
- Returns: Austria; Ceylon; Hawaii; South Korea
- Winner: Gladys Zender; Peru
- Congeniality: Mapita Mercado (Puerto Rico)
- Photogenic: Gerti Daub (West Germany)

Miss Universe 1957 was the sixth Miss Universe pageant, held at the Long Beach Municipal Auditorium in Long Beach, California, on 19 July 1957.

Gladys Zender of Peru won the contest, and was crowned by Carol Morris of the United States. Zender was the first representative of Peru to win the contest.

After her win, it was revealed that Zender was only seventeen years old, five months under the contest's minimum age requirement of eighteen. Pageant officials decided that she could keep the crown after they were told she was considered to be eighteen in her country due to an old custom explained to them by the then-Peruvian ambassador to the United States, Fernando Berckemeyer Pazos.

Contestants from thirty-two countries and territories competed in the pageant. It was hosted by Bob Russell for the sixth time.

== Background ==
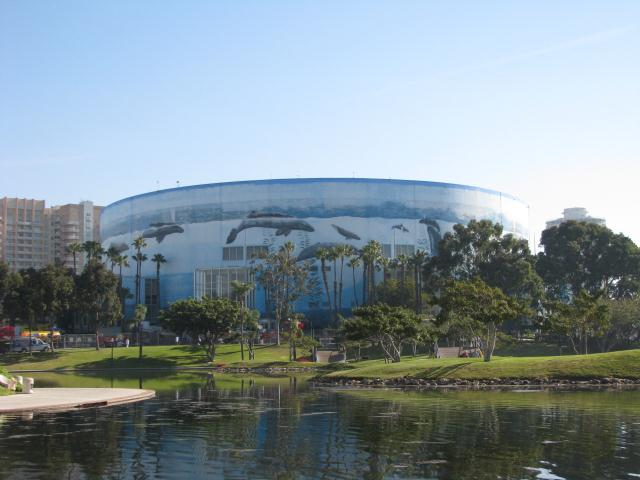
Long Beach Municipal Auditorium, the venue of Miss Universe 1957

=== Selection of participants ===
Contestants from thirty-two countries and territories were selected to compete in the pageant. It was the first where women who were married and had children could not compete, which in turn became the reason why one candidate was disqualified after the preliminary competition. One contestant was selected to replace the original winner.

==== Debuts, returns, and withdrawals ====
This edition saw the debuts of Martinique, Morocco, and Paraguay, and the returns of Austria, Ceylon, Hawaii, and South Korea. Austria and Hawaii last competed in 1953, while Ceylon and South Korea last competed in 1955. The British Guiana, Chile, the Dominican Republic, and the United States withdrew after their respective organizations failed to hold a national competition or appoint a delegate. Corine Rottschäfer of Holland was set to compete, however she had just won another international contest that barred her entry. Rottschäfer competed the following year.

==== Disqualification of Miss USA ====
Leona Gage, Miss USA 1957, was announced as one of the fifteen semi-finalists, but was removed from the contest on the afternoon before the final after it was discovered that she was married and the mother of two young children. Miss Argentina, Mónica Lamas, who was sixteenth in the preliminary competition, replaced Gage. Gage was also stripped of her Miss USA title, and was replaced by Charlotte Sheffield of Utah. Sheffield was unable to compete because the preliminary competition had already taken place. Sheffield competed at Miss World 1957, and was unplaced.

== Results ==
=== Placements ===
Placement	Contestant
Miss Universe 1957	Peru – Gladys Zender
1st Runner-Up	Brazil – Terezinha Morango
2nd Runner-Up	England – Sonia Hamilton
3rd Runner-Up	Cuba – María Gamio
4th Runner-Up	West Germany – Gerti Daub
Top 15	Alaska – Martha Lehmann; Argentina – Mónica Lamas; Austria – Hannerl Melcher; Canada – Gloria Noakes; Greece – Ligia Karavia; Italy – Valeria Fabrizi; Japan – Kyoko Otani; Morocco – Jacqueline Bonilla; Sweden – Inger Jonsson; Uruguay – Gabriela Pascal

=== Special awards ===
Award	Contestant
Miss Friendship	Puerto Rico – Mapita Mercado
Miss Photogenic	West Germany – Gerti Daub
Miss Popular Girl	Canada – Gloria Noakes

== Pageant ==
=== Format ===
As with 1955, fifteen semi-finalists were chosen at the preliminary competition that consisted of a swimsuit and evening gown competition. Each of the fifteen semi-finalists then gave a short speech during the final broadcast in their native language. Afterward, they paraded in their swimsuits and evening gowns, and the five finalists were chosen.

=== Selection committee ===
- Earl Wilson – American journalist and columnist
- Alberto Vargas – Peruvian-American painter known for his "Vargas Girls"
- Vincent Trotta – American artist
- Lois J. Swanson
- Roger Zeiler – French official from the Miss Europe Committee

== Contestants ==
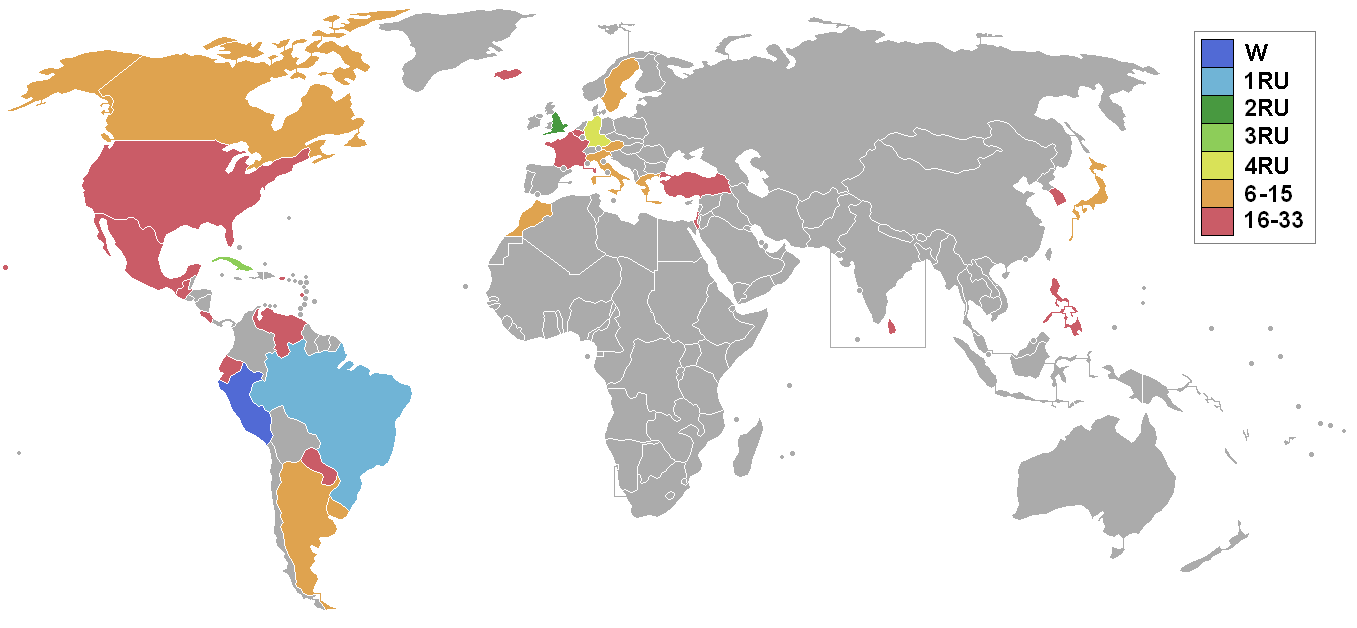
Miss Universe 1957 participating countries and territories

Thirty-two contestants competed for the title.

Country/Territory	Contestant	Age (Note: Ages at the time of the pageant)	Hometown
Alaska	Martha Lehmann	18	Fairbanks
Argentina	Mónica Lamas	20	Buenos Aires
Austria	Hannerl Melcher	19	Vienna
Belgium	Janine Hanotiau	19	Brussels
Brazil	Terezinha Morango	20	São Paulo de Olivença
Canada	Gloria Noakes	18	Toronto
Ceylon	Camellia Perera	23	Colombo
Costa Rica	Sonia Icaza	18	San José
Cuba	María Gamio	19	Havana
Ecuador	Patricia Benítez	19	Guayaquil
England	Sonia Hamilton	23	London
France	Lisa Simon	22	Argenteuil
Greece	Ligia Karavia	18	Athens
Guatemala	Ana Olyslager	18	Guatemala City
Hawaii	Ramona Tong	19	Honolulu
Iceland	Bryndís Schram	19	Reykjavík
Israel	Atara Barzilay	18	Tel Aviv
Italy	Valeria Fabrizi	21	Bologna
Japan	Kyoko Otani	21	Tokyo
Martinique	Ginette Cidalise-Montaise	18	Fort-de-France
Mexico	Irma Arévalo	19	Mexico City
Morocco	Jacqueline Bonilla	19	Casablanca
Paraguay	Lucy Montanero	19	Asunción
Peru	Gladys Zender	17	Lima
Philippines	Mary Ann Corrales	21	Manila
Puerto Rico	Mapita Mercado	18	Santurce
South Korea	Hyun-ok Park	21	Seoul
Sweden	Inger Jonsson	20	Malmö
Turkey	Güler Sirmen	18	Istanbul
Uruguay	Gabriela Pascal	18	Montevideo
Venezuela	Consuelo Nouel	20	Caracas
West Germany	Gerti Daub	19	Hamburg
