= Bernie Wayne =

Bernie Wayne (born Bernard Weitzner; March 6, 1919 – April 18, 1993) was an American composer who wrote over 1,000 songs and music for commercial jingles. He was best known for "Blue Velvet", which was recorded as a hit by numerous artists, and "There She Is", the song long associated with the Miss America pageant, as well as songs written for Elvis Presley, Broadway musicals and Hollywood productions. He also wrote the tune featured in commercials for Chock full o'Nuts which portrayed it as the "heavenly coffee".

== Personal life ==
Wayne was born in 1919 in Paterson, New Jersey. He was married to Phyllis Michelle, and died at the age of 74 of heart failure in Marina del Rey, California on April 18, 1993.

== Career ==
Wayne worked with Ben Raleigh, writing songs for Cass Daley, as well as the 1946 hit "Laughing on the Outside (Crying on the Inside)," which was first popularized by bandleader Sammy Kaye and his orchestra and was featured in the 1950 film noir Gun Crazy. Working with Lee Morris, Wayne co-wrote Blue Velvet, which was performed by Tony Bennett in the 1950s, was a number one hit for Bobby Vinton in the 1960s and has been recorded over the years by such artists as Lana Del Rey. David Lynch's 1986 film Blue Velvet featured the song. On Broadway, he wrote music for Listen to Liz, Skits-oh-Frantics and Torero! He produced the soundtracks for Zorba the Greek in 1964 and for the 1965 film A Patch of Blue as director of artists and repertoire at 20th Century Fox Records.

He also created some of the more memorable instrumental novelty melodies in the Easy Listening genre. Examples include "The Magic Touch" from the film More About Love, "Port-au-Prince" (a Nelson Riddle single), and "Vanessa" (recorded by Hugo Winterhalter and his Orchestra, and used as a theme song for several 1950s TV series.)

The song "There She Is" became the theme song of the Miss America pageant starting in 1955. The pageant had stopped playing the song in 1981 after an argument over royalties for the song and had tried to bring back Bert Parks to sing his trademark song at the 1986 pageant, but he declined.
