= Miss Iowa's Teen =

- Formation: 2004
- Type: Beauty pageant
- Location: Davenport, Iowa
- Members: Miss America's Teen
- Official language: English
- Key people: Taylor Wiebers
- Website: Official website

The Miss Iowa's Teen competition is the pageant that selects the representative of the U.S. state of Iowa in the Miss America's Teen pageant.

Emily Sutton of DeWitt was crowned Miss Iowa's Teen on June 12, 2026, at the Davenport Central Performing Arts Center in Davenport, Iowa. She competed for the title of Miss America's Teen 2027 on September 5, 2026, at the Kravis Center for the Performing Arts in West Palm Beach, Florida.

In January 2023, the official name of the pageant was changed from Miss Iowa’s Outstanding Teen, to Miss Iowa’s Teen, in accordance with the national pageant.

== Results summary ==
The year in parentheses indicates year of Miss America's Outstanding Teen competition the award/placement was garnered.

=== Placements ===
- Top 9: Lydia Fisher (2018)
- Top 11: Avery Bradley (2025), Fiona Treiber (2026)
- Top 15: Francesca Lubecki-Wilde (2012)

=== Preliminary awards ===
- Preliminary Fitness: Avery Bradley (2025)

==== Non-finalist awards ====
- Non-finalist Interview: Aly Olson (2011)
- Non-finalist Talent: Cali Wilson (2019)

==== Other awards ====
- Academic Scholarship: Erica Lester (2007), Jessica Baker (2010)
- Outstanding Dance Talent Award: Cali Wilson (2019)
- Outstanding Instrumental Talent Award: Nina Yu (2016)
- Teens in Action Award Finalists: Savannah Necker (2013), Anna Masengarb (2014), Maggie Leach (2022), Fiona Treiber (2026)
- Top 5 Interview: Francesca Lubecki-Wilde (2012)
- Historic first ever Miss Iowa's Outstanding Teen 2005 - Amanda Sabin

== Winners ==
- Declared as winner
- Ended as a runner-up
- Ended as a finalist or semi-finalist

Year	Name	Hometown	Age	Local title	Talent	Placement at MAO Teen	Special scholarships at MAO Teen	Notes
2026	Emily Sutton	DeWitt	18	Miss Clinton County's Teen	Vocal			
2025	Fiona Treiber	Bettendorf	15	Miss Polk County's Teen	Guitar and Vocal to “9 to 5”	Top 11	Semi-Finalist for Teens In Action	
2024	Avery Bradley	Muscatine	14	Miss Clinton County's Teen	Lyrical Dance	Top 11	Preliminary Fitness Award	Later Miss Iowa Teen USA 2026 Top 10 at Miss Teen USA 2026
2023	Juliana Clark	Clinton	17	Miss Clinton County's Teen	Musical Theatre Vocal			Competed at Miss Iowa 2025. Miss Tanglewood 2026.
2022	Emily Lerch	Fruitland	17	Miss Greater Des Moines' Outstanding Teen	Baton Twirling to Conga			
2021	Maggie Leach	Pella	17	Miss Cedar Valley's Outstanding Teen	Musical Theater Vocal, "You Will Be Found" from Dear Evan Hansen		Teens in Action Finalist	Previously Miss Iowa Teen America 2018. Previously Miss Iowa High School 2020. Later Miss Burlington 2026.
2019-20	Caitlin Crome	Bettendorf	17	Miss Greater Des Moines’ Outstanding Teen	Jazz Dance, "That's Life"			Third Runner Up at Miss Iowa USA 2023
2018	Cali Wilson	Norwalk	17	Miss Central Iowa's Outstanding Teen	Dance, "Turn Your Face" by Little Mix		Non-finalist Talent Award Outstanding Dance Talent Award	First Runner Up at Miss Iowa USA 2025. Miss Palmer Hills 2026
2017	Lydia Fisher	Wapello	14	Miss Muscatine's Outstanding Teen	Tap Dance	Top 9		Later Miss Iowa 2025. 3rd runner-up at Miss Iowa 2021
2016	Julia Campbell	DeWitt	16	Miss Clinton County's Outstanding Teen	Percussion			
2015	Nina Yu	Cedar Rapids	17	Miss Metro's Outstanding Teen	Piano		Outstanding Instrumentalist Talent Award	
2014	Anna Masengarb	Muscatine	17	Miss Scott County's Outstanding Teen	Vocal, "Gimme Gimme" from Thoroughly Modern Millie			Top 10 at Miss Iowa 2016 and 2017. Competing at Miss Iowa 2019 and 2021. Miss Iowa Sweetheart 2021.
2013	Emma Kate Wichman	Bettendorf	16	Miss Scott County's Outstanding Teen	Baton/Twirl			
2012	Savannah Necker	DeWitt	15	Miss Clinton County's Outstanding Teen	Baton/Twirl		Teens in Action Award Finalist	Former featured twirler at University of Northern Iowa
2011	Francesca Lubecki-Wilde	Iowa City	15	Miss Johnson County's Outstanding Teen			Top 5 Interview Award	
2010	Aly Olson	Des Moines	17	Miss Capital City's Outstanding Teen	Vocal		Non-finalist Interview Award	Later Miss Iowa 2014; Top 12 at Miss America 2015 pageant
2009	Jessica Baker	Coralville	16	Miss Henry County's Outstanding Teen	Baton/Twirl		Academic Scholarship Award	
2008	Jessica Jennings	McCausland	15	Miss Scott County's Outstanding Teen	Dance			
2007	Taylor Swartz	Fremont	16	Miss Southern Iowa's Outstanding Teen				
2006	Erica Lester	Muscatine		Miss Scott County's Outstanding Teen	Lyrical Jazz Dance		Academic Scholarship Award	
2005	Amanda Sabin	Walcott	17	Miss Louisa County's Outstanding Teen	Tap Dance to "The Devil Went Down to Georgia".			Historic inaugural Miss Iowa's Outstanding Teen 2005 Later Mrs. Nebraska America 2014 (under married name, Amanda Reinert) Later Mrs. Nebraska Universal 2016; Later Mrs. USA Universal 2017; Later Mrs. Universal 2017
2004	Ashlie Burroughs	Muscatine		Miss Louisa County's Outstanding Teen		No national pageant		
