= Miss USA 1956 =

5th Miss USA pageant

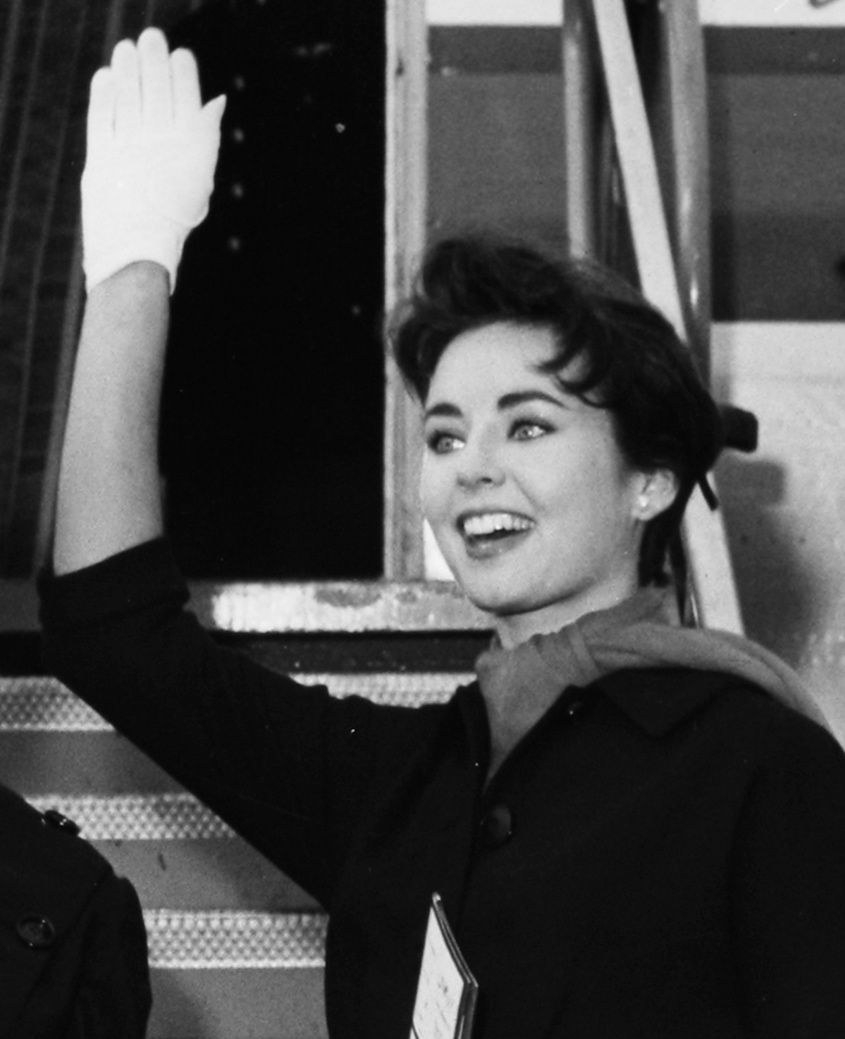
- Carol Morris
- Date: July 18, 1956
- Presenters: Bob Russell
- Venue: Long Beach Municipal Auditorium, Long Beach, California
- Entrants: 43
- Winner: Carol Morris; Iowa

Miss USA 1956 was the fifth Miss USA pageant, held at Long Beach Municipal Auditorium, Long Beach, California on 18 July 1956.

At the end of the event, Carlene King Johnson of Vermont crowned Carol Morris as Miss USA 1956. It is the first victory of Iowa in the pageant's history. Morris later competed at Miss Universe and won.

Contestants from forty-three states and cities competed in the pageant. The competition was hosted by Bob Russell.

== Background ==
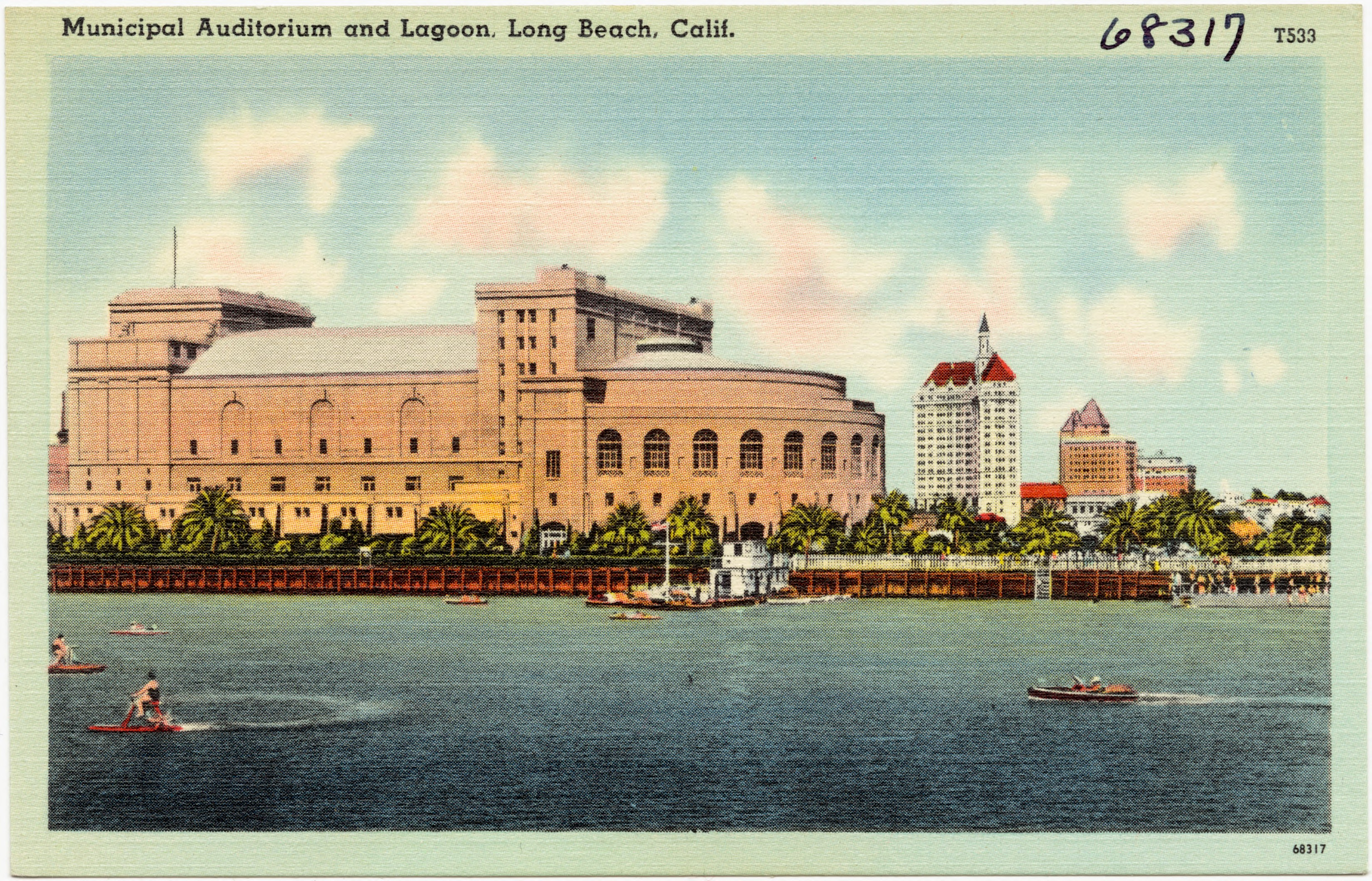
Long Beach Municipal Auditorium, the venue of Miss USA 1956

=== Selection of participants ===
Contestants from forty-three states and cities were selected to compete in the pageant. The age requirement in this edition is still from 18 to 28, where women who are married and have children can also participate. This was the final edition where women who are married and have children can participate until the rule was lifted in 2023.

==== Replacements ====
Nola Flowers, who originally won Miss Utah USA, relinquished her title after she intends to get married before the Miss Universe contest. She was replaced by her first runner-up, Cheryl Brown, as Miss Utah USA.

== Results ==
=== Placements ===
Placement	Contestant
Miss USA 1956	Iowa – Carol Morris
1st runner-up	South Carolina – Betty Cherry
2nd runner-up	Arkansas – Nancy McCollum
3rd runner-up	Nebraska – Shari Lewis
4th runner-up	Texas – Jo Dobson
Top 15	Colorado – Karen Keeler; Maryland – Charlene Holt; Michigan – Barbara Sias; New Jersey – Dolores Winfield; North Carolina – Shirley Bagwell; Ohio – Eleanor Wood; Oregon – Maralyn Turner; Tennessee – Stella Wilson; Utah – Cheryl Brown; Washington – June Svedin

== Contestants ==
Forty-three contestants competed for the title.

State/City	Contestant	Age (Note: Ages at the time of the pageant)	Hometown	Notes
Arizona	Maija Bertulson	18	Tucson	
Arkansas	Nancy McCollum	19	Stuttgart	
California	Shirlee Witty	20	Wilmington	
Colorado	Karen Keeler	21	Denver	
Connecticut	Dorothy Bailey	19	Bridgeport	
Delaware	Sandra McCabe	18	Selbyville	
District of Columbia	Joanne Holler	21	Washington	
Florida	Kim Meyer	26	Oceanway	
Georgia	Mary Ruff	19	Gainesville	
Illinois	Muriel Blair	23	Chicago	
Indiana	Beverly Mattox	19	Milroy	
Iowa	Carol Morris	19	Ottumwa	Previously Miss Iowa 1954; Later won Miss Universe 1956
Louisiana	Cecile Morris	19	Greenwell Springs	
Maryland	Charlene Holt	28	Annapolis	
Massachusetts	Elaine Murphy	21	Weston	
Miami Beach, Florida	Beverly Rogers	20	Miami	
Michigan	Barbara Sias	19	Detroit	
Minnesota	Marilyn Johnson	18	Minneapolis	
Missouri	Carol Rhea Thrower	18	Kemmett	
Nebraska	Shari Lewis	19	Lincoln	
Nevada	Marley Sanderson	21	Las Vegas	
New Hampshire	Rita Leclerc	21	Berlin	
New Jersey	Delores Winfield	21	Cranford	
New Mexico	Jackie Brown	21	Albuquerque	
New York	Kay Douglas	18	New York City	
North Carolina	Shirley Bagwell	18	Raleigh	
North Dakota	Mary Harroun	19	Bismarck	
Ohio	Eleanor Wood	18	Canton	
Oregon	Maralyn Turner	19	Portland	
Pennsylvania	Serena Kifer	20	Monaca	
Philadelphia, Pennsylvania	Miriam Uniman	18	Philadelphia	
Rhode Island	Sandra Vozella	18	Point Judith	
South Carolina	Betty Cherry	20	Orangeburg	Later Miss World United States 1956; 1st runner-up at Miss World 1956
St. Louis, Missouri	Diana Stopke	18	St. Louis	
Tennessee	Stella Wilson	19	Covington	
Texas	Jo Dodson	18	Houston	
Utah	Cheryl Brown	18	Spanish Fork	Replaced Nola Flowers as Miss Utah USA
Vermont	Delores Wettack	21	Westminster	
Virginia	Audra Stark	21	Virginia Beach	
Washington	June Svedin	20	Seattle	
West Virginia	Janet Cardi	24	Belle	
Wisconsin	Priscilla Perkins	20	Milwaukee	
Wyoming	Marilyn Scott	19	Cheyenne	
