= Marina Orschel =

German actress and beauty queen

- Born: July 14, 1937 (age 89); Berlin, Germany
- Occupation: Actress
- Beauty pageant titleholder
- Title: Miss Germany 1956
- Years active: 1956-1963 (film & TV)
- Major competitions: Miss Germany 1956 (Winner); Miss Universe 1956 (1st Runner-Up)

Marina Orschel (born July 14, 1937) is a German actress and beauty pageant titleholder who was crowned Miss Germany 1955 and represented her country at Miss Universe 1955 where she placed 1st Runner-Up. At first her measurements were announced as 36-22-34 inches (91-56-86 cm), but she handed a measuring tape to Miss England and corrected them to 40-27-34 inches (102–69–86 cm). Following these successes, she, Ingrid Goude, and Carol Morris were offered contracts by Universal Pictures, though Orschel's screen appearances are mainly in German films.

== Selected filmography ==
- Das Sonntagskind (1956)
- The Tattered Dress (1957)
- Träume von der Südsee (1957)
- Heute blau und morgen blau (1957)
- Bimbo the Great (1958)
- The Csardas King (1958)

== Bibliography ==
- Richard Koper. Fifties Blondes: Sexbombs, Sirens, Bad Girls and Teen Queens. 2010.
- Bob Larkins & Boyd Magers. The Films of Audie Murphy. McFarland, 2016.
