= Miss Perú 1957 =

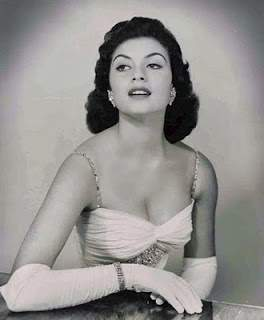
- Date: July 6, 1957
- Presenters: Pepe Ludmir
- Venue: Teatro Municipal (Lima)
- Entrants: 15
- Winner: Gladys Zender Urbina; Loreto

The Miss Perú 1957 pageant was held on July 6, 1957. Fifteen candidates competed for the national crown. The winner represented Peru at the Miss Universe 1957. The rest of the finalists would enter different international pageants.

The winner, Gladys Zender, representing the region of Loreto, would become the first Latin-American woman to win Miss Universe.

== Placements ==
Final Results	Contestant
Miss Peru Universe 1957	Loreto - Gladys Zender
1st Runner-Up	Callao - Lucy Vargas Figallo
2nd Runner-Up	Piura - Bertha Scarpatti
Top 7	Lambayeque - Hella Aita; Arequipa - Consuelo Rodríguez; Distrito Capital - Carmela Berger; Ayacucho - Bertha Elliot

== Special awards ==
- Best Regional Costume - Cuzco - María Luisa Aspiculeta
- Miss Photogenic - Piura - Bertha Scarpatti
- Miss Congeniality - Amazonas - Rosa María Arteaga
- Miss Elegance - Loreto - Gladys Zender

.

== Delegates ==
- Amazonas - Rosa María Arteaga
- Arequipa - Consuelo Rodríguez
- Ayacucho - Bertha Elliot
- Callao - Lucy Vargas Figallo
- Cuzco - María Luisa Aspiculeta
- Distrito Capital - Carmela Berger
- Huancavelica - Maruja Vizquerra
- Junín - Rena Palacios
- La Libertad - Mary Clark
- Lambayeque - Hella Aita
- Loreto - Gladys Zender Urbina
- Moquegua - Gilda Gugluth
- Piura - Bertha Scarpatti
- Puno - Carola Cortez
- Tacna - Rina Badarracco
