= Blanca Heredia =

Venezuelan pageant titleholder (1935–2022)

- Born: Blanca Heredia Osío; 1 April 1934; Caracas, Venezuela
- Died: 17 December 2022 (aged 88)
- Height: 1.65 m (5 ft 5 in)
- Beauty pageant titleholder
- Title: Miss Venezuela 1956
- Hair color: Black
- Eye color: Black
- Major competitions: Miss Venezuela 1956 (Winner); Miss Universe 1956 (Top 15)

Blanca Heredia Osío (1 April 1934 – 17 December 2022) was a Venezuelan actress, model and beauty pageant titleholder who won Miss Venezuela 1956 and was the official representative of Venezuela to the Miss Universe 1956 pageant held in Long Beach, California, United States on 20 July 1956 when she qualified in the Top 15 semifinalists.

Heredia died on 17 December 2022 at the age of 88.

Preceded by Susana Duijm	Miss Venezuela; 1956	Succeeded by Consuelo Nouel
