= Miss Iowa USA =

Beauty pageant competition

- Formation: 1952
- Type: Beauty pageant
- Headquarters: Savage
- Location: Minnesota
- Members: Miss USA
- Official language: English
- Key people: Kelly McCoy
- Website: Official website

The Miss Iowa USA competition is the pageant that selects the representative for the state of Iowa in the Miss USA pageant. It was directed by Future Productions based in Savage, Minnesota since 2008 to 2024.

While Iowa has not been greatly successful in the past four decades, they were one of the most consistent states in the first decade of the pageant's existence. In 1956, Carol Morris became the second Miss USA to win the Miss Universe crown. The most recent placement was Madeline Erickson in 2026, finishing 3rd runner-up.

Jamie Solinger, Miss Teen USA 1992 and Miss Iowa USA 1998, crowned her sister Jaclyn Solinger as Miss Iowa USA 1999.

The current titleholder is Madeline Erickson of Ankeny, who was crowned on May 30, 2026 at The Franklin Center in Des Moines. She represented Iowa at Miss USA 2026, finishing as 3rd runner-up.

== Gallery of titleholders ==
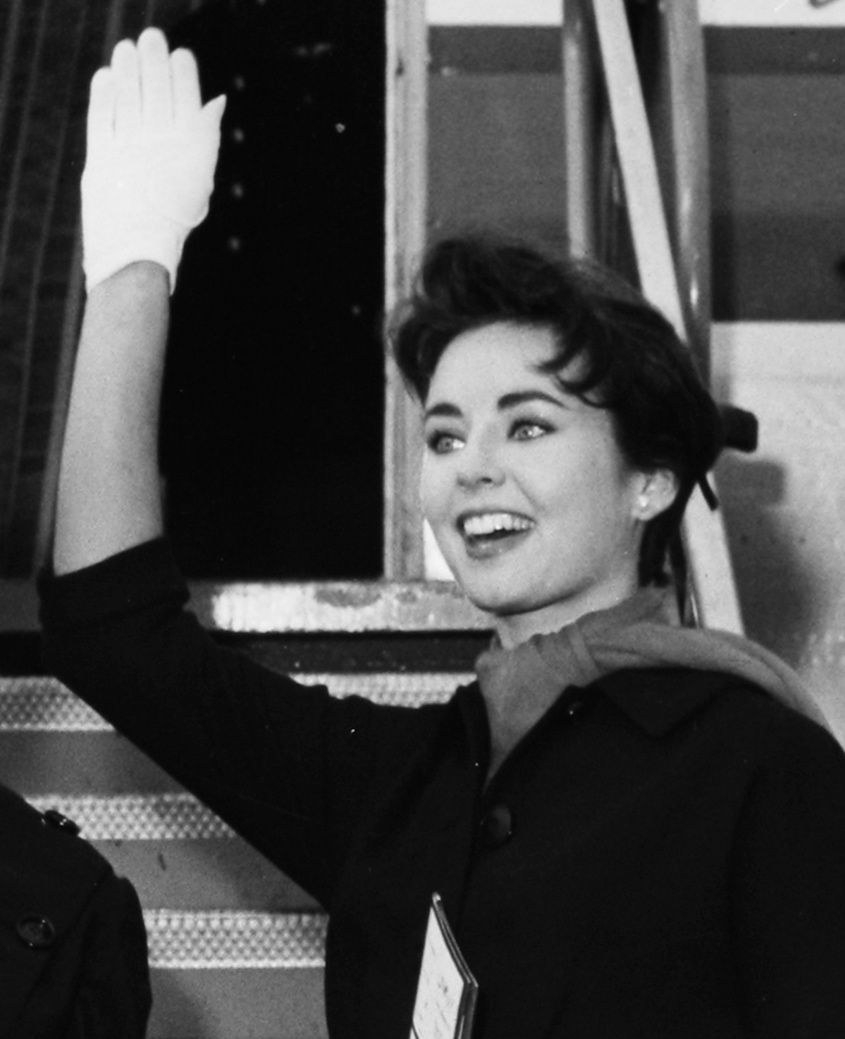
Carol Morris, Miss Iowa USA 1956, Miss USA 1956 and Miss Universe 1956

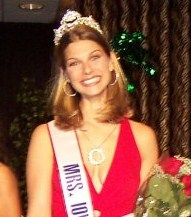
Jamie Solinger, Miss Iowa USA 1998

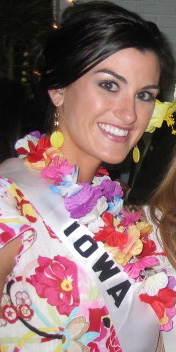
Sarah Corpstein, Miss Iowa USA 2006

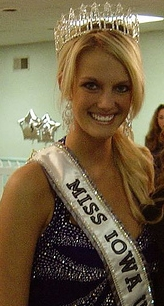
Dani Reeves, Miss Iowa USA 2007

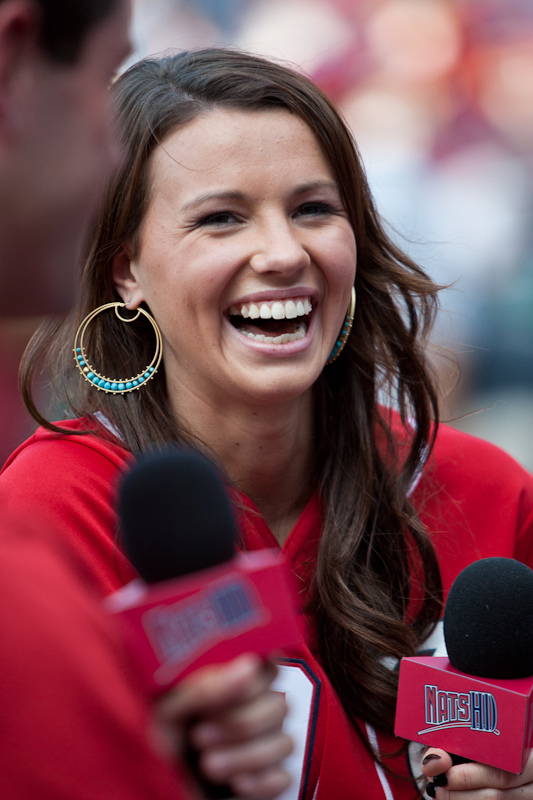
Katherine Connors, Miss Iowa USA 2010

== Results summary ==
=== Placements ===
- Miss USA: Carol Morris (1956)
- 3rd runner-up: Madeline Erickson (2026)
- 5th Runner-up: Carlyn Bradarich (2014)
- Top 10/12: Jan Hoyer (1993), Jensie Grigsby (2000)
- Top 14/15/19/20: Marilyn Shonka (1953), Ione Lucken (1954), Judy Hall (1957), Kay Nielson (1959), Trudy Shulkin (1960), Baylee Drezek (2019), McKenzie Ariana Kerry (2024)

Iowa holds a record of 12 placements at Miss USA.

=== Awards ===
- Miss Congeniality: Dana Mintzer (1983), Rebecca Hodge (2012)
- Interview Award: Madeline Erickson (2026)

== Winners ==
Color key

- Declared as Winner
- Ended as runner-up
- Ended as one of the finalists or semifinalists

Year	Name	Hometown	Age^{1}	Local title	Placement at Miss USA	Special awards at Miss USA	Notes
2026	Madeline "Maddie" Erickson	Ankeny	22	Miss Ankeny	3rd runner-up	Cheslie Kryst Interview Award	Previously Miss Iowa Teen USA 2023; Top 20 at Miss Teen USA 2023
2025	Hayley Buettell	Mediapolis	27	Miss Johnson County			
2024	McKenzie Ariana Kerry	Des Moines	26	Miss Capital City	Top 20	People's Choice	Later Miss Iowa 2026
2023	Grace Lynn Keller	Coralville	24	Miss Johnson County			Previously Miss Iowa 2021
2022	Randi Estabrook	Mitchellville	24	Miss Central Iowa			
2021	Katie Wadman	Iowa City	21	Miss Iowa City			Later Miss District of Columbia 2025
2020	Morgan Kofoid	Leon	22				Previously Miss Iowa Teen USA 2013; Longest reigning Miss Iowa USA at 1 year, 7 months and 2 days
2019	Baylee Drezek	Davenport	21		Top 15		
2018	Jenny Kim Valliere	Cedar Rapids	27				Joining Miss Iowa USA on her 8th consecutive year, before winning the title in 2018
2017	Kelsey Anne Weier	Des Moines	25				Later contestant on season 24 of The Bachelor and season 7 of Bachelor in Paradise.
2016	Alissa Katelin Morrison	Davenport	24				
2015	Taylor Lynn Even	Jesup	21				
2014	Carlyn Nicole Bradarich	Iowa City	23		5th runner-up		Sister of Ashley Bradarich, Miss Illinois USA 2010; Advanced to the top 6 as a fan vote winner; Later Miss Illinois World 2015; Top 12 at Miss World America 2015
2013	Richelle Elizabeth Orr	Hampton	20				Previously Miss Iowa Teen USA 2011
2012	Rebecca Jean Hodge	Iowa City	22			Miss Congeniality	
2011	Rebecca Anne Goldsmith	Chariton	26				
2010	Katherine Anna Connors	Bettendorf	20				Threw out the first pitch at a Washington Nationals baseball game following a joke by Nationals pitcher Miguel Batista at Miss Iowa's expense. Batista sent flowers, but declined Connors' challenge to "walk the runway in a swimsuit."
2009	Chelsea Lynn Gauger	Ames	19				
2008	Abbey Nicole Curran	Davenport	20				First person born with a disability (cerebral palsy) to compete in Miss USA
2007	Dani Reeves	Hamburg	21				
2006	Sarah Corpstein	Anamosa	23				
2005	Joy Robinson	Altoona	25				
2004	Brooke Hansen	Fort Dodge	22				
2003	Linsey Dara Grams	Urbandale	20				
2002	Lauren Wilson	Bettendorf	22				
2001	Clarissa Kroese	Pella	22				
2000	Jensie Grigsby	West Des Moines	26		Top 10, Finishing in 10th Place		
1999	Jaclyn Colleen Solinger	Altoona	20				Sister of Jamie Solinger, Miss Iowa USA 1998
1998	Jamie Solinger	Altoona					Previously Miss Iowa Teen USA 1992; Miss Teen USA 1992; Sister of Jaclyn Solinger, Miss Iowa USA 1999; Later Mrs. Iowa America 2004; 3rd runner-up to Mrs. America 2004 under her married name, Jamie Patterson.
1997	Shawn Marie Brogan	New Hampton					
1996	Jill Simon	Burlington					
1995	Angela Hearne	Mount Vernon					
1994	Callie Pandit	Des Moines					
1993	Janis Ann "Jan" Hoyer	Fort Madison			Top 12		Previously Miss Iowa Teen USA 1987; Sister of Miss Iowa USA 1982 Jeanne Hoyer
1992	Pam Patrick	Ottumwa					
1991	Heather Bowers	Toddville	24				
1990	Elizabeth "Libby" Muelhaupt	Des Moines					
1989	Marcy Requist	Red Oak					
1988	Julie Kemmerling	Des Moines	18				
1987	Katy Lynn Magee	Jefferson	19				
1986	Holly Wilkins	Clear Lake		Miss Iowa City			First runner-up at Miss Iowa USA 1985
1985	Karen K. North	Ames					
1985	Devin Steinberg	Manson	21				Original winner, dethroned after she married during her reign.
1984	Michele Boisvert	Decorah	21				
1983	Dana Ruth Mintzer	Des Moines	21			Miss Congeniality	
1982	Jeanne Hoyer	Fort Madison	21				Sister of Miss Iowa USA 1993 Jan Hoyer
1981	Jennifer Lynn Wimpey	Coralville	19				
1980	Lori Kromminga	Keystone	21	Miss Ames			
1979	Teri Lee Rees	Sioux City	21				
1978	Michelle Elaine Daley	West Des Moines					
1977	Cindy Woodard	Urbandale					
1976	Sheri Lynn Davenport	Des Moines					
1975	Kathleen M. "Kathie" Duggan	Council Bluffs					
1974	Susan Jane Thompson	Cedar Rapids					
1973	Dyanne Roberts	Oskaloosa					
1972	Jennifer Jo Owen	Maxwell					
1971	Cynthia Ann "Cindy" Helmers	Sibley	19			Top 10 Best in Swimsuit	
1970	Jacqueline Lee Jochims	Carroll		Miss Starling			Later represented Iowa in Miss World USA 1970, did not place; Later Miss U.S. International 1971; 3rd runner-up at Miss International 1971
1969	Becky Stoner	Laurens					
1968	Markie Anderson	Sioux City		Miss Morningside			
1967	Kathleen "Kathy" Solt	Jefferson					
1966	Janis Mieras	Alta					
1965	Mari Hardy	Sioux City					
1964	Barbara Rogers	Perry					
1963	Dr. Ramona Kathleen Meylor	Le Mars	23				
1962	Regina Prusha	Marshalltown		Miss Cedar Rapids			
1961	Deanne E. Ostermann	Ocheyedan	19				
1960	Gertrude Cele "Trudy" Shulkin	Sioux City	22	Miss KMNS Sioux City	Semi-finalist		
1959	Catherine Lucille "Kay" Nielson	Council Bluffs	22	Miss Council Bluffs	Semi-finalist		Previously Miss Nebraska 1957
1958	Sandra Mary Olsen	Sioux City	18				
1957	Judith Ann "Judy" Hall	Council Bluffs	20		Semi-finalist		
1956	Carol Ann Laverne Morris	Ottumwa	20		Miss USA 1956		Previously Miss Iowa 1954; Miss Universe 1956
1955	Jerri Jean Cole	Holstein	18				
1954	Ione Luken	Le Mars	20		Semi-finalist		
1953	Marlyn E. Shonka	Pocahontas	20		Semi-finalist		

^{1} Age at the time of the Miss USA pageant
