= Gerti Daub =

German model

- Born: Gerti Daub; 1937 (age 88–89); Utrecht, Netherlands
- Other name: Gerti Hollmann
- Spouse: Carlheinz Hollmann (m. 1958; died 2004)
- Children: 2
- Beauty pageant titleholder
- Title: Miss Hamburg 1957; Miss Germany 1957
- Hair color: Blonde
- Eye color: Blue
- Major competitions: Miss Germany 1957 (Winner); Miss Europe 1957 (2nd Runner-Up); Miss Universe 1957 (4th Runner-Up)
- Website: gertihollmann.de

Gerti Daub Hollmann (née Daub; born 1937) is a German former model who was crowned Miss Germany 1957. Having previously been crowned Miss Hamburg 1957, she went on to represent Germany at Miss Europe 1957 and Miss Universe 1957, where she placed as the second and fourth runner-up respectively.

== Life and career ==
Daub was born in Utrecht and raised in Germany. She was selected as Miss Hamburg 1957.

As Miss Hamburg, Daub competed in Miss Germany 1957 in Baden-Baden. She went on to win the competition, and received the right to represent Germany at both Miss Europe 1957 and Miss Universe 1957. Just days after winning the German title, Daub competed in Miss Europe in Baden-Baden, where she placed as the second runner-up. The following month, she went to Long Beach, California to compete in Miss Universe, where she placed as the fourth runner-up. At both competitions, she also won the special award of Miss Photogenic.

== Personal life ==
Daub married German television presenter Carlheinz Hollmann in 1958, after having met during an interview with Norddeutscher Rundfunk (NDR) earlier that year. Daub and Hollmann had two children together. Hollmann died in 2004.
