= Miss Iowa Teen USA =

Beauty pageant competition

- Formation: 1983
- Type: Beauty pageant
- Headquarters: Savage
- Location: Minnesota
- Members: Miss Teen USA
- Official language: English
- Website: Official Website

The Miss Iowa Teen USA competition is the pageant that selects the representative for the state of Iowa in the Miss Teen USA pageant, which is co-owned by the Miss USA Organization by Crystle Stewart. This pageant is produced by Future Productions, LLC which also produces state pageants for Minnesota, Wisconsin, North Dakota, Colorado, South Dakota, and Wyoming.

Miss Iowa Teen USA 1992 Jamie Solinger was crowned Miss Teen USA at the national pageant held in Biloxi, Mississippi that year. Iowa became the 9th state that won the Miss Teen USA title for the first time.

Solinger is one of only four Iowa teens to cross over and win the Miss Iowa USA title.

Avery Bradley of Muscatine was crowned Miss Iowa Teen USA 2026 May 30, 2026, at The Franklin Center in Des Moines. She will represent Iowa at Miss Teen USA 2026.

== Gallery of titleholders ==
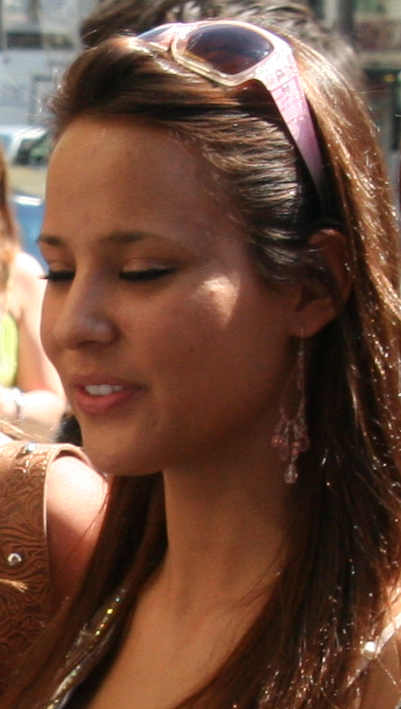
Dakota Crosswhite, Miss Iowa Teen USA 2007

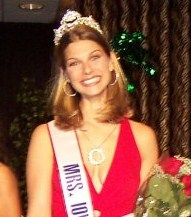
Jamie Solinger, Miss Iowa Teen USA 1992, Miss Teen USA 1992, Miss Iowa USA 1998

== Results summary ==
=== Placements ===
- Winner: Jamie Solinger (1992)
- Top 10: Avery Bradley (2026)
- Top 12: Chelsey Ridge (1995)
- Top 15/16/20: Alyssa Cook (2003), Carley Arnold (2017), Angel Strong (2021), Marisa Mathson (2022), Madeline Erickson (2023)

Iowa holds a record of 8 placements at Miss Teen USA.

=== Special Award ===
- Miss Photogenic: Allyson Hovda (2009)
- Chelsi Smith Congeniality Award: Charlotte Lange (2025)

== Winners ==
- Declared as Winner
- Ended as runner-up
- Ended as one of the finalists or semifinalists

Year	Name	Hometown	Age^{1}	Local title	Placement at Miss Teen USA	Special awards at Miss Teen USA	Notes
2026	Avery Bradley	Muscatine	16		Top 10		Previously Miss Iowa's Teen 2024; Top 11 at Miss America's Teen 2025
2025	Charlotte Lange	Johnston	18	Miss Johnson Teen		Chelsi Smith Congeniality Award	2nd runner-up at Miss Iowa Teen USA 2024
2024	Grace Smithey	Polk City	19	Miss Polk City Teen			Previously Miss Iowa Teen Volunteer 2023; 1st runner-up at Miss Teen Volunteer America 2024
2023	Madeline "Maddie" Erickson	Ankeny	19	Miss Ankeny Teen	Top 20		3rd runner-up at Miss Iowa Teen USA 2022; Later Miss Iowa USA 2026; 3rd runner-up at Miss USA 2026
2022	Marisa Mathson	Waukee	17	Miss Dallas County Teen	Top 16		
2021	Angel Strong	West Des Moines	19	Miss West Des Moines Teen	Top 16		Eligible as a student of Drake University at the time of crowning; 3rd runner-up at Miss Nebraska Teen USA 2019; 2nd runner-up at Miss Nebraska USA 2024
2020	Hailey Parton	West Des Moines	17				Participated in Miss Iowa’s Outstanding Teen 2019
2019	Kristen Hovda	Cedar Rapids	18				Sister of Allyson Hovda, Miss Iowa Teen USA 2009; 3rd runner-up at Miss Iowa Teen USA 2018
2018	Isabella Russell	Marshalltown	17				
2017	Carley Arnold	Chariton	17		Top 15		
2016	Hannah Bockhaus	Tripoli	17				2nd runner-up at Miss Iowa Teen USA 2015
2015	Aryn Book	Adel	18				Participated at Miss Iowa Teen USA 2012; 1st runner-up at Miss Iowa Teen USA 2013; 3rd runner-up at Miss Iowa Teen USA 2014; 3rd runner-up at Miss Iowa USA 2020
2014	Amanda Armstrong	Sioux City	16				2nd runner-up at Miss Iowa Teen USA 2012 and 2013
2013	Morgan Kofoid	Leon	16				Later Miss Iowa USA 2020; 2nd runner-up at Miss Iowa USA 2017 and 2019; Top 13 at Miss Iowa USA 2018
2012	Carissa Becker	Waterloo	17				1st runner-up at Miss Iowa Teen USA 2011
2011	Richelle Elizabeth Orr	Hampton	19				2nd runner-up at Miss Iowa Teen USA 2010; Later Miss Iowa USA 2013
2010	Erica Lansman	Bettendorf	19				Top 15 at Miss Iowa USA 2014; Top 20 at Miss New York USA 2017; Top 21 at Miss New York USA 2019
2009	Allyson "Aly" Hovda	Cedar Rapids	18			Miss Photogenic	Originally first runner-up; assumed the title after Ally Cymboluk resigned; Sister of Kristen Hovda, Miss Iowa Teen USA 2019; Later National All-American Miss 2012–2013; Top 15 at Miss Iowa USA 2013
2009	Ally Cymboluk	Waukon	16		Did not compete		Relinquished the title on January 1, 2009, for personal reasons.
2008	Emily Bey	Cedar Rapids	18				Participated at Miss Iowa Teen USA 2007; Participated at Miss Illinois USA 2013 and 2015
2007	Dakota Crosswhite	Cedar Rapids	18				4th runner-up at Miss Iowa Teen USA 2006; 4th runner-up at Miss Iowa USA 2010 and 2014; 3rd runner-up at Miss Iowa USA 2011; 1st runner-up at Miss Iowa USA 2012; Top 15 at Miss Iowa USA 2013
2006	Danielle Malatek	North Liberty	17				2nd runner-up at Miss Iowa Teen USA 2005; Top 15 at Miss Iowa USA 2024
2005	Jocelyn Ranae Borkowski	Harlan	17				3rd runner-up at Miss Kansas USA 2012
2004	Shannon Hofmeister	Oelwein	18				
2003	Alyssa Anne Cook	Adel	18		Top 15		Top 13 at Miss Iowa USA 2005
2002	Haley Johnson	Atlantic	18				
2001	Ashley Hanson	Spencer	17				Later Miss Iowa Teen United States 2002; Top 14 at Miss Rhode Island USA 2008; 2nd runner-up at Miss Iowa USA 2009; 3nd runner-up at Miss Iowa USA 2010
2000	Jennifer Ellison	Bettendorf	17				
1999	Teresa Moberg	Des Moines	19				Participated at Miss Iowa USA 2002
1998	Arianna "Ari" Kem	Harlan	17				2nd runner-up at Miss Iowa USA 2002
1997	Sarah Sucher	Urbandale	18				
1996	Allison Dickey	Packwood	19				
1995	Chelsey Christine Ridge	Muscatine	17		Top 12		Top 12 at Miss Iowa USA 2000; Participated at Miss Iowa USA 2002; Top 8 at Miss Iowa 2002
1994	Erika Miller	Indianola	18				
1993	Melissa Baxter	Marion	18				
1992	Jamie R. Solinger	Altoona	18		Miss Teen USA 1992		Sister of Jaclyn Solinger, Miss Iowa USA 1999; Later Miss Iowa USA 1998; Later Mrs. Idaho America 2004; 3rd runner-up to Mrs. America 2004 under her married name, Jamie Patterson.
1991	Christina "Tina" Foehring	Fort Madison	19				2nd runner-up at Miss Iowa Teen USA 1990; 3rd runner-up at Miss Iowa USA 1994
1990	Faith Windsor	Cedar Rapids	17				
1989	Stacie Marie Beckwith	Boone	18				1st runner-up at Miss Iowa USA 1989
1988	Stacey Horst	Vail	15				
1987	Janis Ann "Jan" Hoyer	Fort Madison	17				Later Miss Iowa USA 1993; finished 8th at Miss USA 1993
1986	Kristin S. "Kris" Hudson	Des Moines	17				
1985	Alisha Black	Ames	17				
1984	Kim Carlson	Des Moines	16				
1983	Kimberly Lane "Kim" Heck	Des Moines	16				

^{1} Age at the time of the Miss Teen USA pageant
