= Miss Venezuela 1956 =

4th edition of the Miss Venezuela competition

- Date: June 30, 1956
- Venue: Tamanaco Intercontinental Hotel, Caracas, Venezuela
- Entrants: 15
- Placements: 5
- Winner: Blanca Heredia †; Distrito Federal

Miss Venezuela 1956 was the fourth edition of Miss Venezuela pageant held at Tamanaco Intercontinental Hotel in Caracas, Venezuela, on June 30, 1956, after days of events. The winner of the pageant was Blanca Heredia, Miss Distrito Federal.

== Results ==
=== Placements ===
- Miss Venezuela 1956 – Blanca Heredia † (Miss Distrito Federal)
- 1st runner-up – Celsa Pieri (Miss Sucre) to Miss World 1956
- 2nd runner-up – Elizabeth Rotundo (Miss Aragua)
- 3rd runner-up – Alida Marquis (Miss Departamento Libertador)
- 4th runner-up – Beatriz Gutiérrez (Miss Caracas)

== Contestants ==
- Miss Amazonas – Beatriz Bello
- Miss Aragua – Elizabeth Rotundo
- Miss Barinas – Lourdes Agostini Oquendo
- Miss Caracas – Beatriz Gutiérrez Padrón
- Miss Delta Amacuro – Alba Guevara
- Miss Departamento Libertador – Alida Márquiz
- Miss Distrito Federal – Blanca (Blanquita) Heredia Osío †
- Miss Guárico – Belén Infante
- Miss Lara – Fanny Torrealba
- Miss Maracaibo – Lady Josefina Andrade
- Miss Miranda – Aracelis Mora
- Miss Nueva Esparta – Ennia Mendoza
- Miss Sucre – Celsa Drucila Pieri Pérez
- Miss Trujillo – Lilian Haack
- Miss Zulia – Iris Rubio
