= Skeleton on Horseback =

- Directed by: Hugo Haas
- Written by: Hugo Haas
- Based on: Bílá nemoc by Karel Čapek
- Produced by: Jan Sinnreich; Vladimír Kabelík
- Starring: Hugo Haas; Zdeněk Štěpánek
- Cinematography: Otto Heller
- Edited by: Antonín Zelenka
- Music by: Jan Branberger
- Production company: Moldaviafilm
- Distributed by: Moldaviafilm
- Release date: 21 December 1937
- Running time: 103 minutes
- Country: Czechoslovakia
- Language: Czech

Skeleton on Horseback aka The White Disease (Czech: Bílá nemoc) is a 1937 Czechoslovak drama film directed by and starring Hugo Haas. It revolves around an infectious disease which breaks out during a war. It is based on the play The White Disease by Karel Čapek.

== Cast ==
- Hugo Haas as Dr. Galén
- Bedřich Karen as Professor Sigelius
- Zdeněk Štěpánek as The Marshal
- Václav Vydra as Baron Olaf Krog
- František Smolík as Krog's Accountant
- Helena Friedlová as Accountant's Wife
- Ladislav Boháč as Krog's nephew
- Karla Oličová as The Marshal's Daughter Aneta
- Jaroslav Průcha as Dr. Martin
- Vladimír Šmeral as First Assistant
- Vítězslav Boček as Accountant's Son
- Eva Svobodová as Accountant's Daughter

== Reception ==
In a contemporary review, the film was reviewed in Variety in 1940, who noted that Čapek's conception "isn't entirely clear, he appears to be taking the dramatic theme that Fascism is a sort of white plague that scourges the people who follow its philosophy." The reviewer noted that Čapek's "thinking is logical [but] he has certainly over-simplified the struggle between war and peace." The review continued that the film contained "many gripping scenes" praising "moments such as the meeting between the doctor and the dictator and the solitary vigil as zero hour for the invasion approaches, while "mob scenes are comparatively inept, and such matters as sound, lighting, photography and so on are inferior."
