= Miss Europe 1957 =

International beauty pageant

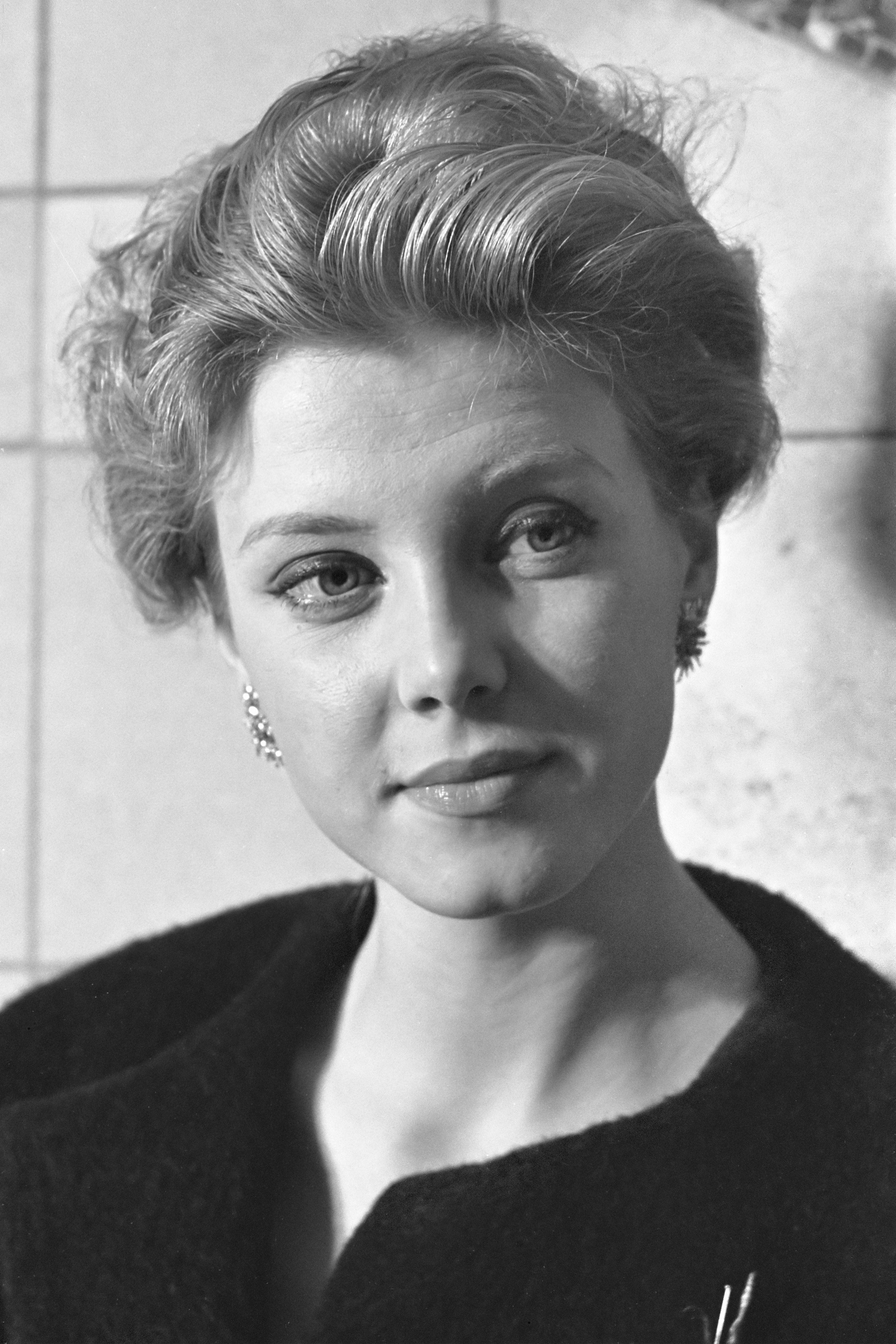
- Corine Rottschäfer
- Date: 26 June 1957
- Venue: Baden-Baden, West Germany
- Entrants: 15
- Debuts: Iceland
- Withdrawals: Ireland; Switzerland
- Returns: Denmark; Luxembourg; Spain
- Winner: Corine Rottschäfer; Holland
- Photogenic: Gerti Daub (West Germany)
- Miss Elegance: Geneviève Zanetti (France)

Miss Europe 1957, was the 20th edition of the Miss Europe pageant, held in Baden-Baden, West Germany on 26 June 1957. At the end of the event, Margit Nünke of West Germany crowned Corine Rottschäfer of Holland as Miss Europe 1957.

Contestants from fifteen countries competed in this year's pageant.

== Results ==
=== Placements ===
Placement	Contestant
Miss Europe 1957	Holland – Corine Rottschäfer
1st Runner-Up	Finland – Marita Lindahl
2nd Runner-Up	West Germany – Gerti Daub
3rd Runner-Up	France – Geneviève Zanetti
4th Runner-Up	England – Sonia Hamilton

=== Special awards ===
Award	Contestant
Miss Elegance	France – Geneviève Zanetti
Miss Photogenic	Germany – Gerti Daub

== Contestants ==
=== Selection of participants ===
Contestants from fifteen countries competed in this edition. This edition saw debut of Iceland, the returns of Denmark, Luxembourg and Spain, and the withdrawals of Ireland and Switzerland.

=== List of contestants ===
Fifteen contestants competed for the title.

Country/Territory	Contestant	Age (Note: Ages at the time of the pageant)	Hometown
Austria	Elisabeth Schübel-Auer	20	Vienna
Belgium	Madeleine Hotelet	25	Brussels
Denmark	Lilian Juul Madsen	19	Copenhagen
England	Sonia Hamilton	23	London
Finland	Marita Lindahl	18	Helsinki
France	Geneviève Zanetti	18	Paris
Greece	Maria Tsipi	–	Athens
Holland	Corine Rottschäfer	19	Amsterdam
Iceland	Runa Brynjolfsdottir	–	Reykjavík
Italy	Bianca Maria Vitelli	25	Rome
Luxembourg	Josee Jaminet	18	Luxembourg City
Spain	Viola López Martínez	–	–
Sweden	Rigmor Alfredsson	–	–
Turkey	Suna Azak	–	–
West Germany	Gerti Daub	19	Hamburg

== Miss Europe 1957 (Comité Officiel et International Miss Europe) ==
Miss Europe 1957
- Date: June 1957
- Venue: Paris, France
- Entrants: 2+
- Debuts: Yugoslavia
- Winner: Ingrid Weiss; West Germany

Miss Europe 1957 was the fourth edition of the Miss Europe pageant organized by the "Comité Officiel et International Miss Europe", held in Paris, France in June 1957. At the end of the event, Ingrid Weiss of West Germany was crowned as Miss Europe 1957.

=== Placements ===
Placement	Contestant
Miss Europe 1957	West Germany – Ingrid Weiss

=== List of contestants ===
Country/Territory	Contestant	Age	Hometown
West Germany	Ingrid Weiss	–	Zittau
Yugoslavia	Bosilka Vidovic	–	Belgrade
