= Jamie Solinger =

American beauty queen and model (born 1975)

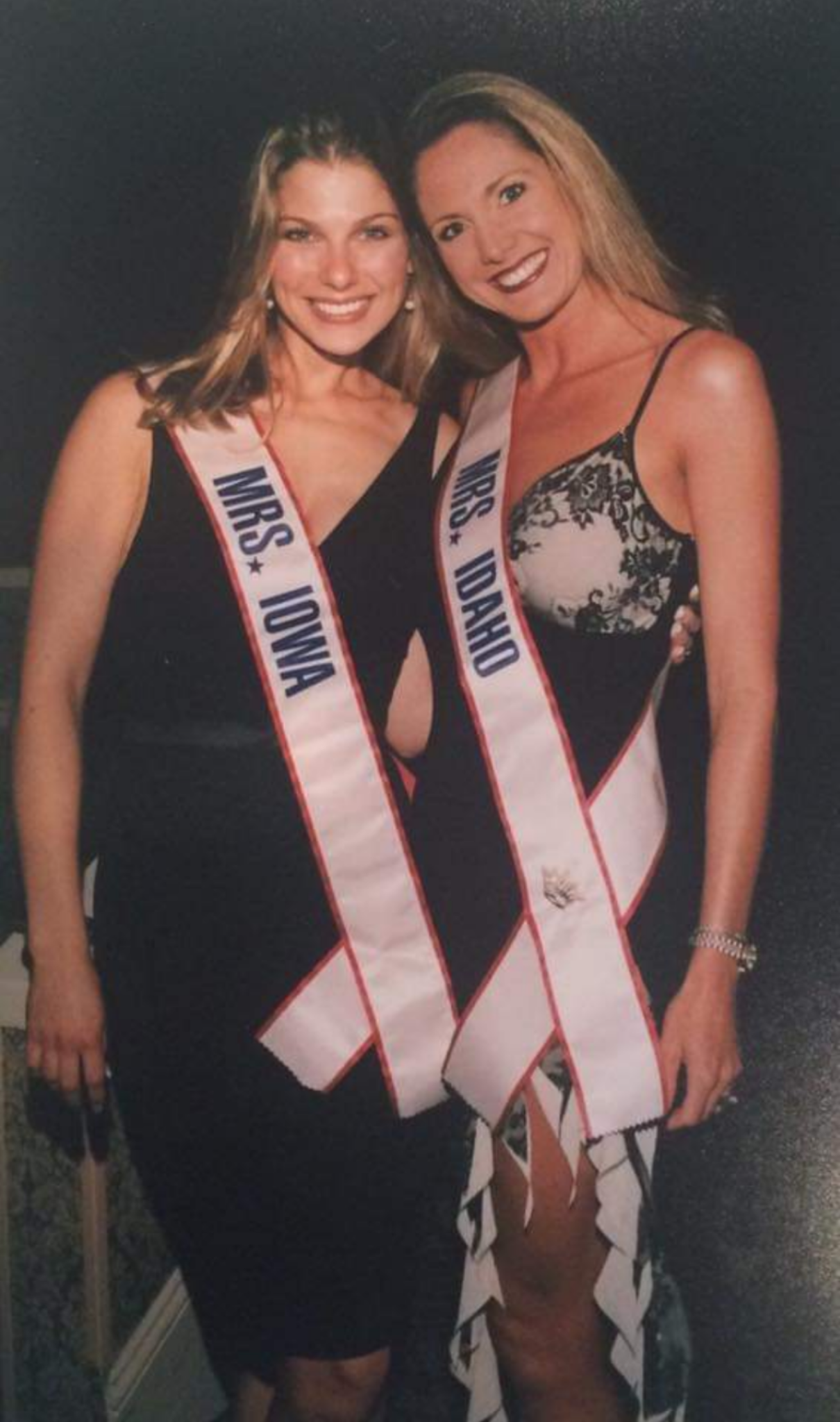
- Grimes at Mrs. America 2004
- Born: Jamie Solinger; Altoona, Iowa, U.S.
- Other names: Jamie Patterson; Jamie Grimes
- Height: 1.75 m (5 ft 9 in)
- Beauty pageant titleholder
- Title: Miss Iowa Teen USA 1992; Miss Teen USA 1992; Miss Iowa USA 1998; Mrs. Iowa 2004
- Hair color: Light brown
- Eye color: Blue
- Major competitions: Miss Teen USA 1992 (Winner); Miss USA 1998 (Unplaced); Mrs. America 2005 (3rd runner-up)

Jamie Grimes (née Solinger formerly Patterson, born c. 1975) is an American model and beauty queen who became the first and so far only woman from Iowa to capture the Miss Teen USA crown and placed third runner-up to Mrs America 2005.

== Modeling career ==
Solinger started modeling through a Miss Caboodles competition sponsored by Teen Magazine. She placed as one of six regional finalists and was flown to Santa Monica, CA for a week long photo shoot. Another regional finalist there was Julee Kleffman, Miss Illinois Teen USA '92. Upon returning to Iowa, Jamie was signed with Ford New York. While with Ford, she worked for magazines such as Seventeen and Glamour. During a summer home from New York, she was spotted by the Iowa pageant directors and recruited to enter the Miss Iowa Teen USA 1992 pageant. After her pageant years were served, she moved to South Beach Miami where she continued to model for places such as Sunglass Hut, Newport News, JC Penney, some French editorial, and German catalogs. She eventually returned to Iowa to work with Hawthorne Direct, an infomercial producer, with whom she did work for Time, OxyClean, and Clorox.

== Miss Teen USA ==
Solinger competed as Miss Iowa Teen USA in the 1992 Miss Teen USA pageant, broadcast from Biloxi, Mississippi on 25 August 1992.

Although the pageant was to be televised live, the threat of Hurricane Andrew meant the pageant had to be recorded earlier. Both Solinger and eventual first runner-up, Angela Logan of Oklahoma were taped "winning" the pageant to maintain suspense. Only Solinger's crowning moment was shown on television as the legitimate titleholder.

Solinger would become the first and only Miss Teen USA from Iowa and only the second teen from her state to place in the national pageant. Iowa would not place again until 1995 and 2003.

== Miss USA ==
Solinger won the title of Miss Iowa USA in 1998, and competed in the 1998 Miss USA pageant alongside Shauna Gambill of California who was Miss Teen USA in 1994.

This would be the last time any former Miss Teen USA titleholder would take part in a Miss USA pageant. Before them, Kelly Hu competed in 1993 and Brandi Sherwood in 1997.

This would also be the second and last time two Miss Teen USA winners would compete in the same Miss USA pageant. The only other time this happened was in 1984, when Ruth Zakarian and Cherise Haugen competed with a Miss Teen USA sash, following an old rule from the Miss Universe Organization that allowed them to compete without going through the state pageant system.

After completing her year as Miss Iowa USA, Jamie crowned her sister Jaclyn as Miss Iowa USA 1999. They are one of few pairs of sisters to compete at Miss USA, and only second to win the same title in subsequent years. It would not happen again until 2003-2004 when sisters Alicia and Justine Michioka won consecutive Miss Hawaii USA titles.

== Mrs. America ==
Solinger (formerly Patterson) then went on to win the 2004 Mrs. Iowa pageant and became third runner-up to Mrs. America 2005.

== Gallery ==
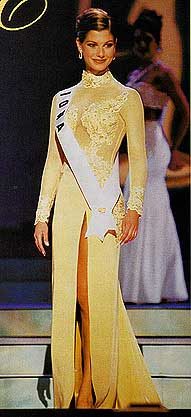
Miss Iowa USA 1998

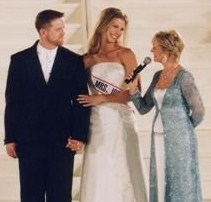
Solinger with Tim Patterson

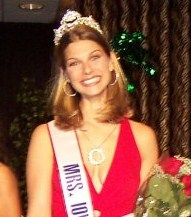
Mrs. Iowa America 2004
