= Gladys Zender =

Peruvian model and beauty queen (born 1939)

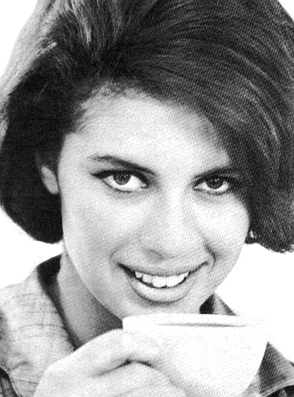
- Gladys Zender in a 1962 ad
- Born: Gladys Rosa Zender Urbina; 19 October 1939 (age 86); Lima, Peru
- Height: 1.70 m (5 ft 7 in)
- Spouse: Antonio Meier (m. 1965)
- Children: 4, including Christian
- Beauty pageant titleholder
- Title: Miss Peru 1957; Miss Universe 1957
- Hair color: Black
- Eye color: Brown
- Major competitions: Miss Peru 1957 (Winner); Miss Universe 1957 (Winner)

Gladys Rosa Zender de Meier (née Zender Urbina; born 19 October 1939) is a Peruvian model and beauty queen who became the first Latina to win the Miss Universe title. She was crowned Miss Peru Universe 1957 by Miss Peru Universe 1956, Lola Sabogal Morzán.

== Miss Universe ==
Zender won the title of Miss Universe 1957 in Long Beach, California, United States.

After being crowned, it was revealed that she was only 17 years old, a few months under the contest's minimum age requirement. Pageant officials decided that she could keep the crown after they were told she was considered to be 18 in Peru.

== Return to Peru ==
Zender became an instant celebrity.

- She flew on the inaugural flight from Idlewild International Airport in New York City, New York, to Lima Airport in Lima, Peru, where she was greeted by thousands of fans.
- Caretas, one of Peru's most-popular newsmagazines, soon featured Zender on their cover. She was also later featured on that publication's first all-color cover.
- In March 1958, she agreed to accompany the then sailor Juan Carlos de Borbon, who was on a 4-day stay in Lima during his time as a trainee aboard Spain's insignia ship, the Sebastian Elcano, to a couple of social events. He became King of Spain in 1975 and abdicated the crown to his son Felipe VI, in 2014.
- The Peruvian composer Alicia Maguiña wrote a song called "Polka a Gladys Zender" (Polka dedicated to Gladys Zender). It was also titled "La más hermosa" (The most beautiful) and was recorded by the Peruvian group Los Troveros Criollos.

== Personal life ==
Zender married Antonio Meier in 1965, and secluded herself into a family life; they had four children together. Their son, Christian Meier, is a well-known actor and singer in Peru and has achieved some fame in other Latin American countries. In 2003, Zender allowed Caretas to photograph her (and Meier's) home showcasing various artifacts, including a collection of Incan art the couple have acquired through their years together.

Awards and achievements
Preceded by (United States) Carol Morris	Miss Universe; 1957	Succeeded by (Colombia) Luz Marina Zuluaga †
Preceded by Lola Sabogal	Miss Peru; 1957	Succeeded by Beatriz Boluarte
