= Corine Rottschäfer =

Dutch model, Miss Europe 1957, and Miss World 1959 (1938–2020)

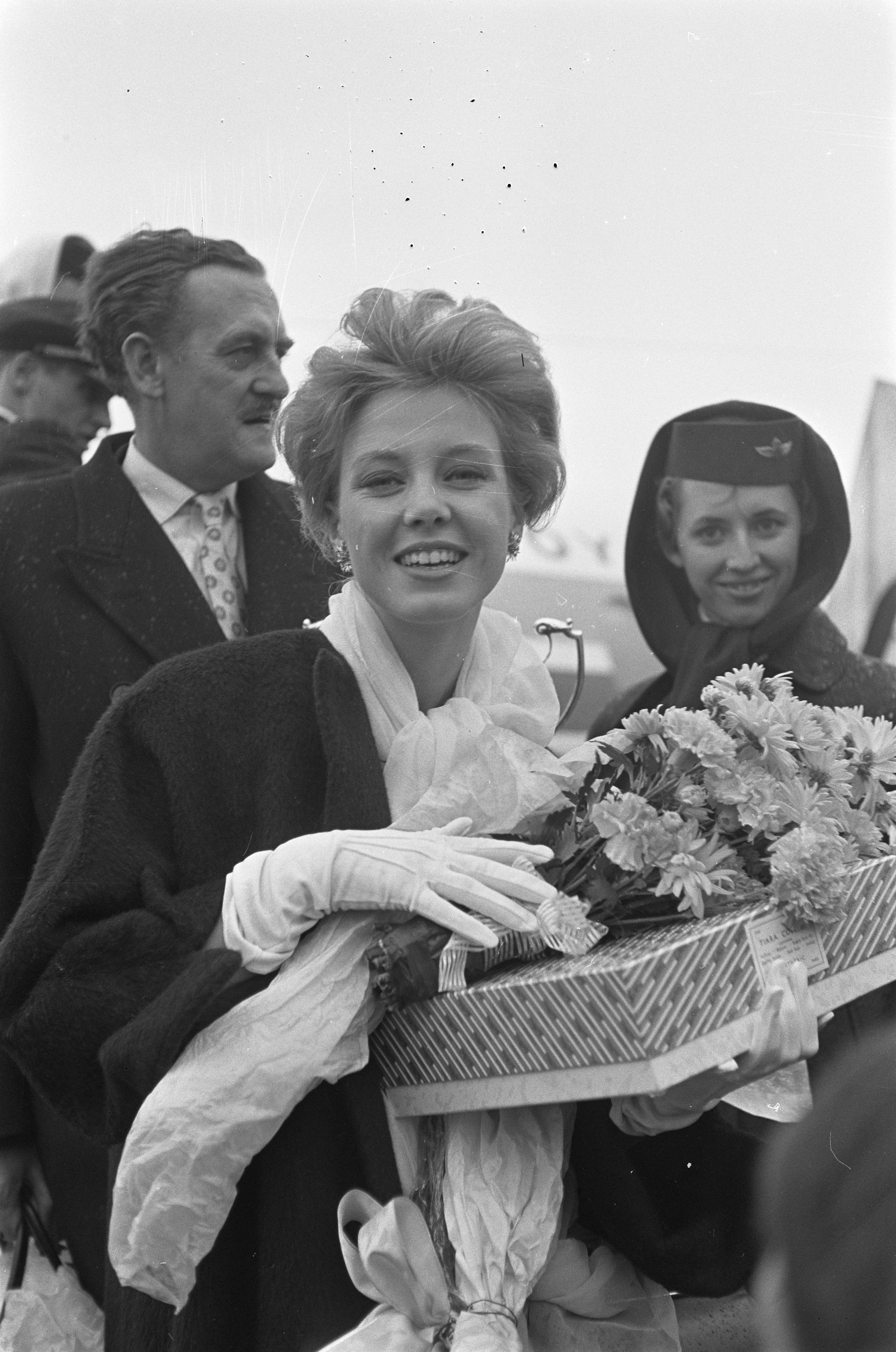
- Rottschäfer in 1959
- Born: 8 May 1938; Hoorn, Netherlands
- Died: 24 September 2020 (aged 82); Amsterdam, Netherlands
- Occupation: Model
- Beauty pageant titleholder
- Major competitions: Miss Holland 1957 (Winner); Miss Europe 1957 (Winner); Miss Universe 1958 (Top 15) (Miss Photogenic); Miss World 1959 (Winner)

Corine Spier-Rottschäfer (8 May 1938 – 24 September 2020) was a Dutch model and beauty queen who won Miss World 1959 contest, representing the Netherlands. She was the first woman from her country to win the title. The pageant was held in London, United Kingdom.

== Life ==
Rottschäfer was born on 8 May 1938 in Hoorn. Prior to winning the Miss World title, Rottschäfer also won Miss Europe in the year 1957. She also participated in Miss Universe pageant in the year 1958, where she reached top 15 and won the Miss Photogenic award.

At the Miss World 1959 pageant, a few hours before the announcement of the winner, Corine discovered holes in her evening dress. Miss Israel, Ziva Shomrat was kind enough to lend her an evening dress and it so happened that Corine was adjudged the winner and Miss Israel finished third in the competition. In 1962 she married architect and later politician Edo Spier.

In 1964, after a successful international career in modeling, she founded the model agency Corine's Agency in Amsterdam which was the first professional model agency in the Netherlands. The agency ran into trouble, because that kind of job placement wasn't allowed at the time. Rottschäfer appealed her case all the way to the Supreme Court, and forced the law to be changed. She ran the agency until her retirement in 2002.

She is the second cousin of Miss Universe Puerto Rico 2012, Bodine Koehler.

She died on 24 September 2020.

Awards and achievements
Preceded by (South Africa) Penelope Coelen	Miss World; 1959	Succeeded by (Argentina) Norma Cappagli
Preceded by Rita Schmidt	Miss Holland; 1957	Succeeded by Luciënne Struve
