= Bert Parks =

American actor and singer (1914–1992)

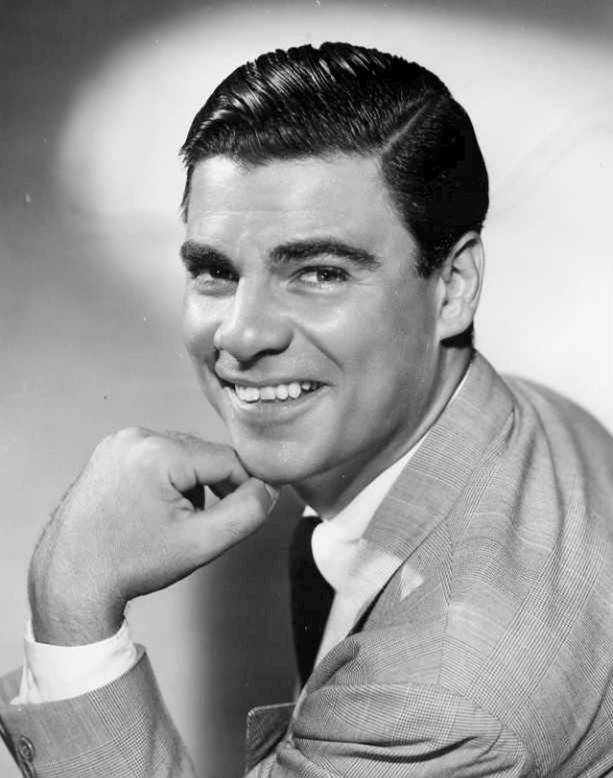
- Parks in 1956
- Born: Bertram Jacobson; December 30, 1914; Atlanta, Georgia, U.S.
- Died: February 2, 1992 (aged 77); La Jolla, California, U.S.
- Occupations: Actor; singer; radio and television announcer
- Years active: 1930–1991
- Spouse: Annette Liebman
- Children: 3

Bert Parks (born Bertram Jacobson; December 30, 1914 – February 2, 1992) was an American actor, singer, and radio and television announcer, best known for hosting the annual Miss America telecast from 1955 to 1979.

== Early life ==
Parks was born in Atlanta, Georgia, to Aaron Jacobson, a Jewish merchant who had immigrated to the United States in 1900 from Latvia (then part of the Russian Empire), and his wife Hattie (Spiegel) Jacobson, the daughter of immigrants from Austria-Hungary. He had one older brother, Allen Jacobson.

Parks had his first experience in amateur theatre when he was four years old. He graduated from Marist School, a Catholic preparatory school in Atlanta.

== Radio ==
Parks entered radio broadcasting at age 16, for Atlanta's WGST. Three years later, in 1933, he moved to New York City and was hired as a singer and straight man on The Eddie Cantor Show, then becoming a CBS Radio staff announcer.

Parks was the host of Break the Bank, which premiered on radio in 1945 and was telecast from 1948 to 1957, as well as Stop the Music on radio in 1948 and television from 1949 to 1952. The success of Stop the Music took a toll on the ratings of the popular radio show hosted by satirist Fred Allen, who began spoofing Parks's program with skits mocking the premise of the show, one called Cease The Melody.

With other celebrities, he hosted NBC radio's Monitor during the 1960s.

== Television ==
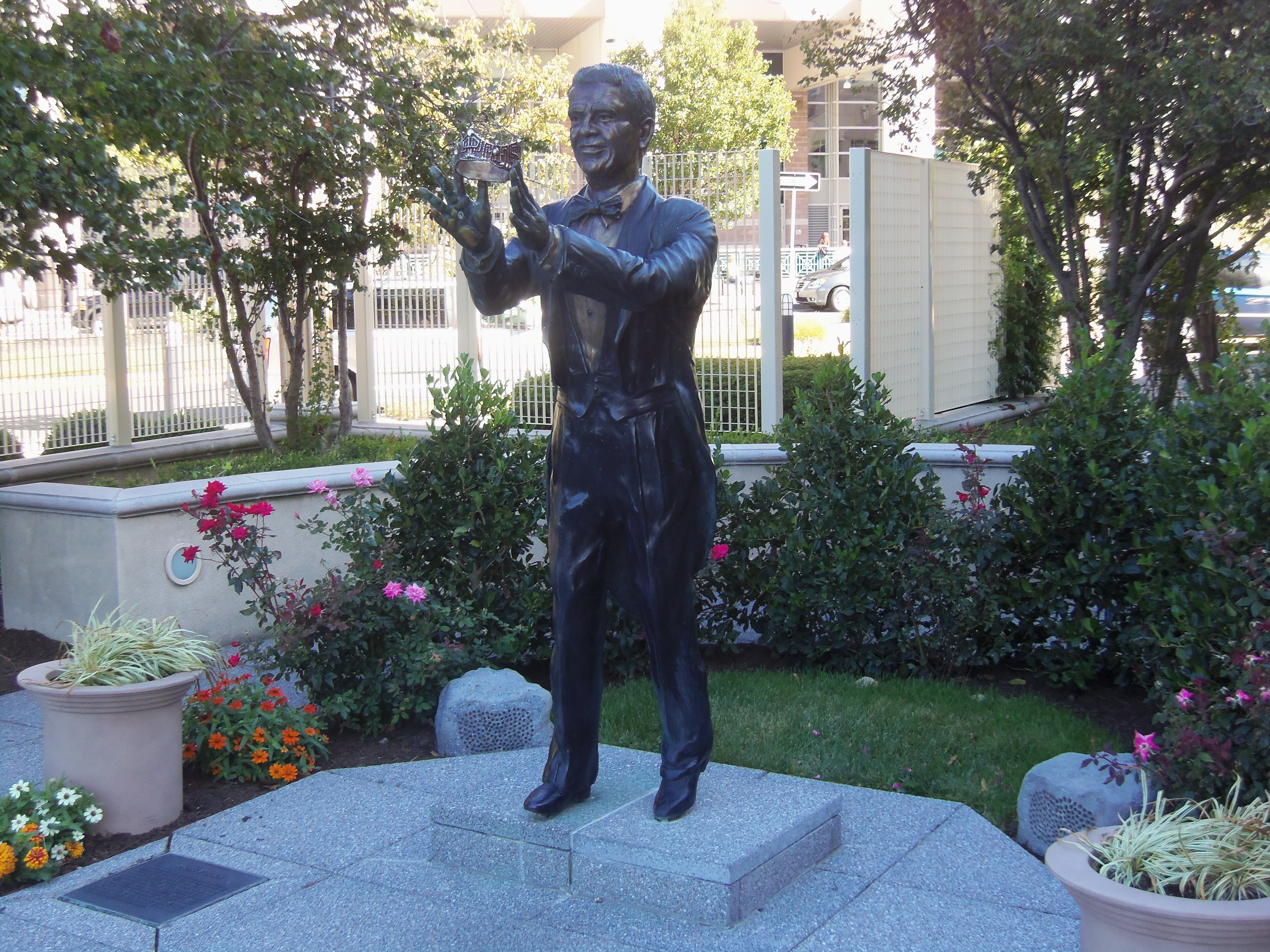
A statue of Bert Parks in Atlantic City commemorates his association with the Miss America pageant.

Parks's first game show was Party Line on NBC (broadcast from New York City NBC flagship station WNBT), which involved viewers calling in to answer questions and win $5 prizes; Party Line ran from June 8 to August 31, 1947, making its one surviving episode the oldest known game show and one of the oldest surviving television shows to have been recorded. Commercial kinescopes did not come out until fall 1947 (co-sponsored by NBC, DuMont, and Kodak), and the only kinescopes known to predate Party Line are a few episodes of Kraft Television Theater from February and June 1947.

Other games that Parks hosted in early television include Stop the Music (1949-52/1954-56), Double or Nothing (1952–54), Balance Your Budget (1952–53), Two in Love (1954), Giant Step (1956–57), Hold That Note (1957), Bid 'n' Buy (1958), County Fair (1958–59), Masquerade Party (1958–60), The Big Payoff (1959), Yours for a Song (1961–63), and the pilot for Hollywood Squares (April 21, 1965). His last game show hosting job was in 1968, on the pilot for a revival of Heatter-Quigley's The Celebrity Game; the show did not sell.

He also helmed a daytime variety show in 1950, The Bert Parks Show. It focused on "nighttime quality" entertainment in contrast to what was usually found on daytime TV at that time.

In addition, he also starred in a syndicated series called Circus! (featuring various circus acts from around the world) in the early 1970s. He appeared in Burkes Law S02E24. Parks also appeared in a 1976 episode of The Bionic Woman as the nefarious host of the "Miss United States" beauty pageant, involved in a plot to sell national security technology.

However, Parks is most famous for hosting the Miss America telecast from 1955 to 1979; each telecast ended with Parks singing "There She Is, Miss America", as the winner was crowned (in the aforementioned Bionic Woman episode, he sings a parody of the song for the episode's fictional pageant). Following the 1979 pageant, he was unceremoniously fired by the organization (he heard a newscast while on vacation) in an attempt to attract a more youthful audience. The Tonight Show host Johnny Carson led an on-air campaign to get Parks rehired, but was unsuccessful.

In 1990, for the 70th anniversary of the Miss America pageant (during which Miss America 1991 was crowned), Parks was brought on by host Gary Collins to sing "There She Is" to the new Miss America, Marjorie Judith Vincent. It was the last time Parks performed the song live.

His last-known television appearance, a Pepsi commercial, first aired in June 1991.

== Recordings ==
A recording of "There She Is, Miss America" as sung by Parks was used each year in the Miss America scholarship pageant until 2012 as the new reigning titleholder takes her walk down the runway in her newly earned crown. On September 13, 2015, the recording was reused for the 95th Anniversary of the Miss America pageant.

Parks did a take-off of his hosting role in The Freshman (1990), starring Marlon Brando, Matthew Broderick and Bruno Kirby. He played the emcee of a Gourmet Club dinner where guests supposedly eat a Komodo dragon, singing a spoof of "There She Is" in a salute to the soon-to-be-deceased dragon. Some of his other film appearances were in That's the Way of the World (1975) and The Great Balloon Adventure (1977).

Parks appeared on WKRP in Cincinnati in the 1980 episode "Herb's Dad", playing Herb Tarlek Sr. (father of series' regular Herb Tarlek Jr.). In 1988, Parks appeared on an episode of 227 as himself. He also made cameos as himself in a 1990 episode of Saturday Night Live hosted by Dennis Hopper, and a 1991 episode of Night Court.

== Death ==
Parks died of lung cancer at La Jolla, California, on February 2, 1992, at the age of 77.

Preceded by Bob Russell	Miss America host 1955-1979	Succeeded by Ron Ely
