= Miss Teen USA 1992 =

10th edition of the Miss Teen USA competition

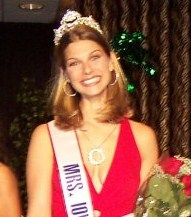
- 1992 Miss Teen USA Jamie Solinger (image as Mrs. Iowa America 2004)
- Date: August 25, 1992
- Presenters: Dick Clark; Leeza Gibbons; Bridgette Wilson
- Venue: Mississippi Coast Coliseum, Biloxi, Mississippi
- Broadcaster: CBS; WHLT
- Entrants: 50
- Placements: 12
- Withdrawals: District of Columbia
- Winner: Jamie Solinger; Iowa
- Congeniality: Amber Evans; New York
- Photogenic: Rachel Lee Adcock; North Carolina

Miss Teen USA 1992, the 10th anniversary of the Miss Teen USA pageant, was televised live from the Mississippi Coast Coliseum in Biloxi, Mississippi on 25 August 1992.

At the conclusion of the final competition, Jamie Solinger of Iowa was crowned by outgoing queen Janel Bishop of New Hampshire. Jamie is the first Miss Teen USA from Iowa. This marks the first (and so far only time) a candidate did not compete. In this case, Miss DC Teen USA was unable to go to Biloxi at the time being.

The pageant was hosted by Dick Clark for the third of four years, with color commentary by Leeza Gibbons in her third and final year, and Miss Teen USA 1990 Bridgette Wilson, for the only time. Music was provided by the Gulf Coast Teen Orchestra for the third consecutive year.

The final competition was forced to be held early because of the hurricane threat, and the contestants were then bused further inland. This was the first time in the pageant's ten-year history that the event was not broadcast live. During the pre-recorded competition the crownings of both Jamie Solinger and first runner-up Angela Logan were filmed in an attempt to keep the result secret until the eventual broadcast of the event. Angela was told one hour before the evening telecast that Solinger had won and that she was the first runner-up. The taping of two crownings became known as the "hurricane option" and would nearly be repeated at Miss Teen USA 1998 because of a live presidential address by Bill Clinton.

== Results ==
=== Placements ===
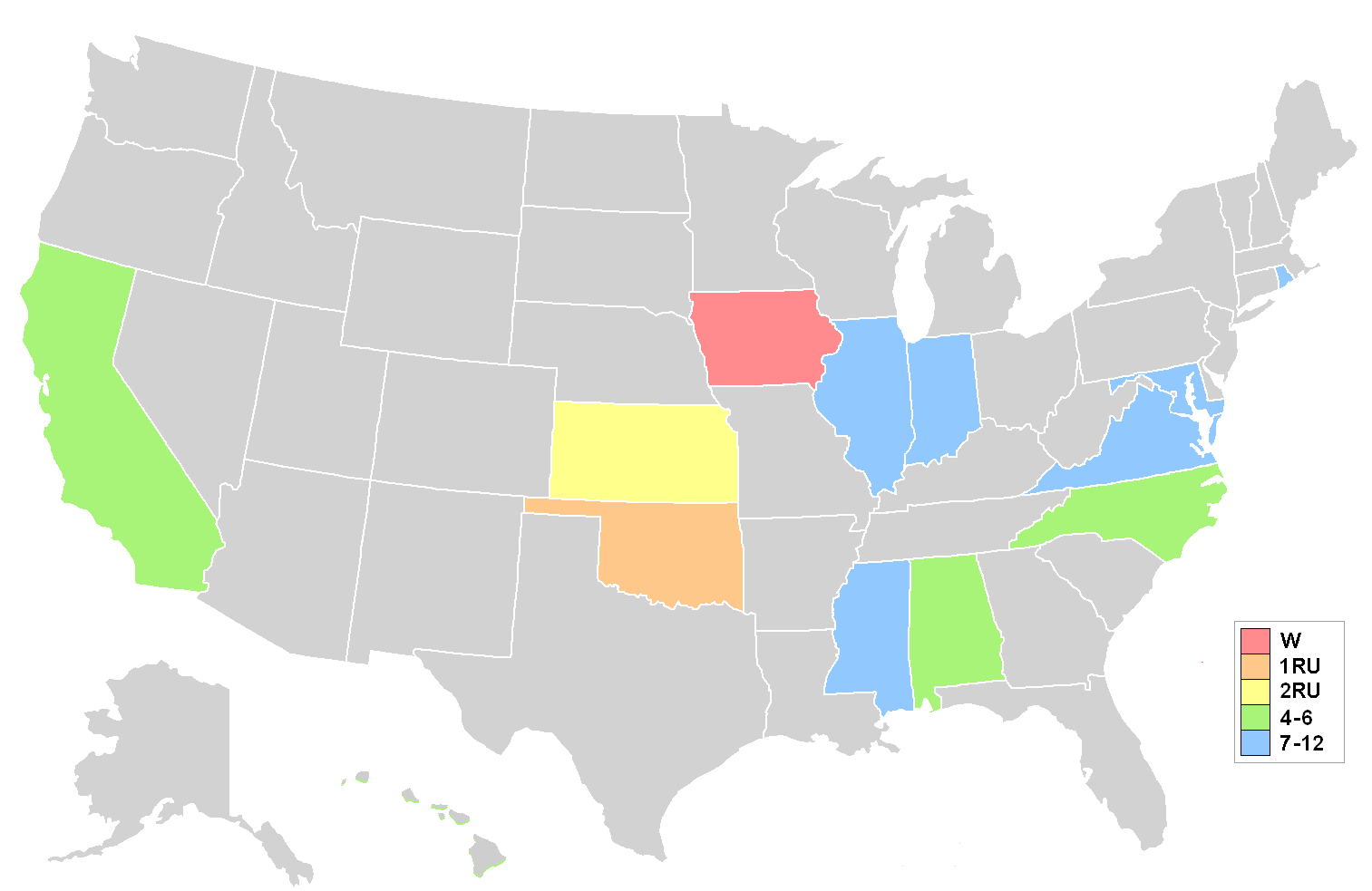
Miss Teen USA 1992 final placements

| Final results | Contestant |
|---|---|
| Miss Teen USA 1992 | Iowa – Jamie Solinger |
| 1st Runner-Up | Oklahoma – Angela Logan |
| 2nd Runner-Up | Kansas – Danielle "Danni" Boatwright |
| Top 6 | Alabama – Christine King; California – Natasha Allas; North Carolina – Rachel Lee Adcock |
| Top 12 | Illinois – Julee Kleffman; Indiana – Nicole Llewellyn; Maryland – Vanessa Malinis; Mississippi – Arleen McDonald; Rhode Island – Shanna Moakler; Virginia – Andrea Ballengee |

=== Special awards ===
| Award | Contestant |
| Miss Congeniality | New York – Amber Evans |
| Miss Photogenic | North Carolina – Rachel Lee Adcock |
| Best in Swimsuit | California – Natasha Allas |
| Most Beautiful Eyes | Wyoming – Dondi Bowman |
| Minolta Photo Contest | Colorado – Brandi Bryant |

=== Scores ===
| State | Swimsuit | Interview | Evening Gown | Average | Finalists |
|---|---|---|---|---|---|
| Iowa | 9.267 | 9.651 | 9.620 | 9.513 | 9.800 |
| Oklahoma | 9.226 | 9.309 | 9.487 | 9.341 | 9.586 |
| Kansas | 9.221 | 9.600 | 9.600 | 9.474 | 9.486 |
| Alabama | 9.010 | 9.326 | 9.449 | 9.262 | 9.471 |
| North Carolina | 9.079 | 9.207 | 9.500 | 9.262 | 9.400 |
| California | 9.340 | 9.514 | 9.486 | 9.447 | 9.400 |
| Rhode Island | 9.087 | 9.279 | 9.341 | 9.235 | |
| Maryland | 9.021 | 9.206 | 9.271 | 9.166 | |
| Indiana | 8.966 | 9.103 | 9.370 | 9.146 | |
| Virginia | 8.984 | 9.112 | 9.279 | 9.125 | |
| Mississippi | 8.917 | 9.200 | 9.247 | 9.121 | |
| Illinois | 8.897 | 8.969 | 9.286 | 9.050 | |

Legend
Winner
First runner-up
Second runner-up
Top 6 Finalist
Top 12 Semifinalist

== Host city ==
This was the third of five years that the pageant was held in Biloxi, and it was interrupted by the effects of Hurricane Andrew which devastated Florida and the Gulf Coast over the period the pageant was held.

Prior to the pageant, evacuation plans were in place for the pageant to evacuate to Mobile, Alabama or Jackson, Mississippi if weather conditions deteriorated.

The final competition was forced to be held early because of the hurricane threat, and the contestants were then bused further inland. This was the first time in the pageant's ten-year history that the event was not broadcast live. During the pre-recorded competition the crownings of both Jamie Solinger and first runner-up Angela Logan were filmed in an attempt to keep the result secret until the eventual broadcast of the event. Angela was told one hour before the evening telecast that Solinger had won and that she was the first runner-up. The taping of two crownings became known as the "hurricane option" and would nearly be repeated at Miss Teen USA 1998 because of a live presidential address by Bill Clinton.

== Delegates ==
The Miss Teen USA 1992 delegates were:

- Alabama - Christine King
- Alaska - Cindy Bridges
- Arizona - Heather Keckler
- Arkansas - Stacy Freeman
- California - Natasha Allas
- Colorado - Brandi Bryant
- Connecticut - Tiffany Selivonchik
- Delaware - Justine Jones
- Florida - Jennifer Sutter
- Georgia - Kristie Harmon
- Hawaii - Cameo DeCosta
- Idaho - Amanda Greenway
- Illinois - Julee Kleffman
- Indiana - Nicole Llewellyn
- Iowa - Jamie Solinger
- Kansas - Danielle "Danni" Boatwright
- Kentucky - Heather Bogess
- Louisiana - Evelyn Ellis
- Maine - Angela Walker
- Maryland - Vanessa Malinis
- Massachusetts - Victoria Grinder
- Michigan - WaLynda Sipple
- Minnesota - Elizabeth Peters
- Mississippi - Arleen McDonald
- Missouri - Robin Swain
- Montana - Aubrey Jo Hiller
- Nebraska - Marney Monson
- Nevada - Jennifer Gassmann
- New Hampshire - Angela Etter
- New Jersey - Lori Schmidt
- New Mexico - Hillary Matkin
- New York - Amber Evans
- North Carolina - Rachel Lee Adcock
- North Dakota - Juliette Spier
- Ohio - Tiffany Chaney
- Oklahoma - Angela Logan
- Oregon - Maggie Molstrom
- Pennsylvania - Tara Lavan
- Rhode Island - Shanna Moakler
- South Carolina - Shanen Pellerin
- South Dakota - Brandi Bower
- Tennessee - Angela Shoulders
- Texas - Carissa Blair
- Utah - Susan Kelly
- Vermont - Lisa Robie
- Virginia - Andrea Ballengee
- Washington - Kaley O'Kelley
- West Virginia - Kelly Humphrey
- Wisconsin - Trina Landowski
- Wyoming - Dondi Bowman
