= There She Is, Miss America =

Song written by Bernie Wayne for the Miss America pageant

Song by Bernie Wayne
- Written: 1954
- Released: September 11, 1955
- Genre: Theme song
- Songwriter: Bernie Wayne

"There She Is, Miss America" is a song written by songwriter Bernie Wayne for the Miss America pageant. It was first made famous in 1955 by master of ceremonies Bert Parks, who sang it every year until his firing in 1979. The song is sometimes referred to as "There She Is" or simply "Miss America."

== History ==
Bernie Wayne wrote "There She Is" in 1954 (while getting a haircut) for a show that aired on The Philco Television Playhouse called "The Miss America Story", starring Lee Meriwether and Johnny Desmond. Desmond introduced the song when Meriwether won the pageant. On September 11, 1955, Bert Parks, who was hired by the Miss America pageant to host the ceremonies, sang the song to Meriwether who won the pageant the previous year.

In 1977, the band Styx referenced the theme in their song "Miss America" from the album "The Grand Illusion".

In 1982, there was a disagreement over royalties with the Miss America pageant, which resulted in the song not being used again until 1985.

Bert Parks sang the song every year from 1955 until 1979 when he was dismissed from his duties. In 1980, pageant chairman Albert Mark, Jr fielded complaints regarding the decision to replace Parks. On account of the backlash from Parks being let go and the song's absence, the Miss America pageant attempted to entice Parks back to sing his song at the 1986 ceremonies, but he refused.

Host Gary Collins sang the song in 1990 at the show's end, and Parks appeared for the 70th anniversary and sang it to former winners. Parks died in 1992.

Other famous names in the industry were scouted to take over for Parks, but they all declined. Television host John Davidson even was quoted as saying: "I wouldn’t sing that lousy song for a million dollars". In his stead, Parks’ recording he made in 1955 singing "There She Is, Miss America" would still be featured on the show until 2012.

Wayne died in 1993. His widow brought suit against the pageant in 2013 for claims that they did not license the song for the 2011 and 2012 season. The suit was settled out of court without term disclosures. The song was not played in January 2013, and it was announced in May 2013 that it would not be played at future pageants.

In 2015, it was announced that the song would once again be performed to celebrate the crowning of Miss America 2016 with host Vanessa Williams.

== Other uses ==
- The Phil Silvers Show – (1956)
- I've Got a Secret – (November 27, 1961)
- The Hollywood Palace – Episode #3/33 (1966)
- The King of Marvin Gardens – (1972)
- All in the Family – Ep. "The Baby Contest" (1976) / "Edith Gets a Mink" (1972)
- Diff'rent Strokes - Ep. "The Senior Class Queen" (1984)
- Mr. Belvedere – Ep. "The Contract " (1985)
- Roger & Me – (1989)
- The Freshman – (1990)
- Seinfeld – Ep. "The Chaperone" (1994)
- Megamind – (2010)
- Black Mass – (2015)
- Casting JonBenet — (2017)

== Recordings ==
- Johnny Desmond – "Miss America!" – E.B. Marks Music Corp. (BMI) Record No. 9-61505 (1955)
- Bert Parks – "There She Is (Miss America) – (1955)
- Donny Osmond – "There She Is, Miss America – The Orchard Enterprises (2014)
