= Miss Universe 1956 =

5th Miss Universe pageant

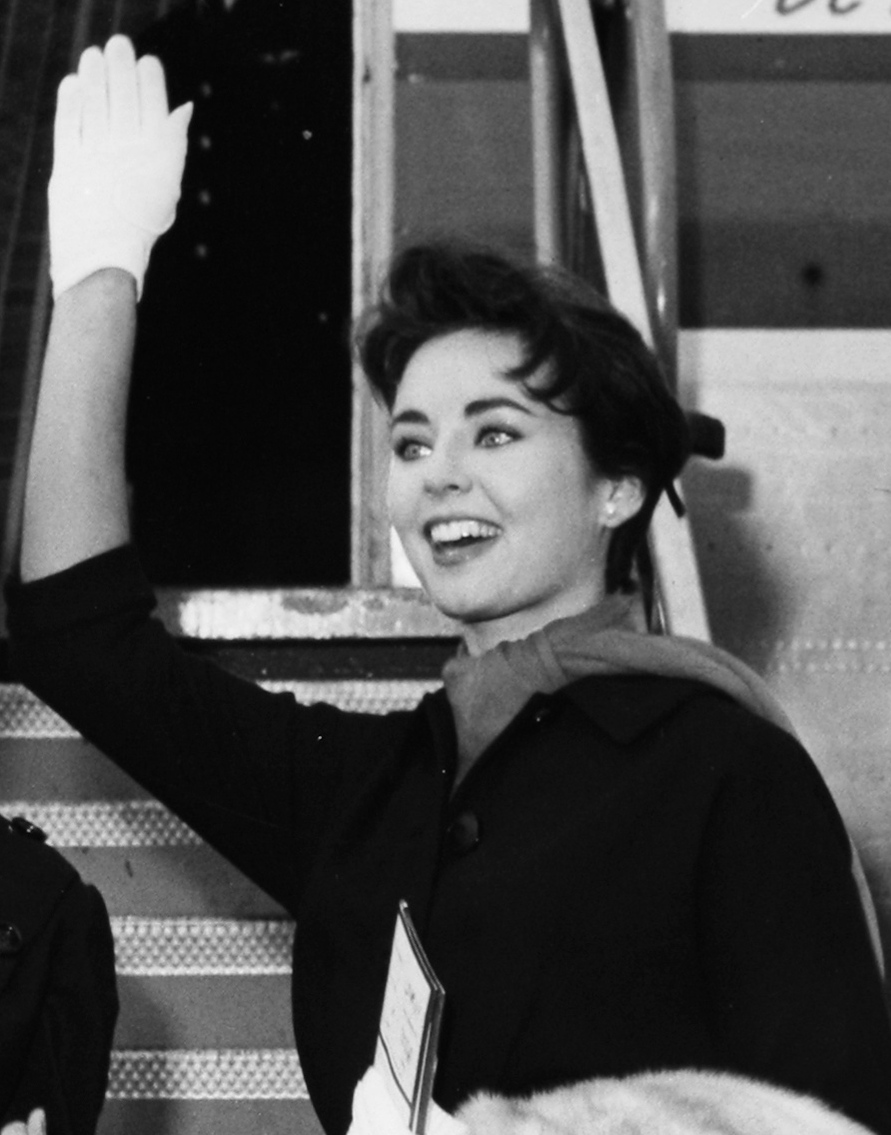
- Carol Morris
- Date: 20 July 1956
- Presenters: Bob Russell
- Venue: Long Beach Municipal Auditorium, Long Beach, California, United States
- Broadcaster: CBS
- Entrants: 30
- Placements: 15
- Debuts: British Guiana; Dominican Republic; Holland; Iceland
- Withdrawals: Ceylon; El Salvador; Finland; Honduras; Lebanon; Nicaragua; Norway; South Korea; West Indies
- Returns: Peru; Turkey
- Winner: Carol Morris; United States
- Congeniality: Anabella Granados (Costa Rica)
- Photogenic: Marina Orschel (West Germany)

Miss Universe 1956 was the fifth Miss Universe pageant, held at the Long Beach Municipal Auditorium in Long Beach, California, on 20 July 1956.

At the conclusion of the event, Hillevi Rombin of Sweden crowned Carol Morris of the United States as Miss Universe 1956. It is the second victory of the United States in the history of the pageant.

Contestants from thirty countries and territories competed in this edition. The pageant was hosted by Bob Russell for the fifth time.

== Background ==
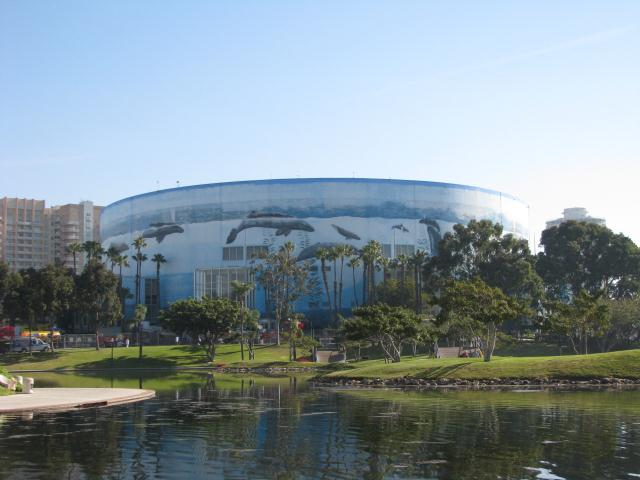
Long Beach Municipal Auditorium, the venue of Miss Universe 1956

=== Selection of participants ===
Contestants from thirty countries and territories were selected to compete in the pageant. This is the last edition before 2023 where women who are married and have children can participate. Two contestants were selected to replace the original dethroned winner.

==== Replacements ====
Guðlaug Guðmundsdóttir, the first runner-up of Miss Iceland 1956, was appointed to replace Miss Iceland 1956 Ágústa Guðmundsdóttir after it was discovered that the latter was already married. Edith Noble Nakpil was replaced by Isabel Escobar Rodriguez as the representative of the Philippines due to undisclosed reasons.

==== Debuts, returns, and withdrawals ====
This edition saw the debuts of the British Guiana, the Dominican Republic, Holland, and Iceland, and the returns of Turkey and Peru, which last competed in 1953 and 1954, respectively. Mirva Arvinen of Finland withdrew for undisclosed reasons. Ceylon, El Salvador, Honduras, Lebanon, Nicaragua, Norway, South Korea, and the West Indies withdrew after their respective organizations failed to hold a national competition or designate a contestant.

== Results ==
Miss Universe 1956 Top 15 semi-finalists together with Hillevi Rombin (center)

=== Placements ===
Placement	Contestant
Miss Universe 1956	United States – Carol Morris
1st Runner-Up	West Germany – Marina Orschel
2nd Runner-Up	Sweden – Ingrid Goude
3rd Runner-Up	England – Iris Waller
4th Runner-Up	Italy – Rossana Galli
Top 15	Argentina – Ileana Carré; Belgium – Lucienne Auquier; Brazil – Maria Cardoso; Cuba – Marcia Rodríguez; France – Anita Treyens; Greece – Rita Gouma; Israel – Sara Tal; Mexico – Erna Bauman; Peru – Lola Sabogal; Venezuela – Blanca Heredia

=== Special awards ===
Award	Contestant
Miss Friendship	Costa Rica – Anabella Granados
Miss Photogenic	West Germany – Marina Orschel
Miss Popular Girl	United States – Carol Morris

== Pageant ==
=== Format ===
Same with 1955, fifteen semi-finalists were chosen at the preliminary competition that consists of the swimsuit and evening gown competition. Each of the fifteen semi-finalists gave a short speech during the final telecast using their native languages. Afterwards, the fifteen semi-finalists paraded again in their swimsuits and evening gowns, and the five finalists were eventually chosen.

=== Selection committee ===
- Vincent Trotta – Artistic Director at Paramount Pictures
- James H. Noguer – American professor of Foreign Languages
- Tom Kelley – American photographer
- Dorothy Kirsten – American opera singer
- Earl Wilson – American journalist and columnist
- Alberto Vargas – Peruvian-American painter known for his "Vargas Girls"
- Max Factor – American businessman and make-up man
- Claude Berr – Founder and president of the Comité International Pour L'election de Miss Europe

== Contestants ==
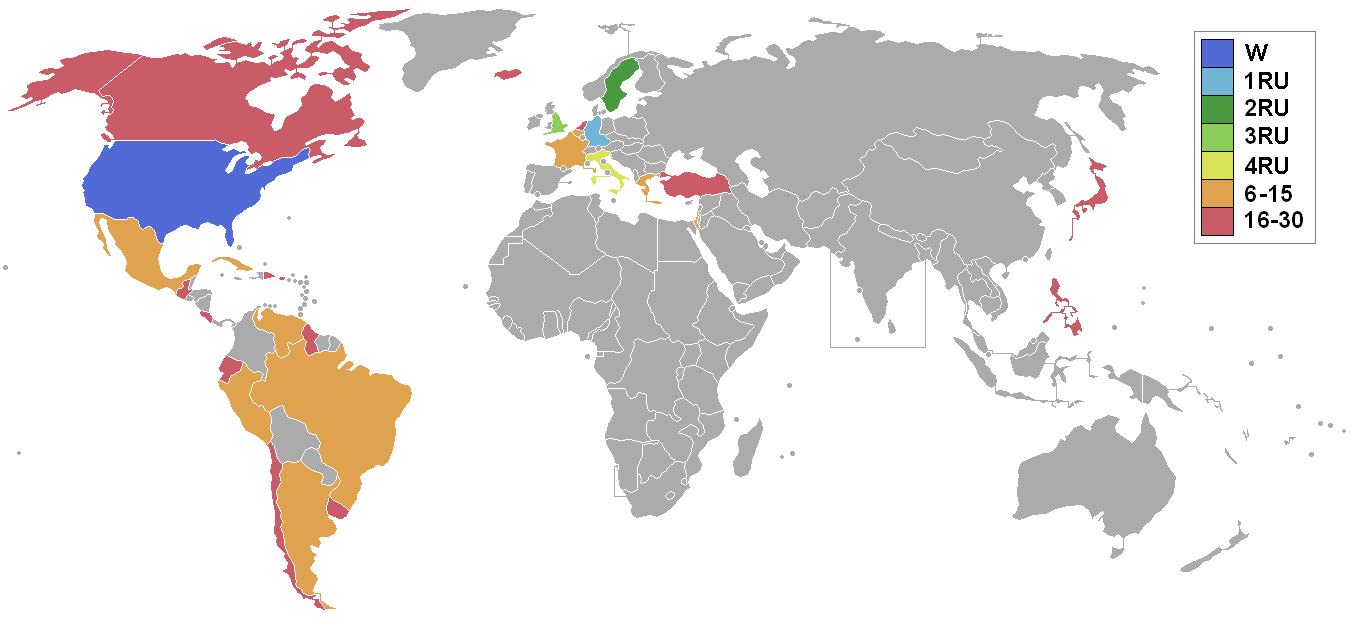
Miss Universe 1956 participating countries and territories.

Thirty contestants competed for the title.

Country/Territory	Contestant	Age (Note: Ages at the time of the pageant)	Hometown
Alaska	Barbara Sellar	18	Fairbanks
Argentina	Ileana Carré	19	Buenos Aires
Belgium	Lucienne Auquier	19	Brussels
Brazil	Maria Cardoso	21	Porto Alegre
British Guiana	Joan Fung	20	Georgetown
Canada	Elaine Bishenden	18	Toronto
Chile	Concepción Obach	20	Santiago
Costa Rica	Anabella Granados	18	Alajuela
Cuba	Marcia Rodríguez	19	Havana
Dominican Republic	Olga Fiallo	22	Ciudad Trujillo
Ecuador	Mercedes Flores	18	Guayaquil
England	Iris Waller	21	Gateshead
France	Anita Treyens	18	Paris
Greece	Rita Gouma	20	Athens
Guatemala	Ileana Garlinger	21	Guatemala City
Holland	Rita Schmidt	20	Alkmaar
Iceland	Guðlaug Guðmundsdóttir	19	Kópavogur
Israel	Sara Tal	22	Tel Aviv
Italy	Rossana Galli	21	Rome
Japan	Yoshie Baba	19	Aizuwakamatsu
Mexico	Erna Bauman	18	Mexico City
Peru	Lola Sabogal	21	Lima
Philippines	Isabel Rodriguez	19	Manila
Puerto Rico	Paquita Vivo	20	Santurce
Sweden	Ingrid Goude	19	Stockholm
Turkey	Can Uysaloğlu	18	Istanbul
United States	Carol Morris	20	Des Moines
Uruguay	Titina Aguirre	19	Montevideo
Venezuela	Blanca Heredia	22	Caracas
West Germany	Marina Orschel	19	Berlin
