= Carol Morris =

American actress, model and beauty queen (born 1936)

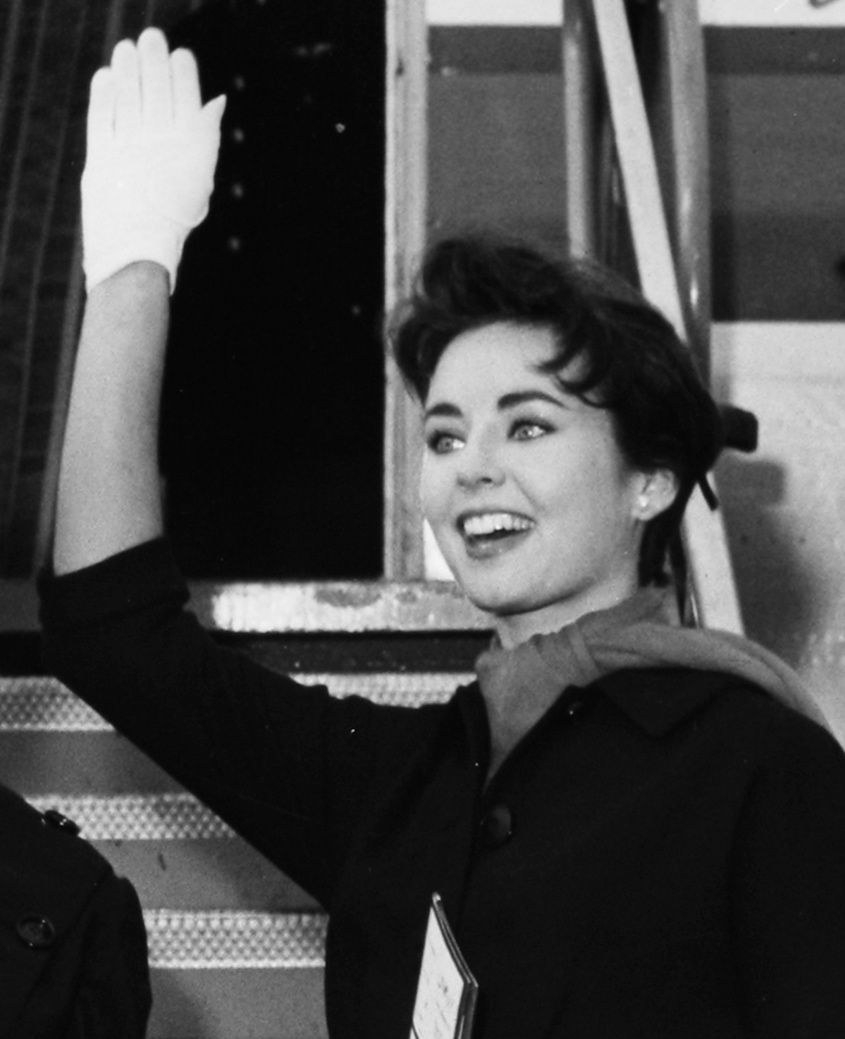
- Morris in Copenhagen in 1958
- Born: Carol Laverne Morris; April 8, 1936 (age 90); Omaha, Nebraska, U.S.
- Education: Drake University
- Height: 1.7 m (5 ft 7 in)
- Spouse: Edward Burke
- Beauty pageant titleholder
- Title: Miss Iowa 1954; Miss Iowa USA 1956; Miss USA 1956; Miss Universe 1956
- Hair color: Brown
- Eye color: Blue
- Major competitions: Miss Iowa 1954; (Winner); Miss America 1954; (Unplaced); Miss Iowa USA 1956; (Winner); Miss USA 1956; (Winner); Miss Universe 1956; (Winner)

Carol Ann Laverne Morris (born April 8, 1936) is an American actress, model and beauty queen who was the second Miss USA to win the Miss Universe title in the pageant's fifth edition in 1956. She was crowned by Hillevi Rombin, Miss Universe 1955, of Sweden.

== Early life ==
Morris was born in Omaha, Nebraska, as the only child of a minister. The family first moved to Scott City, Kansas, where she attended elementary school. After moving to Ottumwa, Iowa, Miss Morris attended Ottumwa High School where she graduated fourth in her class of 300. Morris was a champion swimmer and worked as a lifeguard, sang in the church choir, and played the violin. She attended Drake University in Des Moines, Iowa, where she was a member of the Beta Kappa chapter of Kappa Alpha Theta and a decorated swim team member.

== Career ==
Morris developed into a 5-foot 7-inch young woman weighing 131 pounds, with blue eyes and dark brown, almost black, hair, and a 36-25-36-inch figure. The first beauty pageant she entered and won was the Miss Ottumwa contest. Morris was in high school and was sponsored by the South Ottumwa Boosters Club. While attending Drake University she entered and won the Miss Iowa 1954 beauty contest. Morris then represented Iowa in the Miss America 1955 contest. In the talent portion of that competition she played the song Stardust on her violin.

Morris won the 1956 Miss USA contest that had 43 contestants and was held in Long Beach, California. She then competed and won against 29 contestants in the 1956 Miss Universe beauty pageant, also held in Long Beach. While reigning as Miss Universe Morris met Presidents Harry Truman and Herbert Hoover, and entertained U.S. troops with Bob Hope. She was also able to return home to the biggest celebration ever held in Ottumwa. A parade was organized in her honor, including Iowa's Governor Leo Hoegh and the four-foot-high Miss Universe trophy. In 1956 and 1957, she appeared as a mystery guest on What's My Line and To Tell the Truth, respectively. She appeared on ‘’The Adventures of Ozzie and Harriet’’ in episode 34 of season 5 “David Has a Date with Miss Universe” which aired May 22, 1957.

After completing her reign as Miss Universe Morris began an acting career. One of the awards for winning the Miss Universe title was a one-year movie contract. Her first film was Crazy Love with co-star Jeff Chandler. She acted in many films and TV shows. Morris's last role was in Paradise Alley produced in 1962, not to be confused with the more famous 1978 film of the same name

On June 30, 1959, in Chicago, Morris married 45-year-old Edward G. "Buzz" Burke, an "investor in oil wells" from Houston, Texas; they had become engaged the preceding Easter. A son, Christopher, was born in Houston on 18 April 1960. The couple then had two more children. Her husband died, and she then remarried and had one more child. She currently has one granddaughter. As of 2010 she was still living in Texas with her husband.

As of 2015, Morris was the only Miss Iowa USA to win the Miss USA crown. She is still active in the Miss Iowa USA pageant.

Awards and achievements
Preceded by (Sweden) Hillevi Rombin	Miss Universe; 1956	Succeeded by (Peru) Gladys Zender
