= Bob Russell (television presenter) =

American television personality (1908–1998)

Bob Russell (January 1, 1908 – January 24, 1998) was an American entertainer, best known for hosting the Miss America pageant during the years of 1940 to 1946, 1948 to 1950 and 1954. He also served as emcee for the Miss Universe, Miss World, and Miss Canada pageants.

== Biography ==
Bob Russell's father was a Russian-born baker. His family moved to New York at age nine and he began his career appearing in Broadway musicals in the 1920s. In the 1930s, he moved on to Philadelphia, where he became a local star as the singing master of ceremonies at the elegant Cafe Marguery in the old Adelphia Hotel.

In 1952, Russell co-created, directed and hosted the very first Miss Universe pageant in Long Beach, California, and continued with the pageant through 1957. When the Miss America pageant was first televised in 1954, Russell rejected the song "There She Is, Miss America" in favor of two of his own. His recommended replacement, Bert Parks, in 1955 sang this promenade tune into history. Lee Meriwether, age 19 from California, was crowned Miss America on September 11, 1954, by a panel of judges including movie queen Grace Kelly. It was watched by 27 million people.

Russell helped to start many early television game shows, such as Name That Tune (1954–59). He appeared as the emcee of Bonnie Maid's Versatile Varieties (1950–51) and Your Pet Parade (1951), and was the announcer on the quiz show Time Will Tell (1954). From May 1956 to September 1957, he hosted Stand Up and Be Counted,

Russell retired from the limelight to Sarasota, Florida, where he kept busy as Reservation Manager at the Aku Tiki Inn on Lido Key, and later at the Meadows Golf and Tennis Resort. Russell and his wife, Mignon Simpson Russell, had one child, a daughter named Ingrid.

== Musical performances ==
- Princess Flavia (November 2, 1925 – March 1926; 152 performances)

== TV shows ==
- Versatile Varieties (1949) – emcee, 1950–1951
- Live Like a Millionaire (1951)
- Your Pet Parade (1951) – host
- Name That Tune (1953) – co-creator
- Time Will Tell (1954) – announcer
- Stand Up and Be Counted 1956-1957, host
- Yours for a Song creator, aired on ABC from 1961–1963 hosted by Bert Parks

Preceded by NA	Miss America host 1940–1954	Succeeded by Bert Parks
