= Miss Universe Russia 2006 =

- Date: February 21, 2006
- Venue: Gostiny Dvor Arcade, Moscow
- Broadcaster: STS
- Entrants: 100
- Placements: 20
- Winner: Anna Litvinova; Novokuznetsk

Miss Universe Russia 2006, was held on February 21, 2006, at Gostiny Dvor Arcade. 100 women competed at the pageant where Anna Litvinova won representing the Novokuznetsk. This contest was made specifically to send a candidate to the Miss Universe for that same year. Candidates from all the Russian regions and cities came to compete for the title. This was the last occasion on which the Miss Universe Russia organization sent a candidate.

== Placement ==
Final results	Contestant
Miss Universe Russia 2006	Novokuznetsk - Anna Litvinova
1st Runner-up	Nenets Okrug - Anna Mezentseva
2nd Runner-up	Capital City - Alexandra Manzur
Top 5 Finalists	Ishim - Sveta Aksyonova; Udmurtia Republic - Vlada Shubin
Top 10 Quarter-finalists	Evenk Okrug - Katya Dyomina; Kirov City - Natalia Dezhneva; Leningrad Oblast - Svetlana Dezhnyova; Moscow Oblast - Sofia Leona; Yakutsk - Margarita Yursky
Top 20 Semi-finalists	Amur Oblast - Anastasia Batyrova; Arkhangelsk Oblast - Irina Maryina; Birobidzhan - Natasha Ruchyeva; Dmitrov - Maria Minayeva; Lobnya - Lera Vorobyeva; Mari El Republic - Anastasia Karpova; Orenburg City - Tatiana Zubova; Orenburg Oblast - Victoria Vyazova; Sverdlovsk Oblast - Galina Holodova; Yekaterinburg - Natalia Riazantseva

== Contestants ==
Represent	Candidate	Age	Height
Adygean Republic	Diana Izvitskaya	21	1.78 m (5 ft 10 in)
Agin-Buryat Okrug	Sasha Lisovskaya	18	1.79 m (5 ft 10 1/2 in)
Alexandrov	Anastasia Tolstaya	22	1.81 m (5 ft 11 1/2 in)
Altai Krai	Polina Bystraya	23	1.82 m (5 ft 11 1/2 in)
Amur Oblast	Anastasia Batyrova	22	1.76 m (5 ft 9 1/2 in)
Arkhangelsk Oblast	Irina Maryina	21	1.77 m (5 ft 9 1/2 in)
Astrakhan City	Alina Batischeva	19	1.81 m (5 ft 11 1/2 in)
Azov	Oksana Ruchyova	22	1.77 m (5 ft 9 1/2 in)
Barnaul	Arina Kachalova	19	1.75 m (5 ft 9 in)
Bashkortostan Republic	Sofia Tkacheva	20	1.79 m (5 ft 10 1/2 in)
Birobidzhan	Natasha Ruchyeva	18	1.76 m (5 ft 9 1/2 in)
Blagoveshchensk	Lena Tkachyova	19	1.82 m (5 ft 11 1/2 in)
Capital City	Alexandra Manzur	22	1.81 m (5 ft 11 1/2 in)
Chechen Republic	Valeria Shcherbitskaya	19	1.80 m (5 ft 11 in)
Chelyabinsk City	Kristina Kadyrova	24	1.78 m (5 ft 10 in)
Cherepovets	Darya Lebedeva	25	1.83 m (6 ft 0 in)
Chukotka Okrug	Yulia Berestova	19	1.80 m (5 ft 11 in)
Dmitrov	Maria Minayeva	23	1.79 m (5 ft 10 1/2 in)
Domodedovo	Kate Demina	23	1.83 m (6 ft 0 in)
Evenk Okrug	Katya Dyomina	22	1.82 m (5 ft 11 1/2 in)
Ingushetian Republic	Ann Semina	21	1.82 m (5 ft 11 1/2 in)
Irkutsk City	Ekaterina Syomina	26	1.76 m (5 ft 9 1/2 in)
Irkutsk Oblast	Svetlana Aksenova	26	1.83 m (6 ft 0 in)
Ishim	Sveta Aksyonova	23	1.79 m (5 ft 10 1/2 in)
Ivanovo Oblast	Alina Yeremina	25	1.79 m (5 ft 10 1/2 in)
Izhevsk	Helen Yeryomina	22	1.81 m (5 ft 11 1/2 in)
Kaliningrad Oblast	Nastya Neyolova	25	1.82 m (5 ft 11 1/2 in)
Kazan	Ksenia Pechyonkina	26	1.75 m (5 ft 9 in)
Kemerovo City	Maria Semyonova	22	1.82 m (5 ft 11 1/2 in)
Khabarovsk City	Irina Yolkina	23	1.82 m (5 ft 11 1/2 in)
Khanty-Mansi Okrug	Natalia Pechenkina	20	1.82 m (5 ft 11 1/2 in)
Khimki	Alexandra Neyelova	21	1.82 m (5 ft 11 1/2 in)
Kirov City	Natalia Dezhneva	18	1.80 m (5 ft 11 in)
Kolomna	Tanya Tsareva	25	1.77 m (5 ft 9 1/2 in)
Komi Republic	Daria Muravyova	18	1.76 m (5 ft 9 1/2 in)
Koryak Okrug	Lena Vorobyova	23	1.80 m (5 ft 11 in)
Krasnodar City	Elena Solovyova	23	1.80 m (5 ft 11 in)
Krasnoyarsk City	Olga Zharova	21	1.79 m (5 ft 10 1/2 in)
Kursk Oblast	Anastasia Kuzmina	19	1.83 m (6 ft 0 in)
Kyzyl	Julia Zhuravlyova	22	1.81 m (5 ft 11 1/2 in)
Leningrad Oblast	Svetlana Dezhnyova	21	1.76 m (5 ft 9 1/2 in)
Leninogorsk	Dasha Tsaryova	23	1.78 m (5 ft 10 in)
Lipetsk City	Kseniya Muravyeva	23	1.75 m (5 ft 9 in)
Lobnya	Lera Vorobyeva	22	1.78 m (5 ft 10 in)
Lyubertsy	Kseniya Zhilina	23	1.79 m (5 ft 10 1/2 in)
Magas	Anastasia Minina	20	1.83 m (6 ft 0 in)
Magnitogorsk	Anastasia Zeynalova	18	1.80 m (5 ft 11 in)
Mari El Republic	Anastasia Karpova	23	1.83 m (6 ft 0 in)
Mezhdurechensk	Yana Lyalina	18	1.79 m (5 ft 10 1/2 in)
Moscow Oblast	Sofia Leona	26	1.77 m (5 ft 9 1/2 in)
Murmansk Oblast	Anastasiya Borisova	19	1.78 m (5 ft 10 in)
Naberezhnye Chelny	Anastasia Golubeva	24	1.77 m (5 ft 9 1/2 in)
Nazran	Sasha Babich	18	1.81 m (5 ft 11 1/2 in)
Nefteyugansk	Olga Vavilova	23	1.75 m (5 ft 9 in)
Nenets Okrug	Anna Mezentseva	20	1.83 m (6 ft 0 in)
Nizhny Novgorod City	Irina Dorokhova	22	1.79 m (5 ft 10 1/2 in)
Nizhny Novgorod Oblast	Mary Gurjieva	23	1.78 m (5 ft 10 in)
North Ossetian Republic	Maria Berestova	26	1.75 m (5 ft 9 in)
Novokuznetsk	Anna Litvinova	23	1.81 m (5 ft 11 1/2 in)
Novosibirsk City	Masha Yeltsova	23	1.83 m (6 ft 0 in)
Noyabrsk	Alina Sergeyeva	24	1.81 m (5 ft 11 1/2 in)
Omsk City	Anastasiya Danilova	25	1.83 m (6 ft 0 in)
Omsk Oblast	Marina Guriyeva	26	1.75 m (5 ft 9 in)
Orekhovo-Zuyevo	Helen Aksenova	23	1.83 m (6 ft 0 in)
Orenburg City	Tatiana Zubova	23	1.76 m (5 ft 9 1/2 in)
Orenburg Oblast	Victoria Vyazova	19	1.82 m (5 ft 11 1/2 in)
Pavlovsky Posad	Kristina Mayorova	26	1.79 m (5 ft 10 1/2 in)
Penza City	Olga Zaikova	25	1.78 m (5 ft 10 in)
Perm City	Anastasia Donskoy	22	1.77 m (5 ft 9 1/2 in)
Primorsky Krai	Maria Lukina	21	1.77 m (5 ft 9 1/2 in)
Pushkino	Tatiana Nikonov	19	1.83 m (6 ft 0 in)
Rostov Oblast	Irina Zinchenko	26	1.77 m (5 ft 9 1/2 in)
Rostov-on-Don	Anastasia Pavlova	20	1.76 m (5 ft 9 1/2 in)
Ryazan City	Svetlana Svetlova	25	1.76 m (5 ft 9 1/2 in)
Saint Petersburg	Anna Teterin	21	1.75 m (5 ft 9 in)
Sakha Republic	Liza Urnov	26	1.76 m (5 ft 9 1/2 in)
Sakhalin Oblast	Kseniya Surikova	21	1.82 m (5 ft 11 1/2 in)
Samara City	Viktoria Alfyorova	24	1.80 m (5 ft 11 in)
Saratov City	Katherine Parfenova	22	1.75 m (5 ft 9 in)
Saratov Oblast	Lisa Trifonova	19	1.81 m (5 ft 11 1/2 in)
Sverdlovsk Oblast	Galina Holodova	25	1.82 m (5 ft 11 1/2 in)
Tambov Oblast	Irene Belykha	21	1.83 m (6 ft 0 in)
Tatarstan Republic	Vera Tsareva	26	1.76 m (5 ft 9 1/2 in)
Tolyatti	Valentina Yatskin	21	1.82 m (5 ft 11 1/2 in)
Tomsk City	Catherine Maltseva	24	1.80 m (5 ft 11 in)
Tyumen City	Elena Salnikova	26	1.76 m (5 ft 9 1/2 in)
Tyumen Oblast	Tatyana Shirokova	21	1.82 m (5 ft 11 1/2 in)
Udmurtia Republic	Vlada Shubin	18	1.75 m (5 ft 9 in)
Ufa	Nastia Bolshakova	22	1.80 m (5 ft 11 in)
Ulan-Ude	Mariya Schukin	23	1.76 m (5 ft 9 1/2 in)
Ulyanovsk City	Ulyana Schelokova	26	1.76 m (5 ft 9 1/2 in)
Vladivostok	Margarita Khruschev	19	1.79 m (5 ft 10 1/2 in)
Volgograd City	Karina Tischenko	18	1.75 m (5 ft 9 in)
Vologda Oblast	Natalya Lysenko	25	1.78 m (5 ft 10 in)
Voronezh City	Elizabeth Batyrova	22	1.82 m (5 ft 11 1/2 in)
Vyborg	Ulyana Ilyin	25	1.77 m (5 ft 9 1/2 in)
Yakutsk	Margarita Yursky	18	1.79 m (5 ft 10 1/2 in)
Yaroslavl City	Karina Bayanova	22	1.79 m (5 ft 10 1/2 in)
Yekaterinburg	Natalia Riazantseva	19	1.76 m (5 ft 9 1/2 in)
Yuzhno-Sakhalinsk	Alexandra Petrovsky	25	1.83 m (6 ft 0 in)
