= Lacie Lybrand =

American beauty pageant contestant (born 1982)

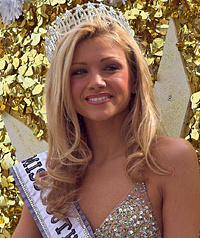
- Born: Lacie Lyn Lybrand; June 16, 1982 (age 44); Lexington, South Carolina, U.S.
- Height: 5 ft 7 in (1.70 m)
- Beauty pageant titleholder
- Title: Miss United States 2003; Miss South Carolina USA 2006
- Hair color: Blonde
- Eye color: Blue
- Major competition: Miss USA 2006 (top 10)

Lacie Lyn Lybrand (born June 16, 1982) is an American model and beauty queen from Lexington, South Carolina, who was the winner of the Miss United States 2003 pageant, held in New York City. Lybrand won the Miss South Carolina USA 2006 title in the state pageant held in late 2005. This was her second attempt for the title as she had previously placed in the top ten at the 2005 event won by Sarah Medley.

Lybrand represented South Carolina in the Miss USA 2006 pageant that was broadcast live from Baltimore, Maryland on April 21, 2006. She placed in the top ten of the nationally televised pageant and competed in the swimsuit and evening gown events. The competition was won by Tara Conner of Kentucky.

Lybrand was also one of twenty-six Miss USA delegates who appeared on Deal or No Deal in April 2006.

Lybrand graduated from Lexington High School in 2000 and worked at SCANA, a public utility company, while still attending high school. She is a student at Midlands Technical College. Lybrand is a customer relations specialist and also pursues modeling. In 2006, she was selected to be the cover model for Supermodels Unlimited Magazine.

Preceded by Sarah Medley	Miss South Carolina USA; 2006	Succeeded by Ashley Zais
