= Miss Kentucky Teen USA =

Beauty pageant competition

- Formation: 1983; 43 years ago
- Type: Beauty pageant
- Headquarters: Cincinnati
- Location: Ohio
- Members: Miss Teen USA
- Official language: English
- Key people: Melissa Proctor-Pitchford, state pageant director
- Website: Official website

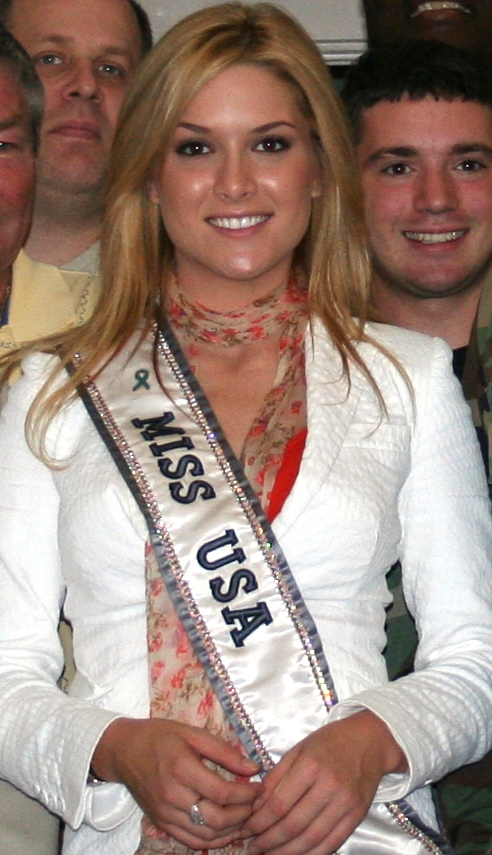
Tara Conner, Miss Kentucky Teen USA 2002, Miss Kentucky USA 2006 & Miss USA 2006

The Miss Kentucky Teen USA competition is the pageant that selects the representative for the state of Kentucky in the Miss Teen USA pageant.

Although Kentucky has not produced a Miss Teen USA titleholder, five delegates have placed as Top 5 or Top 6: Krista Keith in 1983, Kristi Dawn Hicks in 1989, April Vaughn in 1990, Kristen Johnson in 2000 and Tara Conner in 2002. Their most recent placement was Taylor Hubbard who placed in the Top 15 in 2010.

Taylor Moore of Louisville was appointed Miss Kentucky Teen USA 2026 on June 30, 2026, after the open casting call from Thomas Brodeur, the new owner of the national pageant. She will represent Kentucky at Miss Teen USA 2026.

== Eligibility ==
The participant must be single, legally recognized female, between the ages of fourteen and eighteen years old. Specifically, the contestant has to be under nineteen years old before January 1 of the pageant year. Also, the applicant must have never been married, pregnant, or had a marriage annulled. A contestant can only be eligible if she is a United States citizen and remains a United States citizen throughout the competition at both a state and national level. She must have lived in the state she desires to compete in permanently, at least six months prior to the pageant date, or be a full-time student in the state with one semester completed by December 31 of the pageant year.

== Results summary ==
=== Placement at Miss Teen USA ===
- 1st runner-up: Kristi Dawn Hicks (1989)
- 2nd runners-up: Krista Keith (1983), Kristen Johnson (2000), Tara Conner (2002)
- Top 6: April Vaughn (1990)
- Top 10: Lexie Kemper (1999), Amanda Nunnelley (2003)
- Top 12: Brittany Johnson (1995)
- Top 15: Sarah Withers (2005), Jefra Bland (2009), Taylor Hubbard (2010)

Kentucky holds a record of 11 placements at Miss Teen USA.

=== Awards ===
- Miss Photogenic: Lexie Kemper (1999), Kristen Johnson (2000)

== Winners ==
- Declared as Winner
- Ended as runner-up
- Ended as one of the finalists or semifinalists

Year	Name	Hometown	Age^{1}	Local title	Placement at Miss Teen USA	Special awards at Miss Teen USA	Notes
2026	Taylor Moore	Louisville	18	Miss Pikeville Teen			2nd runner-up at Miss Kentucky Teen USA 2025
2025	Reese Burt	Lexington	19	Miss Keeneland Teen			Top 17 at Miss Kentucky Teen USA 2022; 1st runner-up at Miss Kentucky Teen USA 2023; 3rd runner-up at Miss Kentucky Teen USA 2024
2024	Karlie Holmen	Gilbertsville	17	Miss Purchase District Teen			
2023	MéShyia Bradshaw	Elizabethtown	17	Miss Hardin County Teen			Participated in Miss Kentucky Teen USA 2022
2022	Gabriella Hembree	Carrollton	19	Miss Two Rivers City Teen			Participated at Miss Kentucky Teen USA 2020; Top 16 at Miss Kentucky Teen USA 2021; Top 10 at Miss Kentucky USA 2025
2021	Kennedy Mosley	London	17	Miss London Teen			2nd runner-up at Miss Tennessee USA 2024; 5th runner-up at Miss Kentucky USA 2025; Top 15 at Miss North Carolina USA 2025
2020	Mattie Barker	Louisville	18	Miss Southern Kentucky Teen			Participated at Miss Kentucky Teen USA 2018; Later Miss Kentucky USA 2025; 1st runner-up at Miss Tennessee USA 2025
2019	Emma Johns	Pikeville	17	Miss Pikeville Teen			
2018	Jordan Lynn Crozier	Somerset	19	Miss Pulaski County Teen			Top 16 at Miss Kentucky USA 2020; Participated at Miss Kentucky USA 2024
2017	Olivia Monet Prewitt	Danville	18	Miss Danville Teen			
2016	Christiaan Prince	Grayson	15	Miss Carter County Teen			
2015	Caroline Grace Ford	Bowling Green	18	Miss South Central Teen			3rd runner-up at Miss Kentucky's Outstanding Teen 2014; 3rd runner-up at Miss Kentucky Teen USA 2014
2014	Megan Ann Ducharm	Shelbyville	18	Miss Shelby County Teen			1st runner-up at Miss Kentucky Teen USA 2013
2013	Rebekah Grace "Gracie" Sapp	Lexington	15	Miss Fayette County Teen			
2012	Tiffany Marie Cline	Georgetown	14	Miss Scott County Teen			
2011	Stephanie Tyler Jones	Elizabethtown	17				1st runner-up at Miss Kentucky Teen USA 2010; 1st runner-up at Miss Kentucky USA 2014
2010	Taylor J. Hubbard	London	15		Top 15		Top 10 at Miss Kentucky USA 2015
2009	Jefra Kaysi Bland	Campbellsville	19		Top 15		Later contestant on Survivor: Cagayan; Participated at Miss Kentucky 2010
2008	Shannen Reil	West Van Lear	15				
2007	Katrina Marie Giannini	Princeton	17				2nd runner-up at Miss Kentucky USA 2012; Top 10 at Miss Kentucky USA 2014; Top 10 at Miss Indiana USA 2015
2006	Tiffany Rachelle Withrow	Ashland	17				
2005	Sarah Bryan Withers	Columbia	18		Top 15		
2004	Megan Ann Frank	Greensburg	19				
2003	Amanda Gene Nunnelley	Louisville	17		Top 10		2nd runner-up at Miss Kentucky Teen USA 2002; 4th runner-up at Miss Kentucky USA 2006
2002	Tara Elizabeth Conner	Russell Springs	16		2nd runner-up	Body Glove Swimsuit Award	Later Miss Kentucky USA 2006; Miss USA 2006; 4th runner up at Miss Universe 2006
2001	Katherine Sloan Faulkner	Hazard	17				1st runner-up at Miss Kentucky Teen USA 2000
2000	Kristen Lynn Johnson	Slaughters	18		2nd runner-up	Miss Photogenic	Later Miss Kentucky USA 2005; 2nd runner up at Miss USA 2005
1999	Vanessa Alexis "Lexie" Kemper	Louisville	17		Top 10	Miss Photogenic	3rd runner-up at Miss Kentucky Teen USA 1998; 1st runner-up at Miss Kentucky USA 2001
1998	Elizabeth Ann "Lizzie" Arnold	Columbia	18				Later Miss Kentucky USA 2002
1997	Kelli Jones	Benton	18				1st runner-up at Miss Kentucky USA 2002
1996	Kelly Marie Sodan	Berea	16				
1995	Brittany Lea Johnson	Virgie	18		Top 12		
1994	Crystal Beth Hayden	Paducah	17				
1993	Holly Renee Riggs	Paducah	18				
1992	Heather Jeanette Boggess	Paducah	17				
1991	Christine Jenny Jackman	Jeffersontown	18				
1990	Jennifer April Vaughn	Georgetown	17		Top 6		
1989	Kristie Dawn Hicks	Bardstown	17		1st runner-up		Later Miss Kentucky 1995
1988	Martha Elizabeth "Marti" Hendricks	Danville	18				
1987	Tracy Starr Marsee	Middlesboro	15				Participated in Miss Kentucky USA 1993
1986	Amy Miller	Benton	17				
1985	Leigh Ann Gregory	Lexington	15				
1984	Susan Bane "Suzy" Neclerio	Georgetown	17				
1983	Krista Kalaine Keith	Edgewood	15		2nd runner-up		

^{1} Age at the time of the Miss Teen USA pageant
