= Kristi Capel =

American television newscaster

Kristi Marie Capel (born July 7, 1983) is a television newscaster from Springfield, Missouri.

== Pageants and education ==
Capel is a native of Florence, Kentucky who later moved to Missouri. She competed in the Miss Missouri USA pageant in late 2005 and won. She had placed in the top fifteen of the Miss Kentucky USA pageant the year previous. Capel represented Missouri in the Miss USA 2006 pageant in Baltimore, Maryland in April 2006, in which she did not place.

Capel graduated from Heritage Academy (a parochial school affiliated with the Assemblies of God) in Kentucky in 2001. She won a volleyball scholarship to Evangel University, a religious school affiliated with the Assemblies of God, where she completed a Bachelor of Science degree in Broadcasting and Public Relations with honors in 2005.

== Career ==
She was recently employed as a television reporter, co-anchor and weekend weather anchor on ABC affiliate KSPR Springfield 33 News. Capel also worked as a radio personality at 99 Hit FM and 1340 AM KADI during much of 2006.

In January 2008, Capel accepted a job as a weather forecaster for the television station WBRE-TV in Wilkes-Barre, Pennsylvania. She moved to WJW (TV) in Cleveland on January 7, 2011. In January 2012, Capel was named Morning Co-Anchor of Fox 8 News in Morning, she replaced Tracy McCool who went to anchor Fox 8 News at 5PM.

On February 23, 2015, Capel made headlines for using the term "jigaboo" in reference to Lady Gaga's performance at the 87th Academy Awards. Lady Gaga performed a tribute to Julie Andrews and The Sound of Music, with a medley of songs from the film. Of Lady Gaga's performance, Capel remarked, "Lady Gaga surprising a lot of people last night with this tribute to Sound of Music," and added that actress Julie Andrews called it "wonderful." Capel went on to say "It's hard to really hear her voice with all the jigaboo music — whatever you want to call it — jigaboo." "She has a gorgeous voice. I never knew." After the nature of the term as a racial slur was noted online, Capel apologized. She claimed ignorance of the word, later tweeting, "I apologize if I offended you, I had no idea it was a word or what it meant. Thank you for watching."

Fox 8 news director Andy Fishman responded to the controversy saying, "Kristi apologized on the air shortly after making the remark. She did not know what the word meant but that is no excuse for using it," Fishman also said, "We have spoken with her and are confident nothing like this will happen again."

Preceded by Andrea Ciliberti	Miss Missouri USA; 2006	Succeeded by Amber Seyer
