= Binibining Pilipinas 2006 =

- Date: March 4, 2006
- Presenters: Dingdong Dantes; Dennis Trillo; Pia Guanio
- Entertainment: Cueshé; Alfred Vargas; Dion Ignacio; Andrew Wolff; Jeremy Marquez
- Venue: Araneta Coliseum, Quezon City, Philippines
- Broadcaster: GMA Network (local); GMA Pinoy TV (international)
- Entrants: 24
- Placements: 10
- Winner: Lia Andrea Ramos; Davao City
- Congeniality: Mylene Maligaya; Muntinlupa
- Photogenic: Lia Andrea Ramos; Davao City

Binibining Pilipinas 2006 was the 43rd edition of Binibining Pilipinas. It took place at the Smart Araneta Coliseum in Quezon City, Metro Manila, Philippines on March 4, 2006.

At the end of the night, Gionna Cabrera crowned Lia Andrea Ramos as Binibining Pilipinas Universe 2006, Carlene Aguilar crowned Anna Maris Igpit as Binibining Pilipinas-World 2006 and Precious Lara Quigaman crowned Denille Lou Valmonte as Binibining Pilipinas International 2006. Rosalyn Santiago was named First Runner-Up and Jeanne Bernadette Bello was named 2nd Runner-Up.

== Results ==
=== Placements ===
Color keys

- The contestant did not place but won a Special Award in the pageant.
- The contestant did not place.

Placement	Contestant	International Placement
Binibining Pilipinas Universe 2006	Bb. #17 – Lia Andrea Ramos	Miss Photogenic – Miss Universe 2006
Binibining Pilipinas World 2006	Bb. #20 – Anna Maris Igpit	Unplaced – Miss World 2006
Binibining Pilipinas International 2006	Bb. #9 – Denille Lou Valmonte	Unplaced – Miss International 2006
1st Runner-Up	Bb. #11 – Rosalyn Sirikit Santiago	
2nd Runner-Up	Bb. #21 – Jeanne Bernadette Bello	
Top 10	Bb. #5 – Khristine Marie Lim; Bb. #10 – Fiona Marie Lava; Bb. #13 – Marie-Ann Umali; Bb. #18 – Mary Pilar de Gorostiza; Bb. #22 – Caroline Yorke	

=== Special awards ===
Award	Contestant
Miss Talent	Bb. #21 – Jeanne Bernadette Bello
Miss Friendship	Bb. #4 – Mylene Maligaya
Miss Photogenic	Bb. #17 – Lia Andrea Ramos
Best in Swimsuit	Bb. #17 – Lia Andrea Ramos
Best in Long Gown	Bb. #20 – Anna Maris Igpit
Philippine Airlines Sunniest Personality	Bb. #17 – Lia Andrea Ramos
Miss Beautiful Hair	Bb. #17 – Lia Andrea Ramos
Smart Texter's Choice	Bb. #11 – Rosalyn Santiago
Manila Bulletin Reader's Choice Award	Bb. #7 – Louise Navera

== Contestants ==
24 contestants competed for the three titles.

No.	Contestant	Age	Hometown
1	Shiela Joy Pineda	22	Batangas
2	Joana Patricia Tolentino	22	Pasig
3	Marie Anne Kathleen Labung	20	Bacolor, Pampanga
4	Mylene Maligaya	18	Muntinlupa
5	Khristine Marie Alba Lim	22	San Mateo, Rizal
6	Jenny Yu	22	Angeles, Pampanga
7	Louise Dianne Navera	19	Pasay
8	Vanessa Anne Kibanoff	23	Arayat, Pampanga
9	Denille Lou Valmonte	24	Quezon City
10	Fiona Marie Lava	23	Pasig
11	Rosalyn Santiago	25	Nueva Ecija
12	Meral Ates	18	Pasig
13	Marie-Ann Umali	19	Batangas City
14	Jessica Joy Coria	18	Olongapo City
15	Kareen Amanda Donor	23	Quezon City
16	Emcel Alna Reyes	18	Angono, Rizal
17	Lia Andrea Ramos	25	Davao City
18	Mary Pilar de Gorostiza	21	Parañaque
19	Allia Hanelene Faytaren	18	Batangas City
20	Anna Maris Igpit	18	Bohol
21	Jeanne Bernadette Bello	22	Cavite
22	Caroline Yorke	19	Quezon City
23	Christina Mosqueda	20	Batangas City
24	Vera Eumee Ritter	19	Baguio
25	Aeesha Christine Rand	withdrew	
26	Mayumi Keller	withdrew	

== Notes ==
=== Post-pageant notes ===
- Lia Andrea Ramos competed at Miss Universe 2006 in Los Angeles, California but was unplaced. However, Ramos won the Miss Photogenic award. She is currently the head of the Women Empowerment Committee for the Miss Universe Philippines Organization.
- Anna Maris Igpit competed at Miss World 2006 in Warsaw but was unplaced. Denille Lou Valmonte was also unplaced when she competed at Miss International 2006 in Beijing.
- Marie-Ann Umali competed again at Binibining Pilipinas 2009, where she was crowned as Binibining Pilipinas World 2009. She competed at Miss World 2009 in Johannesburg but was unplaced.
