= Tamiko Nash =

American beauty pageant contestant

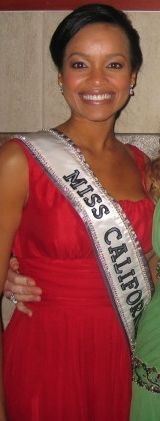
- Born: Tamiko Pleshette Nash; Los Angeles, California, U.S.
- Height: 1.66 m (5 ft 5 in)
- Spouse: Terrell Davis
- Beauty pageant titleholder
- Title: Miss California USA 2006
- Hair color: Black
- Eye color: Brown
- Major competitions: Miss California USA 2006 (winner); Miss USA 2006 (1st runner-up)

Tamiko Pleshette Nash is an American actress, television host, model and beauty queen who has competed in the Miss USA 2006.

Nash won the Miss California USA pageant in 2005, becoming only the third African American to hold the title. She went on to place first runner-up in the Miss USA 2006 pageant.

Nash has previously been employed by The Recording Academy, known for the Grammy Awards and is currently working as an actress in the Los Angeles area. Nash was a model on the television series The Price Is Right from 2007 to 2008.

Nash passed on her crown to Meagan Tandy in October 2006.

== Pageantry ==
Nash won the Miss California USA 2006 title in the state pageant held in Palm Springs, California, in September 2005. She won the crown on her first attempt and was only the third African American to hold the title.

Nash represented California in the Miss USA 2006 pageant broadcast live from Baltimore, Maryland, in April 2006. She placed first-runner up to Tara Conner of Kentucky, the second consecutive delegate from California to reach this position. Brittany Hogan, Miss California USA 2005, was first runner-up to Chelsea Cooley of North Carolina in 2005.

Prior to the announcement of the winner, eventual winner Tara Conner and Nash shared a long embrace, whilst Conner whispered to Nash. It was later revealed on an E! special that Conner, believing Nash had won, was wishing her luck for her reign as Miss USA and her participation at Miss Universe. The traditional statement declaring that if, for any reason the new titleholder cannot fulfill her reign, the first runner-up will take over was then read. Following this, a shocked Conner was announced as the winner.

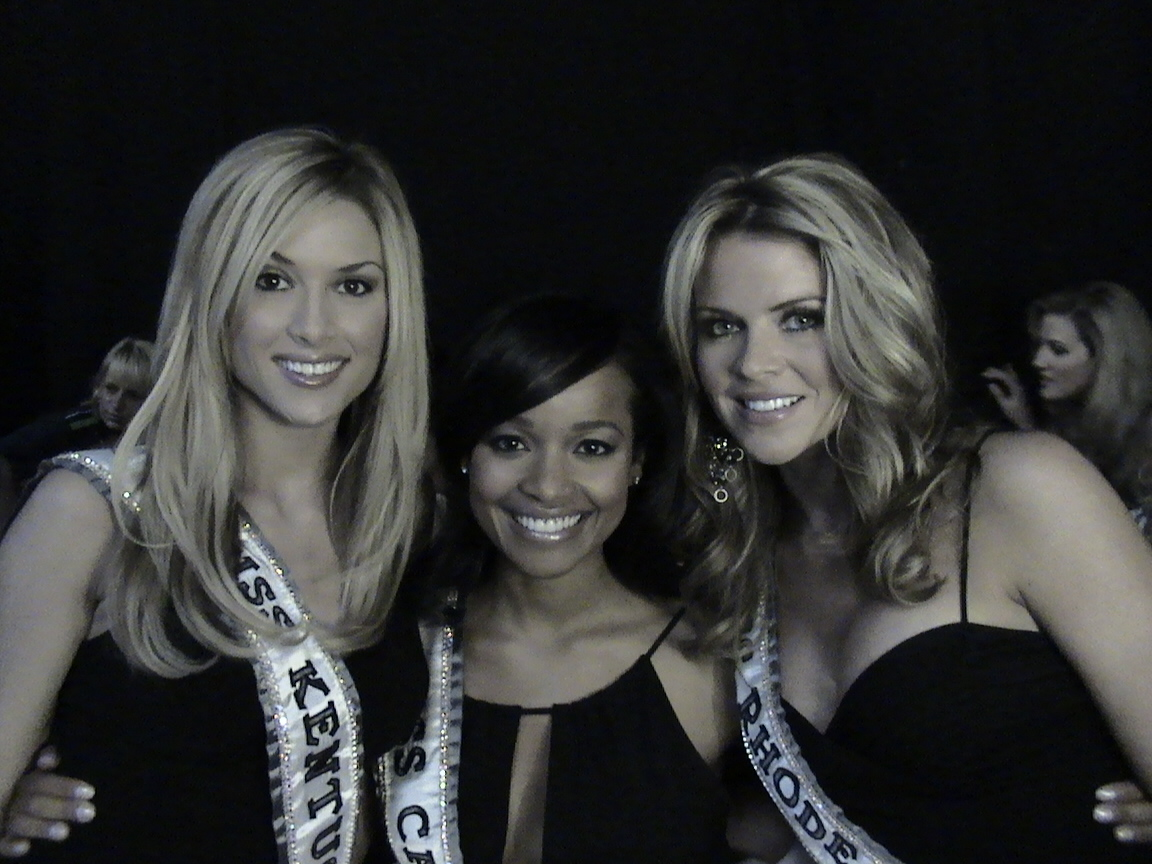
Nash (center) during the Deal or No Deal taping. Tara Conner, who later won the Miss USA title, is on Nash's left; Leeann Tingley, who placed in the top ten, is on her right. This image distorts their true heights, as Nash is slightly taller than Conner.

Nash was also one of twenty six Miss USA delegates who appeared on Deal or No Deal in April 2006. After the Miss USA pageant, she appeared as one of the feature delegates in an E! special: Hidden Lives of Miss USA.

=== Controversy surrounding Tara Conner ===
On December 14, 2006, controversy erupted when TMZ.com published an article stating that Tara Conner, Miss USA 2006, might be dethroned for unacceptable behavior in several New York City bars. According to a report, sources told TMZ.com that Conner is "out of control" and needs to go. If Conner was to be dethroned, Nash, as her first runner-up, would inherit the rest of her reign as Miss USA 2006.

Executives from both the pageant, including Donald Trump, and its broadcaster, NBC, met Tuesday to discuss whether to release Conner from her duties. The Miss Universe Organization released a statement saying that Conner had not been dethroned and that they and Trump would be "evaluating her behavioral and personal issues" and would make an announcement within the week.

On December 15, TMZ reported that Conner would be stripped of her crown, and that Nash would become Miss USA. However this was not the case. Trump forgave Conner and allowed her to retain the crown.

== Personal life ==
Nash currently works as an actress and host in the Los Angeles area. She is president of The Shine Foundation, which is dedicated to empowering young women. She appeared wearing her "Miss California USA" sash on the Green Carpet at the Grammys, and has since made appearances at the Camden House of Beverly Hills Grand Opening, the NAACP Image Awards, and other red carpet events.

Nash graduated from Notre Dame Academy in Los Angeles, CA in 1997. She earned her B.S. in Child and Family Development from San Diego State University in 2002 and has since served as an elementary school teacher at Birdrock Elementary in La Jolla, CA.

Nash volunteers her time with a number of non-profit organizations, including Domestic Violence Family Crisis Centers. She enjoys cooking, spending time with her family, reading and fitness/working out.

Nash married former NFL Hall of Fame player Terrell Davis in September 2009 and they have two sons, Jackson and Myles, and one daughter, Dylan.

== Notes ==
Awards and achievements
Preceded by (California) Brittany Hogan	Miss USA 1st runner-up 2006	Succeeded by (Rhode Island) Danielle Lacourse
Preceded by Brittany Hogan	Miss California USA; 2006	Succeeded by Meagan Tandy
