= Miss Universe Malaysia 2007 =

- Date: 21 April 2007
- Venue: Mines Resort, Selangor
- Broadcaster: Astro Hitz
- Entrants: 16
- Placements: 8
- Winner: Adelaine Chin; Sarawak
- Miss Congeniality: Caroline (Sabah)

Miss Malaysia Universe 2007, the 41st edition of the Miss Universe Malaysia, was held on 21 April 2007 at Mines Resort, Selangor. Adelaine Chin of Sarawak was crowned by the outgoing titleholder, Melissa Tan of Malacca at the end of the event. She then represented Malaysia at the Miss Universe 2007 pageant in Mexico City, Mexico.
