= Desiree Durán =

Bolivian model and pageant contestant

- Born: María Desiree Durán Morales; October 7, 1985 (age 41); Santa Cruz de la Sierra, Bolivia
- Occupation: Model
- Beauty pageant titleholder
- Title: Miss Bolivia 2005
- Major competitions: Miss Bolivia 2005 (Winner); Miss Universe 2006 (Top 10)

María Desiree Durán Morales (born October 7, 1985, in Santa Cruz de la Sierra, Bolivia) is a Bolivian model and beauty pageant titleholder who participated in Miss Universe 2006 as Miss Bolivia and made top 10.

== Biography ==
Durán began her career as model when she was 16 years old, participating in Miss Tourism World, obtaining the awards of Miss Personality and Miss Sympathy.

In 2005, she participated in Miss Santa Cruz, and was chosen Miss Coastal, a title that allowed her to participate in Miss Bolivia, winning in this last one, and therefore, obtaining the right to participate in Miss Universe.

On July 23, 2006, in Los Angeles, she was chosen as one of the ten finalists in Miss Universe 2006.

Her career is now focused on social service and politics. She is also the co-hostess of the daily morning show "En Hora Buena", along with Sandra Parada, on the Red PAT network, anchoring the Santa Cruz de la Sierra regional version of the program. Desiree Duran participated in the Bolivia Moda fashion Show in Santa Cruz.
