= Miss USA 2006 =

55th Miss USA pageant

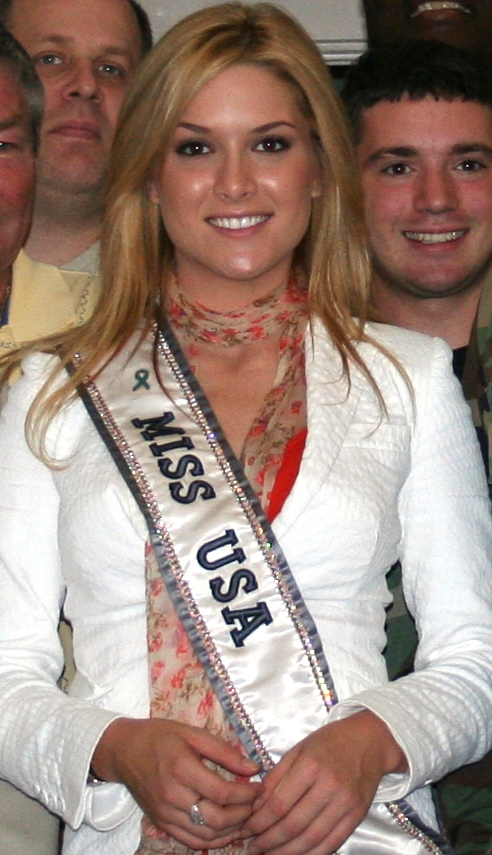
- Miss USA 2006 Tara Conner
- Date: April 21, 2006
- Presenters: Nancy O'Dell; Drew Lachey
- Entertainment: East Village Opera Company
- Venue: Baltimore Arena, Baltimore, Maryland
- Broadcaster: NBC, WBAL-TV
- Entrants: 51
- Placements: 15
- Winner: Tara Conner; Kentucky
- Congeniality: Dottie Cannon; Minnesota
- Photogenic: Cristin Duren; Florida

Miss USA 2006 was the 55th Miss USA pageant, held at the Royal Farms Arena in Baltimore, Maryland on April 21, 2006. Fifty-one state titleholders competed for the title, which was won by Tara Conner of Kentucky. Conner was crowned by outgoing titleholder Chelsea Cooley of North Carolina.

This was the second consecutive year that the pageant was held in Baltimore, although the venue changed from the Hippodrome Theater to the larger 1st Mariner Arena. Delegates arrived in the city on 2 April 2006, and were involved in three weeks of events, appearances and preliminary competitions before the final competition. This included a trip to New York City to attend a book launch for The Miss Universe Guide to Beauty and make media appearances on Regis and Kathy, The Early Show and Total Request Live.

The pageant hosts were Nancy O'Dell (who had hosted the pageant in 2004 and 2005) and Drew Lachey. For the first time Queer Eye for the Straight Guy star Carson Kressley provided commentary. Special guest performers were the East Village Opera Company.

The finals were broadcast by NBC, with 7.77 million viewers, the second-lowest viewership ever recorded.

The winner represented the United States at Miss Universe 2006 on July 23, 2006, in Los Angeles where she placed 4th Runner-up.

== Results ==
=== Placements ===
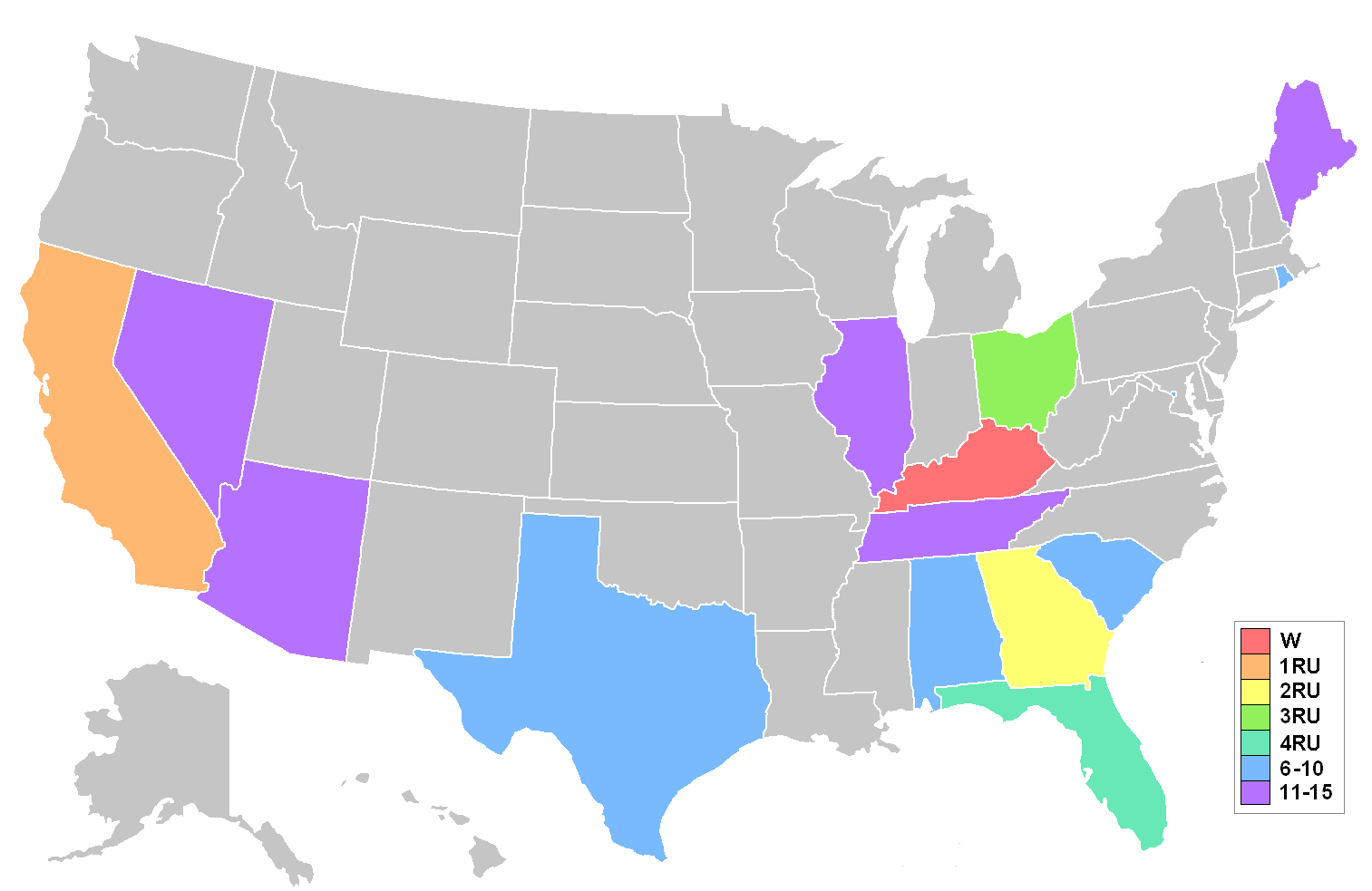
Map showing placements by state

Final results	Contestant
Miss USA 2006	Kentucky – Tara Conner
1st Runner-Up	California – Tamiko Nash
2nd Runner-Up	Georgia – Lisa Wilson
3rd Runner-Up	Ohio – Stacy Offenberger
4th Runner-Up	Florida – Cristin Duren
Top 10	Alabama – Haleigh Stidham; District of Columbia – Candace Allen; Rhode Island – Leeann Tingley; South Carolina – Lacie Lybrand; Texas – Lauren Lanning
Top 15	Arizona – Brenna Sakas; Illinois – Catherine Warren; Maine – Katee Stearns; Nevada – Lauren Scyphers; Tennessee – Lauren Grissom

=== Awards ===
Award	Contestant
Miss Congeniality	Minnesota – Dottie Cannon
Miss Photogenic	Florida – Cristin Duren

== Contestants ==
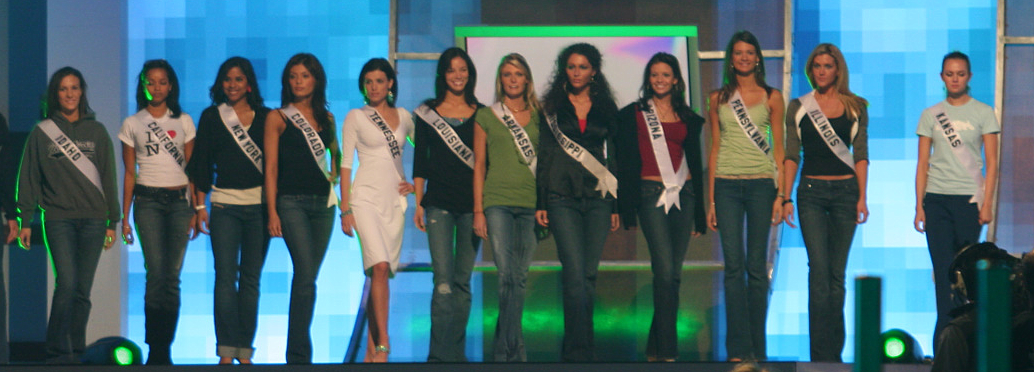
Contestants during pageant rehearsals

The Miss USA 2006 delegates were:

- Alabama – Haleigh Stidham
- Alaska – Noelle Meyer
- Arizona – Brenna Sakas
- Arkansas – Kimberly Forsyth
- California – Tamiko Nash
- Colorado – Jacqueline Madera
- Connecticut – Jeannine Phillips
- Delaware – Ashlee Greenwell
- District of Columbia – Candace Allen
- Florida – Cristin Duren
- Georgia – Lisa Wilson
- Hawaii – Radasha Ho'ohuli
- Idaho – Allyson Swan
- Illinois – Catherine Warren
- Indiana – Bridget Bobel
- Iowa – Sarah Corpstein
- Kansas – Ashley Aull
- Kentucky – Tara Conner
- Louisiana – Christina Cuenca
- Maine – Katee Stearns
- Maryland – Melissa DiGiulian
- Massachusetts – Tiffany Kelly
- Michigan – Danelle Gay
- Minnesota – Dottie Cannon
- Mississippi – Kendra King
- Missouri – Kristi Capel
- Montana – Jill McLain
- Nebraska – Emily Poeschl
- Nevada – Lauren Scyphers
- New Hampshire – Krystal Barry
- New Jersey – Jessica Boyington
- New Mexico – Onawa Lacy
- New York – Adriana Diaz
- North Carolina – Samantha Holvey
- North Dakota – Kimberly Krueger
- Ohio – Stacy Offenberger
- Oklahoma – Robyn Watkins
- Oregon – Allison Machado
- Pennsylvania – Tanya Lehman
- Rhode Island – Leeann Tingley
- South Carolina – Lacie Lybrand
- South Dakota – Alexis LeVan
- Tennessee – Lauren Grissom
- Texas – Lauren Lanning
- Utah – Soben Huon
- Vermont – Amanda Gilman
- Virginia – Amber Copley
- Washington – Tiffany Doorn
- West Virginia – Jessica Wedge
- Wisconsin – Anna Piscitello
- Wyoming – Kristin George

== Judges ==
There were two sets of judges: one for the preliminary competition (held on April 14), and another for the final night of competition (April 21). The latter judges decided who won the Miss USA title.

=== Preliminary judges ===
- Jeff Kimbell – businessman involved in lobbying, political strategy, real estate, and entertainment.
- Kerry Cavanaugh – North American brand manager for CoverGirl cosmetics.
- Natasha O'Dell – producer for Black Entertainment Television's Special Projects Division.
- Valerie Boyce – an agent for Trump Model Management.
- Arnold Williams – manager of Abrams, Foster, Nole & William (based in Pennsylvania) since 1993.
- Robb Merrit – Vice President of a commercial real estate developer based in Baltimore, MD.
- Rhona Gaff – Vice President at the Trump Organization and is best known as the woman who rings Apprentice candidates each morning to give candidate their directions.

=== Finals judges ===
- Jillian Barberie – actress and entertainer reporter for Good Day LA.
- Donny Deutsch – executive and talk show host.
- Gina Drosos - Vice President and General Manager of Global Cosmetics for Procter & Gamble.
- Steve Madden – founder of a footwear company that bears his name.
- Nicole Linkletter – fashion model who won America's Next Top Model, Cycle 5.
- Donald Trump Jr. – Executive Vice President for Development and Acquisitions and son of pageant owner Donald Trump.
- James Hyde – starred as Sam Bennett on NBC's Passions for seven years.
- Hines Ward – wide receiver for the Pittsburgh Steelers
- Chad Hedrick – speed skater and world record holder.

== Pre-pageant specials ==
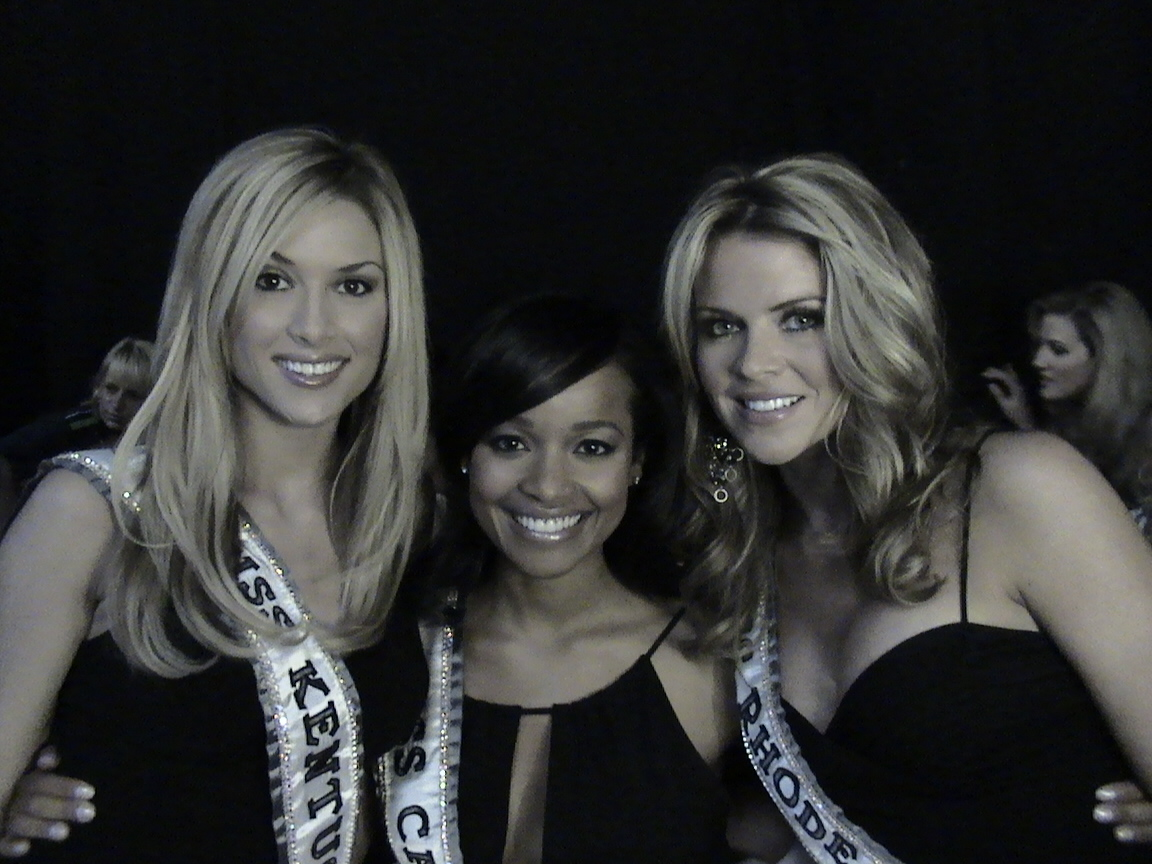
Tara Conner, Tamiko Nash and Leeann Tingley back stage during the taping of Deal or No Deal

A pre-pageant special edition of Deal or No Deal aired on April 12 on NBC. It included Miss USA 2005 Chelsea Cooley and twenty-six contestants, who replaced the show's models as briefcase-holders: Haleigh Stidham (AL), Kimberly Forsyth (AR), Tamiko Nash (CA), Jeannine Phillips (CT), Ashlee Greenwell (DE), Cristin Duren (FL), Catherine Warren (IL), Bridget Bobel (IN), Tara Conner (KY), Christina Cuenca (LA), Katee Stearns (ME), Tiffany Kelly (MA), Danelle Gay (MI), Dottie Cannon, (MN), Kristi Capel (MO), Lauren Scyphers (NV), Jessica Boyington (NJ), Onawa Lacy (NM), Samantha Holvey (NC), Kimberly Krueger (ND), Tanya Lehman (PA), Leeann Tingley (RI), Lacie Lybrand (SC), Soben Huon (UT), Amber Copley (VA), Jessica Wedge (WV).

Allison Machado (OR) was the alternate.
