= Adrienn Bende =

Hungarian racing driver and model

- Born: 25 June 1985 (age 41); Budapest, Hungary
- Occupations: Driver; model; beauty pageant

Adrienn Bende (born 25 June 1985) is a Hungarian driver, model and beauty pageant titleholder who was crowned Miss Universe Hungary 2006 and represented her country at Miss Universe 2006 where she placed Top 20.

== Early life ==
=== Model career ===
Bende was born in Budapest and was the winner of the Miss Universe Hungary contest in 2006, and one of the 20 semi-finalists of the Miss Universe 2006 contest from Los Angeles.

=== Racing career ===
She is, since 2011, a race driver at the Lotus Ladies Cup in Lotus Elise. Bende's first racing team was ProexSport Kft, since 2014, she is a driver for Czollner Motorsport.
