= Angela Asare =

Ghanaian beauty queen

Angela Asare (born 24 October 1985 in Accra) is a Ghanaian ambassador, model and beauty pageant titleholder who was crowned Miss Universe Ghana 2006 and represented her country at Miss Universe 2006.

== Education ==
Angela Asare studied marketing at Montgomery College.

== Beauty pageants ==
Angela Asare was the Ghanaian national ambassador for AIDS awareness. In 2006 she won the Miss Universe Ghana beauty contest. She later represented Ghana at Miss Universe 2006, which took place 23 July 2006 in Los Angeles. Asare, while failing to qualify in the pink of the 15 finalists finals, still managed to get the title of Miss Congeniality. At the time of the election, she was a student of Business Marketing. In 2007 she was the face of RUNWAY AFRICA, the first African fashion show in the United States. She appeared on the cover of MIMI Magazine for the 2007 summer edition.

Awards and achievements
Preceded by Menaye Donkor	Miss Universe Ghana; 2006	Succeeded by Yvette Nsiah
