= Miss Cyprus =

Beauty pageant

Star Cyprus
- Σταρ Κύπρος
- Type: Women's beauty pageant
- Headquarters: Nicosia
- Country represented: Cyprus
- Qualifies for: Miss Universe; Miss World; Miss International; Miss Earth; Miss Europe
- First edition: 1973
- Last edition: 2017
- Language: Greek
- Website: starcyprus.com

Star Cyprus (Greek: Σταρ Κύπρος), also known as Miss Cyprus, was a national beauty pageant in Cyprus. Until 2012, the main winner competed at Miss Universe and Miss Cyprus at Miss World. From 2015 to 2018, Star Cyprus represented the country at Miss World and Miss Cyprus at Miss Earth. The pageant was discontinued in 2018 and has not been held since.

== History ==
The first modern Cypriot competition took place in 1973. the organization has been financed by the famed brewing company Carlsberg. the competition has taken place at the Carlsberg-festival location. In 1975 and 1976, the pageant was cancelled due to the Turkish invasion.

The winners receive the titles "Star Kypros", '"Miss Kypros", "Miss Carlsberg" and "Miss Mediterranean". Starting in 2013, after losing the Miss Universe franchise, the winners of the event go on to represent Cyprus at the Miss World (Star Kypros), Miss Earth (Miss Kypros), plus two runners-up. The following abbreviations are used for the different titles: Only one person has gone to place in the beauty pageants which is Miss Cyprus 2002 who finished 8th.

=== National titles ===
The winners receive the title:

- SK = Star Kypros (Greek: Σταρ Κύπρος)
- MK = Miss Kypros (Greek: Μις Κύπρος)

Other positions receive the title:

- Miss Mediterranean
- Miss Carlsberg
- Miss Young (Miss Teen Cyprus)
- First Runner-up
- Second Runner-up

== Miss Universe ==
- Star Cyprus was responsible for the local organization of the Miss Universe 2000, that was held in Nicosia.
- Star Cyprus 2001, Demetra Eleftheriou is the only Cypriot to advance among the semifinalists in Miss Universe, a fact that happened in Miss Universe 2002 in San Juan, Puerto Rico.
- In 2024, an Indonesian businesswoman took over Miss Universe license for Cyprus.

== Titleholders ==
Winner International Title
Miss Universe Cyprus
Miss World Cyprus
Miss International Cyprus
Miss Earth Cyprus
Miss Europe Cyprus

Year	Star Kypros	Miss Kypros	Miss Carlsberg	Miss Mediterranean	1st runner-up	2nd runner-up
1973	Ioanna Melanidou	Eleni Siakou	Maro Volari	Debuted 1995	Held 1979	Held 1990
1974	Antri Tsangaridou	Christina Agathangelou	Tina Diakin	Debuted 1995	Held 1979	Held 1990
1977	Georgia Georgiou	Marina Flourou	Maria Nicolaidou	Debuted 1995	Held 1979	Held 1990
1978	Mairi (Mary) Adámou	Dimitra Georgiou	Maria Pantazi	Debuted 1995	Held 1979	Held 1990
1979	Dina Christodoulidou	Eliána Christou	Sofia Kyriakidou	Debuted 1995	Andri Charicleidou	Held 1990
1980	Georgia Christodoulidou (Note: Relinquished.)	Parthenopi (Popi) Vasiliadou	Suzy Handrian; Sophie Terenti	Debuted 1995	x	Held 1990
1980	Nicoletta Symeonidou (Note: Originally first runner-up of Star Cyprus; she took over the title after the original winner relinquished.)	Parthenopi (Popi) Vasiliadou	Suzy Handrian; Sophie Terenti	Debuted 1995	x	Held 1990
1981	Katia Angelidou	Eleni Andreou	Ksanthoula Panteli	Debuted 1995	x	Held 1990
1982	Maria Panagiotou	Marina Elena Rauscher	Sylvia Spanias Nitsa	Debuted 1995	x	Held 1990
1983	Katia Chrysochou	Eleftheria Melodia	Marina Petrou	Debuted 1995	x	Held 1990
1984	Chrýso Christodoúlou	Agathi Demitriou	Maria Charalambous	Debuted 1995	x	Held 1990
1985	Christína Vasileiádou	Stavroula Chrysostomou	Naso Georgiou	Debuted 1995	x	Held 1990
1986	Natása (Natasha) Papadimitríou	Katerina Ioannou	Aleksandra Georgiou	Debuted 1995	x	Held 1990
1987	Niki Christou	Maria Evagora	Myria Christofidou	Debuted 1995	Maria Christofi	Held 1990
1988	Ríta Theofánous	Kristia Papadopoulou	Elena Loizidou	Debuted 1995	Fivi Filippou	Held 1990
1989	Irma Voulgari	Natasa Andreou	Irene Demetriou	Debuted 1995	x	Held 1990
1990	Aimili Groutidou	Evi Ioannidou	Paulina Loizidou	Debuted 1995	Maria Hadjitheodoulou	Zina Theodoridou
1991	Militsa Papadopoulou	Anna Stefanou	Christina Neocleous	Debuted 1995	Giota Koufalidou	x
1992	Foteiní Spyrídonos	Georgia Sergiou	x	Debuted 1995	Andria Petridou	Maria Kountouri
1993	Maria Vasiliou	Maria Magdalini Valianti	Clara Davina Rainbow	Debuted 1995		
1994	Clara Davina Rainbow	Ioanna Irwin	Georgia Piponidou	Debuted 1995	Sofia Charalambous	Eleni Chrisostomou
1995	Fróso (Efi) Spýrou	Isabella Giorgallou	Christina Stavrinidou	Johanna Irwin	Panagiota Panagiotou	Christiana Ioannou
1996	Korina Nikolaou	Maria Papaprodromou	Skevi Efstathiou	Maria Theodoulou	Christina Stavrinidou	Mary Sofroniou
1997	Daniela Iordanova	Galatia Charalambidou	Linda Abraham	Marianna Panagiotou	Koula Kourouklari	Sylvana Mouller
1998	Valentína Dionysíou	Chrysanthi Michael	Giotta Pittyri	Afroditi Pericleous	Corina Constandinidou	Ifigenia Papaioannou
1999	Christi Groutidou	Sofi Georgiou	Marina Christodoulou	Nicoleta Violari	Koula Michael	Vicky Pogiatzi
2000	Stella Demetriou	Ifigenia Papaioannou	Karolina Kyprinou	Maria Xatzivasiliou	Niki Manoli	x
2001	Demetra Eleftheriou	Christiana Aristotelous	Despina Romanaki	Nicole Stylianou	Georgia Georgiou	Victoria Efthivoulou
2002	Evi Lazárou	Antzela Drousiotou	Valentina Chritovourou	Maria Pelekanou	Elena Andreou	Meyiva Ioupoavou
2003	Nayia Iacovidou	Stella Stylianou	Iliana Charalambous	Demitra Mouski	Mikaela Michail	Fotini Michaelidou
2004	Elena Hadjidemetriou	Konstantina Euripidou	Christina Demitriou	Nickol Georgiou	Anna Theodoulou	Elena Kafetzi
2005	Elena Ierodiakonou	Nickol Temene	Anna Theologou	Charis Demetriou	Anna Irakleous	Doksia Moutsouri
2006	Polyvia Achilleos	Elli Manoli	Konstantina Christodoulou	Elena Georgiou	Zina Ioannou	Giota Antiniou
2007	Dimitra Sergiou	x	Dora Anastasiou	Stephany Paraskeva	Vesi Philippou	Styliana Omirou
2008	Kielia Giasemidou	Iosifina Sekki	x	x	Demetra Makriyianni	Mari Vasilieiou
2009	Demetra Olimpiou	Christalla Tsiali	x	x	Andrea Kkolou	Valentina El Sabet
2011	Andriani Karantoni	Orthodoxia Panagi	x	x	Kristy Marie Agapiou	Stefania Konstantinou
2012	Ntaniella Kefala; Did not compete	Georgia Georgiou	x	x	Ioanna Giannakou	Tzouliana Georgallidou
2013	Elisa Georgiou; Did not compete	Ioanna Filippou	x	x	Katerina Theodorou	Mairy Zavou
2014	Markélla Konstantínou	Rafaella Charalambous	x	x	Myriel Grigoriou	Charis Louka
2015	Maria Morarou	Maria Kosta	x	x	Athina Loizou	Marina Kyriakou
2016	Helena Tselepi	Artemis Charalambous	x	x	Light Giagkou	Natasha Nikolaou
2017	Andriána Fiáka	Maria Armenakis	x	x	Daria Erochina	Ismini Evanthi
Since 2018 the Star Cyprus suspended the pageant and no more updates regarding the pageant nowadays.

== Miss Universe Cyprus ==
- : Declared as Winner
- : Ended as runner-up or top 5/6 qualification
- : Ended as one of the finalists or semifinalists
- : Ended as special awards winner

Star Cyprus winners went to Miss Universe since the pageant formation created in 1973. Between 1973 and 2012 the main winners competed at Miss Universe and in 2024 Cyprus was back under Poppy Capella directorship. On occasion, when the winner does not qualify (due to age) for either contest, a runner-up is sent.

Year	District	Miss Cyprus	Greek Name	Placement at Miss Universe	Special Award(s)	Notes
Poppy Capella directorship — a franchise holder to Miss Universe from 2024
2024	Nicosia	Katerina Dimitriou	Κατερίνα Δημητρίου	Unplaced		No pageant in 2024 ― due to lack of time management, the Miss Universe Cyprus competition did not happen physically, but Katerina was selected by casting and she went to Miss Universe 2024.
Carlsberg Group — Mega TV Cyprus directorship — a franchise holder to Miss Universe from 1973―2013
Did not compete on 2014—2023
2013	Larnaca	Elisa Georgiou	Ελίζα Γεωργίου	Did not compete		Star Cyprus Organization lost the franchise of Miss Universe. The organization decided to withdraw Elisa at Miss Universe 2013 in Russia.
2012	Nicosia	Ioanna Giannakou	Ιωάννα Γιαννάκου	Unplaced		Appointed — The actual winner, Ntaniella Kefala did not compete at Miss Universe 2012. Due to unknown reasons Ntaniella planned to compete at Miss Universe 2013 but it was not happening anymore.
2011	Larnaca	Andriani "Andri" Karantoni	Ανδριανή «Άνδρη» Καραντώνη	Unplaced		
2010	Larnaca	Dimitra Olympiou	Δήμητρα Ολυμπίου	Unplaced		
2009	Nicosia	Klelia Giasemidou	Κλέλια Γιασεμίδου	Unplaced		
2008	Limassol	Dimitra Sergiou	Δήμητρα Σεργίου	Unplaced		
2007	Nicosia	Polyvia Achilleos	Πολύβια Αχιλλέως	Unplaced		
2006	Nicosia	Elena Ierodiakonou	Έλενα Ιεροδιακόνου	Unplaced		
2005	Nicosia	Elena Hadjidemetriou	Έλενα Χατζηδημητρίου	Unplaced		
2004	Nicosia	Nayia Iakovidoú	Ναυια Ιακοβιδού	Unplaced		
2003	Limassol	Evi Lazárou	Ήβη Λαζάρου	Unplaced		
2002	Nicosia	Dímitra Eleutheríou	Δήμητρα Ελευθερίου	Top 10		
2001	Nicosia	Stélla Dimitríou	Στέλλα Δημητρίου	Unplaced		
2000	Nicosia	Chrystálla Groutídou	Χρυστάλλα Γρουτίδου	Unplaced		
1999	Nicosia	Valentína Dionysíou	Βαλεντίνα Διονυσίου	Unplaced		
1998	Nicosia	Ntaniélla (Daniella) Iordánooa	Ντανιέλλα Ιορδάνοωα	Unplaced		
1997	Larnaca	Korína Nikoláou	Κορίνα Νικολάου	Unplaced		
1996	Nicosia	Fróso (Efi) Spýrou	Φρόσω (΄Εφη) Σπύρου	Unplaced		
1995	Nicosia	Clara Davina Rainbow	Κλάρα Νταβίνα Ρέϊνμποου	Unplaced		
1994	Nicosia	María Magdaliní Valiantí	Μαρία Μαγδαληνή Βαλιαντή	Unplaced		
1993	Nicosia	Foteiní Spyrídonos	Φωτεινή Σπυρίδωνος	Unplaced		
1992	Nicosia	Milítsa Papadopoúlou	Μηλίτσα Παπαδοπούλου	Unplaced		
Did not compete between 1988—1991
1987	Nicosia	Natása (Natasha) Papadimitríou	Νατάσα Παπαδημητρίου	Unplaced		
1986	Nicosia	Christína Vasileiádou	Χριστίνα Βασιλειάδου	Unplaced		
1985	Nicosia	Andri Andreou	Άντρη Ανδρέου	Unplaced		Appointed — The actual winner, Christína Vasileiádou did not compete at Miss Universe 1985 and allocated to Miss Universe 1986.
1984	Nicosia	Zsa Zsa Melodias	—	Unplaced		Appointed — The actual winner, Chrýso Christodoúlou did not compete at Miss Universe 1984. Zsa Zsa replaced her to compete in Miami, Florida.
1983	Nicosia	Marina Elena Rauscher	Μαρίνα Έλενα Ράουσερ	Unplaced		Appointed — The actual winner, Maria Panagiotou did not compete at Miss Universe 1983. Marina replaced her to compete in St. Louis, Missouri.
1982	Nicosia	Sylvia Spanias Nitsa	Σύλβια Σπανιά Νίτσα	Did not compete		Withdrew — Indicated as a British citizen and Sylvia was from London, Great Britain. Miss Universe Organization disallowed her to compete.
1981	Nicosia	Katia Aggelidou	Κάτια Αγγελίδου	Unplaced		
1980	Nicosia	Georgia Christodoulidou	Γεωργία Χριστοδούλου	Did not compete		Withdrew — Listed at Miss Universe 1980 in South Korea. Due to internal matter, Christodoulidou did not compete at Miss Universe.
Did not compete between 1975—1979
1974	Nicosia	Antri Tsaggaridou	Αντρη Τσαγγαρίδου	Unplaced		
1973	Nicosia	Eirini-Ioanna Melanidou	Ειρήνη-Ιωάννα Μελανίδου	Unplaced		

== See also ==
- Star Hellas
- Star GS Hellas
