= Lia Ramos =

Filipino model and entrepreneur

Lia Andrea Aquino Ramos
- Born: Lia Andrea Aquino Ramos
- Occupations: Head of Women Empowerment Committee and Charity — Miss Universe Philippines Organization
- Height: 5 ft 8 in (1.73 m)
- Beauty pageant titleholder
- Title: Binibining Pilipinas Universe 2006
- Hair color: Black
- Eye color: Black
- Major competitions: Binibining Pilipinas 2006 (Winner – Binibining Pilipinas Universe 2006); Miss Universe 2006 (Unplaced) (Miss Photogenic)

Lia Andrea Aquino Ramos-Moss is a Filipino model, beauty pageant titleholder, and entrepreneur. She represented the Philippines in the Miss Universe 2006 pageant held in Los Angeles, California. Lia was also voted as Miss Photogenic that same year. She is a political science graduate of the University of the Philippines.

She was previously a program officer for The Asia Foundation in Manila. Currently, Ramos is the CEO of Glamourbox, a Philippines-based beauty and cosmetics retailer.

Awards and achievements
Preceded by (Philippines) Gionna Cabrera	Miss Universe (Miss Photogenic); 2006	Succeeded by (Philippines) Theresa Licaros
Preceded by Gionna Cabrera	Binibining Pilipinas Universe; 2006	Succeeded by Theresa Licaros
