= Elena Ierodiakonou =

Greek Cypriot model (born 1982)

- Born: 1982 (age 43–44); Cyprus
- Height: 1.80 m (5 ft 11 in)
- Beauty pageant titleholder
- Hair color: Brown
- Eye color: Brown

Elena Ierodiakonou (Greek: Έλενα Ιεροδιακόνου) (born c. 1982) is a Greek Cypriot model and beauty pageant titleholder. She won the Miss Star Cyprus title (Greek: Μις Σταρ Κύπρος) during the Carlsberg Pancyprean Official Beauty Contest in July 2005 and went on to represent Cyprus at the 2006 Miss Universe pageant in Los Angeles, California in July. She was brought up on the small Greek island of Kalymnos, near the seaside, where she used to swim every day. Her family moved back to Cyprus when she was eight. She describes herself as having the ability to see the positive view of every difficult situation.
