= Melissa Tan =

Melissa Ann Tan
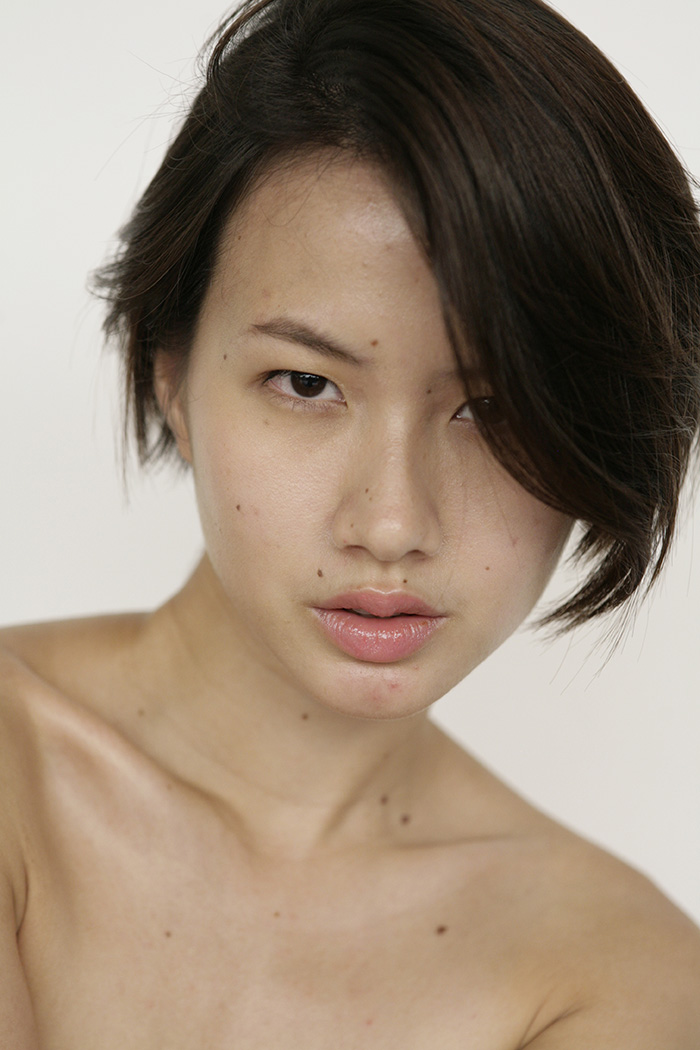
- 2015
- Born: 13 July 1981 (age 44); Melaka, Malaysia
- Occupation: Model
- Known for: Miss Malaysia Universe 2006
- Modelling information
- Height: 1.65 m (5 ft 5 in)
- Hair colour: Black
- Eye colour: Brown

Melissa Ann Tan is a Malaysian Chinese model and beauty pageant titleholder. She became Miss Malaysia Universe 2006 and competed in Miss Universe 2006 and did not placed in Miss Universe pageant. She is of s Chinese-Nyonya and Dutch-Portuguese descent.

== Miss Malaysia Universe 2006 ==
She won the title of Miss Malaysia Universe in 2006. She then represented Malaysia in the Miss Universe 2006 pageant.
