= Anna Litvinova =

Russian fashion model (1983–2013)

- Born: Anna Vladimirovna Litvinova; 1 May 1983; Novokuznetsk, Russian SFSR, USSR
- Died: 22 January 2013 (aged 29); Berlin, Germany
- Occupation: Fashion model
- Years active: 2003–2013
- Modeling information
- Height: 1.80 m (5 ft 11 in)
- Hair color: Blonde
- Eye color: Blue

Anna Vladimirovna Litvinova (Russian: Анна Владимировна Литвинова; 1 May 1983 – 22 January 2013) was a Russian fashion model and beauty pageant titleholder. She won the Miss Universe - Russia 2006 beauty contest and represented Russia at Miss Universe 2006 contest, where she finished in the top 20.

Later she moved to Moscow and started a modelling career. There she helped aspiring models to find work abroad. She died in January 2013 after suffering from cancer for one year.

== Biography ==
=== Early life ===
Litvinova was born and raised in Novokuznetsk. In 2003, she completed her graduations from Kuzbass State Pedagogical Academy, where she studied at the Faculty of Foreign Languages.

=== Career ===
In 2003 Litvinova won the title of the most beautiful woman in the "Miss Kuzbass", and entered the top five on the All-Russian competition of beauty, with the title of "Miss Grace." She became the first runner-up in "Miss Siberia" contest. In 2006 she won Miss Universe - Russia contest and then went to Los Angeles to represent Russia in Miss Universe. She did not win, but finished in the Top 20.

After winning the regional beauty competition of Novokuznetsk, she went to Moscow and started a modelling career. In Moscow she worked as a manager, she was organizing competitions and helping models to find work abroad. There she worked as second degree designer too. About her life in Moscow, Litvinova said "Moscow is a very large, noisy, bustling city. But I got used to it and loved it."

=== Death ===
Litvinova was diagnosed with melanoma about a year prior to her death. She was taken for treatment to a clinic in Germany but died on 22 January 2013 at the age of 29.

== Awards ==
Here is a list of titles and awards Litvinova won in her career.

Year	Contest	Result
2003	Miss Russia	Top 5 finish
2003	Vice-Miss Siberia	Won
2003	Miss Kuzbass	Won
2006	Miss Universe - Russia	Won
2006	Miss Universe	Top 20 finish
