= Tara Conner =

American model and winner of Miss USA 2006

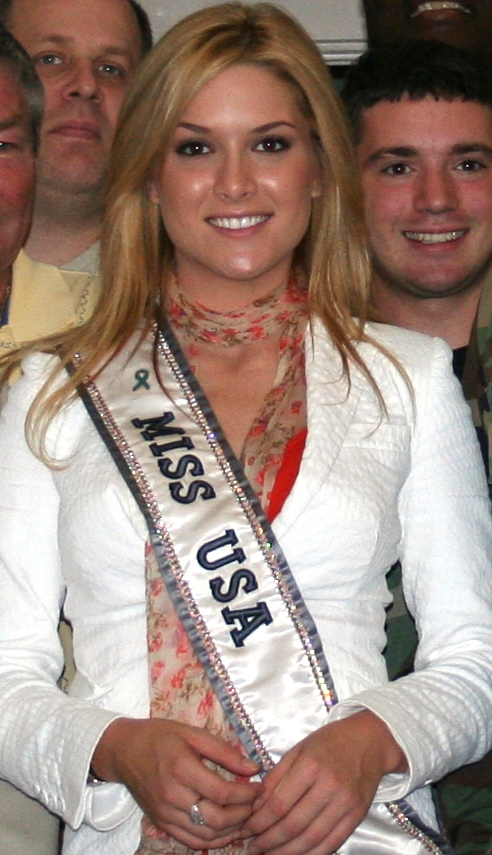
- Conner as Miss USA 2006
- Born: Tara Elizabeth Conner; December 18, 1985 (age 40); Dallas, Texas, U.S.
- Height: 5 ft 5 in (1.65 m)
- Beauty pageant titleholder
- Title: Miss Kentucky Teen USA 2002; Miss Kentucky USA 2006; Miss USA 2006
- Hair color: Blonde
- Eye color: Brown
- Major competitions: Miss Kentucky Teen USA 2002; (Winner); Miss Teen USA 2002; (2nd Runner-Up); Miss Kentucky USA 2006; (Winner); Miss USA 2006; (Winner); Miss Universe 2006; (4th Runner-Up)

Tara Elizabeth Conner (born December 18, 1985) is an American model, tv host and beauty pageant titleholder who was crowned Miss USA 2006 and has also competed in the Miss Teen USA and Miss Universe pageants. Apart from her role as Miss USA, Conner has been employed as a model. She was a featured model on the HDNet series Bikini Destinations in 2004, posing in Lake Tahoe. She has also held the titles Miss Kentucky Teen USA 2002, Miss Kentucky County Fair 2004, and Miss Kentucky USA 2006.

In late 2006, Conner became the center of a public scandal after she was caught drinking underage, using cocaine, and kissing Miss Teen USA Katie Blair at a New York nightclub. She was allowed to retain her title, provided she enter a drug rehabilitation program. Since then Conner has worked as an advocate against drug addiction.

== Early life ==
Tara was born in Dallas, Texas to Brenda and John Conner. She has one brother, Josh. Her family moved to Russell Springs, Kentucky when she was six weeks old. Tara Conner stated that she started resorting to drugs at the age of 14, when her parents separated from each other and her grandfather died.

Conner graduated from Russell County High School in 2004, and at the time of her Miss USA win was studying for a degree in business administration from Somerset Community College.

== Beauty pageants ==
=== Miss Teen USA 2002 ===
Conner won the Miss Kentucky Teen USA title in 2001. In August 2002, she went on to compete in the Miss Teen USA pageant held in South Padre Island, Texas. After making the first cut, Conner achieved the highest swimsuit score (9.18) among the 10 semi-finalists and had the fifth highest evening gown score (8.79). The average of these two scores placed her second overall after these two phases of competition. She eventually placed second Runner-up to Vanessa Semrow of Wisconsin.

=== Miss Kentucky USA 2006 ===
Conner returned to pageantry in November 2005 when she won the Miss Kentucky USA crown, and was crowned by former Miss Kentucky Teen USA 2000 and Miss Kentucky USA 2005 Kristen Johnson. She was the third former teen titleholder to win the Miss Kentucky USA title, others being Johnson and Elizabeth Arnold, who held the teen title in 1998 and was Conner's sister titleholder as Miss Kentucky USA 2002.

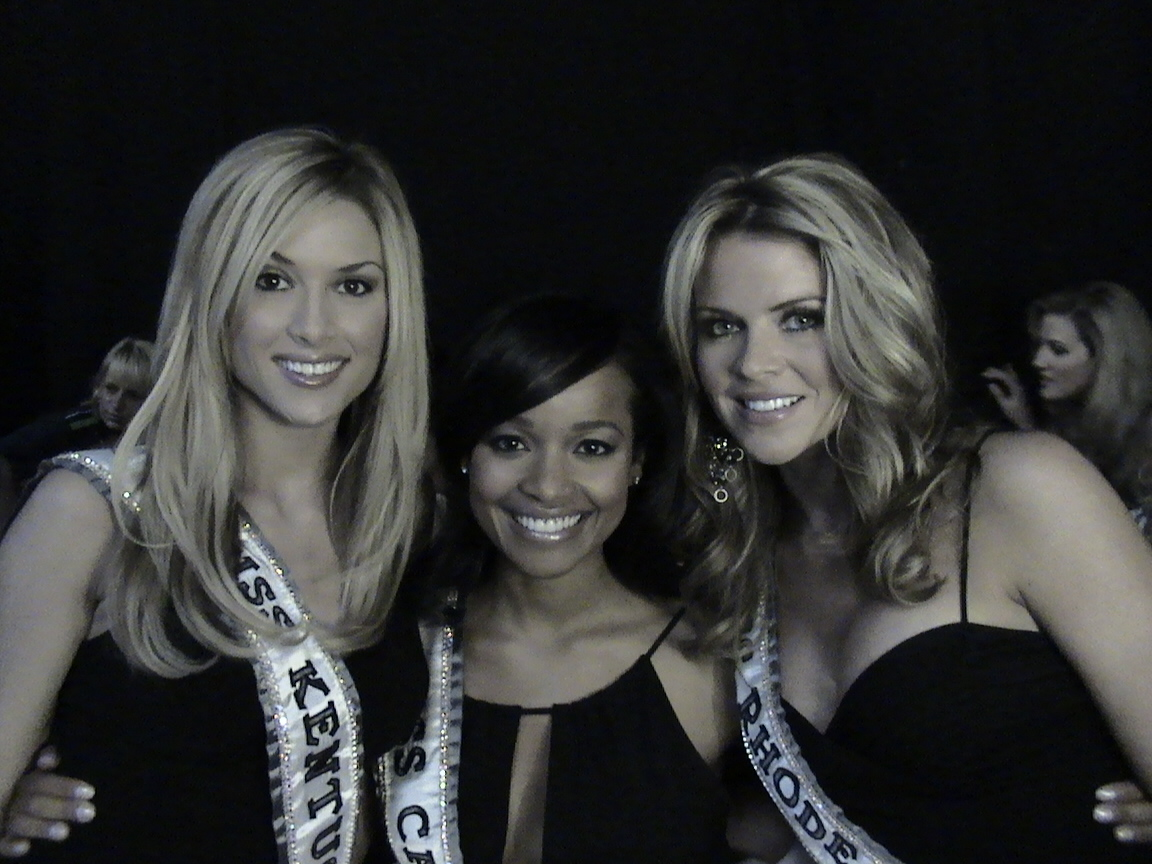
Conner (left) during the Deal or No Deal taping. Eventual Miss USA first runner-up, Miss California USA Tamiko Nash is at center; Leeann Tingley, who placed in the top ten, is on the right. This image does not reflect their true heights, as Conner is slightly shorter than Nash.

In March 2006, while still Miss Kentucky USA, Conner traveled to Los Angeles to tape a special episode of Deal or No Deal, which featured twenty five of the Miss USA 2006 delegates and reigning queen Chelsea Cooley. The special aired in April 2006.

=== Miss USA 2006 ===
Conner represented Kentucky during the nationally televised Miss USA 2006 pageant in Baltimore, Maryland, on April 21, 2006. Making the semi-finals, she became the 18th woman to place at both Miss Teen USA and Miss USA. She competed in the official BSC Swimwear Thailand for the swimsuit competition and made the top ten, where she competed in the evening gown competition, wearing a specially designed gown by Sherri Hill. Conner then made the top five and completed the final interview round. Prior to the announcement of the winner, Conner and her eventual first runner-up Tamiko Nash shared a long embrace, while Conner whispered to Nash. An E! special later revealed that Conner, believing Nash had won, was wishing her luck for her reign as Miss USA and her participation at Miss Universe. The traditional statement read before the announcement of the new titleholder, which declares that "if, for any reason the new titleholder cannot fulfill her reign, the first Runner-up will take over", later become pertinent following the scandal surrounding Conner in December. Conner eventually won the Miss USA title, the first woman from Kentucky to do so. She was crowned by previous titleholder Chelsea Cooley, from North Carolina. Conner was the fourth former Miss Teen USA state titleholder to win the Miss USA crown since 2000, one of whom was Cooley, who was Miss North Carolina Teen USA 2000.

=== Miss Universe 2006 ===
Conner represented the United States at the Miss Universe 2006 pageant in Los Angeles on July 23, 2006. Her roommate during the three weeks the delegates spent in Los Angeles was Kenisha Thom of Trinidad and Tobago. Her national costume was a jockey, representing the Kentucky Derby. Conner made the initial cut of 20 delegates and went on to compete in the swimsuit competition, and as a member of the top ten, competed in evening gown, wearing a dress designed by Kayne Gillaspie, a contestant on reality television show Project Runway Season 3. After making the top five and competing in a final interview round, Conner was announced as fourth Runner-up. The eventual winner was Zuleyka Rivera of Puerto Rico. Conner is only the fifth Miss USA to finish fourth Runner-up at Miss Universe.

== Year in the life of Miss USA ==
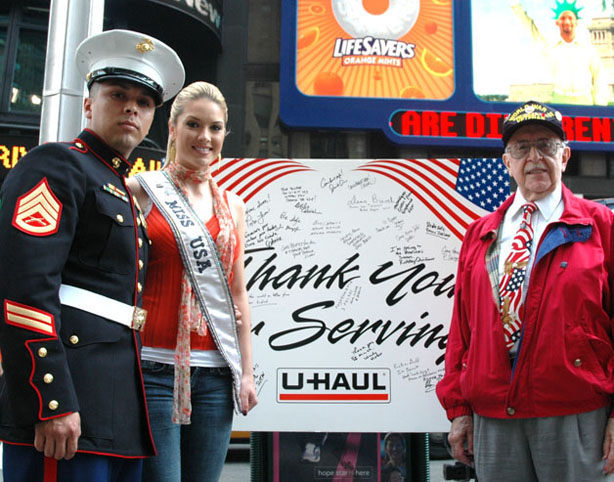
Tara Conner supporting the USO in New York City, October 2006

Immediately after winning the pageant, Conner moved into a Trump Place apartment that she shared with sister titleholders Zuleyka Rivera (Miss Universe 2006) and Katie Blair (Miss Teen USA 2006) during her reign. Her first week in New York included many media events, which included print interviews and spots on CNN Headline News, Live! With Regis and Kelly, and The Early Show.

On April 29, 2006, Conner returned to pageant host city Baltimore to make appearances connected with the Volvo Ocean Race, sailing on board the yacht Black Pearl. and then returned to New York, appearing with Miss Universe 2005 Natalie Glebova of Canada at the Invest in Our World Benefit on May 3, 2006.

In the first week of May she briefly returned to Kentucky for the Kentucky Derby and was a celebrity guest at the Mint Jubilee Gala, attending the event with fellow national beauty queen Jennifer Berry, Miss America 2006 of Miss Oklahoma and former Miss Kentucky USA titleholders Lizzie Arnold and Kristen Johnson, as well as other notable beauty queens.

On May 18, 2006, Conner rang the opening bell at the American Stock Exchange. She returned to Kentucky for her official homecoming in early June 2006. where she met with servicemen, with whom she posed for the July 2006 cover of Kentucky Monthly magazine, and volunteered with local charities.

On July 19, 2006, Conner appeared as a guest judge in an episode of the third season of the Bravo! series Project Runway. The contestants on the show competed against each other to create a dress for her to wear in the Miss Universe pageant. The dress was later featured in the evening gown competition of the pageant.

In August 2006, Conner met newly crowned Miss Universe Zuleyka Rivera and outgoing Miss Teen USA Allie LaForce in California where they were involved with media events, before all three travelled to Palm Springs, California for the Miss Teen USA 2006 pageant. On August 15 LaForce crowned Katie Blair of Montana as the new Miss Teen USA, and Conner, Rivera and Blair returned to New York the day after the pageant. Later that month, Conner and Blair attended a number of high-profile parties in New York including a Land Rover event featuring Maria Sharapova, a U.S. Open Kick-Off Party, a pre-Video Music Awards party hosted by Ciara and Missy Elliott and another Video Music Awards party hosted by Nick Lachey.

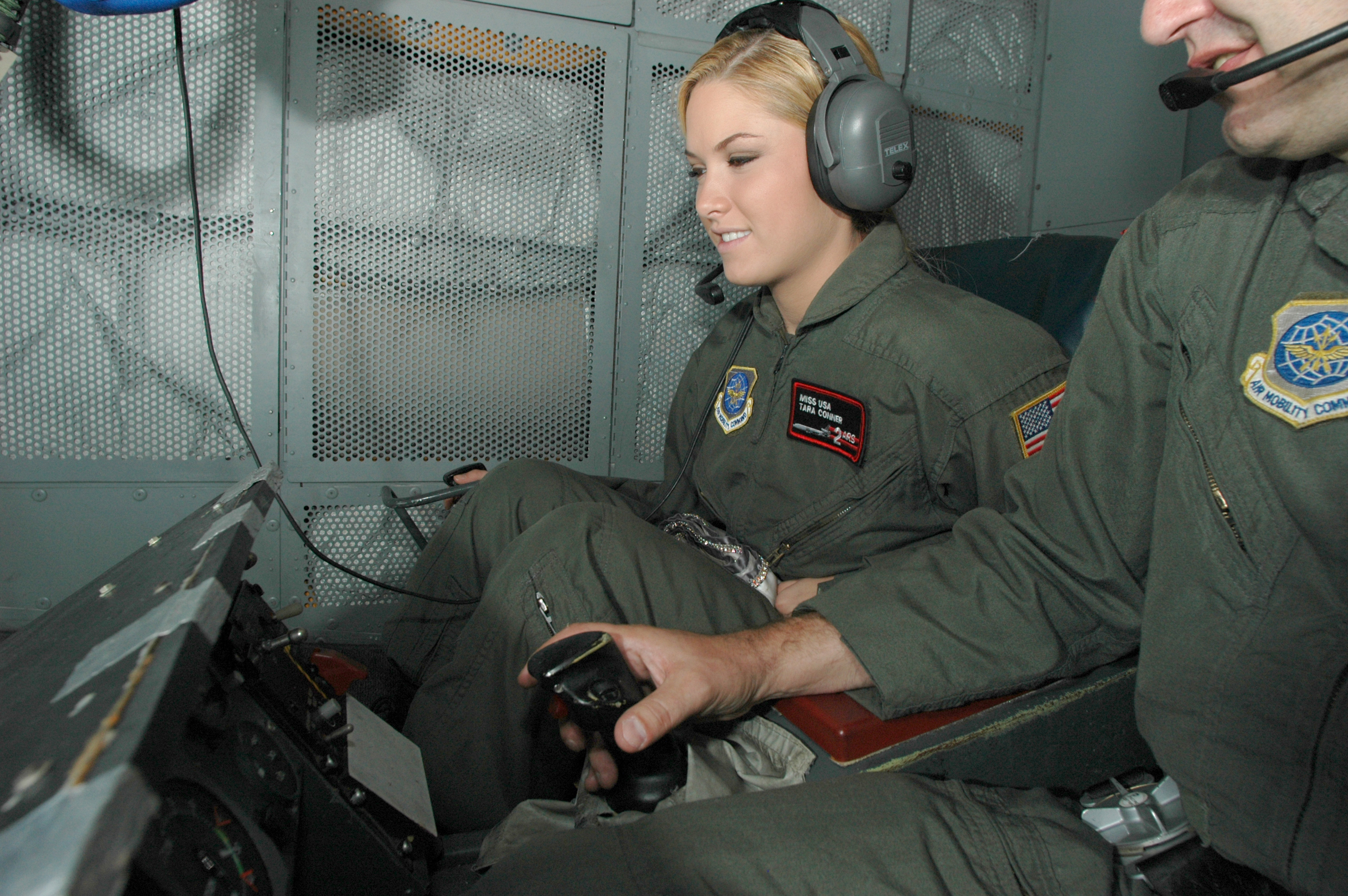
Conner operates military simulator at McGuire Air Force Base in Burlington County, New Jersey

In September 2006, Conner traveled to Boston, Massachusetts to promote the Susan G. Komen Breast Cancer Foundation Race for the Cure, as her predecessor Chelsea Cooley had done the year previously. She then travelled to Colorado to support the Cheryl Shackelford Foundation and to Pennsylvania to attend an event hosted by the USO of Philadelphia and Southern New Jersey. In October 2006, Conner spent time volunteering with more charities, including Gilda's Club, Best Buddies, and Project Sunshine, before embarking on a USO tour to Italy and Turkey in November 2006, where she met her brother, who is living in Italy.

During Thanksgiving weekend of November 2006, Conner appeared on the Showboat float in the Macy's Thanksgiving Day Parade, becoming the fourth Miss USA to appear in the parade. After attending the Miss Kentucky USA 2007 pageant and crowning Michelle Banzer as successor to her state title, she and Rivera traveled to Cannes, France, and Italy, where they made promotional appearances.

In December 2006, Conner should have celebrated her 21st birthday with a special event held at Pure Nightclub at Caesars Palace on the Las Vegas Strip near Las Vegas, Nevada, but the event was later canceled because of the ongoing scandal.

Following her time in a rehabilitation center in Pennsylvania during December and January, Conner returned to the public stage in February and was interviewed by a number of news outlets. She made her first public appearance on February 4, 2007, when she, Katie Blair and Zuleyka Rivera appeared as models for Tadashi, a sponsor of the pageant, at a fashion show in New York City. She also appeared in the television show Pageant Place, where she confronted Katie Blair over rumours.

== Controversy ==
On December 14, 2006, controversy erupted when TMZ.com published an article saying that Conner might be dethroned as Miss USA for her behavior in several New York City bars. The next day, the website reported that Conner would be stripped of her crown, and that first runner-up Tamiko Nash, who completed her reign as Miss California USA in October, would inherit the Miss USA title. This was neither confirmed nor denied by the Miss Universe Organization.

The December 16, 2006, edition of the New York Daily News reported Conner had tested positive for cocaine, had kissed Miss Teen USA Katie Blair in public, and had sneaked men into their Trump Place apartment. One New York City nightlife veteran said, "She really is a small-town girl. She just went wild when she came to the city. Tara just couldn't handle herself. They were sneaking those guys in and out of the apartment."

According to Fox News, citing New York newspapers, Conner "moved out of her apartment in one of Trump's luxury buildings on Manhattan's Upper West Side" sometime during the week of December 11, 2006. On December 19, the day after her 21st birthday, Trump said at a press conference that Conner had not been dethroned. "I've always been a believer in second chances", he said, citing his brother's death tied to alcoholism. Had Conner been dethroned, she would have been the first Miss USA to lose her title since Mary Leona Gage in 1957. It was announced that Conner would enter Caron Treatment Centers, a Pennsylvania drug rehabilitation residential treatment center.

During the press conference, Conner declined to comment on allegations of illicit drug use. She said she was not an alcoholic but acknowledged making serious mistakes. After coming out of rehab in February 2007, Conner said in an interview with Matt Lauer that she had abused cocaine and anti-depressants. She was also interviewed on Larry King Live.

Conner currently serves as a Public Advocacy Consultant for Caron Treatment Centers, sharing her journey of recovery with others and being an advocate for those whose lives have been affected by addiction.

== Pageant Place and beyond ==
Conner appeared on the 2007 MTV reality show Pageant Place as the surprise fourth roommate to the 2007 Miss Universe Organization pageant winners Miss Universe Riyo Mori, Miss USA Rachel Smith, and Miss Teen USA Hilary Cruz as they live together in an apartment in New York City. The series premiered on October 10, 2007, and during this episode Donald Trump revealed that Katie Blair had been the one who had turned in Conner for alcohol and drug abuse because she felt that Conner was trying to steal Blair's boyfriend Josh.

For MTV's Spring Break 2008, Conner appeared with comedian Dan Levy in Pretty Smart, a competition challenging contestants to figure out who among a group of attractive men and women also "offers more than just a pretty face" and has "a brain to match".

She was a contestant on the third season of CMT's Gone Country, which premiered in January 2009. She hosted the first and only season of MTV's The Girls of Hedsor Hall, which premiered in February 2009. She also was a judge at the Miss USA 2010 pageant, held on May 16, 2010.

Conner currently co-hosts Kaboom, a web video show dedicated to showing things getting blown up.

She visited Syosset High School on June 6, 2013, to talk to graduating seniors about the effects of substance abuse.

She was Field Host on Amazing America with Sarah Palin, which aired on the Sportsman Channel.

Awards and achievements
Preceded by (Venezuela) Mónica Spear	Miss Universe fourth Runner-up; 2006	Succeeded by (United States) Rachel Smith
Preceded by Chelsea Cooley	Miss USA; 2006	Succeeded by Rachel Smith
Preceded by Kristen Johnson	Miss Kentucky USA; 2006	Succeeded by Michelle Banzer
Preceded by Marianna Zaslavsky	Miss Teen USA second Runner-up; 2002	Succeeded by Alicia Jaros
Preceded by Katherine Faulkner	Miss Kentucky Teen USA; 2002	Succeeded by Amanda Nunneley
