= Miss Kentucky USA =

Beauty pageant competition

- Formation: 1952; 74 years ago
- Type: Beauty pageant
- Headquarters: Cincinnati
- Location: Ohio
- Members: Miss USA
- Official language: English
- Key people: Melissa Proctor-Pitchford (State Pageant Director)
- Website: Official website

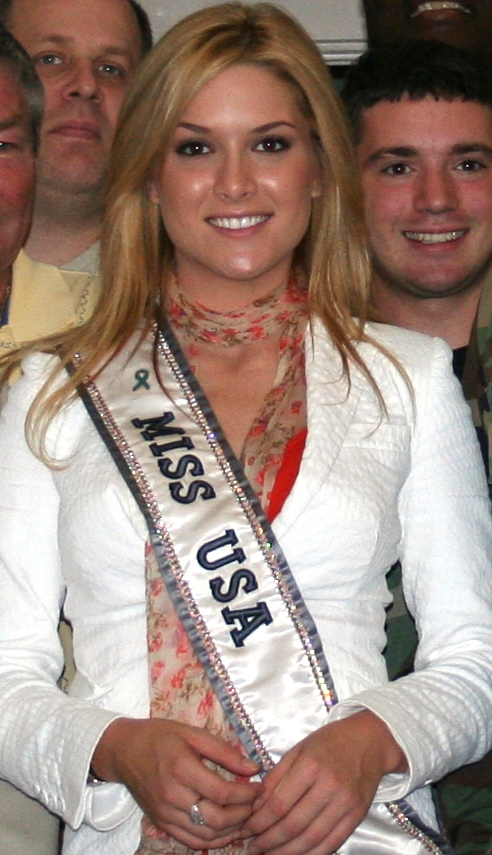
Tara Conner, Miss Kentucky USA 2006 & Miss USA 2006

The Miss Kentucky USA competition is the pageant that selects the representative for the state of Kentucky in the Miss USA pageant. It is currently directed by Proctor Productions and it was formerly directed by Connie Clark Harrison, Miss Kentucky USA 1976.

Tara Conner became the first Kentucky delegate to win Miss USA, after being crowned Miss USA 2006. She later finished as fourth runner-up at Miss Universe 2006. Elle Smith later became the second Kentucky delegate to win Miss USA, being crowned Miss USA 2021.

Four Miss Kentucky USA titleholders have also held the Miss Kentucky Teen USA title and competed at Miss Teen USA, including Conner. Two Miss Kentucky USA titleholders have also competed at Miss America, with one representing Wyoming.

Brijet Finister of Stockton, California, was appointed Miss Kentucky USA 2026 on June 30, 2026, after the open casting call from Thomas Brodeur, the new owner of the national pageant. She will represent Kentucky at Miss USA 2026.

== Media coverage ==
In 2006, it was reported that Miss Kentucky USA 2002, Elizabeth Arnold, was in a relationship with celebrity Nick Lachey. That same year Tara Conner became the first Kentucky delegate to win the Miss USA title, putting Kentucky in the top five for the second consecutive year, after Kristen Johnson placed 2nd runner-up in 2005. She later came under intense scrutiny when it was revealed that she had been drinking underage, tested positive for the use of cocaine, and kissed Miss Teen USA Katie Blair, among other things. Conner was allowed to keep her title, but was ordered into rehab for one month. After her rehab session, she resumed her reign until her year was completed.

In 2008, Miss Kentucky USA Alysha Harris was involved in an incident involving photos in which she was photographed dancing with New England Patriots wide receiver Randy Moss in a manner some saw as sexually suggestive.

== Results summary ==
=== Placements ===
- Miss USA: Tara Conner (2006), Elle Smith (2021)
- 1st runners-up: Connor Perry (2024)
- 2nd runners-up: Kristen Johnson (2005)
- 3rd runners-up: Julie Andrus (1965)
- 4th runners-up: Johanna Reid (1964), Patricia Barnstable (1971), Lisa Devillez (1980), Kristina Chapman (1982), Maria Montgomery (2009)
- Top 6: Tiffany Tenfelde (1990), Angela Hines (1992)
- Top 11/12: Carol Wallace (1975), Mitzi Jones (1995), Katie George (2015)
- Top 15/20: Mary Ann Stice (1953), Marcia Chumbler (1961), Brijet Finister (2026)

Kentucky holds a record of 18 placements at Miss USA.

=== Awards ===
- Miss Congeniality: Julia Pinkley (1968), Connie Clark (1976), Kia Hampton (2011)
- Miss Photogenic: Robyn Overbey (1985)
- Best State Costume: Charlesy Gulick (1974)

== Winners ==
Color key

- Declared as Winner
- Ended as runner-up
- Ended as one of the finalists or semifinalists

Year	Name	Hometown	Age^{1}	Local title	Placement at Miss USA	Special awards at Miss USA	Notes
2026	Brijet Finister	Stockton, CA	36		Top 20		
2025	Mattie Barker	Bowling Green	22	Miss Run For The Roses			Previously Miss Kentucky Teen USA 2020
2024	Connor Perry	Lexington	23	Miss Heart of Lexington	1st Runner-up		
2023	Madalyne Cassady Kinnett	Lexington	22	Miss Greater Lexington			
2022	Elizabeth "Lizzy" Neutz	Louisville	23	Miss Greater Louisville			
2021	Ellen Elizabeth "Elle" Smith	Louisville	23	Miss Germantown	Miss USA 2021		Top 10 at Miss Universe 2021
2020	Alexis Marie "Lexie" Iles	Louisville	24	Miss Louisville			Previously Miss Ohio Teen United States 2016 (top 15 at Miss Teen United States 2016)
2019	Jordan Weiter	Louisville	22	Miss Bluegrass			
2018	Braea Tilford	Louisville	25	Miss Jefferson County			
2017	Madelynne Myers	Louisville	22	Miss Louisville			
2016	Kyle Hornback	Louisville	20	Miss Louisville			
2015	Katie George	Louisville	21	Miss Louisville	Top 11		Advanced to top 11 as fan vote winner
2014	Destin Kincer	Whitesburg	21	Miss Keeneland			
2013	Allie Leggett	McCreary County	19	Miss Lake Cumberland			December 2017 Playboy Playmate of the Month
2012	Amanda Mertz	Louisville	25	Miss Louisville			Monster Energy Girl
2011	Kia Hampton	Louisville	21			Miss Congeniality	Later Pussycat Dolls member
2010	Kindra Clark	Mt. Washington	19				
2009	Maria Montgomery	Danville	19		4th runner-up		
2008	Alysha Harris	Carrollton	20				Later represented Kentucky at Miss United States International 2020
2007	Michelle Banzer	Louisville	24				First minority woman to win state pageant
2006	Tara Conner	Russell Springs	20		Miss USA 2006		Previously Miss Kentucky Teen USA 2002 (2nd runner-up & Best in Swimsuit at Miss Teen USA 2002); 4th runner-up at Miss Universe 2006
2005	Kristen Johnson	Slaughters	23		2nd runner-up		Previously Miss Kentucky Teen USA 2000 (2nd runner-up & Miss Photogenic at Miss Teen USA 2000); Contestant on Fear Factor in 2005 on the Miss USA episode #5.29
2004	Lauren Stengel	Louisville	22				
2003	Lori Mitchell	Scottsville	21				Reporter for WRCB in Chattanooga
2002	Elizabeth Ann "Lizzie" Arnold	Columbia	24				Previously Miss Kentucky Teen USA 1998; Appears on The Real Housewives of Orange County
2001	Jo Pritchard	Hardin	20				
2000	Jolene Youngster	Glasgow	18				
1999	Lori Menshouse	Ashland	25				Previously Miss Kentucky 1997
1998	Nancy Bradley	Franklin	23				
1997	Rachyl Hoskins	Liberty	22				
1996	Lorie Bennett West	Campbellsville	22				
1995	Mitzi Jones	White Plains	22		Semi-finalist, finishing in 8th Place		
1994	Kim Buford	Paducah	26				
1993	Karen Gibson	Kevil					
1992	Angela Hines	Maysville			Finalist, finishing in 5th place		
1991	Susan Farris	Benton	24			Runner-up state costume	
1990	Tiffany Tenfelde	Lakeside Park			Top 6 finalist		
1989	Veronica Hensley	Danville					
1988	Suzanne Pitman	Murray					
1987	Beth Ann Clark	Mayfield	21				Guinness Beer Spokesmodel, Swimwear Illustrated Cover Model of the Year 1989, Mrs. Kentucky United States 1999, Mrs. Georgia America 2001
1986	Jackie Taylor	Paducah					
1985	Robyn Key Overbey	Calvert City	24			Miss Photogenic	1st runner-up at Miss World USA 1979
1984	Tammy Melendez	Murray	24				
1983	Lee Ann Austin	Benton					
1982	Kristina Leah Chapman	Owensboro	19		4th runner-up		
1981	Denise Gibbs	Paducah					
1980	Lisa Louise Devillez	Owensboro	19	Miss Owensboro Hydrofair	4th runner-up		
1979	Linda Passmore	Hopkinsville					
1978	Linda Woodruff	Louisville					
1977	Sandy Smith	Princeton					
1976	Connie Clark	Benton				Miss Congeniality	Former director of the Miss Kentucky USA and Miss Kentucky Teen USA pageants under her married name, Connie Clark-Harrison
1975	Carol June Wallace	Somerset	23		Semi-finalist		Later Miss Wyoming 1976, mother of Miss Kentucky 2002, Mary Catherine Correll
1974	Charlesy Gulick	Williamstown				Best State Costume	
1973	Nancy Jane Coplen	Mayfield					
1972	Tamara Branstetter	Summer Shade					
1971	Patricia Barnstable	Louisville			4th runner-up		
1970	Joanna Smith	Morgantown					
1969	Regina Pryor						
1968	Julia Kay Pinkley					Miss Congeniality	
1967	Debbie Dibble						
1966	Jennifer Burcham						
1965	Julie Andrus	Mayfield			3rd runner-up		
1964	Johanna Reid				4th runner-up		
1963	Mary Ann Arnold						
1962	Sally Margaret Carter	Lowes					
1961	Marcia Chumbler	Mayfield			Semi-finalist		
1960	Barbara Joan Lovins						
1959	Sherree Owens						
1958	Shannon Beasley						
1955-57	Did not compete						
1954	Nikki Horner						
1953	Mary Stice				Semi-finalist		
1952	Jean Tingle						

^{1} Age at the time of the Miss Kentucky USA pageant
