= Miss Universe 2006 =

55th Miss Universe pageant

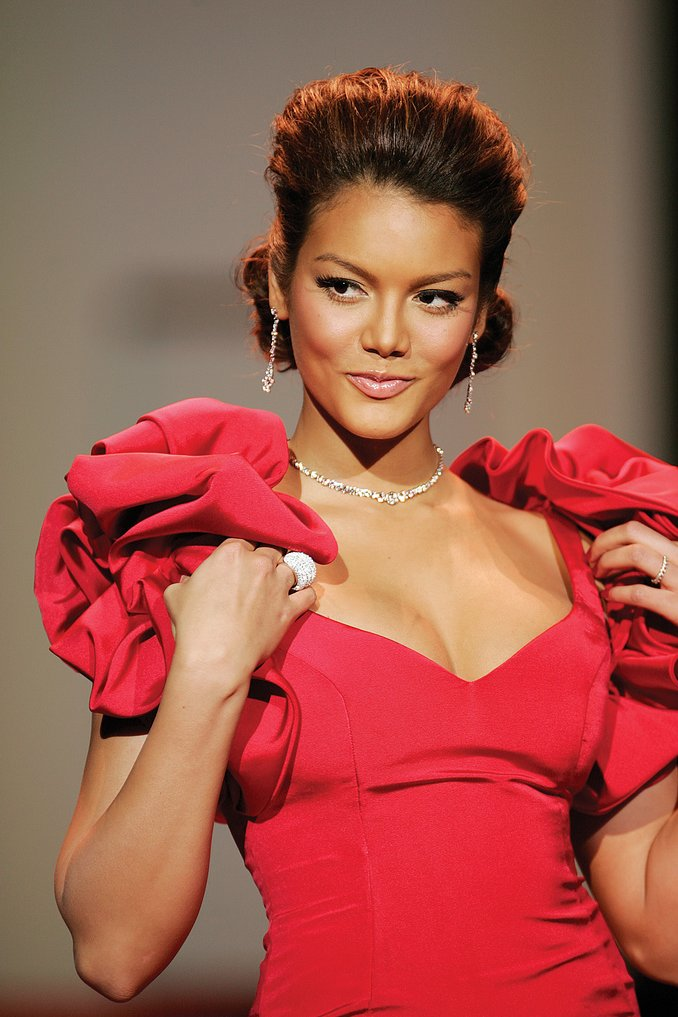
- Zuleyka Rivera
- Date: July 23, 2006
- Presenters: Carlos Ponce; Nancy O'Dell; Carson Kressley; Shandi Finnessey
- Entertainment: Chelo; Vittorio Grigolo
- Venue: Shrine Auditorium, Los Angeles, California, United States
- Broadcaster: NBC (KNBC); Telemundo (KVEA)
- Entrants: 86
- Placements: 20
- Debuts: Kazakhstan
- Withdrawals: Barbados; Belize; Curaçao; Italy; Kenya; Netherlands; Vietnam
- Returns: Argentina; Cayman Islands; Estonia; Ghana; Iceland; New Zealand; Northern Mariana Islands; Saint Lucia; Saint Vincent and the Grenadines; Sint Maarten; Sweden
- Winner: Zuleyka Rivera; Puerto Rico
- Congeniality: Angela Asare; Ghana
- Best National Costume: Kurara Chibana; Japan
- Photogenic: Lia Ramos; Philippines

Miss Universe 2006 was the 55th Miss Universe pageant, held at the Shrine Auditorium in Los Angeles, California, United States on July 23, 2006.

At the conclusion of the event, Natalie Glebova of Canada crowned Zuleyka Rivera of Puerto Rico as Miss Universe 2006. It is Puerto Rico's fifth victory in the pageant's history. After the show, Rivera passed out due to the weight of her dress but quickly recovered.

Contestants from eighty-six countries and territories competed in this year's pageant, surpassing the previous record of 84 contestants in 1999. The pageant was hosted by Carlos Ponce and Nancy O'Dell, with Queer Eye's Carson Kressley and Miss USA 2004 Shandi Finnessey providing commentary and analysis throughout the event. American singer-rapper Chelo and Italian operatic tenor Vittorio Grigolo performed in this year's pageant.

== Background ==
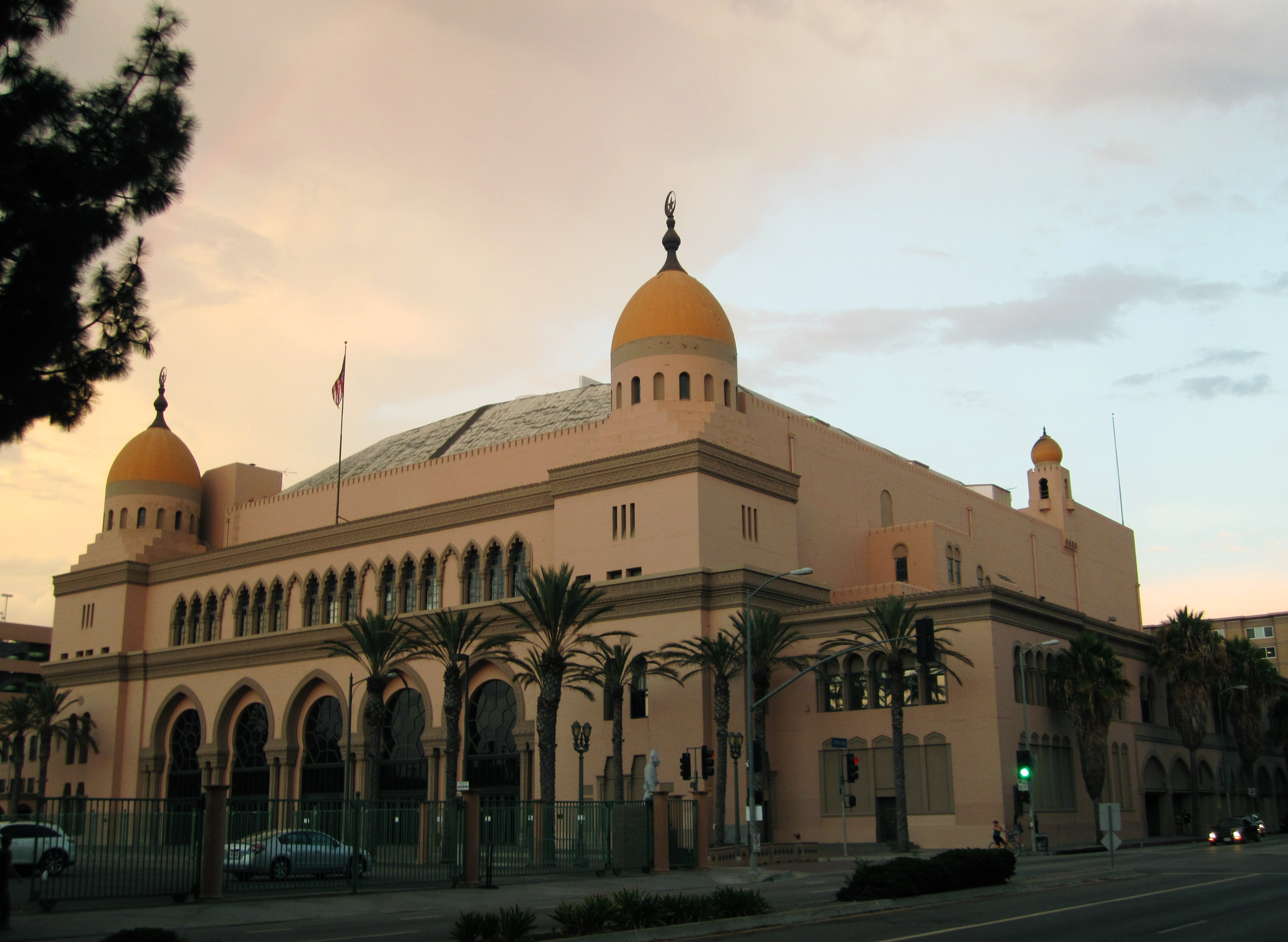
Shrine Auditorium, Los Angeles, venue for Miss Universe 2006

=== Location and date ===
Due to the lack of interest of several cities from hosting the pageant, the Miss Universe Organization decided to hold the pageant in July instead of May. The Miss Universe Organization confirmed that the 2006 edition will be held at the Shrine Auditorium in Los Angeles, California on July 23, 2006. It is the first time in eight years that pageant took place in the United States. The last time that the United States hosted the pageant was in 1998 in Honolulu, Hawaii.

=== Selection of participants ===
Contestants from eighty-six countries and territories were selected to compete in the pageant. Three contestants were appointed to their position after being a runner-up of their national pageant, or to replace the original dethroned winner.

==== Replacements ====
Suada Sherfi, Miss Albania 2005, was supposed to represent her country at Miss Universe. However, Sherfi withdrew after declining the request of photographer Fadil Berisha to reduce the size of her nose. Sherfi was replaced by Eralda Hitaj. Gao Ying Hui, the first runner-up of Miss Universe China 2006, was appointed to represent China at Miss Universe after Qi Fang, Miss Universe China 2006, was dethroned after violating the rules in her contract.

==== Debuts, returns and withdrawals ====
This edition marked the debut of Kazakhstan, and the returns of Argentina, the Cayman Islands, Estonia, Ghana, Iceland, New Zealand, the Northern Mariana Islands, Saint Lucia, Saint Vincent and the Grenadines, Sint Maarten, and Sweden. Saint Lucia last competed in 1977; Iceland last competed in 1997; Sint Maarten last competed in 2000; the Northern Mariana Islands last competed in 2002; Argentina and New Zealand last competed in 2003; while the others last competed in 2004. Barbados, Belize, Curaçao, Italy, Kenya, the Netherlands, and Vietnam withdrew after their respective organizations failed to hold a national competition or appoint a delegate.

Silva Shahakian of Iraq was set to compete at Miss Universe. However, Shahakian withdrew after hiding from Islamic militants who reportedly threatened to kill her along with other contestants who competed in the Miss Iraq pageant.

== Results ==
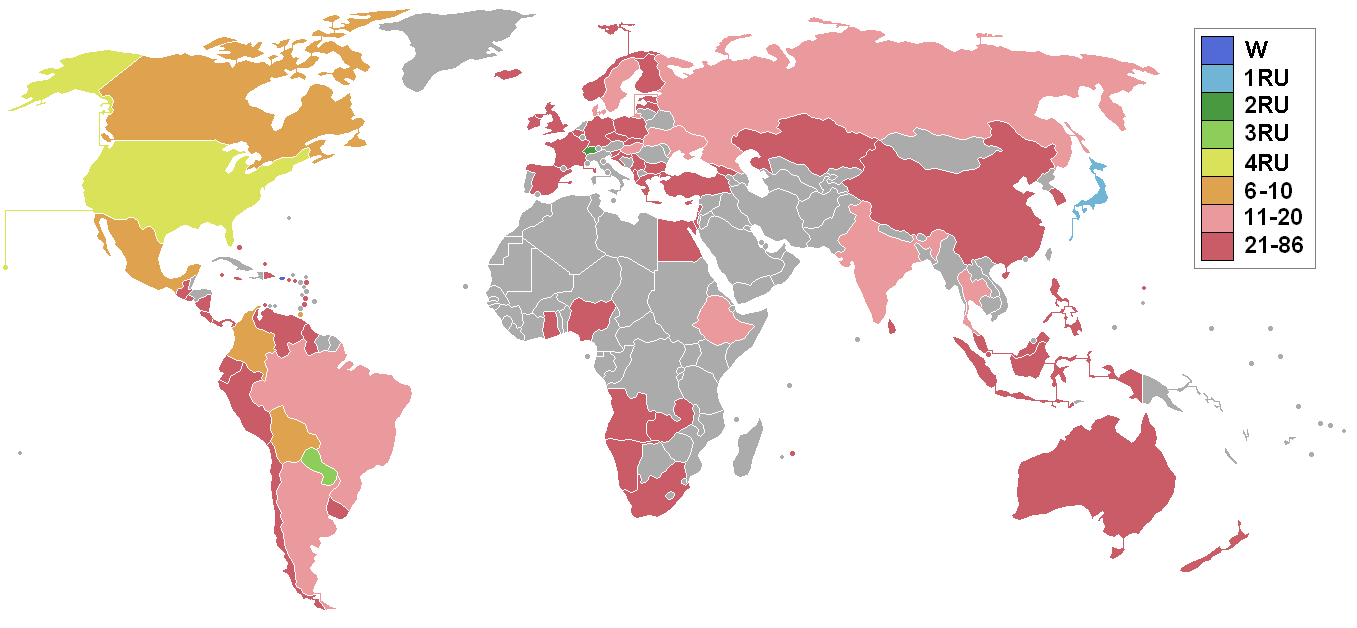
Miss Universe 2006 participating countries and territories.

=== Placements ===
Placement	Contestant
Miss Universe 2006	Puerto Rico – Zuleyka Rivera
1st Runner-Up	Japan – Kurara Chibana
2nd Runner-Up	Switzerland – Lauriane Gilliéron
3rd Runner-Up	Paraguay – Lourdes Arévalos
4th Runner-Up	United States – Tara Conner
Top 10	Bolivia – Desirée Durán; Canada – Alice Panikian; Colombia – Valerie Domínguez; Mexico – Priscila Perales; Trinidad and Tobago – Kenisha Thom
Top 20	Argentina – Magalí Romitelli; Brazil – Rafaela Zanella; Denmark – Betina Faurbye; Ethiopia – Dina Fekadu; Hungary – Adrienn Bende; India – Neha Kapur; Russia – Anna Litvinova; Sweden – Josephine Alhanko; Thailand – Charm Osathanond; Ukraine – Inna Tsymbalyuk

=== Special awards ===
Award	Contestant
Miss Congeniality	Ghana – Angela Asare
Miss Photogenic	Philippines – Lia Ramos
Best National Costume	Japan – Kurara Chibana

== Pageant ==
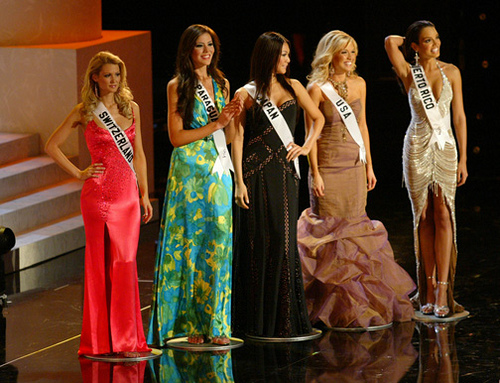
The five finalists of Miss Universe 2006

=== Format ===
The Miss Universe Organization introduced several specific changes to the format for this edition. The number of semifinalists was increased to 20 instead of the traditional 15. This is due to the host city not paying for the promotion, which spared the telecast by seven minutes. 20 semifinalists were chosen through the preliminary competition— composed of the swimsuit and evening gown competitions and closed-door interviews. The top 20 competed in the swimsuit competition and were narrowed down to the top 10 afterward. The top 10 competed in the evening gown competition and were narrowed down to the top 5 afterward.

=== Selection committee ===
==== Final telecast ====
- James Lesure – Actor from NBC's Las Vegas
- Claudia Jordan – Model for Deal or No Deal; former Miss Rhode Island USA and Miss Rhode Island Teen USA
- Sean Yazbeck – Winner of season 5 of The Apprentice
- Amelia Vega – Miss Universe 2003 from Dominican Republic
- Emmitt Smith – Former Dallas Cowboys player and Dancing with the Stars winner
- Marc Cherry – American writer and producer
- Tom Green – Actor and comedian
- María Celeste Arrarás – Telemundo host
- Patrick McMullan – Fashion photographer
- Bridgette Wilson – Miss Teen USA 1990 from Oregon
- Santino Rice – Project Runway finalist

Note: Actress Bo Derek was scheduled to be a judge but was later replaced.

== Contestants ==
Eighty-six contestants competed for the title.

Country/Territory	Contestant	Age (Note: Ages at the time of the pageant)	Hometown
Albania	Eralda Hitaj	19	Tirana
Angola	Isménia Júnior	22	Cabinda
Antigua and Barbuda	Shari McEwan	18	Ottos
Argentina	Magalí Romitelli	18	Villa María
Aruba	Melissa Laclé	20	Santa Cruz
Australia	Erin McNaught	24	Brisbane
(The Bahamas) Bahamas	Samantha Carter	24	Nassau
Belgium	Tatiana Silva	21	Brussels
Bolivia	Desiree Durán	20	Santa Cruz
Brazil	Rafaela Zanella	19	Santa Maria
Bulgaria	Galena Dimova	24	Sofia
Canada	Alice Panikian	20	Toronto
Cayman Islands	Ambuyah Ebanks	21	West Bay
Chile	Belén Montilla	23	Santiago
China	Gao Ying Hui	23	Harbin
Colombia	Valerie Domínguez	25	Barranquilla
Costa Rica	Fabriella Quesada	22	Colón
Croatia	Biljana Mančić	20	Split
Cyprus	Elena Ierodiakonou	22	Kalymnos
Czech Republic	Renata Langmannová	19	Ivanovice na Hané
Denmark	Betina Faurbye	24	Copenhagen
Dominican Republic	Mía Taveras	20	Santo Domingo
Ecuador	Catalina López	23	Guayaquil
Egypt	Fawzia Mohamed	23	Cairo
El Salvador	Rebeca Iraheta	18	San Salvador
Estonia	Kirke Klemmer	22	Tallinn
Ethiopia	Dina Fekadu	21	Wollega
Finland	Ninni Laaksonen	20	Helsinki
France	Alexandra Rosenfeld	19	Languedoc
(Georgia (country)) Georgia	Ekaterine Buadze	20	Tbilisi
Germany	Natalie Ackermann	26	Wesel
Ghana	Angela Asare	20	Accra
Greece	Olympia Chopsonidou	23	Thessaloniki
Guatemala	Jackelinne Piccinini	22	Mazatenango
Guyana	Alana Ernest	19	Mahdia
Hungary	Adrienn Bende	21	Budapest
Iceland	Sif Aradóttir	21	Keflavík
India	Neha Kapur	23	New Delhi
Indonesia	Nadine Chandrawinata	21	Jakarta
(Republic of Ireland) Ireland	Melanie Boreham	19	Drumbeg
Israel	Anastacia Entin	21	Tel Aviv
Jamaica	Cindy Wright	20	Stony Hill
Japan	Kurara Chibana	24	Naha
Kazakhstan	Dina Nuraliyeva	21	Shymkent
Latvia	Sanita Kubliņa	22	Sigulda
Lebanon	Gabrielle Bou Rached	20	Beirut
Malaysia	Melissa Tan	25	Petaling Jaya
Mauritius	Isabelle Antoo	25	Beau Bassin-Rose Hill
Mexico	Priscila Perales	23	Monterrey
Namibia	Anna Nashandi	22	Windhoek
New Zealand	Elizabeth Gray	23	Auckland
Nicaragua	Cristiana Frixione	22	Managua
Nigeria	Tienepre Oki	21	Warri
Northern Mariana Islands	Shequita Bennett	19	Kagman
Norway	Martine Jonassen	19	Tjøme
Panama	María Alessandra Mezquita	22	Panama City
Paraguay	Lourdes Arévalos	22	San Lorenzo
Peru	Fiorella Viñas	22	Lima
Philippines	Lia Ramos	25	Davao City
Poland	Francys Sudnicka	26	Masovia
Puerto Rico	Zuleyka Rivera	18	Salinas
Russia	Anna Litvinova	24	Kemerovo Oblast
Saint Lucia	Sascha Andrew-Rose	20	Rodney Bay
Saint Vincent and the Grenadines	Shivern Peters	21	Bequia
Serbia and Montenegro (Note: On 3 June 2006, the State Union of Serbia and Montenegro dissolved, with Serbia and Montenegro becoming separate countries. However, they still competed as a single country.)	Nada Milinić	18	Tivat
Singapore	Carol Cheong	25	Singapore
Sint Maarten	Gisella Hilliman	19	South Reward Hill
Slovakia	Judita Hrubyová	20	Bardejov
Slovenia	Nataša Pinoza	22	Sevnica
South Africa	Nokuthula Sithole	22	Gauteng
South Korea	Kim Joo-hee	25	Seoul
Spain	Elisabeth Reyes	21	Málaga
Sri Lanka	Jacqueline Fernandez	20	Colombo
Sweden	Josephine Alhanko	25	Stockholm
Switzerland	Lauriane Gilliéron	21	Prilly
Thailand	Charm Osathanond	19	Nonthaburi
Trinidad and Tobago	Kenisha Thom	22	Tunapuna–Piarco
Turkey	Ceyla Kirazlı	20	İzmir
Turks and Caicos Islands	Shaveena Been	24	Grand Turk
Ukraine	Inna Tsymbalyuk	21	Chernivtsi
United Kingdom	Julie Doherty	18	Manchester
United States	Tara Conner	20	Russell Springs
United States Virgin Islands	JeT'aime Cerge	22	Saint Thomas
Uruguay	Fatimih Dávila	18	La Cormilla
Venezuela	Jictzad Viña	23	Carúpano
Zambia	Mofya Chisenga	23	Mufulira
