= The Amazing Race 23 =

Season of television series

- Season 23
- Region 1 DVD cover
- Presented by: Phil Keoghan
- No. of teams: 11
- Winners: Jason Case & Amy Diaz
- No. of legs: 12
- Distance traveled: 35,000 mi (56,000 km)
- No. of episodes: 11

Release
- Original network: CBS
- Original release: September 29 – December 8, 2013

Additional information
- Filming dates: June 9 – July 2, 2013

Series chronology
- ← Previous; Season 22 Next → Season 24

The Amazing Race 23 is the twenty-third season of the American reality competition show The Amazing Race. Hosted by Phil Keoghan, it featured eleven teams of two, each with a pre-existing relationship, competing in a race around the world to win US$1,000,000. This season visited four continents and nine countries and traveled over 35,000 miles (56,000 km) during twelve legs. Starting in Santa Clarita, California, racers traveled through Chile, Portugal, Norway, Poland, Austria, the United Arab Emirates, Indonesia, and Japan before returning to the United States and finishing in Juneau. The season premiered on CBS on September 29, 2013, and concluded on December 8, 2013.

Dating couple Jason Case and Amy Diaz were the winners of this season, while exes Tim Sweeney and Marie Mazzocchi finished in second place, and married doctors Travis and Nicole Jasper finished in third place.

== Production ==
=== Development and filming ===
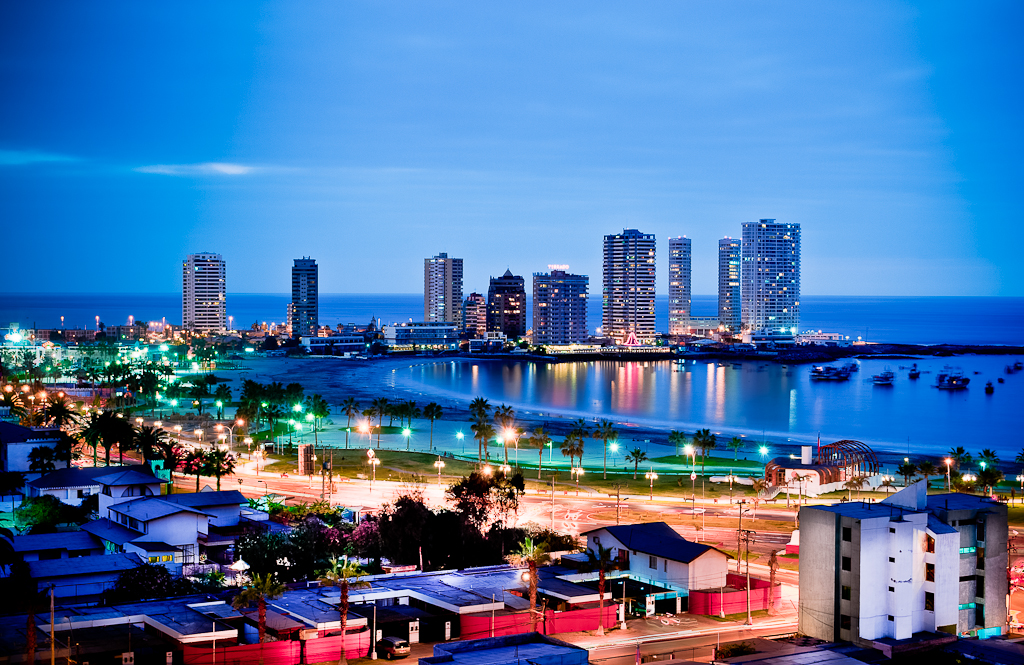
Iquique, Chile was the first destination in the 23rd season of The Amazing Race.

The season was renewed on March 27, 2013. A revised opening credits sequence and on-screen clue graphics were developed for this season along with an updated map using 3D blue marble layout.

Filming for this season began on June 9, 2013, with teams spotted checking into a Pit Stop in Iquique, Chile, the next day. On June 19, the show filmed in Gdańsk, Poland, with news reporting of an American production at Neptune's Fountain. The season spanned 35,000 miles (56,000 km) across four continents and nine countries. The Double Express Pass, introduced in the previous season, returned, where the first team to arrive at the Pit Stop on the first leg received two Express Passes: one for themselves and one to give to any other team.

== Contestants ==
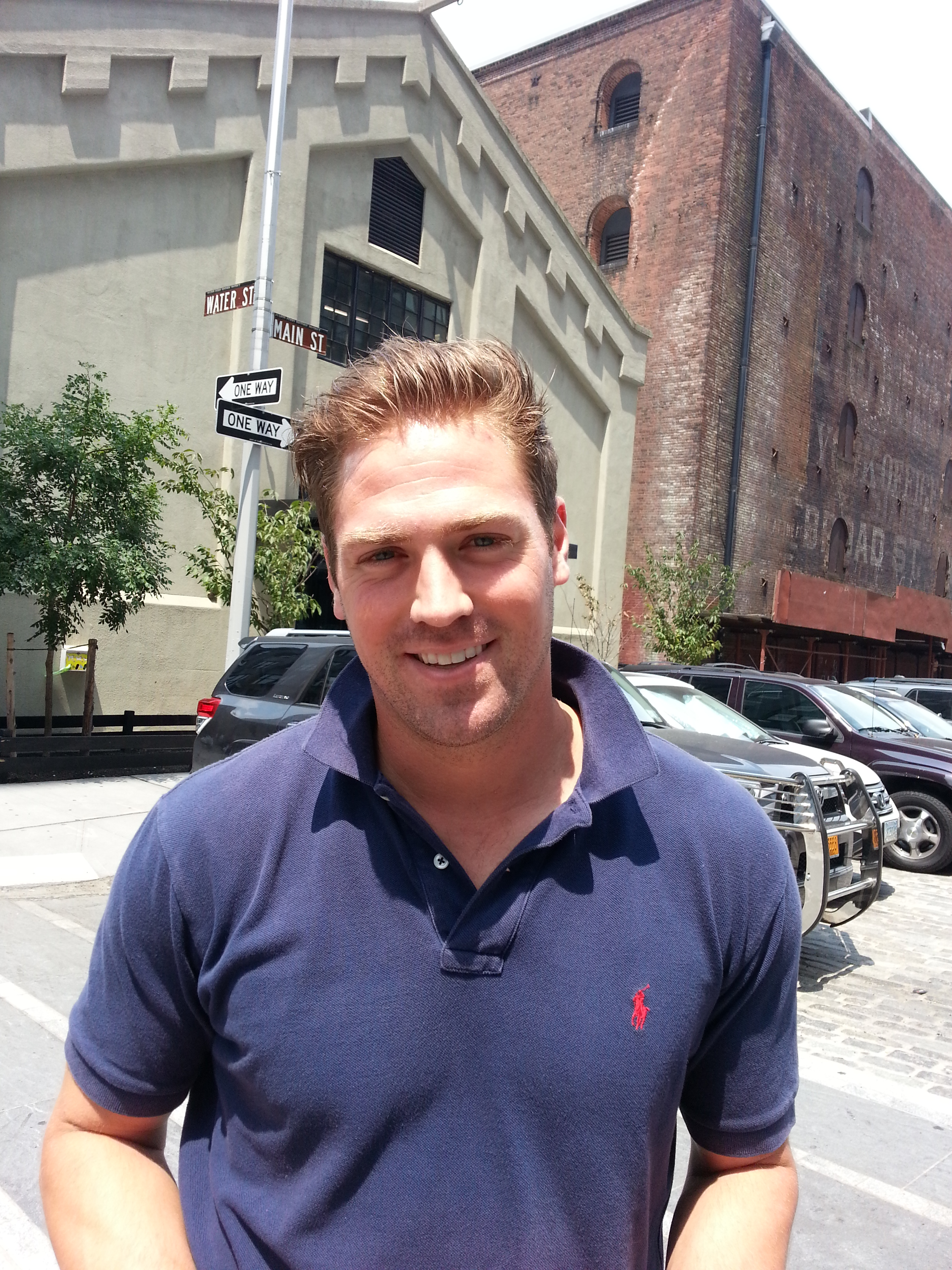
Tim Sweeney

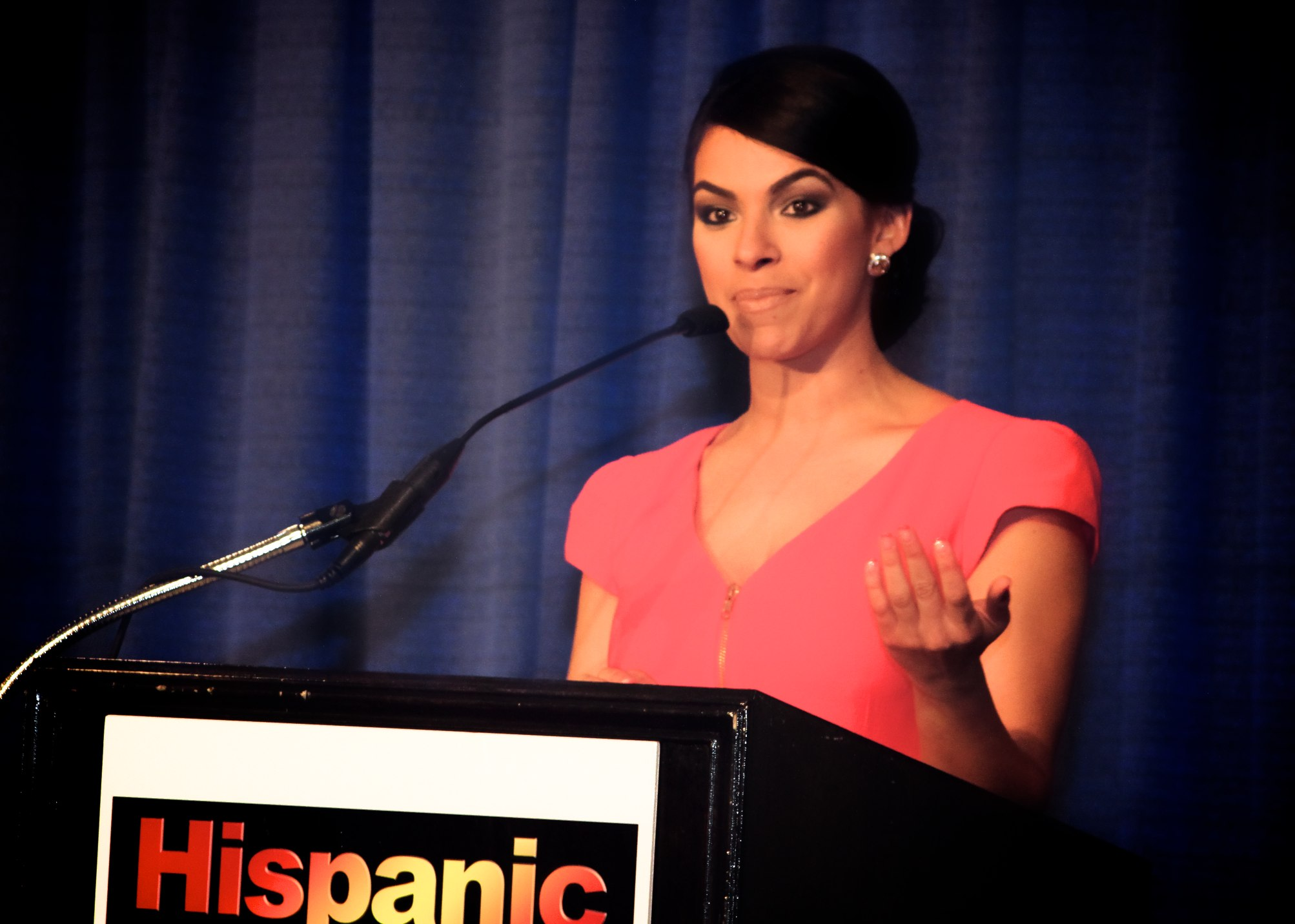
Amy Diaz

The cast included former Houston Texans players Chester Pitts and Ephraim Salaam, the wives of baseball players Chris Getz of the Kansas City Royals and David DeJesus of the Tampa Bay Rays, a pair of Los Angeles Kings Ice Crew maintenance workers, former Miss Rhode Island USA beauty queen Amy Diaz, former Minor League Baseball player Tim Sweeney and former Lingerie Football player Marie Mazzocchi, and a pair of theater performers from the stage comedy The Queen of Bingo. Married emergency room doctors Travis and Nicole Jasper have also appeared on the docudrama series Untold Stories of the E.R.

Contestants	Age	Relationship	Hometown	Status
Hoskote Venkatesh	60	Father & Daughter	Laguna Niguel, California	Eliminated 1st (in Iquique, Chile)
Naina Venkatesh	27	Father & Daughter	Laguna Niguel, California	Eliminated 1st (in Iquique, Chile)
Rowan Joseph	56	Theatre Performers	Charlotte, North Carolina	Eliminated 2nd (in San José de Maipo, Chile)
Shane Partlow	47	Theatre Performers	Charlotte, North Carolina	Eliminated 2nd (in San José de Maipo, Chile)
Chester Pitts II	33	Former NFL Teammates	Missouri City, Texas	Eliminated 3rd (in Lisbon, Portugal)
Ephraim Salaam	36	Former NFL Teammates	Studio City, California	Eliminated 3rd (in Lisbon, Portugal)
Brandon Squyres	34	Childhood Friends	Chico, California	Eliminated 4th (in Sopot, Poland)
Adam Switzer	34	Childhood Friends	Los Angeles, California	Eliminated 4th (in Sopot, Poland)
Tim Wiyninger	26	Best Friends	Cordell, Oklahoma	Eliminated 5th (in Vienna, Austria)
Danny Merkey	25	Best Friends	Cordell, Oklahoma	Eliminated 5th (in Vienna, Austria)
Nicky Getz	25	Baseball Wives	Kansas City, Missouri	Eliminated 6th (in Al Ain, United Arab Emirates)
Kim DeJesus	32	Baseball Wives	Chicago, Illinois	Eliminated 6th (in Al Ain, United Arab Emirates)
Ally Mello	22	NHL Ice Crew	Los Angeles, California	Eliminated 7th (in Lembang, Indonesia)
Ashley Covert	25	NHL Ice Crew	Los Angeles, California	Eliminated 7th (in Lembang, Indonesia)
Leo Temory	26	Cousins	Los Angeles, California	Eliminated 8th (in Tokyo, Japan)
Jamal Zadran	26	Cousins	Los Angeles, California	Eliminated 8th (in Tokyo, Japan)
Nicole Jasper	39	Married ER Doctors	Atlanta, Georgia	Third place
Travis Jasper	43	Married ER Doctors	Atlanta, Georgia	Third place
Tim Sweeney	32	Exes	Morristown, New Jersey	Runners-up
Marie Mazzocchi	29	Exes	Morristown, New Jersey	Runners-up
Jason Case	33	Dating	Attleboro, Massachusetts	Winners
Amy Diaz	29	Dating	Providence, Rhode Island	Winners

Future appearances

While the season was still airing, Tim & Marie and Leo & Jamal were invited to appear on The Amazing Race: All-Stars. The former declined the invitation, but the latter participated. Leo & Jamal also returned for a third time on The Amazing Race: Reality Showdown.

On May 25, 2016, Leo & Jamal appeared on an Amazing Race-themed primetime special of The Price Is Right. In 2022, Leo also competed on the first season of The Challenge: USA. In 2023, Ephraim Salaam competed on Raid the Cage.

== Results ==
The following teams are listed with their placements in each leg. Placements are listed in finishing order.

- A red placement with a dagger (†) indicates that the team was eliminated.
- An underlined blue placement with a double-dagger (‡) indicates that the team was the last to arrive at a Pit Stop in a non-elimination leg, and had to perform a Speed Bump task in the following leg.
- An italicized and underlined placement indicates that the team was the last to arrive at a Pit Stop, but there was no rest period at the Pit Stop and all teams were instructed to continue racing. There was no required Speed Bump task in the next leg.
- A purple ε indicates that the team used an Express Pass on that leg to bypass one of their tasks.
- A brown ⊃ indicates that the team used the U-Turn and a brown ⊂ indicates the team on the receiving end of the U-Turn.

Team placement (by leg)
Team	1	2	3	4	5	6	7	8	9	10	11	12
Jason & Amy	8th	5th	2nd	2nd	2nd	5th	2nd	2nd	3rd	1st	2nd	1st
Tim & Marie	1st	8th	8th	5th	1stε (Note: Tim & Marie used their Express Pass to bypass the Detour on this leg.)	4th	4th	3rd⊃ (Note: Tim & Marie chose to use the U-Turn on Nicky & Kim.)	2nd	2nd	1st	2nd
Nicole & Travis	2nd (Note: Nicole & Travis initially arrived 1st, but were issued a 30-minute penalty for taking a taxi to the Pit Stop when the clue explicitly stated that teams had to go on foot. Tim & Marie checked in during this penalty time, dropping Nicole & Travis to 2nd.)	4th	1st	3rd	3rd	1st	3rd	1st^{ε}_{⊃} (Note: Nicole & Travis used their Express Pass to bypass the Detour on this leg.) (Note: Nicole & Travis chose to use the U-Turn on Leo & Jamal.)	4th	3rd	3rd	3rd
Leo & Jamal	7th	2nd (Note: Leo & Jamal initially arrived 1st, but could not check in because they did not fully pay their cab fare. Chester & Ephraim checked in while Leo & Jamal went back to pay their driver, dropping Leo & Jamal to 2nd.)	6th	4th	6th^{⊂}_{⊃} (Note: Tim & Danny chose to use the U-Turn on Leo & Jamal.) (Note: Leo & Jamal chose to use the U-Turn on Brandon & Adam.)	3rd	1st	4th⊂	1st	4th‡	4th†	
Ally & Ashley	6th	7th	7th	7th	7th	6th	5th	5th	5th†			
Nicky & Kim	5th	9th	3rd	8th (Note: This team arrived last at the Pit Stop, but they were instructed to continue racing.)	4th	2nd	6th‡	6th†⊂				
Tim & Danny	9th	6th	4th	6th	5th⊃	7th†						
Brandon & Adam	10th	3rd	5th	1st	8th†⊂							
Chester & Ephraim	4th	1st	9th†									
Rowan & Shane	3rd	10th†										
Hoskote & Naina	11th†											

== Race summary ==
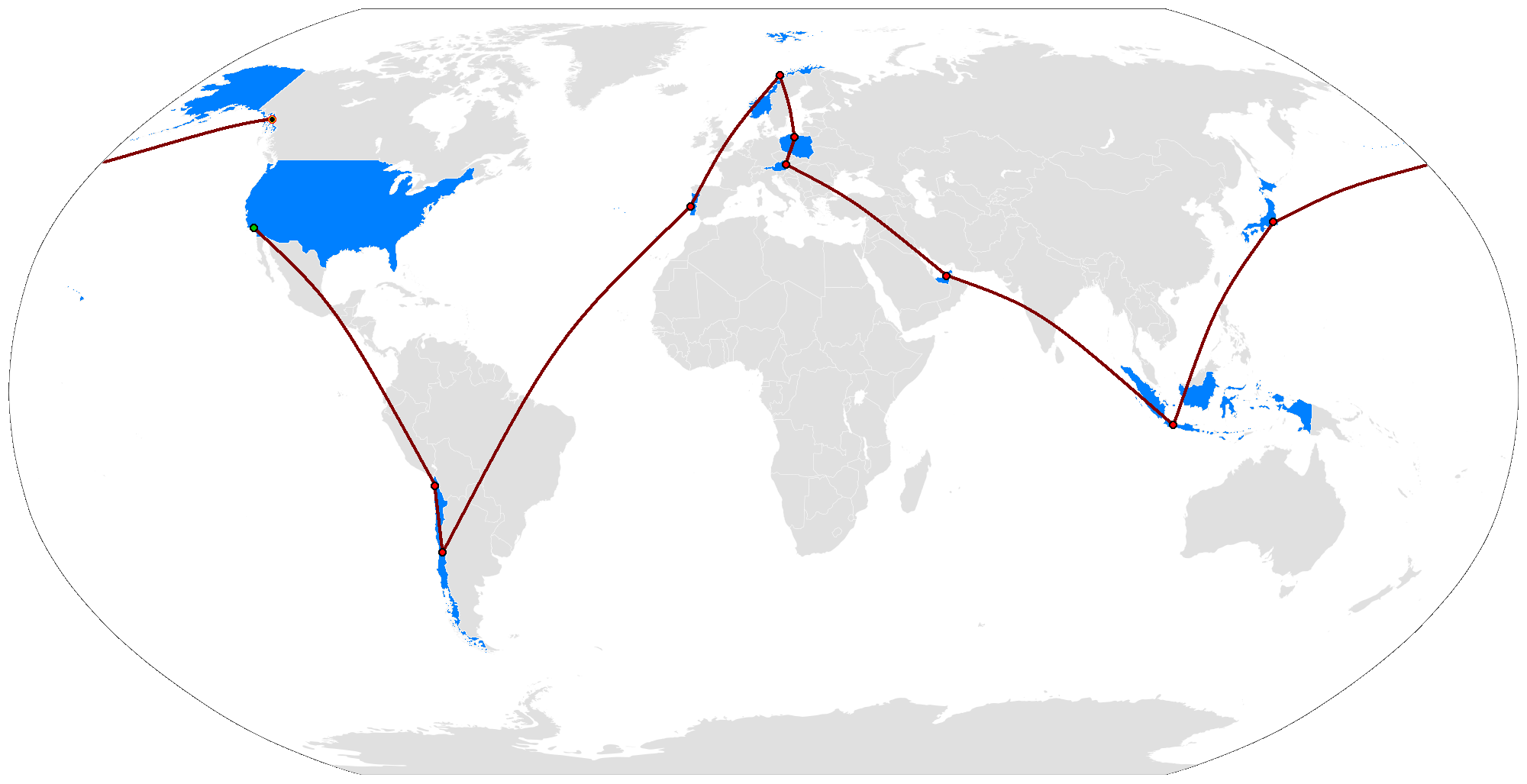
The route of The Amazing Race 23.

Destinations	Air travel Rail travel Water travel Bus travel Helicopter travel Bicycle travel Gondola travel
Route Markers	Detour Roadblock Fast Forward U-Turn Speed Bump Pit Stop

=== Leg 1 (United States → Chile) ===
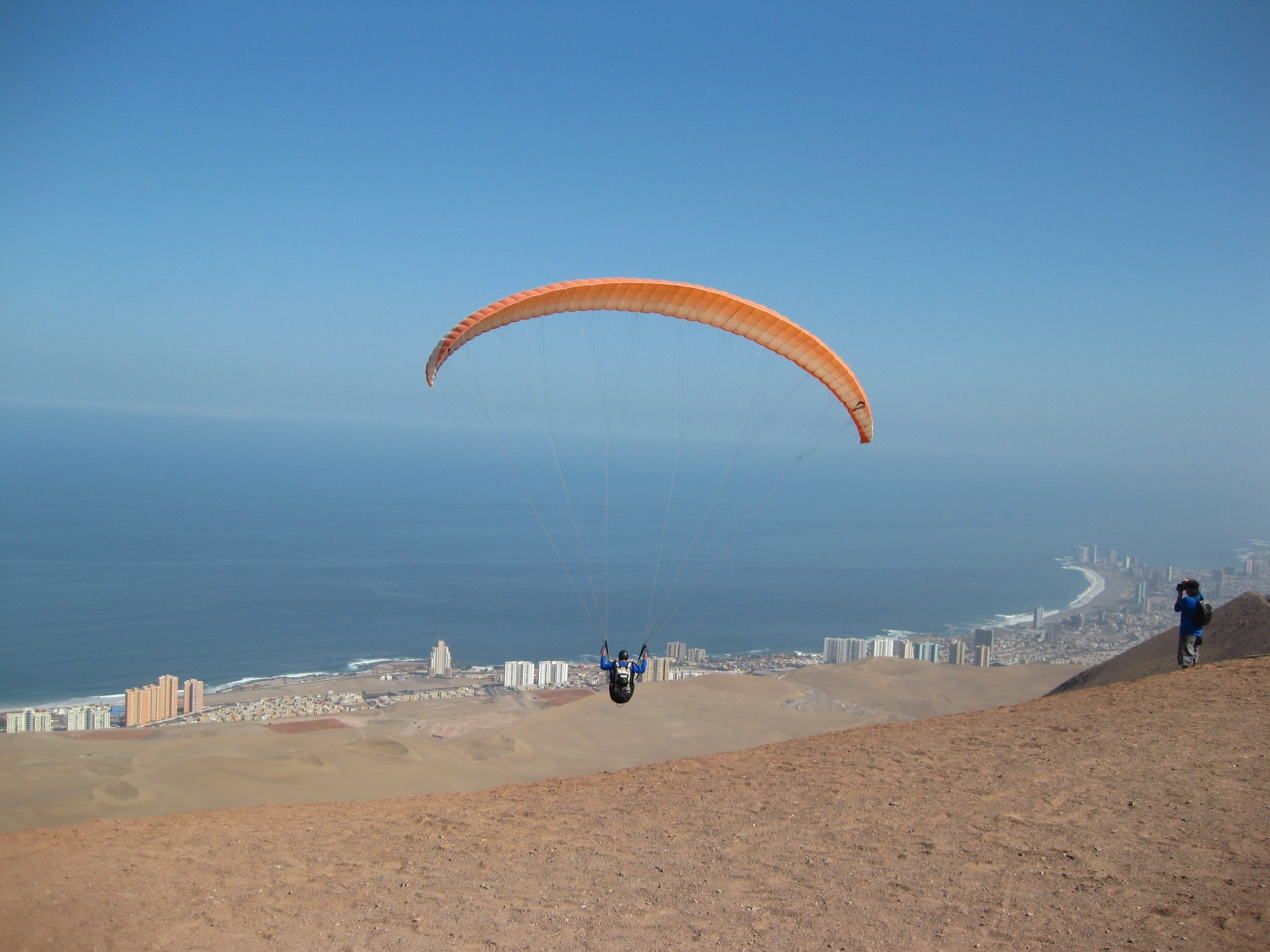
In the first Roadblock of The Amazing Race 23, one team member had to follow their partner, who paraglided down from Alto Hospicio to Iquique, Chile.

- Episode 1: "We're Not in Oklahoma No More" (September 29, 2013)
- Prize: Two Express Passes (awarded to Tim & Marie; one for themselves and the other to be given to another team)
- Eliminated: Hoskote & Naina

Locations

- Santa Clarita, California (Melody Ranch Motion Picture Studio) (Starting Line)
- Los Angeles → Iquique, Chile
- Alto Hospicio (Zona de Parapentes)
- Iquique (Muelle Prat)
- Iquique (Teatro Municipal de Iquique)

Episode summary

- At the Melody Ranch Motion Picture Studio, teams had to choose a vehicle and use the in-vehicle communication system to contact a man named Javier, who revealed their first destination: Iquique, Chile. Teams then drove to Los Angeles International Airport, where they booked one of two flights to Iquique, the first of which carried seven teams and arrived 2:30 hours before the second flight, which carried the remaining four teams. Once there, teams had travel to the Zona de Parapentes in Alto Hospicio and find Javier, who had their next clue.
- In this season's first Roadblock, one team member had to direct their taxi to follow their partner, who paraglided from Alto Hospicio down to either Playa Brava or Huayquique Beach. Once team members reunited on the beach, they received their next clue.
- After the first Roadblock, teams had to travel to Muelle Prat and find their next clue.
- In this leg's second Roadblock, the team member who paraglided in the previous Roadblock had to collect five fish from one of three boats, reaching them by rowboat, and then deliver them to a fishmonger in order to receive a postcard, which depicted their first Pit Stop. The three fishing boats each had a limited number of fish, so if a boat ran out of fish, racers had to find one of the other boats in order to get their remaining fish.
- After the second Roadblock, teams had to travel on foot to the Pit Stop: the Teatro Municipal de Iquique.

=== Leg 2 (Chile) ===
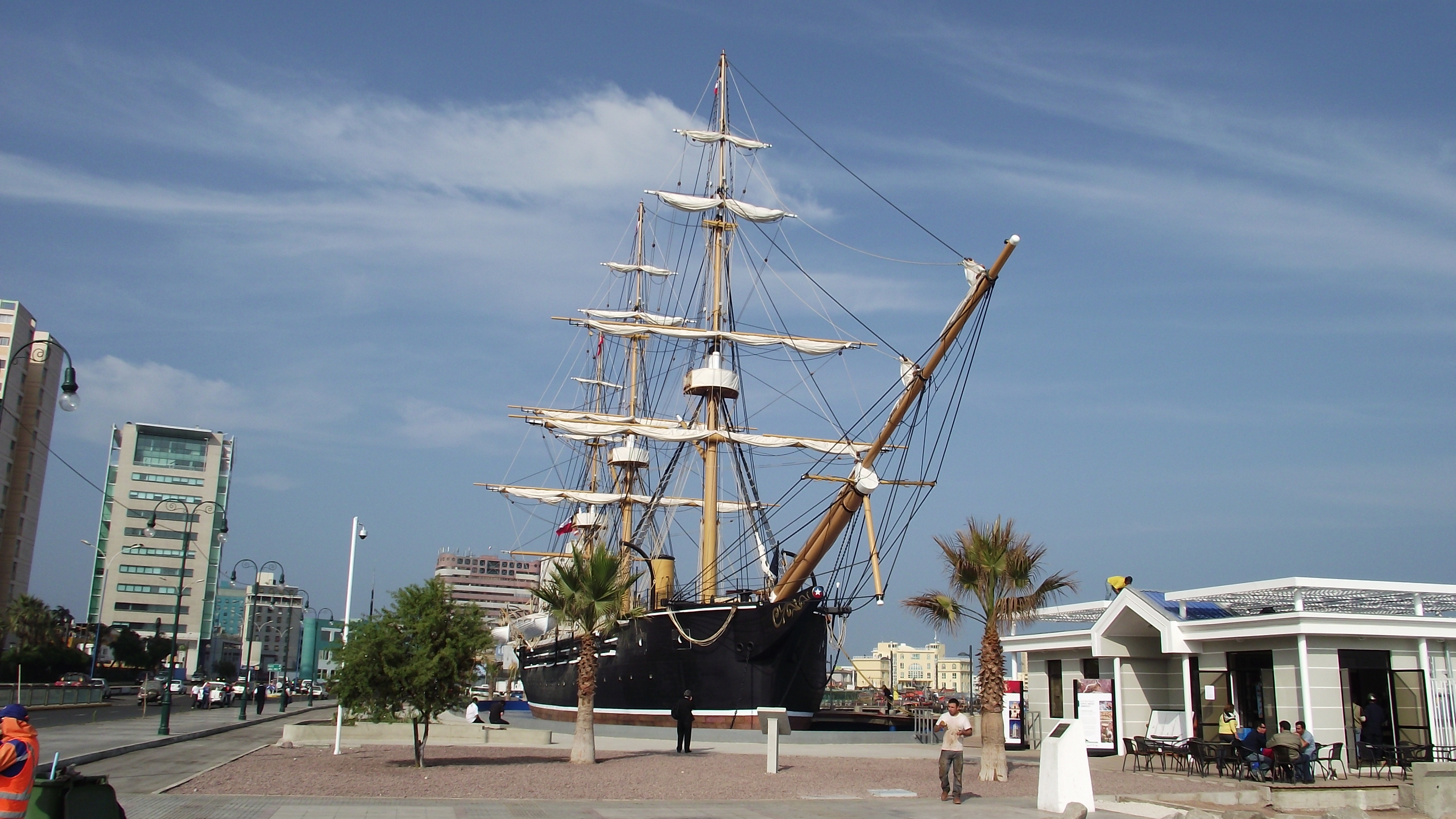
In Iquique, teams visited a recreation of the Chilean ship Esmeralda.

- Episode 2: "Zip It, Bingo" (October 6, 2013)
- Prize: A trip for two to the Turks and Caicos Islands (awarded to Chester & Ephraim)
- Eliminated: Rowan & Shane

Locations

- Iquique (Teatro Municipal de Iquique)
- Iquique (Museo Corbeta Esmeralda)
- Tarapacá Region (Atacama Desert – Irlanda 3 Road Sign)
- Tarapacá Region (Atacama Desert – Mina de Sal Punta de Lobos)
- Iquique → Santiago
- Santiago (Plaza de Armas)
- Santiago (Paseo Ahumada & Merced 738)
- San José de Maipo (Cascada de las Animas)

Episode summary

- At the start of this leg, teams had to find the Museo Corbeta Esmeralda, where they had to repeat to the deck officer a quote uttered by Arturo Prat at the Battle of Iquique – "¡Al abordaje, muchachos!" – "Charge the ship, men!" – in order to receive their next clue. Teams then had to travel to the Irlanda 3 Road Sign in the Atacama Desert, where they found their next clue.
- This season's first Detour was a choice between Brining or Mining. Both options required teams to bike to the salt mine in the Tarapacá salt flats. In Brining, teams had to carry bags of salt and dump them into a pool in order to reach neutral buoyancy. Once they were able to float on the surface, they could receive their next clue. In Mining, the teams had to use pickaxes and sledgehammers to open halite boulders until they found one that contained their next clue.
- After the Detour, teams were instructed to travel by bus to Santiago. Once there, they had to travel to the Plaza de Armas, where they found their next clue.
- In this leg's Roadblock, one team member had to work as a Chilean shoeshiner. After shining a customer's shoes, the racer had to properly put all of their supplies into their cart and transport it back to the storage depot in order to receive their next clue, which directed them to the Pit Stop: Cascada de las Animas in San José de Maipo.

Additional note

- Promotional photos showed some teams riding a zipline above the Maipo River at Cascada de las Animas before checking in at the Pit Stop. Once it was nighttime, teams could no longer ride the zipline and simply checked in at the Pit Stop, which was also moved from the suspension bridge.

=== Leg 3 (Chile → Portugal) ===
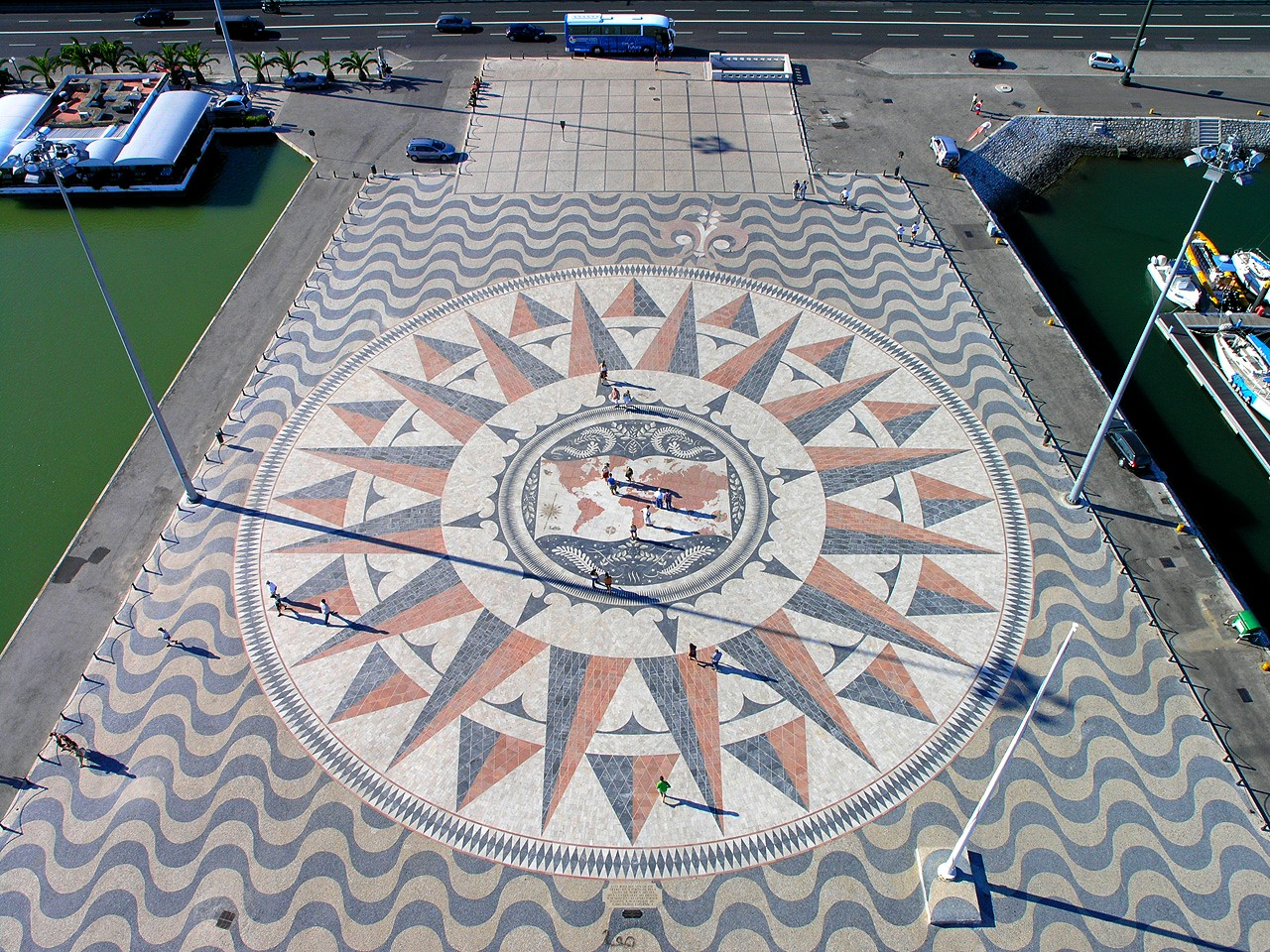
One of the Detour options in Lisbon required teams to measure the distance traveled by Ferdinand Magellan during his circumnavigation of the globe at the Padrão dos Descobrimentos.

- Episode 3: "King Arthur Style" (October 13, 2013)
- Prize: A trip for two to Costa Rica (awarded to Nicole & Travis)
- Eliminated: Chester & Ephraim

Locations

- San José de Maipo (Cascada de las Animas)
- Santiago → Lisbon, Portugal
- Lisbon (Martim Moniz Square → Miradouro das Portas do Sol)
- Lisbon (Museu Nacional dos Coches)
- Lisbon (Fábrica Sant'Anna or Jerónimos Monastery & Padrão dos Descobrimentos)
- Lisbon (Parque Florestal de Monsanto – Clube Português de Tiro a Chumbo)
- Sintra (Castelo dos Mouros)

Episode summary

- At the start of this leg, teams were instructed to fly to Lisbon, Portugal. Once there, teams had to travel to Martim Moniz Square, where they had to take a tram to the Miradouro das Portas do Sol. Once there, they had to find Fado performers, who gave them their next clue: a painting of the Embassy Coach sent by King John V to Pope Clement XI. Teams had to figure out that the painting was directing them to the Museu Nacional dos Coches and that their next clue was near the Embassy Coach.
- This leg's Detour was a choice between Tiles or Miles. In Tiles, teams had to correctly assemble a life-size tile puzzle in order to receive their next clue. In Miles, teams had to first retrieve a giant-sized compass from the Jerónimos Monastery and then use it to map out the distance traveled by Ferdinand Magellan on his circumnavigation of the globe on the large compass rose at the Padrão dos Descobrimentos. Once teams were within 500 nautical miles of the correct answer, they could receive their next clue.
- After the Detour, teams had to travel to the Parque Florestal de Monsanto, where they found their next clue.
- In this leg's Roadblock, one team member had to put on a suit of armor and then use a ballista to fire an arrow into a shield 150 feet (46 m) away. Once successful, a knight retrieved their shield which had their next clue on the back, which directed them to the Pit Stop: the Castelo dos Mouros in Sintra.

Additional note

- Chester & Ephraim did not arrive in Lisbon until long after all of the other teams had already checked in at the Pit Stop. Phil met them at the Lisbon Airport to inform them of their elimination.

=== Leg 4 (Portugal → Norway) ===
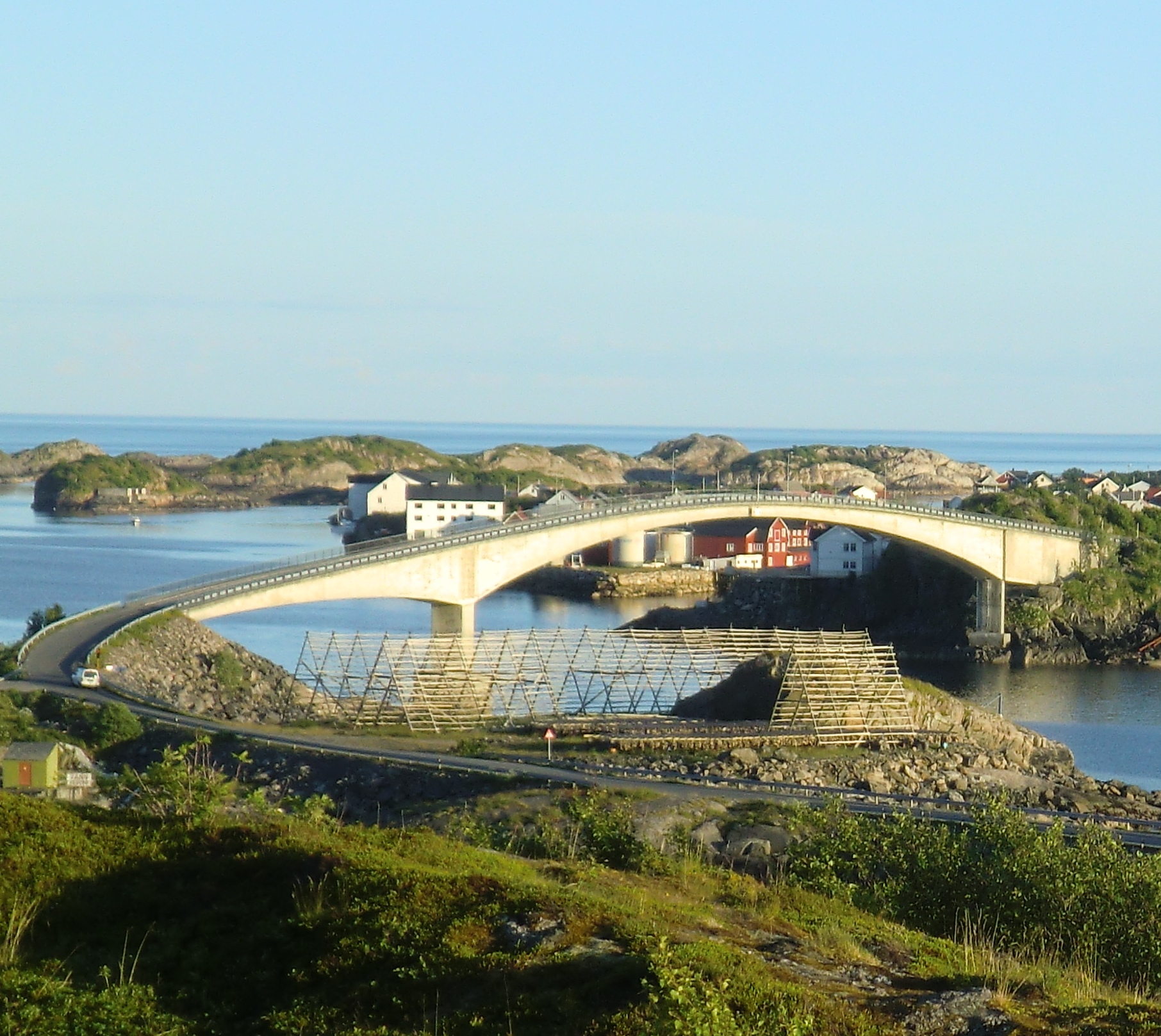
The Roadblock required racers to jump off of the Henningsvær Bridge into the icy waters below.

- Episode 4: "Beards in the Wind" (October 20, 2013)
- Prize: US$5,000 each (awarded to Brandon & Adam)

Locations

- Sintra (Castelo dos Mouros)
- Lisbon → Bodø, Norway
- Bodø → Svolvær (Ferry Terminal)
- Svolvær (L. Bergs Sønner A/S Fish Processor)
- Svolvær → Henningsvær
- Henningsvær (Henningsvær Bridge)
- Henningsvær (Rock Quarry)
- Vestvågøy (Viking Longhouse)

Episode summary

- At the start of this leg, teams were instructed to fly to Bodø, Norway. Once there, teams had to travel by ferry to Svolvær and search for their next clue.
- This leg's Detour was a choice between Hang Your Heads or Hammer of the Cods. In Hang Your Heads, teams had to string together six bundles of fish heads. They then had to transport them by wheelbarrow to a drying rack and place them on a rod in order to receive their next clue. In Hammer of the Cods, teams had to collect 15 pairs of cod from a 30-foot (9.1 m) high drying rack and transport them to a manufacturing area, where they had to smash the cod into one kilogram (2.2 lb) of fish jerky in order to receive their next clue.
- After the Detour, teams had to travel in a rigid-hulled inflatable boat to the Henningsvær fishing village, where they found their next clue.
- In this leg's Roadblock, one team member had to put on a wetsuit, jump off the Henningsvær Bridge, and swing on the end of an 80-foot (24 m) rope. They then had to fall into the water and swim to a buoy that held their next clue. Once they swam back to their partner, who was waiting in a boat, they could return to shore.
- After the Roadblock, teams had to properly hitch a granite boulder on a sled to a provided truck in a rock quarry. They then had to pull the sled far enough forward so as to reveal their next clue and a satchel of Viking coins underneath. Teams then had to check in at the Pit Stop: the Viking Longhouse in Vestvågøy.

Additional notes

- While searching for the Pit Stop, Tim & Marie gave their second Express Pass to Nicole & Travis. (Note: While this handoff took place during the fourth leg, it was shown at the start of the fifth episode.)
- There was no elimination at the end of this leg; all teams were instead instructed to continue racing.

=== Leg 5 (Norway → Poland) ===
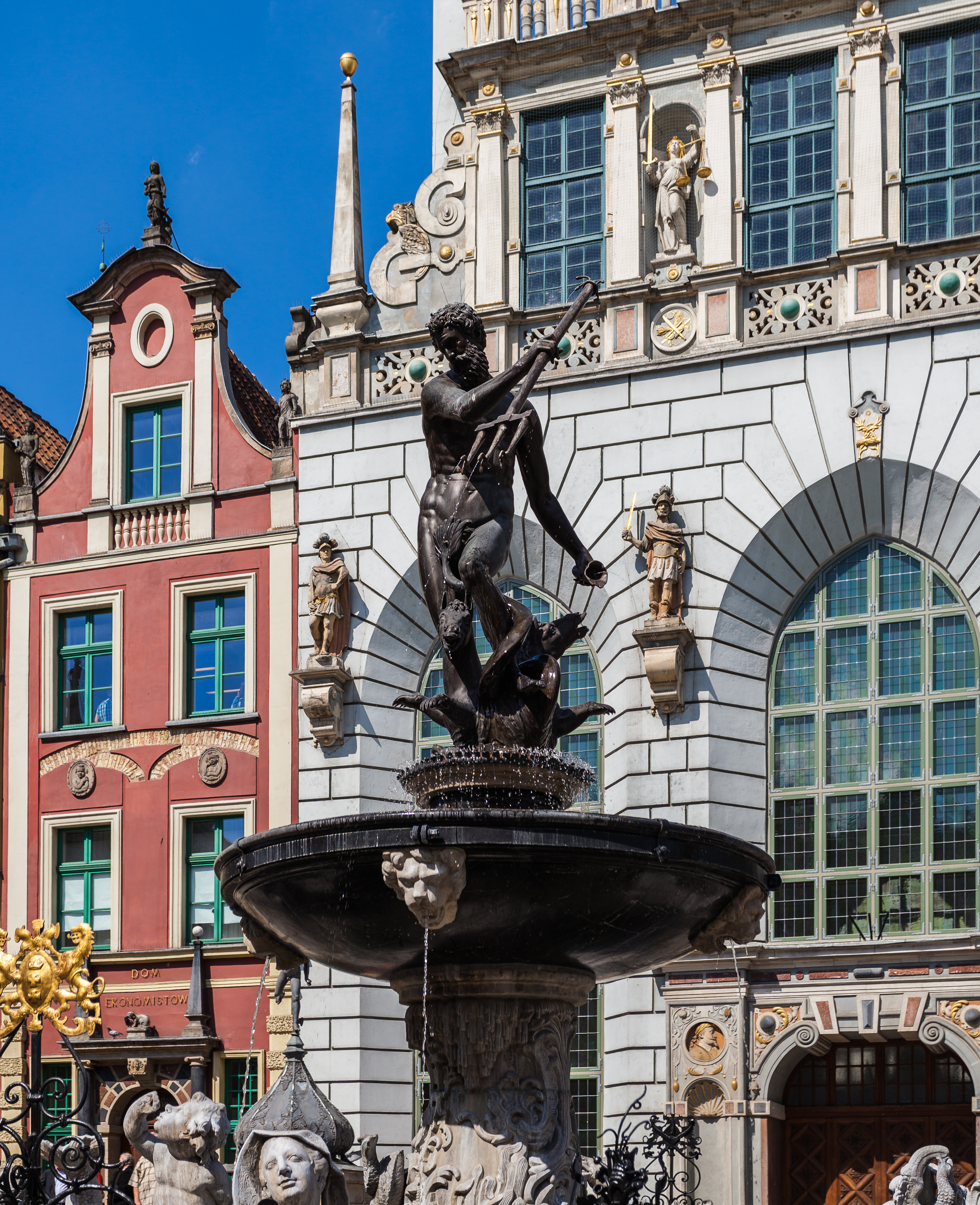
One of the Detour choices in Poland required teams to pose like the statute of Neptune on Neptune's Fountain in front of the Gdańsk Town Hall.

- Episode 5: "Get Our Groove On" (October 27, 2013)
- Prize: A trip for two to Hawaii (awarded to Tim & Marie)
- Eliminated: Brandon & Adam

Locations

- Svolvær → Trondheim
- Trondheim → Gdańsk, Poland
- Gdańsk (Gdańsk Shipyard – Solidarity Square)
- Gdańsk (Golden Gate)
- Gdańsk (Long Market – Neptune's Fountain or Old Town Hall)
- Gdańsk (Motława Riverfront – Medieval Harbor Crane)
- Gdańsk (Przymorze)
- Sopot (Sopot Pier)

Episode summary

- At the start of this leg, teams had to travel by overnight ferry to Trondheim and then fly to Gdańsk, Poland. Once there, teams had to travel to Solidarity Square at the Gdańsk Shipyard, where they found their next clue directing them to the Golden Gate.
- This leg's Detour was a choice between Pose or Polka. In Pose, teams had to dress up as Neptune, pose like his statute at the Neptune Fountain, and solicit donations until they collected 75 zł (roughly US$19) in order to receive their next clue. In Polka, teams had to don traditional Polish costumes and then perform a polka dance routine to the satisfaction of their dance instructor in order to receive their next clue. After completing either Detour task, teams had to wear their costumes for the remainder of the leg. Tim & Marie used their Express Pass to bypass this Detour.
- After the Detour, teams had to search the Motława Riverfront for the foreman at the Medieval Harbor Crane with their next clue, which directed them to Przymorze.
- In this leg's Roadblock, one team member had to search among twelve addresses in the 1/2-mile (800 m) long, 6,000 person falowiec in Przymorze and taste a traditional Polish pastry called a pączek in each apartment. Once they found the apartment serving rose hip pączki (identified by a red center), they received their next clue, which directed them to the Pit Stop: Sopot Pier.

Additional note

- This leg featured a Double U-Turn. Tim & Danny chose to use the U-Turn on Leo & Jamal, while Leo & Jamal chose to use the U-Turn on Brandon & Adam.

=== Leg 6 (Poland → Austria) ===
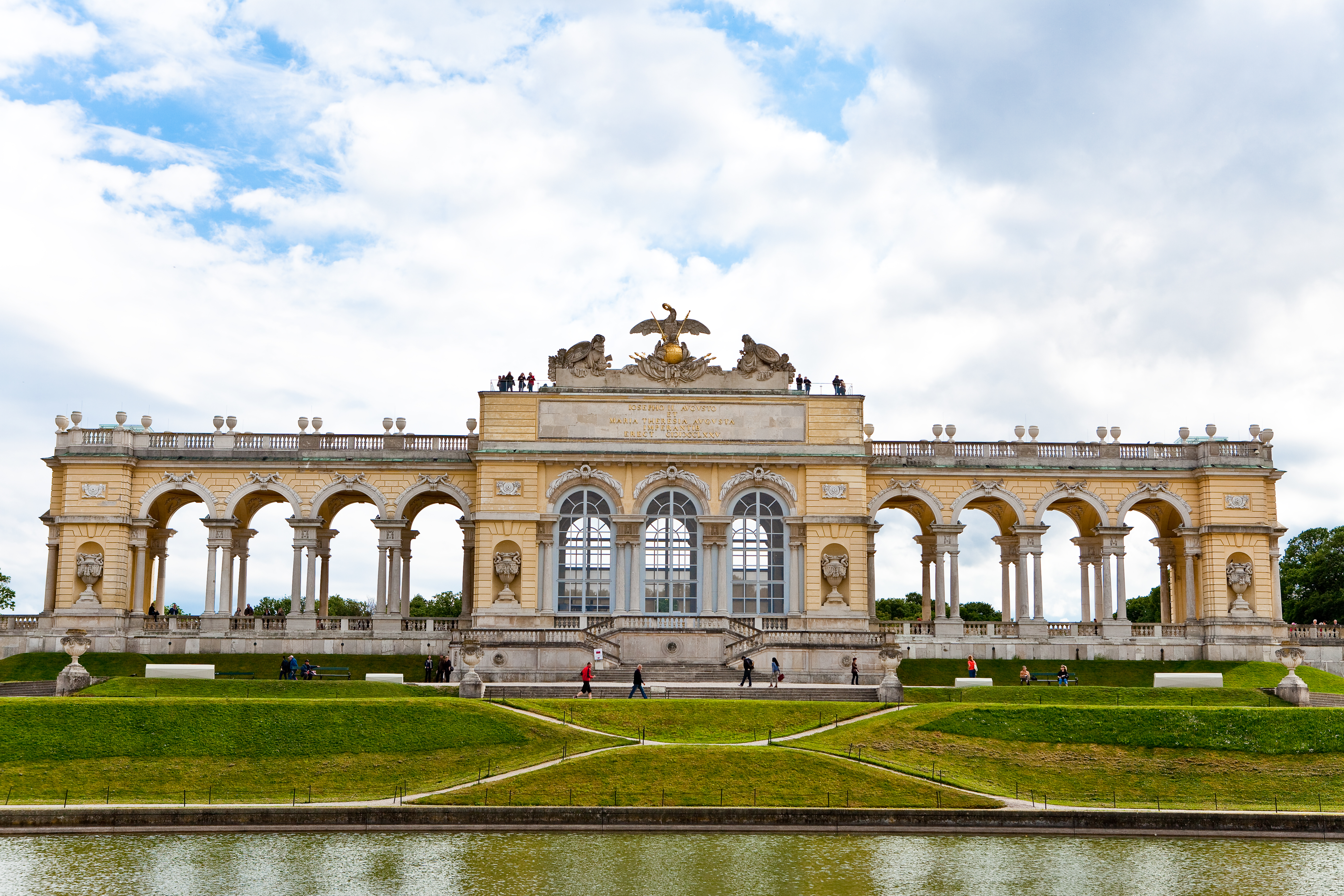
The gloriette of Vienna's Schönbrunn Palace was the Pit Stop for this leg.

- Episode 6: "Choir Boy at Heart" (November 3, 2013)
- Prize: A trip for two to Anguilla (awarded to Nicole & Travis)
- Eliminated: Tim & Danny

Locations

- Sopot (Sopot Pier)
- Gdańsk → Vienna, Austria
- Vienna (Vienna State Opera)
- Vienna (Donauturm)
- Vienna (Palais Lobkowitz – Austrian Theatre Museum)
- Vienna (Palais Augarten)
- Vienna (Schönbrunn Palace – Irrgarten)
- Vienna (Schönbrunn Palace – Gloriette)

Episode summary

- At the start of this leg, teams had to travel by overnight train to Vienna, Austria. Once there, teams traveled to the Vienna State Opera and met an actor dressed as Rigoletto, who escorted them to the opera's costume department and then gave them their next clue.
- This season's only Fast Forward was a Switchback from season 4, where both team members would have had to perform a 500-foot (150 m) bungee jump from the top of the Donauturm. However, the Fast Forward was unavailable due to high winds and no teams chose to wait for more favorable weather.
- This leg's Detour was a choice between Light Brigade or Masquerade. In Light Brigade, teams would have traveled to the Ephesos Museum, dressed as court servants, and assembled an elaborate crystal chandelier in order to receive their next clue. In Masquerade, teams had to put on elaborately colored masks and join a Viennese ball, where they had to search among the waltzing couples for the pair wearing identical masks to their own in order to receive their next clue. All teams chose Masquerade.
- After the Detour, teams had to travel to Palais Augarten in order to find their next clue.
- In this leg's Roadblock, one team member had to learn how to sing Franz Schubert's "Die Forelle" and then perform it with the Vienna Boys' Choir with correct German pronunciation and musicality in order to receive their next clue.
- After the Roadblock, teams had to travel to Schönbrunn Palace and search the palace's garden hedge maze for their next clue, which directed them to the Pit Stop: the gloriette on the palace grounds.

=== Leg 7 (Austria → United Arab Emirates) ===
After arriving in Abu Dhabi, teams visited the Sheikh Zayed Grand Mosque, one of the largest mosques in the world.

- Episode 7: "Speed Dating Is the Worst" (November 10, 2013)
- Prize: A trip for two to Paris, France (awarded to Leo & Jamal)

Locations

- Vienna (Stadtpark)
- Vienna → Abu Dhabi, United Arab Emirates
- Abu Dhabi (Sheikh Zayed Grand Mosque)
- Abu Dhabi (Irani Souk – Jaber Khoory Household Appliances Company)
- Abu Dhabi (Abu Dhabi Vegetable Market or Dhow Harbor)
- Abu Dhabi (Al Bandar Marina) → Yas Island (Yas Marina)
- Yas Island (Yas Viceroy Hotel Abu Dhabi & Yas Marina Circuit)
- Yas Island (Yas Marina Circuit – Champions' Podium)

Episode summary

- At the start of this leg, teams were instructed to fly to Abu Dhabi in the United Arab Emirates. Once there, teams had to enter the Sheikh Zayed Grand Mosque in order to receive their next clue. Teams were then directed to find their next clue at the Jaber Khoory Household Appliances Company.
- This leg's Detour was a choice between Sort It Out or Sew It Up. In Sort It Out, teams had to search through several types of dates and prepare an elaborate tray that matched an example in order to receive their next clue. In Sew It Up, teams had to put together a traditional fishing net to the satisfaction of the fishing boat captain in order to receive their next clue.
- After the Detour, teams had to travel to the Al Bandar Marina, where they had to board a marked yacht that departed every 15 minutes to Yas Island.
- In this leg's Roadblock, one team member dropped 200 feet (61 m) from the top of the Yas Viceroy Hotel Abu Dhabi before rappelling down to the ground. They then got into a Le Mans Prototype race car and rode along on a lap of the Yas Marina Circuit. While in the car, racers had to look among the signs on the track with drivers' names and times logged in the inaugural Abu Dhabi Grand Prix for the circuit record set by Sebastian Vettel. Once they told the pit crew chief the correct time and driver, he gave them their next clue. If they were incorrect, they had to make another lap around the track until they got the correct answer.
- After the Roadblock, teams had to check in at the Pit Stop: the champions' podium of the Yas Marina Circuit.

Additional note

- This was a non-elimination leg.

=== Leg 8 (United Arab Emirates) ===
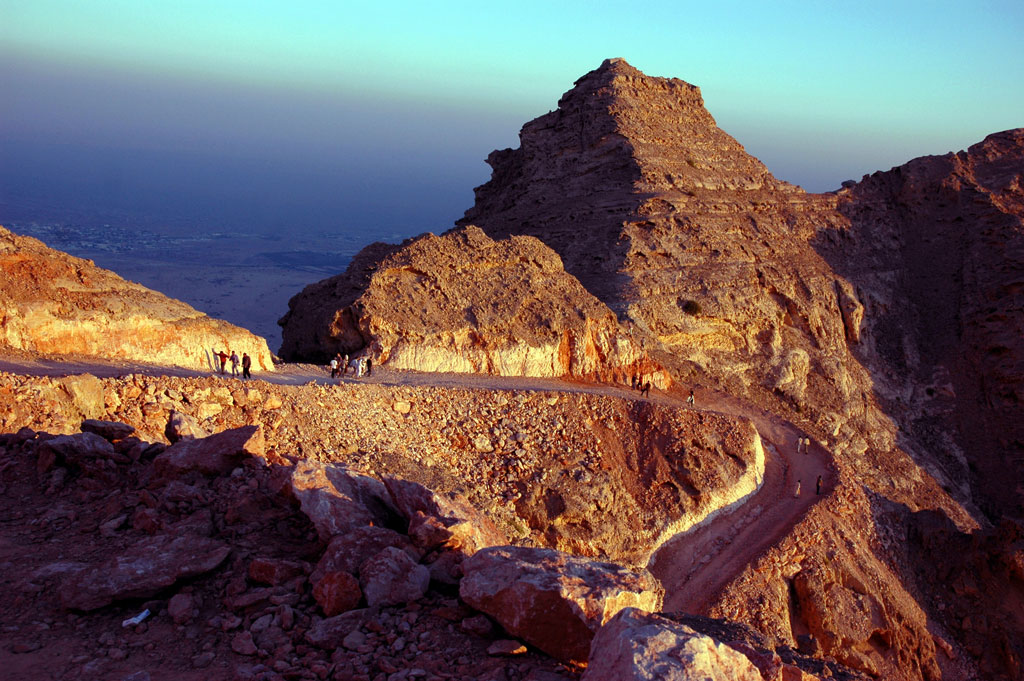
Jebel Hafeet was the location of the Pit Stop on this leg.

- Episode 8: "One Hot Camel" (November 17, 2013)
- Prize: A choice of any two Ford EcoBoost vehicles (awarded to Nicole & Travis)
- Eliminated: Nicky & Kim

Locations

- Yas Island (Yas Marina Circuit)
- Yas Island (Yas Marina Circuit – Pit Row Garage 14)
- Al Khatim Desert (Boudthib Endurance Village)
- Al Ain (Al Ain Oasis)
- Al Ain (Al Jahili Fort)
- Al Ain (Al Jahili Tower)
- Al Ain (Wadi Adventure)
- Al Ain (Jebel Hafeet – Mercure Grand Hotel)

Episode summary

- At the start of this leg, teams had to use the Viking coins they'd received in Norway to decipher a numeric code and unlock a vehicle, which they then drove the Boudthib Endurance Village in the Al Khatim Desert. There, teams had to use dune buggies to follow a marked course until they found the clue box containing their next clue. Teams then had to drive to the Al Ain Oasis and search for their next clue, which was located at the top of one of several date palm trees.
- This leg's Detour was a choice between Wedding Guests or Beauty Contest. In Wedding Guests, teams had to prepare machbūs, a traditional Emirati dish for wedding guests, and serve the finished dish to a wedding party in exchange for their next clue. In Beauty Contest, teams had to dress a camel for a camel show to the specifications of a judges panel before receiving their next clue. Nicole & Travis used their Express Pass to bypass this Detour.
- After the Detour, teams had to travel on foot to the Al Jahili Tower, where they found their next clue sending them to Wadi Adventure.
- For their Speed Bump, Nicky & Kim had to swim across a wave pool with a six-foot (1.8 m) high wave crashing down upon them every 90 seconds, and climb up the ladder on the other side of the pool, before they could continue racing.
- In this leg's Roadblock, one team member had to ride down the largest man-made river rapids in the world and collect red, green, and black flags in order to receive their next clue, which directed them to the Pit Stop: the Mercure Grand Hotel.

Additional note

- This leg featured a Double U-Turn. Nicole & Travis chose to use the U-Turn on Leo & Jamal, while Tim & Marie chose to use the U-Turn on Nicky & Kim.

=== Leg 9 (United Arab Emirates → Indonesia) ===
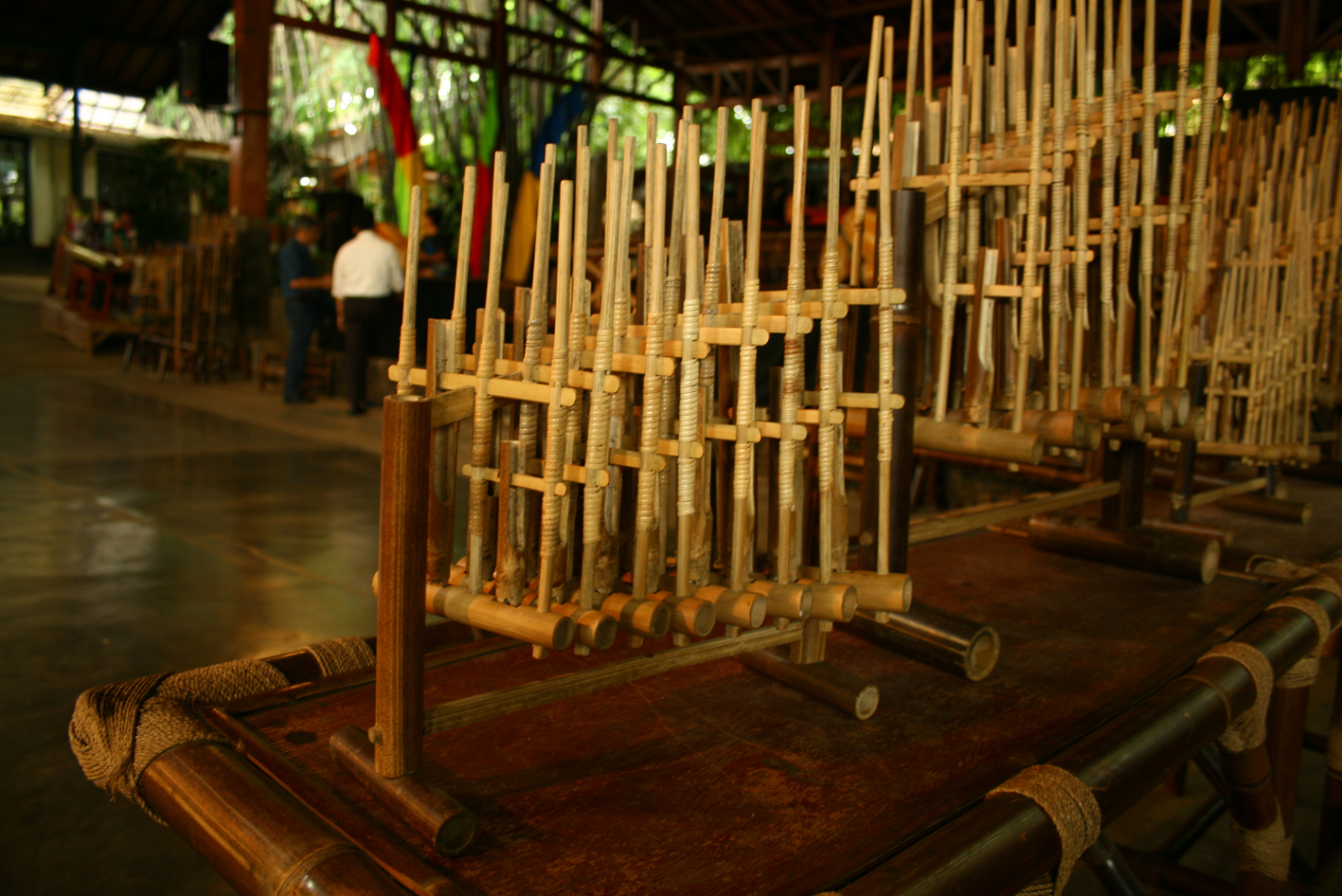
The Roadblock in Bandung had racers assemble an angklung, a traditional Indonesian musical instrument.

- Episode 9: "Part Like the Red Sea" (November 24, 2013)
- Prize: US$7,500 each (awarded to Leo & Jamal)
- Eliminated: Ally & Ashley

Locations

- Yas Island (Yas Viceroy Hotel Abu Dhabi)
- Abu Dhabi → Bandung, Indonesia
- Cileunyi (Cikandang Village Ram Arena)
- Rancaekek → Bandung (Bandung Railway Station)
- Bandung (Simpang Dago Market & Bandung Zoo or Sukahaji Bird Market & Sumber Sari Arena)
- Padasuka (Saung Angklung Udjo)
- Lembang (Bosscha Observatory)

Episode summary

- At the start of this leg, teams were instructed to fly to Bandung, Indonesia, on the island of Java. Once there, teams had to travel to Cileunyi, pick up two Priangan rams, and take them to the ram arena so they could participate in a traditional ram fight. Once the rams butted heads, teams had to load them back on their trucks in order to receive their next clue, which instructed them to travel by train back to Bandung and search inside the train station for their next clue.
- This leg's Detour was a choice between For the Elephants or For the Birds. In For the Elephants, teams visited the Simpang Dago Market, where they had to pick up watermelons, bananas, sweet potatoes, and sugar cane, and take everything to the Bandung Zoo. Once there, they had to feed the elephants in order to receive their next clue. In For The Birds, teams picked up two matching rosy-faced lovebirds at the Sukahaji Bird Market and took them to a bird song grand prix at the Sumber Sari Arena. Once their birds were scored, the judge awarded them their next clue.
- After the Detour, teams had to travel to Saung Angklung Udjo in order to find their next clue.
- In this leg's Roadblock, one team member had to properly assemble an angklung: a traditional Indonesian musical instrument made of bamboo. Once racers could play a complete octave, they received their next clue, which directed them to the Pit Stop: the Bosscha Observatory in Lembang.

=== Leg 10 (Indonesia) ===
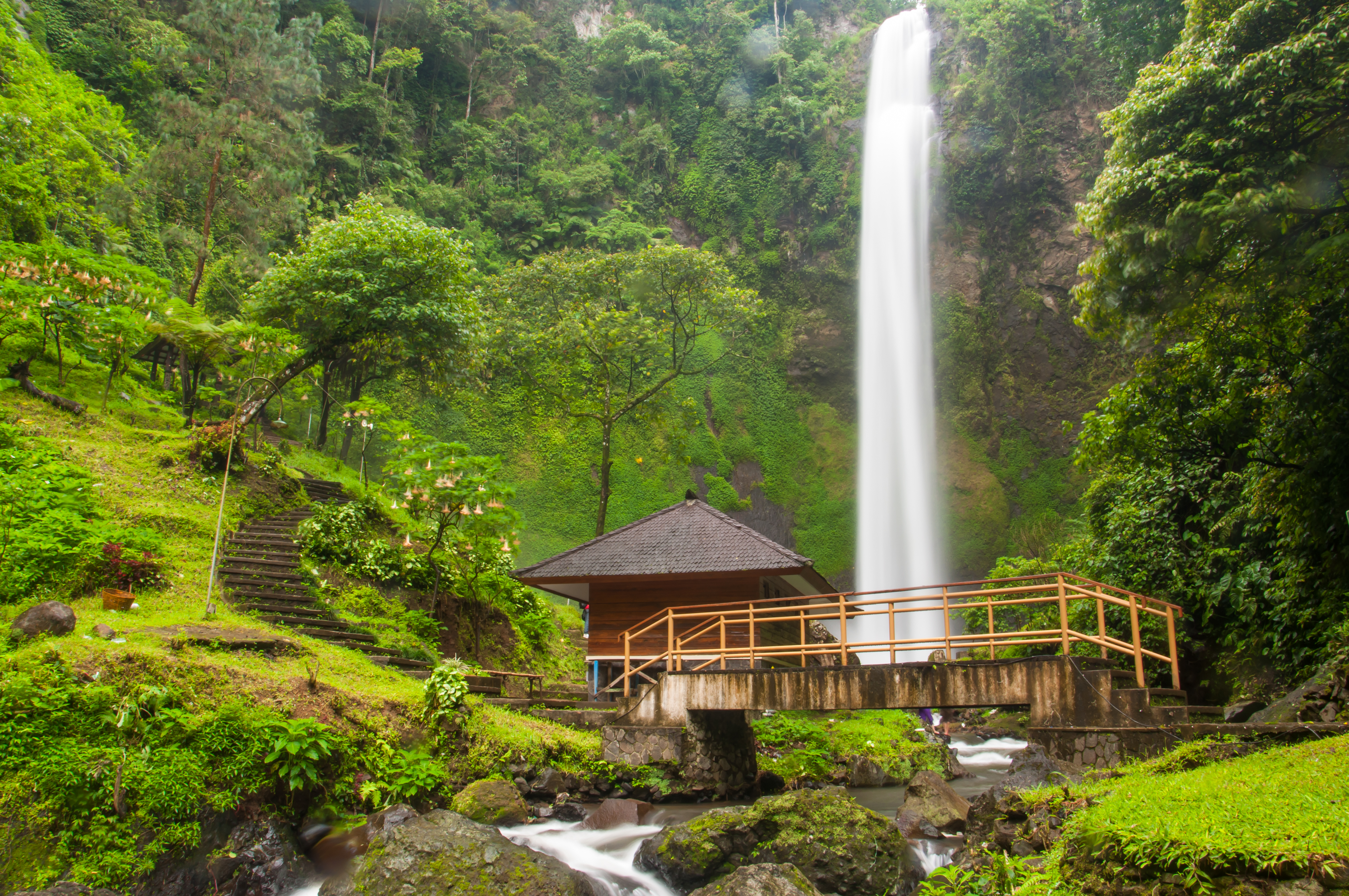
During the tenth leg, teams had to climb down 587 steps to reach the Pit Stop at Curug Cimahi.

- Episode 10: "Cobra in My Teeth" (December 1, 2013)
- Prize: A trip for two to Cancún, Mexico (awarded to Jason & Amy)

Locations

- Lembang (Bosscha Observatory)
- Parongpong (Ciwangun Indah Camp – King Cobra House)
- Subang (Tangkuban Perahu Volcano – Kawah Domas Crater)
- Subang (Gracia Spa Graha Ciater or Ciater Tea Plantation)
- Cisarua (Curug Cimahi)

Episode summary

- At the start of this leg, teams had to travel to the King Cobra House, where both team members had to eat a 20-centimeter (7.9 in) portion of grilled cobra in order to receive their next clue. Teams then had to travel to Tangkuban Perahu in order to find their next clue.
- In this leg's Roadblock, one team member picked up sixty eggs from a food stand and then took a moped taxi into the Kawah Domas crater of Tangkuban Perahu, where they used one of the volcanic hot springs to boil the eggs. After returning to the stand with the eggs, an egg-spert sliced open each egg to see if they were sufficiently boiled. Once they had a dozen hard-boiled eggs, teams received their next clue.
- This leg's Detour was a choice between Paint Your Partner or Turn Over a New Leaf. In Paint Your Partner, teams traveled to the Gracia Spa Graha Ciater, where they had to make each other up in traditional Javanese bridal makeup to the satisfaction of a beautician in order to receive their next clue. In Turn Over a New Leaf, teams traveled to a tea plantation in Ciater and dressed as traditional tea harvesters. They then had to search the plantation for a pair of clipping shears hidden in the plants, which they could trade for their next clue.
- After the Detour, teams had to travel to Cisarua and climb down 587 steps in order to reach the Pit Stop: Curug Cimahi.

Additional note

- This was a non-elimination leg.

=== Leg 11 (Indonesia → Japan) ===
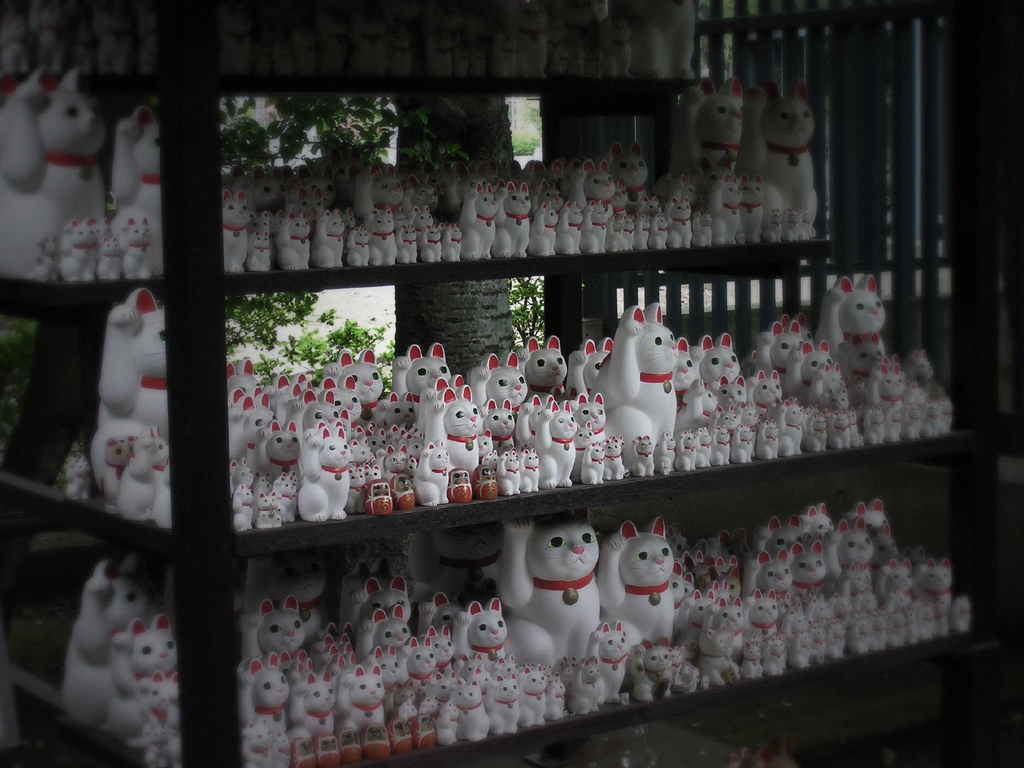
After arriving in Tokyo, teams traveled to the Gotokuji Temple, known for its extensive collection of maneki-neko statues.

- Episode 11: "Amazing Crazy Race" (December 8, 2013)
- Prize: A trip for two to Aruba (awarded to Tim & Marie)
- Eliminated: Leo & Jamal

Locations

- Bandung (Sheraton Bandung)
- Bandung → Tokyo, Japan
- Tokyo (Gotokuji Temple)
- Tokyo (Tokyo Media City or Kinuta Park)
- Tokyo (Shinjuku Central Park)
- Tokyo (Shibuya Scramble Crossing)
- Tokyo (Konnō Hachimangū Shrine)

Episode summary

- At the start of this leg, teams were instructed to fly to Tokyo, Japan. Once there, teams had to travel to the Gotokuji Temple in order to find their next clue.
- This season's final Detour was a choice between Knock It Down or Call It Up. In Knock It Down, teams had to pick up four large pins outside Tokyo Media City studios and then participate in a human bowling game show, with team members alternating slides down an incline on an inner tube into a set of pins. Once teams scored a strike, they received their next clue. In Call It Up, one racer had to put on a swimsuit, jump into an art installation using one of Tokyo's telephone booths filled with water and goldfish, dial a provided telephone number, and then listen to the provided message: "Welcome to Tokyo. Wasabi taberu." They then had to repeat the message to their partner, who had to correctly relay the message to a judge in order to receive their next clue.
- After the Detour, teams had to travel to Shinjuku Central Park in order to find their next clue.
- For their Speed Bump, Leo & Jamal had to join a group of zookeepers in a training drill and help capture an escaped "rhinoceros" before they could continue racing.
- In this leg's Roadblock, one team member had to assemble a "robot" using a set of cardboard pipes with only a miniature model as a guide in order to receive their next clue.
- After the Roadblock, teams had to search the Shibuya Scramble Crossing for a roaming "vending machine" that held their next clue, which directed them to the Pit Stop: the Konnō Hachimangū Shrine.

=== Leg 12 (Japan → United States) ===
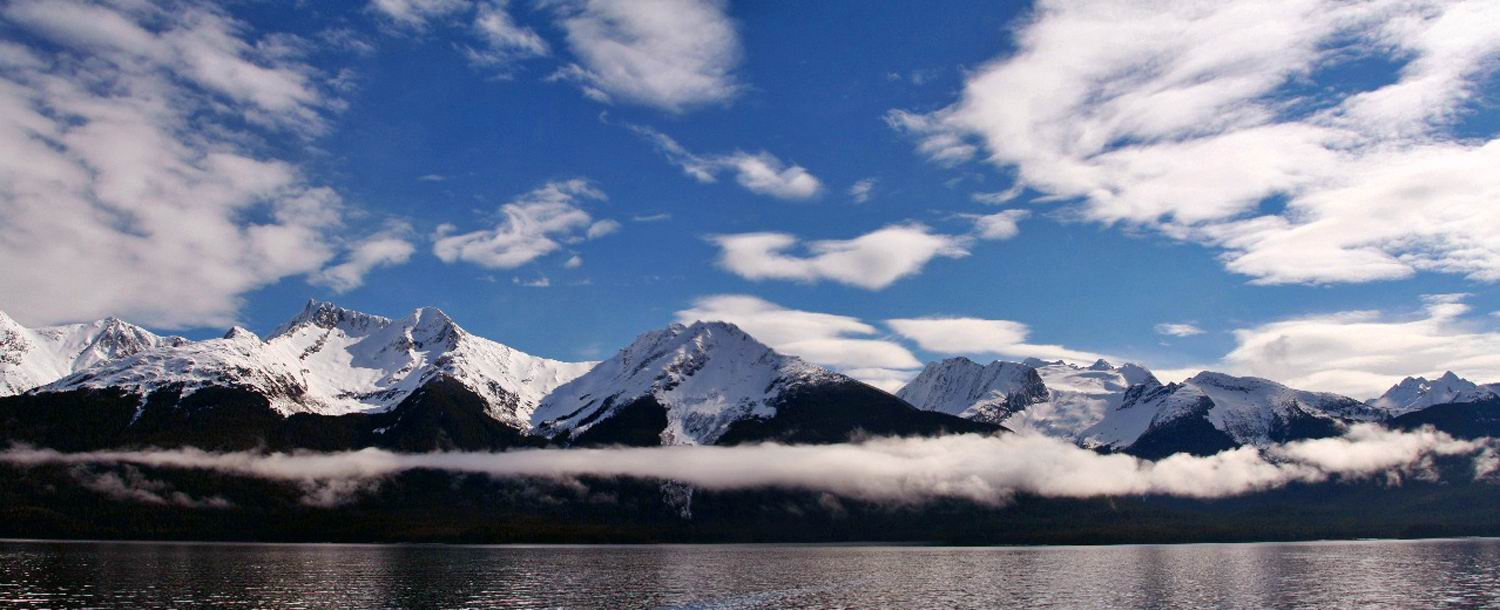
Teams flew to the Norris Glacier in the Taku Inlet during this last leg in Juneau.

- Episode 11: "Amazing Crazy Race" (December 8, 2013)
- Prize: US$1,000,000
- Winners: Jason & Amy
- Runners-up: Tim & Marie
- Third place: Nicole & Travis

Locations

- Tokyo (Shinjuku Central Park)
- Tokyo → Juneau, Alaska
- Juneau (Douglas Harbor → Grizzly Bar)
- Juneau (Grizzly Bar) → Taku Inlet (Norris Glacier)
- Taku Inlet (Norris Glacier → "Marked Island")
- Taku Inlet ("Marked Island") → Juneau (Juneau Cruise Ship Terminal)
- Juneau (Blueberry Hills Trailhead)
- Juneau (End of North Douglas Highway – Outer Point Trail)

Episode summary

- At the start of this leg, teams were instructed to fly to Juneau, Alaska. Once there, teams had to travel by boat from Douglas Harbor to Grizzly Bar, where they found their next clue.
- In this season's final Roadblock, one team member had to ride in a bush plane and drop a bag of flour onto a target on the ground in order to receive their next clue.
- After the Roadblock, teams took a helicopter to Norris Glacier, where they chose a mountain guide to help them reach the face of the glacier, crossing a crevasse and going through an ice tunnel along the way. They then had to use a pickaxe to dig out their next clue, which was frozen inside a glacier among numerous false clues. Teams then paddled kayaks to an island where they found their next clue, which instructed them to return to Juneau and travel to the Blueberry Hills Trailhead.
- For their final task, teams then had to assemble a wall of totem poles that spelled out the names of the currencies used in the countries that they visited in chronological order in order to receive their final clue, which directed them to the finish line: the Outer Point Trail at the end of the North Douglas Highway.

Country	Currency
Chile	Peso
Portugal	Euro
Norway	Krone
Poland	Złoty
Austria	Euro
United Arab Emirates	Dirham
Indonesia	Rupiah
Japan	Yen
United States	Dollar

Additional note

- Legs 11 and 12 aired back-to-back as a special two-hour episode.

== Reception ==
=== Critical response ===
The Amazing Race 23 received mixed reviews. Daniel Fienberg of HitFix wrote that it "was an average-to-slightly-below-average 'Amazing Race' season. There were some memorable moments and a few likable people, even if they were eliminated way too earlier. There’s a version of this season in which Chester & Ephraim and Brandon & Adam make it way, way further and the season ends up much more enjoyable. But there were some good locations and I personally got a kick out of all of the travel wackiness in the first handful of episodes." Michael Hewitt of the Orange County Register called it "one of its least-ambitious seasons". In 2016, this season was ranked 15th out of the first 27 seasons by the Rob Has a Podcast Amazing Race correspondents. Kareem Gantt of Screen Rant wrote that "Season 23 had a great cast and went to some truly stunning places in countries such as Chile and Indonesia. Season 23 proved that you can't judge a season just by its cover." In 2023, Rhenn Taguiam of Game Rant ranked this season as the twelfth-best season. In 2024, Taguiam's ranking was updated with this season ranked 15th out of 36.

=== Ratings ===
U.S. Nielsen ratings

#	Airdate	Episode	Rating	Share	Rating/Share	Viewers	Rank	Rank	Rank	Rank
#	Airdate	Episode	Households		18–49	(millions)	Timeslot (Viewers)	Timeslot (18–49)	Week (Viewers)	Week (18–49)
1	September 29, 2013	"We're Not in Oklahoma No More"	5.4	8	2.0/5	8.62	2	4	<25	<25
2	October 6, 2013	"Zip It, Bingo"	5.9	9	2.4/6	9.74	2	2	23	<25
3	October 13, 2013	"King Arthur Style"	5.0	8	1.9/5	8.08	3	4	<25	<25
4	October 20, 2013	"Beards in the Wind"	5.5	8	1.9/5	8.87	2	2	25	<25
5	October 27, 2013	"Get Our Groove On"	5.0	7	1.8/4	8.11	3	4	<25	<25
6	November 3, 2013	"Choir Boy at Heart"	5.8	9	2.1/5	9.38	2	3	22	<25
7	November 10, 2013	"Speed Dating Is the Worst"	5.5	8	2.2/5	9.12	2	2	24	24
8	November 17, 2013	"One Hot Camel"	5.4	8	2.0/5	9.12	3	3	24	<25
9	November 24, 2013	"Part Like the Red Sea"	4.9	7	1.6/4	7.97	3	4	<25	<25
10	December 1, 2013	"Cobra in My Teeth"	6.1	9	2.1/4	10.29	2	2	17	23
11	December 8, 2013	"Amazing Crazy Race"	5.4	8	2.1/5	9.21	2	3	18	25

- Episode 1, "We're Not in Oklahoma No More", aired at 8:12 p.m. Eastern / 7:12 p.m. Central in some markets due to the NFL on CBS.
- Episode 2, "Zip It, Bingo", aired at 8:44 p.m. Eastern / 7:44 p.m. Central due to the NFL on CBS.
- Episode 4, "Beards in the Wind", aired at 8:42 p.m. Eastern / 7:42 p.m. Central in some markets due to the NFL on CBS.
- Episode 5, "Get Our Groove On", aired at 8:08 or 8:36 p.m. Eastern / 7:08 or 7:36 p.m. Central in some markets due to the NFL on CBS.
- Episode 6, "Choir Boy at Heart", aired at 8:59 p.m. Eastern / 7:59 p.m. Central due to the NFL on CBS.
- Episode 7, "Speed Dating Is the Worst", aired at 8:46 p.m. Eastern / 7:46 p.m. Central due to the NFL on CBS.
- Episode 8, "One Hot Camel", aired at 8:08 p.m. Eastern / 7:08 p.m. Central in some markets due to the NFL on CBS.
- Episode 9, "Part Like the Red Sea" went up against the 2013 American Music Awards; the episode aired at 8:10 p.m. Eastern / 7:10 p.m. Central in some markets due to the NFL on CBS.
- Episode 10, "Cobra in My Teeth", aired at 8:51 p.m. Eastern / 7:51 p.m. Central due to the NFL on CBS.
- Episode 11, "Amazing Crazy Race", aired at 8:27 p.m. Eastern / 7:27 p.m. Central in some markets due to the NFL on CBS.

Canadian ratings

Canadian broadcaster CTV also airs The Amazing Race on Sundays. Episodes air at 8:00 p.m. Eastern, Central and Pacific (9:00 p.m. Mountain and Atlantic) with one exception: Episode nine aired two hours earlier than its normal start time due to CTV's broadcast of the 2013 American Music Awards.

#	Airdate	Episode	Viewers (millions)	Rank (Week)
1	September 29, 2013	"We're Not in Oklahoma No More"	2.38	6
2	October 6, 2013	"Zip It, Bingo"	2.04	6
3	October 13, 2013	"King Arthur Style"	1.73	10
4	October 20, 2013	"Beards in the Wind"	1.99	6
5	October 27, 2013	"Get Our Groove On"	2.30	2
6	November 3, 2013	"Choir Boy at Heart"	2.17	3
7	November 10, 2013	"Speed Dating Is the Worst"	1.95	6
8	November 17, 2013	"One Hot Camel"	2.41	2
9	November 24, 2013	"Part Like the Red Sea"	1.66	22
10	December 1, 2013	"Cobra in My Teeth"	2.51	4
11	December 8, 2013	"Amazing Crazy Race"	2.64	2

- Episode 3, "King Arthur Style", aired on the Sunday before Canadian Thanksgiving Day.
- Episode 9, "Part Like the Red Sea", aired on the day of the 101st Grey Cup.
