= Abu Dhabi Department of Education and Knowledge =

Educational regulatory authority in Abu Dhabi

Coordinates: 24.430061°N 54.464491°E

- دائرة التعليم والمعرفة

Department overview
- Formed: 15 September 2005
- Jurisdiction: Emirate of Abu Dhabi
- Department executives: Sara Awadh Musallam, Chairman; Mubarak Hamad Al Mheiri, Undersecretary
- Website: www.adek.gov.ae

The Abu Dhabi Department of Education and Knowledge (ADEK) (Arabic: دائرة التعليم والمعرفة), is the educational authority for the Emirate of Abu Dhabi, the largest emirate of the United Arab Emirates and the home of the country's capital city.

The department was initially established as an advisory council on education in 2005 by UAE president and ruler of Abu Dhabi, Sheikh Khalifa bin Zayed Al Nahyan, with the aim of improving teaching standards in the emirate by increasing the quality of teaching, curriculum, and administration. The department is currently responsible for the management and administration of the emirate's public charter schools. Additionally, it issues licenses, monitors, and inspects the emirate's many different private schools and public universities.

== Organization ==
It governs charter schools, private schools, and higher education in the emirate of Abu Dhabi. These three tiers are divided into three educational zones. Abu Dhabi Zone includes the capital city and the surrounding coastal areas, ending its authority near Al Khatim, halfway between Al Ain and Abu Dhabi, and the Abu Dhabi-Dubai border. The Al Ain Zone includes city of Al Ain and all schools north of Al Ain until the Abu Dhabi-Dubai border, all schools south of Al Ain to Saudi Arabia, and all schools west of Al Ain until Al Khatim on the Al Ain-Abu Dhabi road. Finally, the Western Zone, known as al Gharbia, is the largest by territory but smallest by population. It includes all schools in Abu Dhabi's western region, including some schools on outlying islands.

Since 2018, ADEK funds a separate, American-curriculum based charter school network that currently runs from kindergarten to grade 12; most charter schools are co-educational. As of 2023 the emirate has 31 charter schools, 265 public schools.

Private schools must abide by the department's governing rules and guidelines and are inspected once a year. However, they may operate using any approved curriculum including the American, British, IB and SABIS curriculums. There are 185 private schools in the emirate.

Higher education institutions in the emirate licensed and inspected by the department, but the ADEK is not involved in the management of any higher education institution. There are 18 higher education institutions.

== Criticism and controversy ==
In 2010, the newspaper The National wrote about poor student behavior as a factor into why some newly arrived teachers left the country without completing their contracts.

In September 2012, apartments provided by the department suffered a courtyard collapse, rendering the site unsafe for several months. Staff were evacuated to new accommodations.

Local newspapers frequently report instances of cheating in schools and universities under the department's supervision, including the use of ChatGPT.
