= Miss Rhode Island Teen USA =

Beauty pageant competition

- Formation: 1983
- Type: Beauty pageant
- Headquarters: Cranston
- Location: Rhode Island
- Members: Miss Teen USA
- Official language: English
- Key people: Deborah Miller; Cindy Provost

The Miss Rhode Island Teen USA competition is the pageant that selects the representative for the state of Rhode Island in the Miss Teen USA pageant and the name of the title held by that winner.

Rhode Island has placed eight times at the Miss Teen USA Pageant, most recently in 2024 when Carissa Tillinghast made the top 20. The state's first finalist was Shaelyn McNally in 2006. One of those semi-finalists was Shanna Moakler, who would later win the Miss New York USA pageant and take over the Miss USA 1995 title when Chelsi Smith won Miss Universe 1995.

Other notable Miss Rhode Island Teen USAs are:

- Claudia Jordan - was also Miss Rhode Island USA 1997 and has appeared on The Price Is Right, Deal or No Deal and The Real Housewives of Atlanta
- Gina Tognoni - known for her portrayal of Kelly Cramer on the soap opera One Life to Live from 1995 to 2001. She then portrayed the role of Phyllis Summers on the soap The Young and the Restless from 2014 to 2019.

Sienna Tandon of Johnston was crowned Miss Rhode Island Teen USA 2026 on July 19, 2026, at Uptown Theater in Providence. She will represent Rhode Island at Miss Teen USA 2026.

== Gallery of titleholders ==
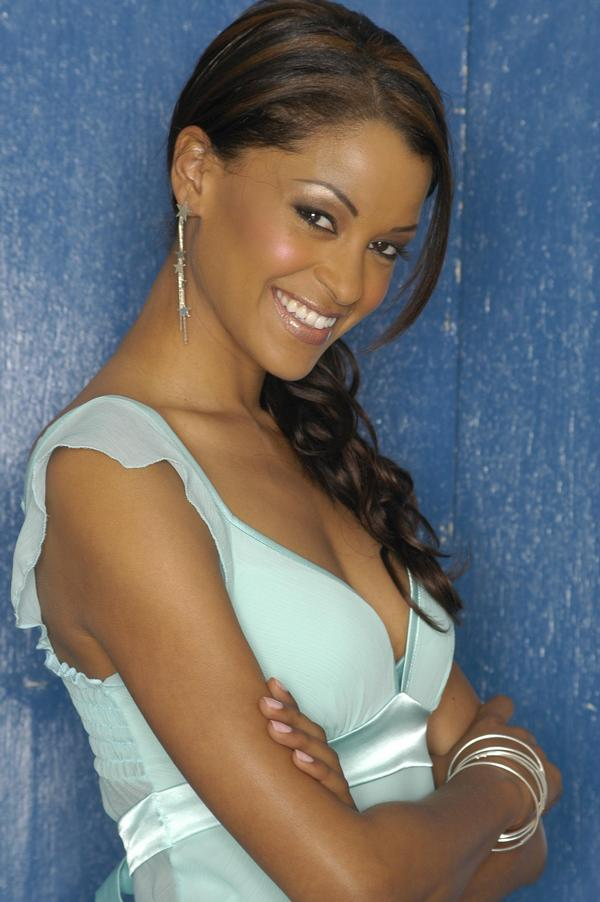
Claudia Jordan, Miss Rhode Island Teen USA 1990 & Miss Rhode Island USA 1997 (pictured in 2009)

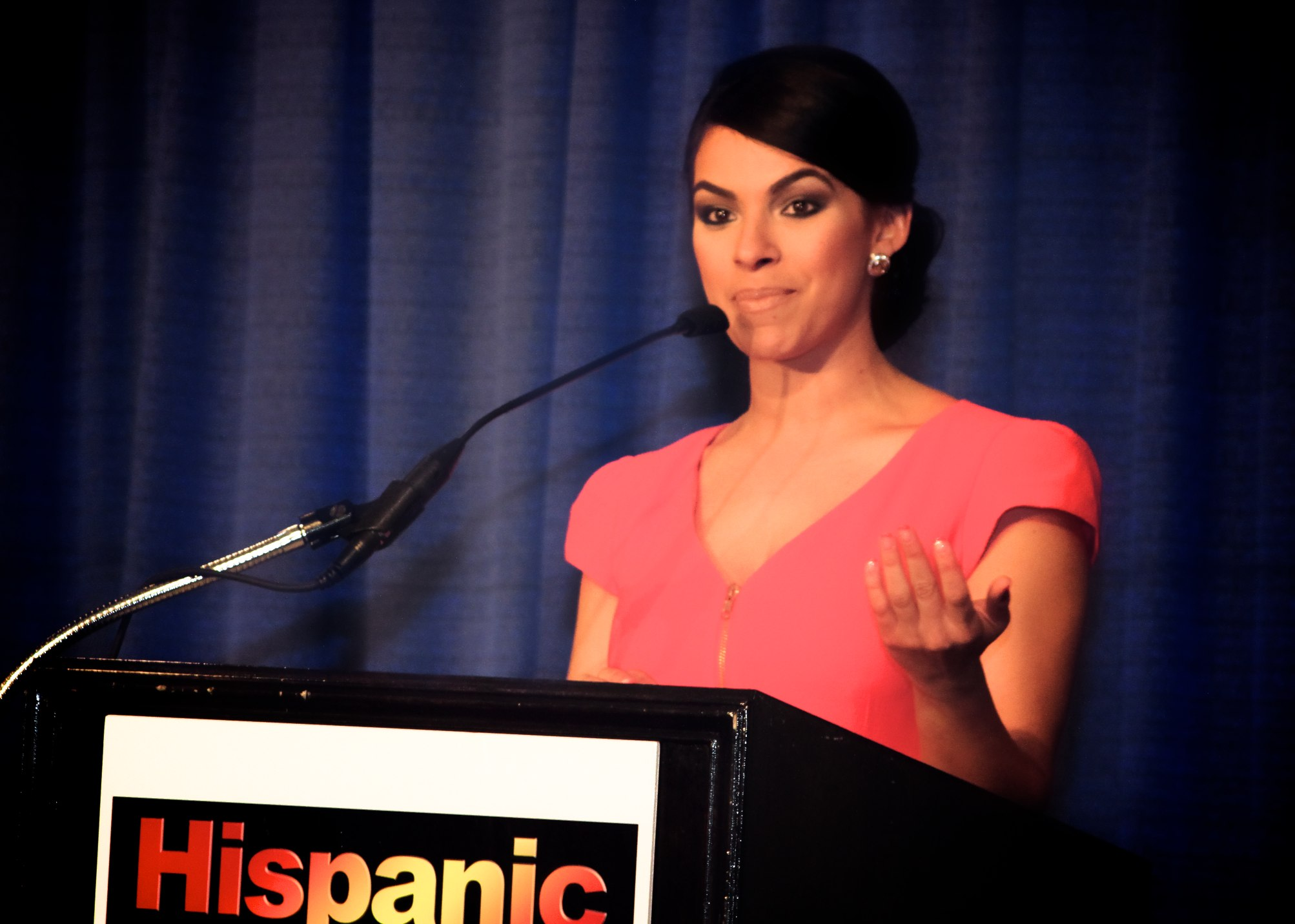
Amy Diaz, Miss Rhode Island Teen USA 2001 & Miss Rhode Island USA 2008.

== Results summary ==
=== Placements ===
- Top 10: Alysha Castonguay (2002), Shaelyn McNally (2006), Rochelle Rose (2007)
- Top 12: Gina Tognoni (1991), Shanna Moakler (1992)
- Top 15: Talia Turco (2009)
- Top 20: Lola Paolissi (2023), Carissa Tillinghast (2024)
- Rhode Island holds a record of 8 placements at the Miss Teen USA.

=== Awards ===
- Miss Photogenic: Raye-Anne Johnson (1987 - tie), Gina Tognoni (1991)
- Miss Congeniality: Malia Cruz (2016), Alexa Papigiotis (2017)

== Winners ==
- Declared as Winner
- Ended as runner-up
- Ended as one of the finalists or semifinalists

Year	Name	Hometown	Age^{1}	Local title	Placement at Miss Teen USA	Special awards at Miss Teen USA	Notes
2026	Sienna Tandon	Johnston	17	Miss Hope Teen			
2025	Reyana Ahern	Warwick	16	Miss Norwood Teen			
2024	Carissa Tillinghast	Warwick	19	Miss Warwick Teen	Top 20		
2023	Lola Paolissi	Cranston	16		Top 20		Later Miss Rhode Island Teen Volunteer 2026; 4th runner-up at Miss Teen Volunteer America 2027
2022	Julia Potts	Richmond	18				
2021	Sydney Jaiswal	Cranston	17				
2020	Sofia Ledoux	Cranston	16				
2019	Olivia Volpe	Cranston	18				
2018	Aliyah Moore	Pawtucket	17				
2017	Alexa Papigiotis	North Providence	18			Miss Congeniality	
2016	Malia Cruz	Warwick	18			Miss Congeniality	
2015	Mary Malloy	Cumberland	17				Later Miss Rhode Island USA 2023
2014	Gabriella Maggiacomo	Hope	17				
2013	Elaine Collado	Providence	18				Later Miss Rhode Island USA 2022
2012	Livia Stencel	Warwick	16				
2011	Lindsey Bucci	Scituate	18				
2010	Erica Wright	Narragansett	18				
2009	Talia Turco	Lincoln	18		Top 15		
2008	Tiondra Martinez	Woonsocket	17				
2007	Rochelle Rose	Cranston	15		Top 10		
2006	Shaelyn McNally	Lincoln	18		Top 10		
2005	Dominique Lee	Westerly	17				
2004	Melissa Landry	Charlestown	16				
2003	Kristina Primavera	Cranston	16				Later Miss Rhode Island USA 2010
2002	Alysha Castonguay	Woonsocket	16		Top 10		Later Miss Rhode Island USA 2009 (also Miss Teen America 2003 & Miss Teen Galaxy 2005); New England Patriots Cheerleader (2006–2008)
2001	Amy Diaz	Providence	16				Later Miss Rhode Island USA 2008, Top 15 at Miss USA 2008.; Winner of The Amazing Race 23 with her husband Jason.
2000	Sienna Piccione	Cranston	17				
1999	Jodi Fournier	Burrillville	18				
1998	Kristen Luneberg	Lincoln	17				Later Miss North Carolina USA 2003
1997	Lauren Alviti	Cranston	18				
1996	Kelly Dutra	Tiverton	17				
1995	Carol Pedroso	Warwick	18				
1994	Nicole Coletti	Cranston	17				
1993	Alisha Currier	North Kingstown	19				
1992	Shanna Moakler	Barrington	16		Top 12		Later Miss New York USA 1995; Miss USA 1995, Miss Teen All American 1992; actress & reality television star; Current director of the Miss Nevada USA and Miss Nevada Teen USA pageants. Previous co-director of the Miss California USA & Miss California Teen USA pageants
1991	Gina Tognoni	Bristol	17		Top 12	Miss Photogenic	
1990	Claudia Jordan	East Providence	16				Later Miss Rhode Island USA 1997, Top 10 at Miss USA 1997; Suitcase model on Deal or No Deal, cast member on season 7 of The Real Housewives of Atlanta
1989	Deborah "Deb" Hodges	East Greenwich	17				
1988	Debbie Rae Peters	North Providence	18				
1987	Raye-Anne Johnson	Wakefield	16			Miss Photogenic - tie	Later Miss Rhode Island USA 1994
1986	Corrine "Lori" Damiani	Cranston	18				
1985	Chris Pavalli	Warwick	18				
1984	Jennifer Amoroso	Narragansett	17				Later known by stage name Gianna Amore
1983	Melissa Sciarra	Warwick	16				

^{1} Age at the time of the Miss Teen USA pageant
