= Amy Diaz =

American actress, model & beauty pageant titleholder (born 1984)

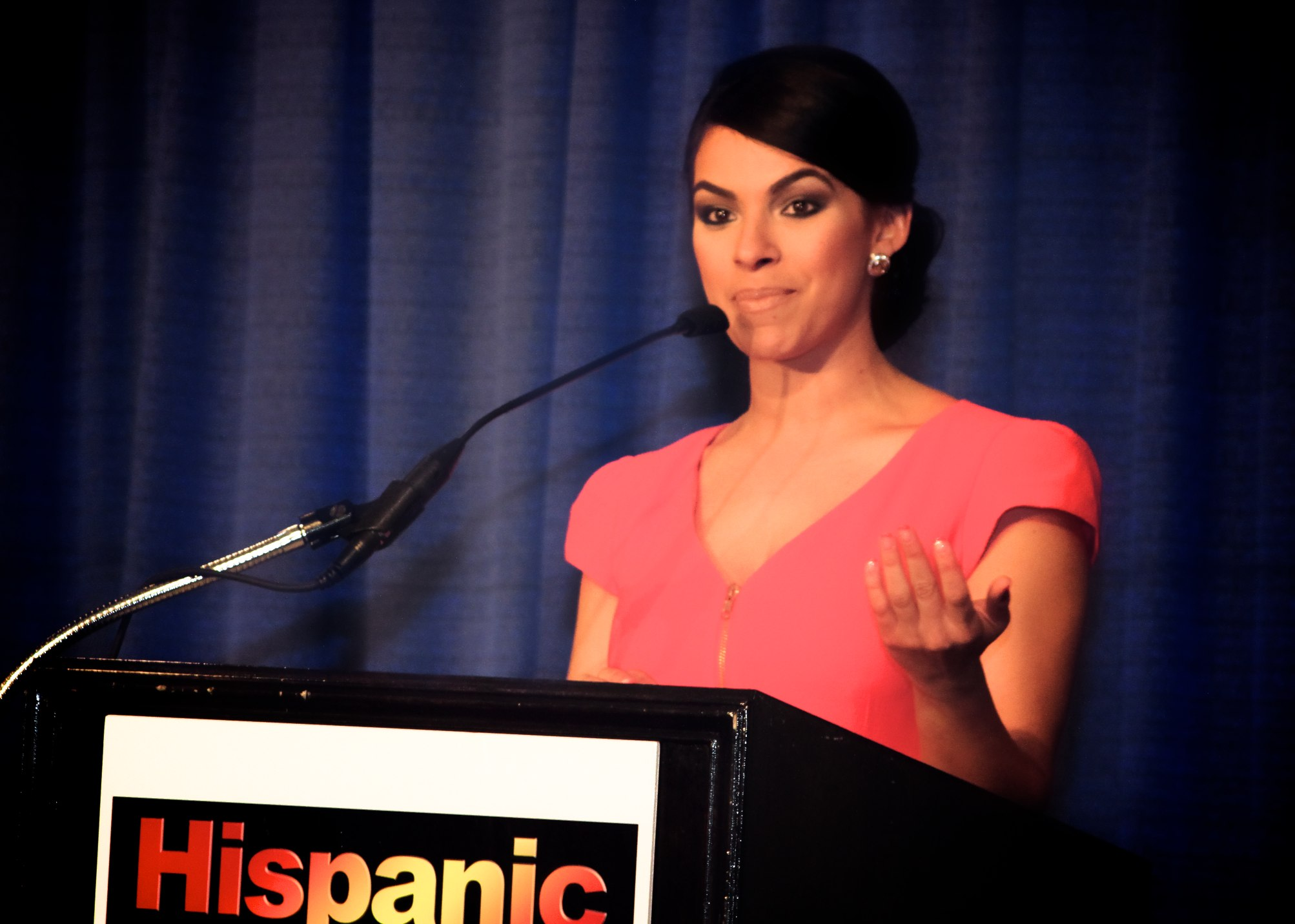
- Diaz in April 2014
- Born: August 6, 1984 (age 42); New York City, U.S.
- Beauty pageant titleholder
- Title: Miss Rhode Island Teen USA 2001; Miss Rhode Island USA 2008; Miss Earth United States 2009
- Major competitions: Miss Rhode Island Teen USA 2001 (Winner); Miss Teen USA 2001; Miss Florida USA 2007 (3rd Runner-Up); Miss Rhode Island USA 2008 (Winner); Miss USA 2008 (Top 15); Miss Earth United States 2009 (Winner); Miss Earth 2009 (Unplaced)

Amy Diaz (born August 6, 1984) is an American actress, model and beauty pageant titleholder who competed in the Miss USA 2008 and Miss Earth USA 2009. She is from Providence, Rhode Island. Diaz, along with her husband Jason Case, won the twenty-third installment of the American reality television show The Amazing Race.

== Background ==
Diaz attended Classical High School in Providence, Rhode Island. She is of Dominican descent.

Diaz graduated cum laude with a Bachelor of Arts in Broadcast Communication with a minor in Psychology from Barry University. In May 2007, she completed dual master's degrees in Business Administration and Sport Management there. Diaz is a nationally recognized President and Founding Sister of the Iota Theta chapter of Phi Sigma Sigma sorority and was the recipient of several leadership awards including: Graduate Assistant of the Year, Greek Organization President of the Year, Residential Life Hall Staff of the Year, and National Broadcasting Society Outstanding Member of the Year.

Diaz was a co-host of "Social Women", a Rhode Island's talk-show and entertainment program.

In 2013, Diaz was nominated for The Leukemia & Lymphoma Society Man & Woman of the Year Award, and she raised close to $10,000 in a 10-week period to help cure leukemia, lymphoma, Hodgkin's disease and myeloma, and improve the quality of life of patients and their families. Diaz has worked in media and production since 1999, and has been a Screen Actors Guild (SAG) member since 2000. She was also employed as the first personal assistant to tennis champion, Venus Williams.

== Television career ==
Diaz competed on the 23rd season of The Amazing Race with her then-boyfriend, Jason Case. After having six second-place finishes overall, they won the $1 million grand prize and the Amazing Race 23 title over exes Tim & Marie and married ER doctors Nicole & Travis.

== Beauty pageant ==
=== Miss Rhode Island Teen USA ===
Diaz won her first notable pageant title in 2001 when she was crowned Miss Rhode Island Teen USA 2001. She represented Rhode Island in the Miss Teen USA 2001 pageant held in South Padre Island, Texas in August 2001.

=== Miss Rhode Island USA ===
In September 2007, Diaz won the Miss Rhode Island USA 2008 title in a state pageant held in Providence. This was her first attempt at the Rhode Island title, although she placed third runner-up at Miss Florida USA 2007. Diaz is the first Miss Teen USA delegate to win a Miss USA 2008 state title.

=== Miss USA ===
Diaz competed in the Miss USA 2008 pageant held in Las Vegas, Nevada and placed in the top 15.

=== Miss Earth 2009 ===
Diaz won the crown and title of Miss Earth United States 2009 on July 22, 2009. She represented the United States in the 9th edition of Miss Earth beauty pageant, which was held at the Boracay Ecovillage Resort and Convention Center, in the Island of Boracay, Philippines, which started on November 1, 2009, and concluded on November 22, 2009. The Miss Earth winner serves as the spokesperson for the Miss Earth Foundation, the United Nations Environment Programme (UNEP) and other environmental organizations. There were 80 delegates from different countries and territories competed in the event.

=== Miss Tourism Intercontinental 2010 ===
Diaz competed in the 2010 pageant held in Miri, Sarawak, Malaysia on May 20. She finished as the second runner-up.

== Personal life ==
Diaz married her husband, Jason Case, in 2015. They have five children together.

== See also ==
Preceded by Jana Murrell	Miss Earth United States; 2009	Succeeded by Danielle Bounds
Preceded by Danielle Lacourse	Miss Rhode Island USA; 2008	Succeeded by Alysha Castonguay
