= Gloriette =

Elevated building in a garden

The Gloriette in the Schönbrunn Palace Garden, Vienna, Austria

A gloriette (from the 12th-century French gloire meaning "little room") is a building in a garden erected on a site that is elevated with respect to the surroundings. The structural execution and shape can vary greatly, often in the form of a pavilion or tempietto, more or less open on the sides.

== Schönbrunn Palace garden gloriette ==
The largest and probably best-known gloriette is in the Schönbrunn Palace garden in Vienna. Built in 1775 as the last building constructed in the garden according to the plans of Austrian imperial architect Johann Ferdinand Hetzendorf von Hohenberg as a "temple of renown" to serve as both a focal point and a lookout point for the garden, it was used as a dining hall and festival hall as well as a breakfast room for emperor Franz Joseph I. The dining hall, which was used until the end of the monarchy, today has a café in it, and on the roof an observation platform overlooks Vienna. The gloriette's decorative sculptures were made by the famous Salzburg sculptor Johann Baptist von Hagenauer. The gloriette was destroyed in the Second World War, but had already been restored by 1947, and was restored again in 1995, when its central part was closed with glass panes and converted to a café.

The gloriette is dedicated as a Monument to Just War, that which leads to peace. With the succession to the throne of Maria Theresa came first the War of the Austrian Succession (1740–1748) and later the Seven Years' War (1756–1763).

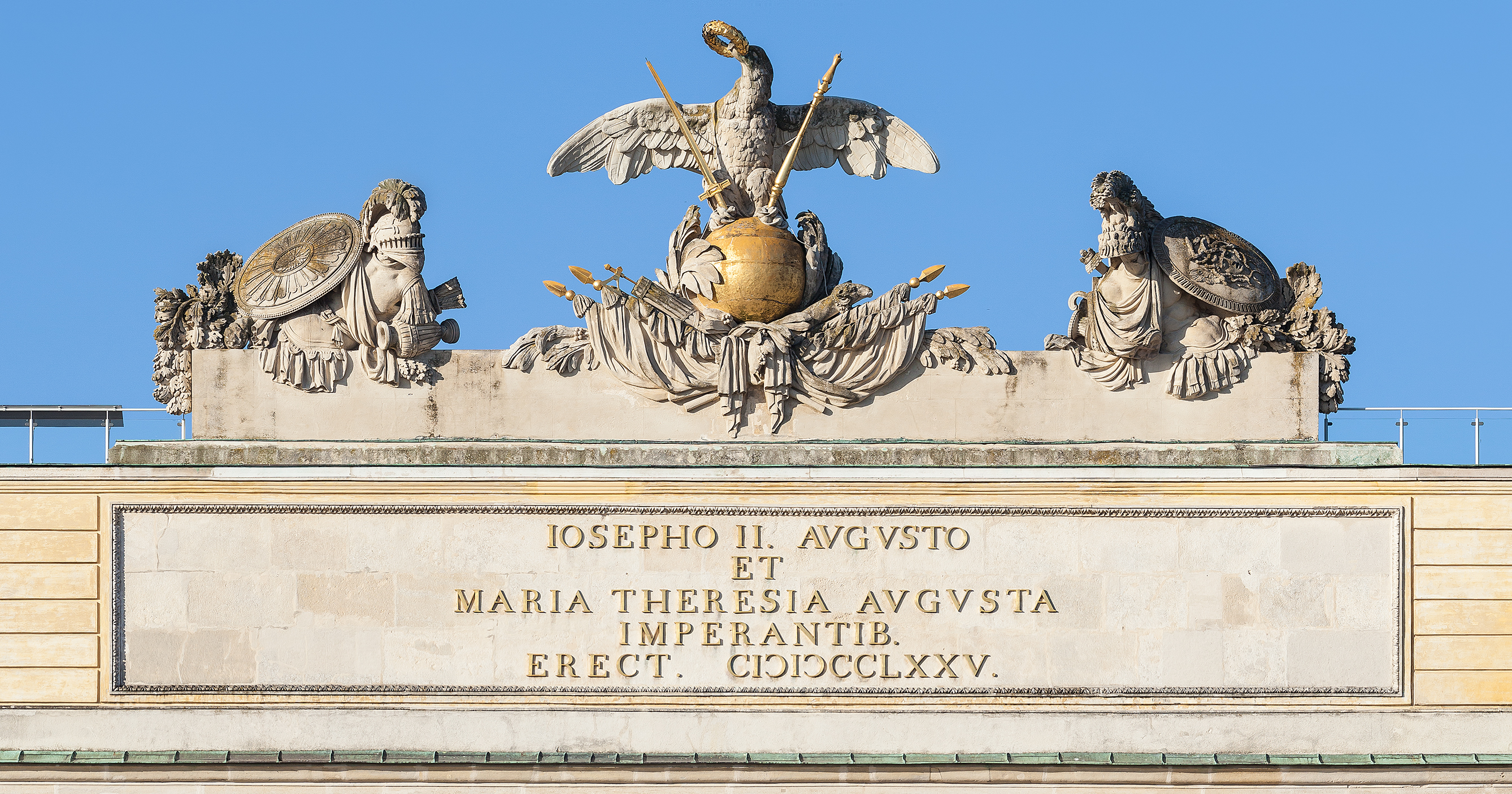
Inscription on the Gloriette in Vienna

The front face bears the following inscription:

IOSEPHO II. AVGVSTO ET MARIA THERESIA AVGVSTA IMPERANTIB. ERECT. CIƆIƆCCLXXV.

("Erected under the reign of Emperor Joseph II and Empress Maria Theresa, 1775.")

An essential part of the inscription is the addition of AVGVSTO and AVGVSTA, used as a link to the first Roman emperor and state god Augustus by his heirs and successors as finally the Habsburgs in their functions as emperors of the Holy Roman Empire of the German Nation. The year 1775 is written in Roman numerals following the apostrophus notation.

The gloriette served as the sixth 'Pit Stop' on The Amazing Race 23.

== Other architectural gloriettes ==
Other buildings designated "gloriettes" are, for example,

- in the garden of Schloss Esterházy in Eisenstadt (Burgenland, Austria);
- in the Park von Muskau (Germany);
- in the Bergpark Wilhelmshöhe in Kassel (Germany);
- in Trogir (Croatia);
- in Karlovy Vary (Czech Republic);
- Maiers-Gloriette, Fertőboz (Hungary);
- in the garden of the Brukenthal Palace in Sibiu (Romania);
- in the garden of Villa Olmo in Como (Italy);
- in the Jardin des Plantes in Paris (France);
- in Portmeirion (North Wales);
- in Leeds Castle (Kent);
- in Parque de María Luisa (Seville) there are numerous structures;
- and in Corfe Castle (Dorset).

== Non-architectural gloriettes ==
The word "gloriette" can also refer to a large birdcage, similar in form to the architectural gloriette, often made out of wrought iron or, more rarely, wood. In the garden of the Priory of Notre-Dame d'Orsan, many wood gloriettes decorate and overshadow the alleys. Climbing plants are often associated with this type of construction. Similarly, a modern-day wood and metal folly called Gloriette-R1 can be found on Mulholland Hwy, in front of the Hollywood Sign in Los Angeles.

== See also ==
- Loggia
