= Dago, Bandung =

Subdistrict in Bandung City, West Java, Indonesia

Coordinates: 6.8833°S 107.6197°E

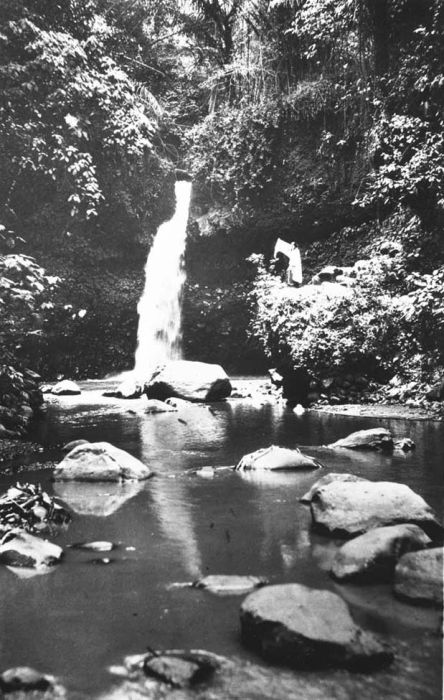
Waterfall in Dago during colonial period.

Dago is an area in Bandung, West Java, Indonesia. It covers Jalan H. Juanda (H. Juanda Street) and the surrounding area. The lower (southern) Dago area near Jalan Merdeka is one of the trendy areas of Bandung, with shops, shopping malls, cafes, boutiques, and many restaurants and entertainment centers.

The upper (northern) area has many old Dutch villas and wider boulevards with tall trees lining the streets. The famous Dago Tea House, built during Dutch colonial times, is located here. The Bandung Institute of Technology (ITB) is located just west of the upper Dago area and neighbors the Bandung Zoo. A major private hospital, St. Boromeus, is also located on the street. A major public transportation terminal is also nearby.

The extreme northern parts are called Dago Pakar, which in recent years have seen the construction of many new restaurants offering dramatic views and vistas of the greater Bandung area.

Curug Dago is a waterfall in Bukit Dago (Dago Hill), which is 12 meters high. Curug dago is a polluted river as many households release their waste directly into this river. This river is very polluted with plastic bottles.
