= Miss Teen America =

Beauty pageant

Miss Teen America is an American beauty contest that serves as a training ground for many young American girls, many of whom go on to win other titles. Winners have had ongoing columns in Supermodels Unlimited and Pageantry magazines. Miss Teen America is not associated with the Miss America Organization nor should it be confused with Miss Teen USA. In July 2010, Nikki Clark, President of Miss Teen America, Inc. became the new Executive Director of Miss Teen America. Miss Teen America 2020 has yet to be crowned.

== Winners ==
Year	Winner	State	Notes
1995-96	Bethany Logan	Connecticut	
1997-98	Christella Carpenter	Kentucky	
1999	Heather Konitshek	Connecticut	Now married and has her own photography business, Photographic Vision; Official Photographer of the International Junior Miss Pageant and Miss Teen America Pageant
2000	Amanda Zachary	Illinois	Competed in the Miss Indiana and Miss Illinois systems and won preliminary titles
2001	Cara Hays	Arkansas	
2002	Lacey Minchew	Georgia	Later Miss Louisiana USA 2009
2003	Alysha Castonguay	Rhode Island	Previously Miss Rhode Island Teen USA 2002 & Top 10 at Miss Teen USA 2002; Cheerleader for the New England Patriots from 2006 to 2008; Later Miss Teen Galaxy 2005 & Miss Rhode Island USA 2009
2004	Chelsea Fahey	Illinois	Competed in the Galaxy System; Featured by ABC news health beat story
2005	Meghan Bryan	North Carolina	
2006	Brittany Monico	Connecticut	
2007	Brittany Dawn Brannon	Arizona	Later Miss Arizona USA 2011
2008-09	Kaitlyn Tarpey	New York	Later Miss Connecticut 2013
2010	Katie Himes	Kentucky	
2011	Katarina Kneer	New Jersey	
2012	Eleana Frangedis	Florida	
2013	Lindsay Dobbs	Georgia	Later contestant on season 26 of The Bachelor
2014	Catherine Kirkland	South Carolina	
2015	Summer Rogers	South Carolina	
2016	Megan Whittaker	Texas	
2017	Ciana Pelekai	Hawaii	
2018	Olivia Occhingrossi	Florida	
2019	Jillian Elliott	Louisiana	

== Notable national contestants ==
- Marla Prete (Connecticut - 1997) - Miss Connecticut 2003
- Renelle Richardson (Connecticut - 1999) - Miss Connecticut 2000
- Tori Carter (Colorado & 4th RU at Nationals - 2001, Rocky Mountain State & 1st RU at Nationals - 2002) - Miss Colorado Teen USA 2004
- Christina Ellington (Connecticut - 2001 & 1st RU at Nationals) - Miss New York 2004 & Top 10 at Miss America 2005
- Candace Cragg (Florida - 2001 & 2nd RU at Nationals) - Miss Florida 2005 (resigned)
- Dana Daunis (Connecticut - 2002, Nutmeg State & Top 10 at Nationals - 2003) - Miss Connecticut 2007 & Preliminary Talent Winner at Miss America 2008
- Raquel Beezley (Southern California - 2002) - Miss California USA 2008 & Top 15 at Miss USA 2008
- Caressa Cameron (Commonwealth of Virginia - 2003 & 3rd RU at Nationals, Nation's Capitol - 2005) - Miss Virginia 2009 & Miss America 2010
- Jennifer Brooks (Connecticut - 2003 & Top 10 at Nationals) - Miss Connecticut Teen USA 2005
- Alla Ilushka (Minnesota - 2003) - Miss Minnesota Teen USA 2002, Top 10 at Miss Teen USA 2002, & Miss Minnesota USA 2007
- Hope Wiseman (Chesapeake - 2006 & Top 10 at Nationals) - Miss District of Columbia's Outstanding Teen 2009
- Savannah Schechter (New Jersey - 2008 & 1st RU at Nationals) - Miss New Jersey Teen USA 2011
- Brittany Dawn Brannon (Arizona - 2007 & Miss Teen America 2007) - Miss Arizona USA 2011
- Kaitlyn Tarpey (New York - 2008 & Miss Teen America 2008/09) - Miss Connecticut 2013
- Ciana Pelekai (Hawaii - 2017 Miss Teen America) - America's Got Talent Season 4 and Season 8 Finalist
