= Miss Rhode Island USA =

Beauty pageant competition

- Formation: 1952
- Type: Beauty pageant
- Headquarters: Cranston
- Location: Rhode Island
- Members: Miss USA
- Official language: English
- Key people: Deborah Miller; Cindy Provost
- Website: Official website

The Miss Rhode Island USA competition is the beauty pageant that selects the representative for the state Rhode Island in the Miss USA pageant. It is currently directed by D&D Productions.

Rhode Island made its first placement at Miss USA in 1961 and has been one of the most consistent states since 2000, with four semi-finalist placements and one first runner-up placement. On June 3, 2012, Olivia Culpo won the first Miss USA title from the state of Rhode Island. On December 19, 2012, Culpo became the first Rhode Islander to win the title of Miss Universe.

Victoria Cuartas of East Providence was crowned Miss Rhode Island USA 2026 on July 19, 2026, at Uptown Theater in Providence. She will represent Rhode Island at Miss USA 2026.

== Gallery of titleholders ==
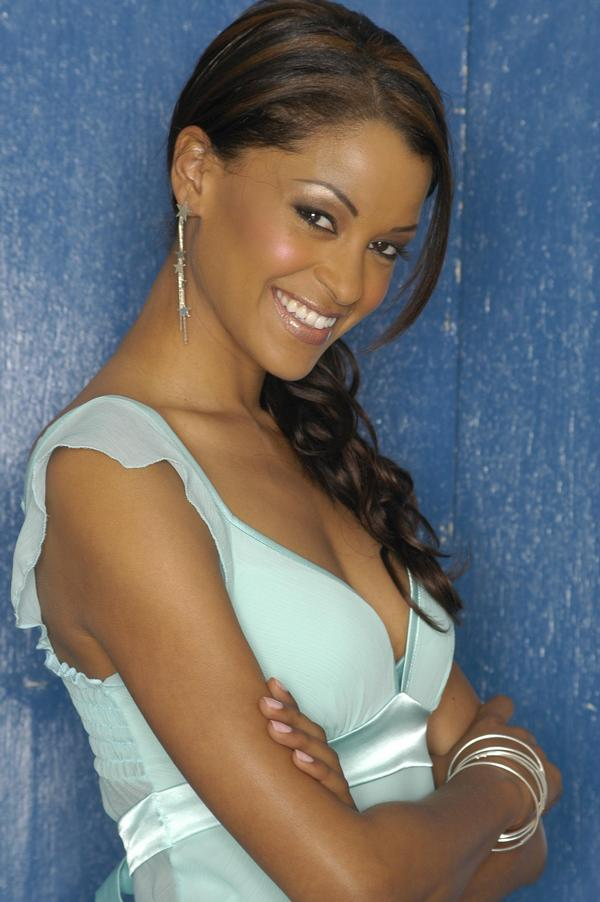
Claudia Jordan, Miss Rhode Island USA 1997 (pictured in 2009)

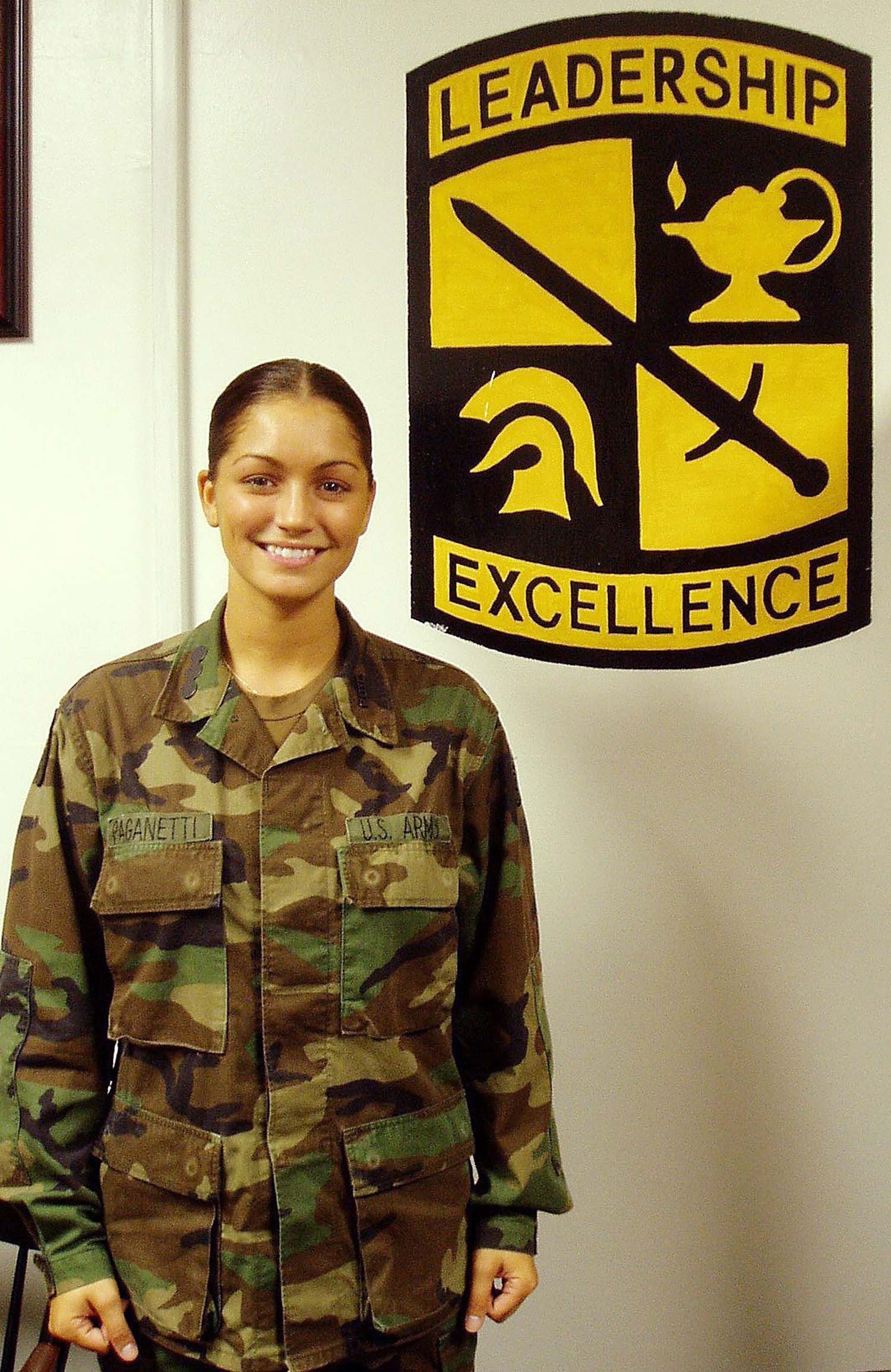
Allison Paganetti, Miss Rhode Island USA 2005

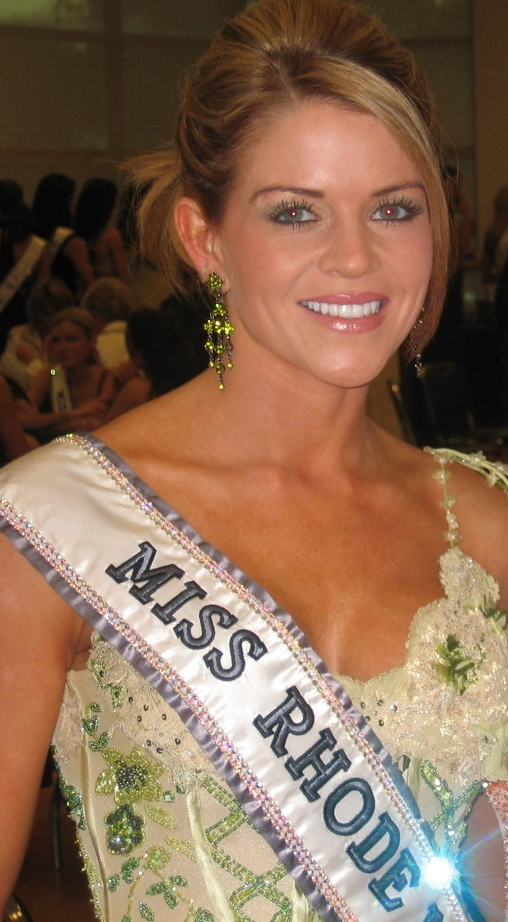
Leeann Tingley, Miss Rhode Island USA 2006

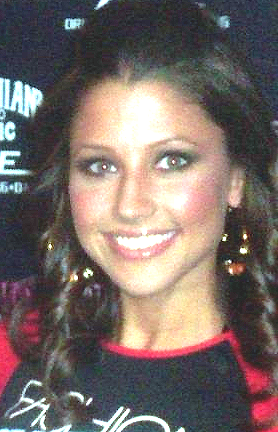
Danielle Lacourse, Miss Rhode Island USA 2007

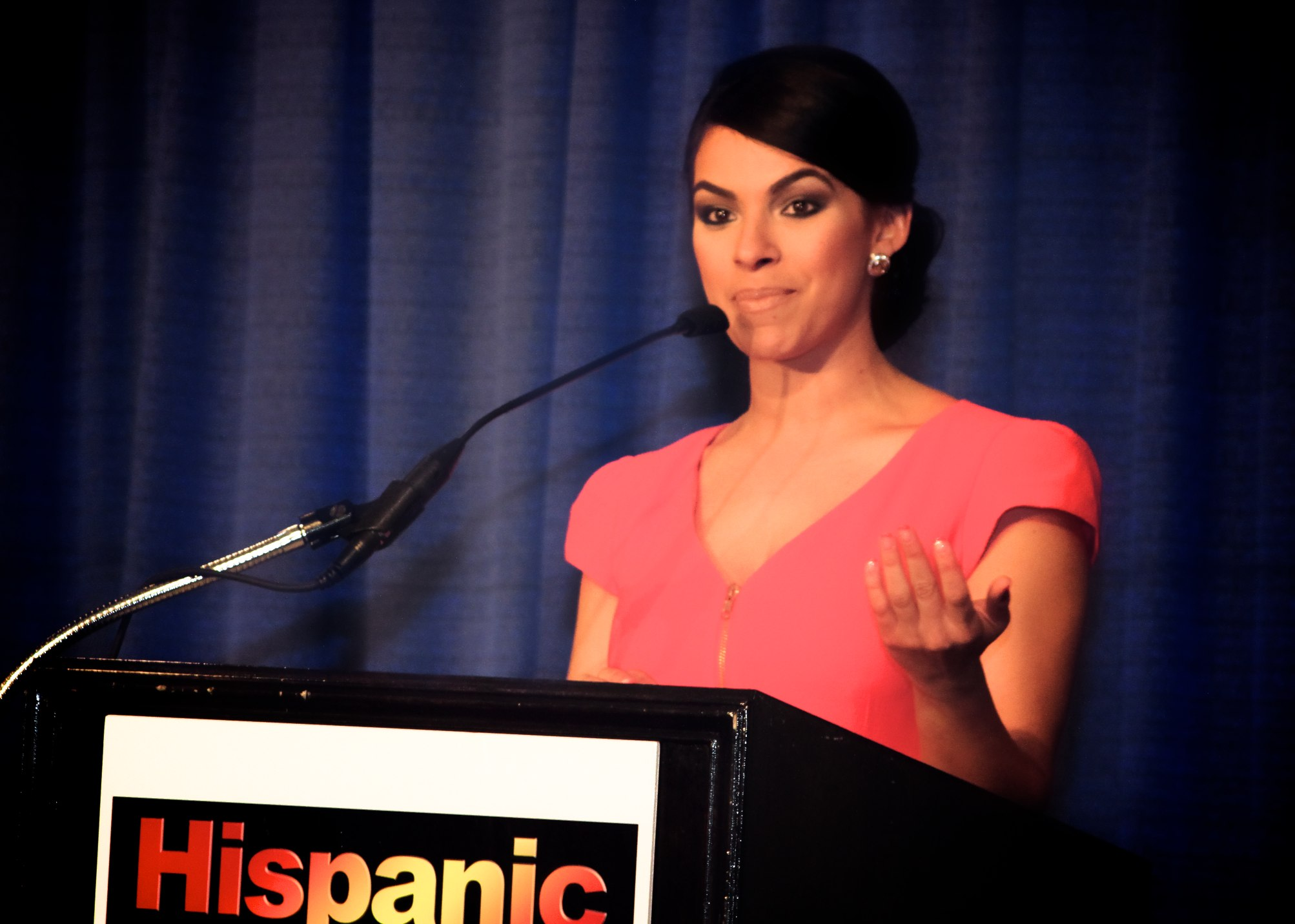
Amy Diaz, Miss Rhode Island USA 2008

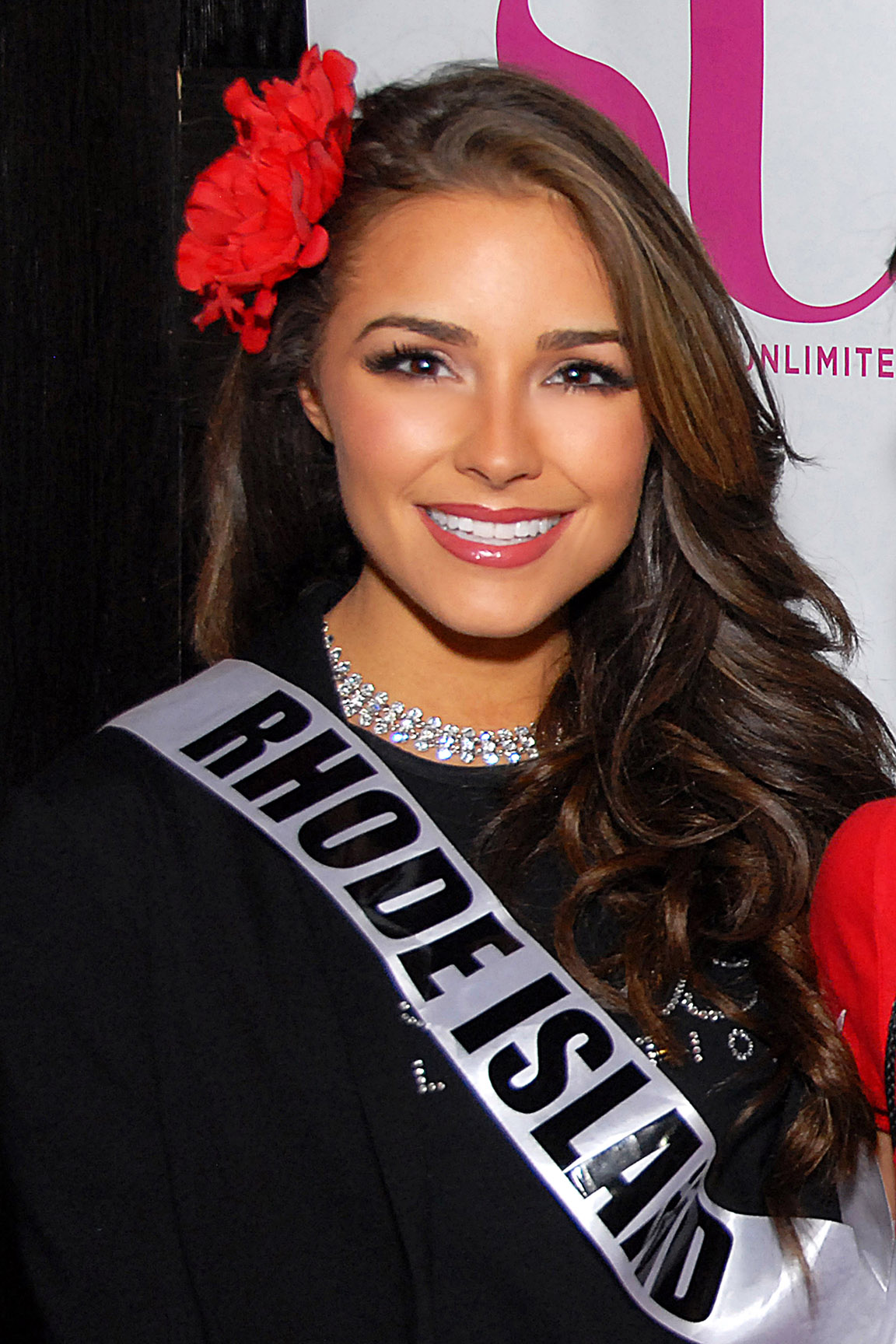
Olivia Culpo, Miss Rhode Island USA 2012, Miss USA 2012 and Miss Universe 2012

== Results summary ==
=== Placements ===
- Miss USA: Olivia Culpo (2012)
- 1st runner-up: Danielle Lacourse (2007)
- 2nd runners-up: Gayle White (1973), Anea Garcia (2015)
- Top 10/11/12: Jennifer Aubin (1995), Claudia Jordan (1997), Yanaiza Alvarez (2001), Janet Sutton (2002), Leeann Tingley (2006)
- Top 15/20: Joan Zeller (1961), Amy Diaz (2008), Brianna Vega (2025)

Rhode Island holds a record of 12 placements at Miss USA.

=== Awards ===
- Miss Congeniality: Christina Palavra (2014)

== Winners ==
Color key

- Declared as Winner
- Ended as runner-up
- Ended as one of the finalists or semifinalists

Year	Name	Hometown	Age^{1}	Local title	Placement at Miss USA	Special awards at Miss USA	Notes
2026	Victoria Cuartas	East Providence	35	Miss Riverside			
2025	Brianna Vega	Providence	29	Miss Downtown Providence	Top 20		
2024	Kaitlynne Santana	Woonsocket	22	Miss Woonsocket			
2023	Mary Malloy	Cumberland	26				Previously Miss Rhode Island Teen USA 2015
2022	Elaine Collado	Providence	27				Previously Miss Rhode Island Teen USA 2013
2021	Karly Laliberte	Pawtucket	26				Shortest reigning Miss Rhode Island USA (9 months and 21 days)
2020	Jonét Nichelle	Providence	24				New England Patriots Cheerleader; Longest reigning Miss Rhode Island USA (1 year, 10 months, and 2 days); Third longest reigning Miss USA state titleholder in the organization's history
2019	Nicole Pallozzi	Providence	22				
2018	Daescia DeMoranville	Johnston	21				Later Miss World America Rhode Island 2018
2017	Kelsey Swanson	Cranston	22				
2016	Theresa Agonia	Providence	23				
2015	Anea Garcia	Cranston	19		2nd runner-up		Later Miss Grand International 2015 as Dominican Republic, later resigned/dethroned
2014	Christina Palavra	Providence	18			Miss Congeniality	Season 16 Model on Project Runway
2013	Brittany Stenovitch	Cranston	19				
2012	Olivia Culpo	Cranston	19		Miss USA 2012		Later Miss Universe 2012
2011	Kate McCaughey	Lincoln	22				
2010	Kristina Primavera	Narragansett	22				Previously Miss Rhode Island Teen USA 2003
2009	Alysha Castonguay	Woonsocket	22				Previously Miss Rhode Island Teen USA 2002 and Top 10 Semifinalist at Miss Teen USA 2002, Previously Miss Teen America 2003
2008	Amy Diaz	Johnston	23		Top 15		Previously Miss Rhode Island Teen USA 2001; Later Miss Earth United States 2009 and competed in Miss Earth 2009; Later won Season 23 of The Amazing Race
2007	Danielle Lacourse	North Providence	21		1st runner-up		
2006	Leeann Tingley	East Greenwich	24		Top 10		
2005	Allison Paganetti	North Kingstown	21				Appears on CBS reality show Hunted as part of the hunter team "Echo".
2004	Sarah Bettencourt	Lincoln	20				
2003	Krisily Kennedy	Warwick	23				Runner-up on season 7 of The Bachelor and a contestant on the first season of Bachelor Pad
2002	Janet Sutton	Narragansett	23		Top 12		
2001	Yanaiza A. Alvarez	Providence	23		Top 10		Was a contestant on the show Fear Factor Episode 2.6 original air date 1/14/2002
2000	Heidi St. Pierre	Harrisville	23				
1999	Claire DeSimone	Warwick					Later Mrs. Massachusetts America 2004 and Top 10 semi-finalist at Mrs. America 2004 under her married name, Claire O'Connor.
1998	Connie Harrolle	East Providence					
1997	Claudia Jordan	East Providence	23		Top 10		Previously Miss Rhode Island Teen USA 1990; Suitcase model on Deal or No Deal
1996	Karen Bradley	Providence	19				
1995	Jennifer Aubin	Woonsocket	20		Top 12		
1994	RayeAnne Johnson	Lincoln					Previously Miss Rhode Island Teen USA 1987
1993	Juli Roach	Wakefield					
1992	Yvette Hernandez	Providence					
1991	Lynne Michael	Cranston					
1990	Susan Lima	West Warwick					
1989	Debra Damiano	Providence					
1988	Cindy Geronda	North Providence					
1987	Lisa Benson	North Kingstown					
1986	Donna Silva	Cranston					
1985	Dana Wilson	Riverside					
1984	Debbie Mowry	North Providence					
1983	Allegra Hendricks	Providence					
1982	Peggy McGraw	Scituate					
1981	Patti Reo	Cranston					
1980	Robyn Hall	Pawtucket					
1979	Theresa Patterson	Lincoln					
1978	Sharon Lee McGarry	Warwick					
1977	Susan Carten	Cranston					
1976	Kathleen Confreda	Warwick					
1975	Marice Love	Providence					
1974	Debra Anne Cerroni	Smithfield					
1973	Gayle White	Providence	21		2nd runner-up		
1972	Jeanne Lemay	West Warwick					
1971	Laurie Stahle	North Kingstown					
1970	Rebecca Galleshaw	Warwick					
1969	Donna Lewis	Providence					
1968	Betty Lou Whitmore	Providence					
1967	Nancy Giuliano	Woonsocket					
1966	Barbara Williams	Providence					
1965	Paula M. Farrow	Warwick	21				
1964	Carol Ann Tantimonico	Johnston					
1963	Rosemary Jane Dickinson	Providence					
1962	Marilyn Ann Scott	Pawtucket					
1961	Joan Marie Zeller	Riverside	23		Semi-finalist		
1960	Lorelei Sue White	Cranston	20				
1959	Gloria Ryder	Providence					
1958	Claire DiPaolo	Providence					
1957	Myrna Altieri	Cranston					
1956	Sandra Vozella	Point Judith					
1955	Beverly Jansen	Providence					
1954	Joyce Anne Sandberg	Warwick					Previously crowned Miss Rhode Island in 1953. Later served as First Lady of Rhode Island from 1973 to 1977.
1953	Barbara Rose Deigman	Providence					
1952	Delores Selinder	Providence					

^{1} Age at the time of the Miss Rhode Island USA pageant
