= Henningsvær Bridges =

Henningsvær Bridges Henningsværbruene
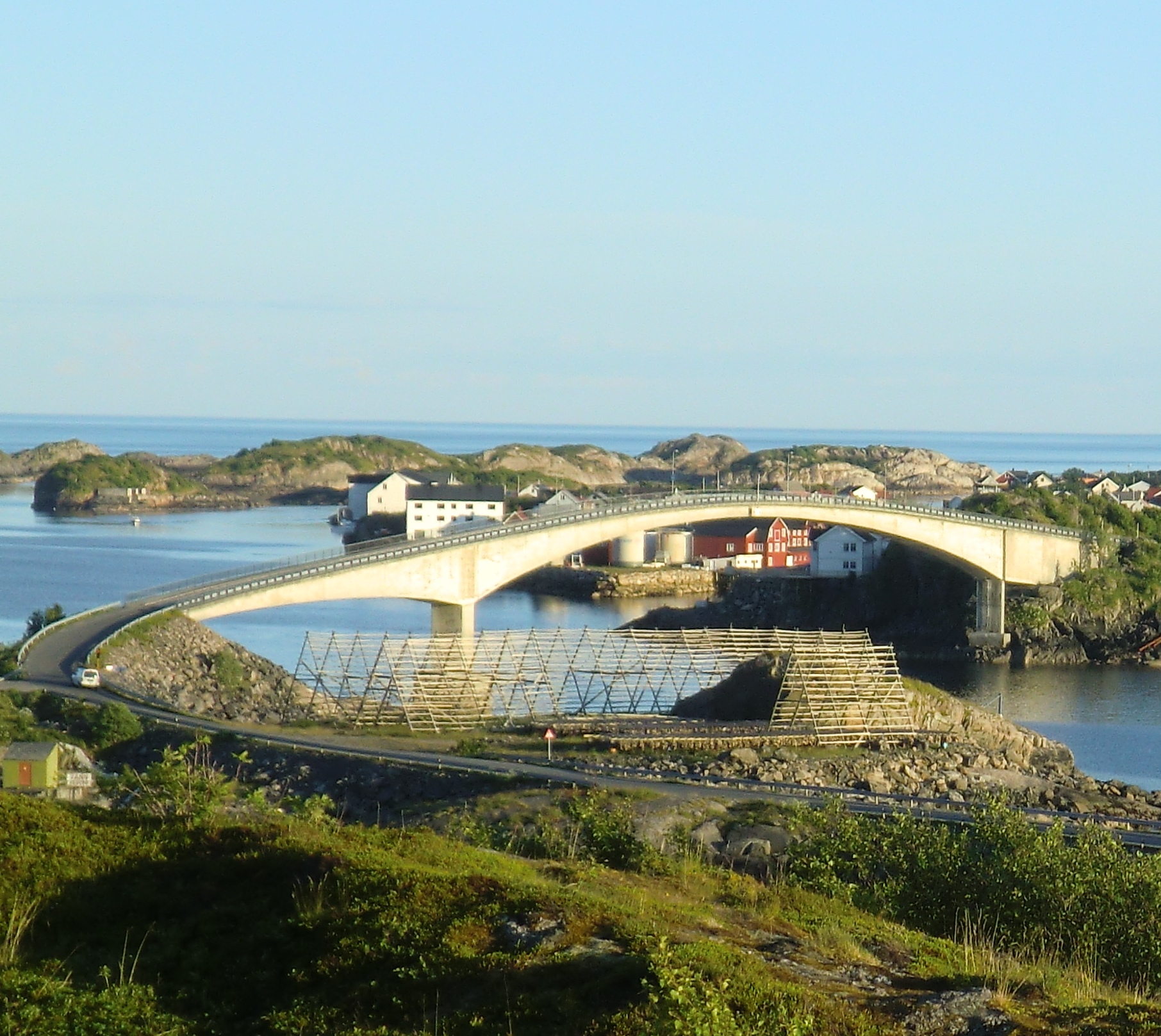
- View of the Henningsvær Bridge
- Coordinates: 68°09′35″N 14°12′53″E
- Carries: Fv816
- Locale: Vågan, Norway

Characteristics
- Material: Concrete

History
- Opened: 1983

Location
- Interactive map of Henningsvær Bridges

The Henningsvær Bridges (Norwegian: Henningsværbruene) are two box girder cantilever bridges made of prestressed concrete. The bridges connect the fishing village and island of Henningsvær to the rest of Vågan Municipality on the main island of Austvågøya in Nordland county, Norway.

The two bridges are called the Engøysundet Bridge and Henningsvær Bridge. The Engøysundet Bridge is the northern bridge and it is 194 metres (636 ft) long with a main span of 122 metres (400 ft). The Henningsvær Bridge is further south and it is 257 metres (843 ft) long with a main span of 150 metres (490 ft). The bridges were opened in 1983. They are among the many bridges that connect the islands of Lofoten to each other.

== See also ==
- List of bridges in Norway
- List of bridges in Norway by length
- List of bridges
- List of bridges by length
