= Al Khatim Desert =

Desert in the United Arab Emirates

Coordinates: 24.2°N 54.833333°E

Ecology
- Biome: Desert

Geography
- Country: United Arab Emirates

Al Khatim Desert is a desert between Al Ain and Abu Dhabi.

In the area off-road tracks exist, which are often used by local tour operators offering desert safari tours. These routes follow natural valleys formed by alluvial plains, which direct underground runoff water from the Omani mountains toward Abu Dhabi. The landscape is characterized by its dunes and relatively undeveloped desert terrain.

Al Khatim Desert Road rock is an old desert high way with one lien each side it is in Al Khatim deserts in Abu Dhabi, It lies near the Road E22 in the middle between Abu Dhabi and Al Ain.

The desert is sometimes used by first timer desert drivers due to its proximity of 80 kilometres (50 mi) from Abu Dhabi City, where the sand dunes are described as more challenging.
