= Bandung Zoo =

Kebun Binatang Bandung
- Interactive map of Kebun Binatang Bandung
- 6°53′25″S 107°36′25″E
- Date opened: 1933; 93 years ago
- Location: Bandung, West Java, Indonesia
- No. of animals: 1,600
- No. of species: 218
- Website: www.bandung-zoo.com

Kebun Binatang Bandung or Bandung Zoological Gardens is a zoo located in Bandung, West Java, Indonesia. It was created in 1933 when two existing zoos in the city (Cimindi zoo and Dago Atas zoo) were combined and moved to the current location on Taman Sari street. The new zoo was located in "Jubileum Park", a botanical garden created in 1923 to celebrate the Silver Jubilee of Queen Wilhelmina of the Netherlands.
