= List of Miss Teen USA titleholders =

Miss Teen USA is an American beauty pageant that has been held annually since 1983, either under the direct management of the Miss Universe Organization, or beginning with the 2021 competition, as a licensed pageant, until the 2022 competition. It was already an established national pageant before Miss Universe, Inc. began its own version of it in 1983.

The first Miss Teen USA competition first took place as a mail-in photo contest conducted by Teen magazine in 1959. It later took place as a live stage event.

== Titleholders ==
=== 1959 ===
- 1959: Peggy Collins, 17, of Lake Charles, Louisiana.

=== 1962 to 1968 ===
Miss Teen USA titleholders from 1962 to 1968 include:

- 1962: Linda Henning, 15, of Sioux Falls, South Dakota.
- 1963: Judy Adams, 16, of Ohio.
- 1964: Nancy Spry of Van Nuys, California.
- 1965: Susan Henning, 18, of Palos Verdes, California.
- 1966: Cindy Lewis.
- 1967: Sandee Jones, 18, of Anaheim, California. Miss Teen U.S.A. and Runner Up for Miss Teen International 1967.
- 1968: Pamela Martin, 18, of Birmingham, Michigan.

1969 Miss Teenage USA -Debbie Williams of Baton Rouge La -Broadmoor High School

=== 1980 to 1982 ===
Miss Teen USA titleholders from 1980 to 1982 include:

- 1980: Susan McDannold, 19, of St. Albans, West Virginia.
- 1981: Tammy Jo Hopkins, 17, of Omaha, Nebraska (partial reign, relinquished title to Susan McDannold).
- 1981: Susan McDannold, 19, of St. Albans, West Virginia (1980 titleholder also).
- 1982: Hugrun Ragnarsson, 18, of Long Island, New York.

=== 1983 to present ===
This is a list of delegates who have won the Miss Teen USA beauty pageant during the era when it was run by or associated with the Miss Universe Organization, including to the present day.

Key

- Declared as winner
- Ended as runner-up
- Ended as one of the finalists or semifinalists

Year	Miss Teen USA	Age	State	Hometown	Placement at Miss Teen Universe
1983	Ruth Zakarian	17	(New York (state)) New York	Amsterdam	Did not send representative
1984	Cherise Haugen	17	Illinois	Sleepy Hollow	Did not send representative
1985	Kelly Hu	16	Hawaii	Honolulu	Did not send representative
1986	Allison Brown	17	Oklahoma	Edmond	Did not send representative
1987	Kristi Addis	16	Mississippi	Holcomb	Did not send representative
1988	Mindy Duncan	16	Oregon	Hillsboro	Did not send representative
1989	Brandi Sherwood	18	Idaho	Idaho Falls	Did not send representative
1990	Bridgette Wilson	16	Oregon	Gold Beach	Did not send representative
1991	Janel Bishop	17	New Hampshire	Manchester	Did not send representative
1992	Jamie Solinger	17	Iowa	Altoona	Did not send representative
1993	Charlotte Lopez	16	Vermont	Dorset	Did not send representative
1994	Shauna Gambill	17	California	Acton	Did not send representative
1995	Keylee Sue Sanders	18	Kansas	Louisburg	Did not send representative
1996	Christie Lee Woods	18	Texas	Huntsville	Did not send representative
1997	Shelly Moore	18	Tennessee	Knoxville	Did not send representative
1998	Vanessa Minnillo	17	South Carolina	Charleston	Did not send representative
1999	Ashley Coleman	17	Delaware	Camden	Did not send representative
2000	Jillian Parry	18	Pennsylvania	Newtown	Did not send representative
2001	Marissa Whitley	18	Missouri	Springfield	Did not send representative
2002	Vanessa Marie Semrow	17	Wisconsin	Rhinelander	Did not send representative
2003	Tami Farrell	18	Oregon	Phoenix	Did not send representative
2004	Shelley Hennig	17	Louisiana	Destrehan	Did not send representative
2005	Allie LaForce	16	Ohio	Vermilion	Did not send representative
2006	Katie Blair	18	Montana	Billings	Did not send representative
2007	Hilary Cruz	18	Colorado	Louisville	Did not send representative
2008	Stevi Perry	18	Arkansas	Hamburg	Did not send representative
2009	Stormi Henley	18	Tennessee	Crossville	Did not send representative
2010	Kamie Crawford	17	Maryland	Potomac	Did not send representative
2011	Danielle Doty	18	Texas	Harlingen	Did not send representative
2012	Logan West	18	Connecticut	Southington	Did not send representative
2013	Cassidy Wolf	19	California	Temecula	Did not send representative
2014	K. Lee Graham	17	South Carolina	Chapin	Did not send representative
2015	Katherine Haik	15	Louisiana	Franklinton	Did not send representative
2016	Karlie Hay	18	Texas	Tomball	Did not send representative
2017	Sophia Domínguez-Heithoff	17	Missouri	Kansas City	Did not send representative
2018	Hailey Colborn	17	Kansas	Wichita	Did not send representative
2019	Kaliegh Garris	18	Connecticut	New Haven	Did not send representative
2020	Kiʻilani Arruda	18	Hawaii	Kapaʻa	Did not send representative
2021	Breanna Myles	18	Florida	Port St. Lucie	Did not send representative
2022	Faron Medhi	18	Nebraska	Omaha	Did not send representative
2023	UmaSofia Srivastava (resigned)	16	New Jersey	Morris Plains	Did not send representative
2024	Addison "Addie" Carver	17	Mississippi	Monticello	Did not send representative
2025	Mailyn Marsh	17	Missouri	Ozark	1st Runner-Up
2026	Kiran Reddy	18	(Georgia (U.S. state)) Georgia	Douglas	4th Runner-Up

=== Winners gallery ===
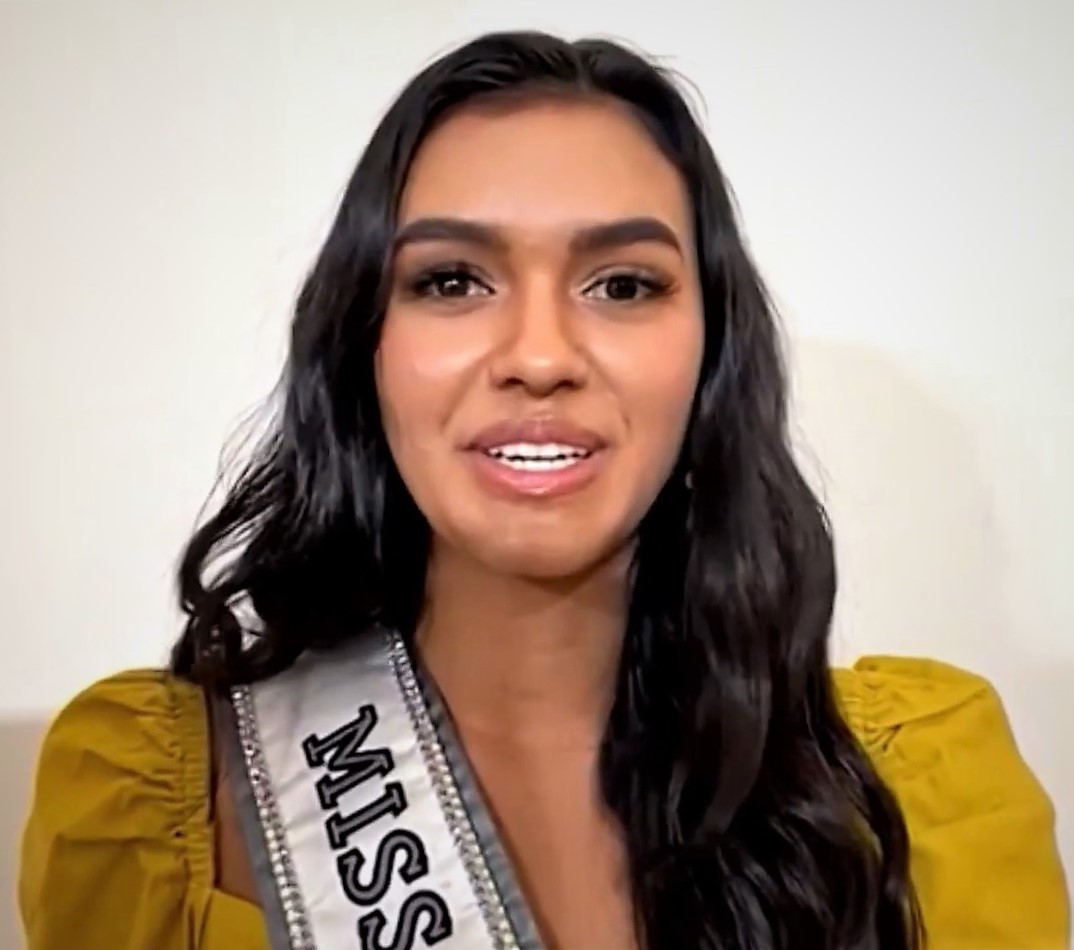
Miss Teen USA 2020
Kiʻilani Arruda, Hawaii

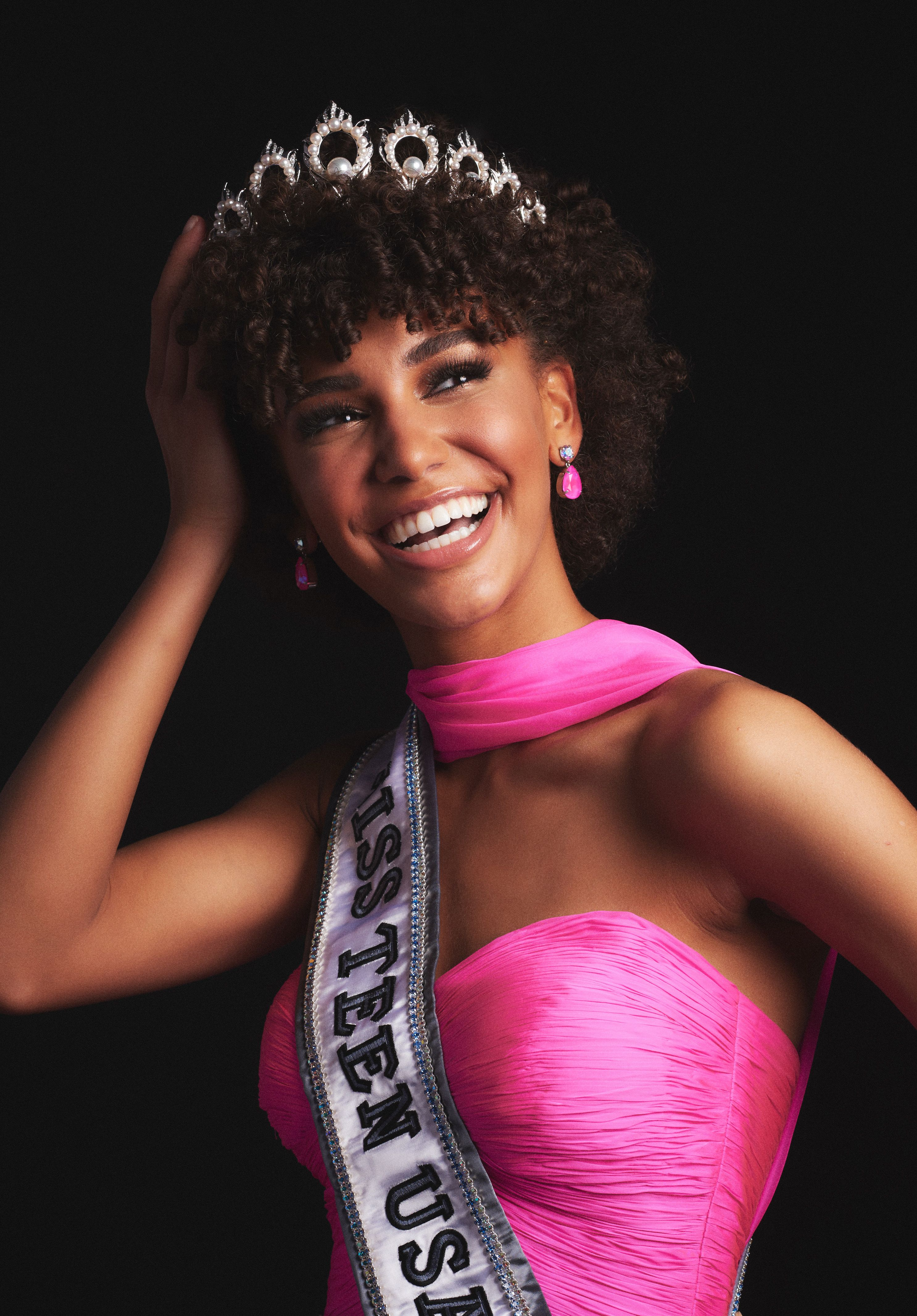
Miss Teen USA 2019
Kaliegh Garris, Connecticut

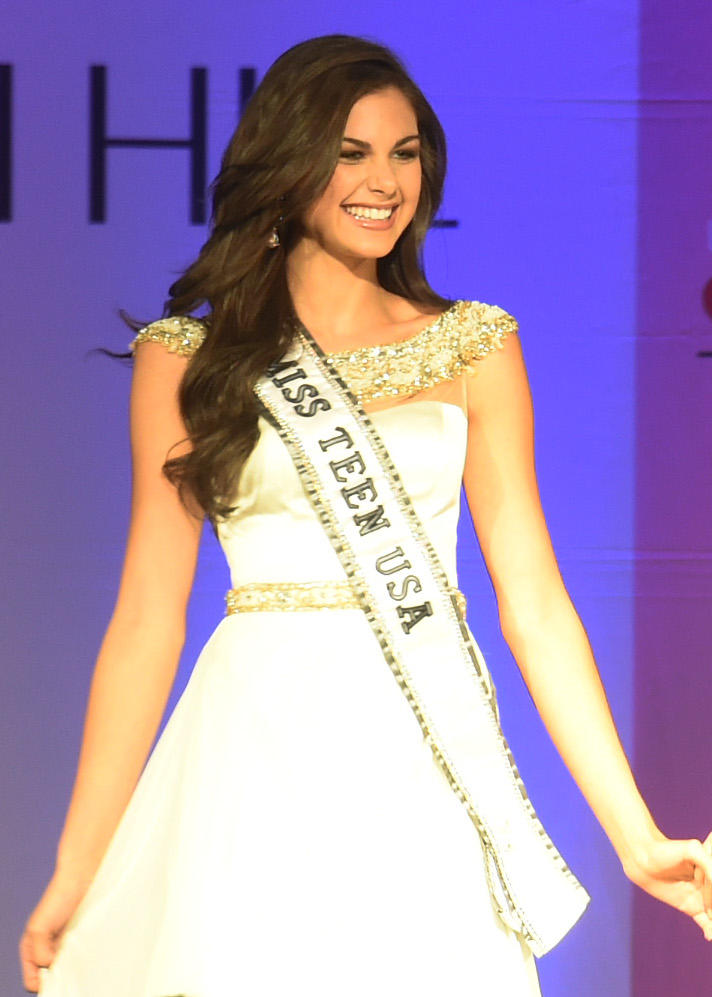
Miss Teen USA 2015
Katherine Haik, Louisiana

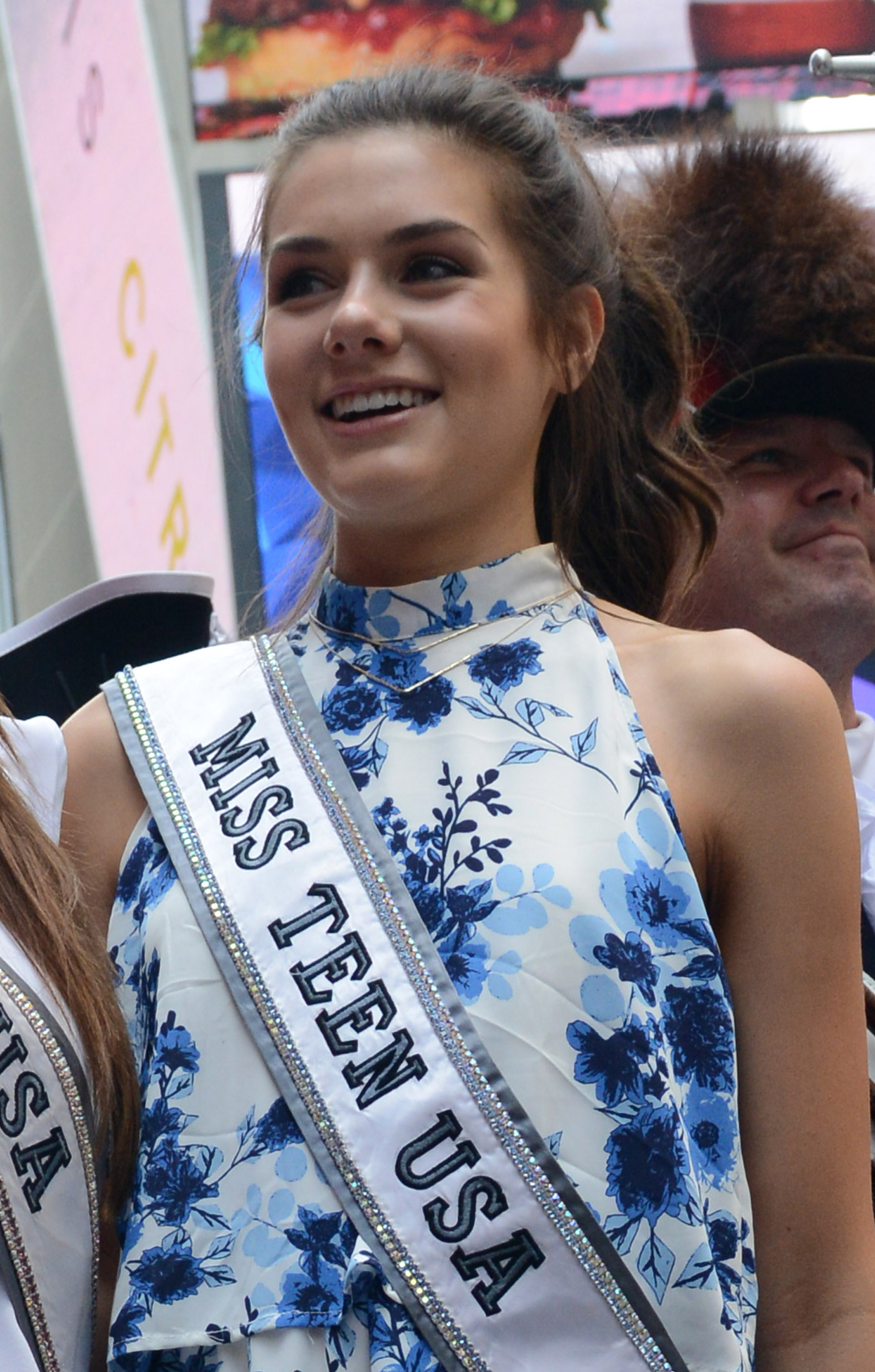
Miss Teen USA 2014
K. Lee Graham, South Carolina

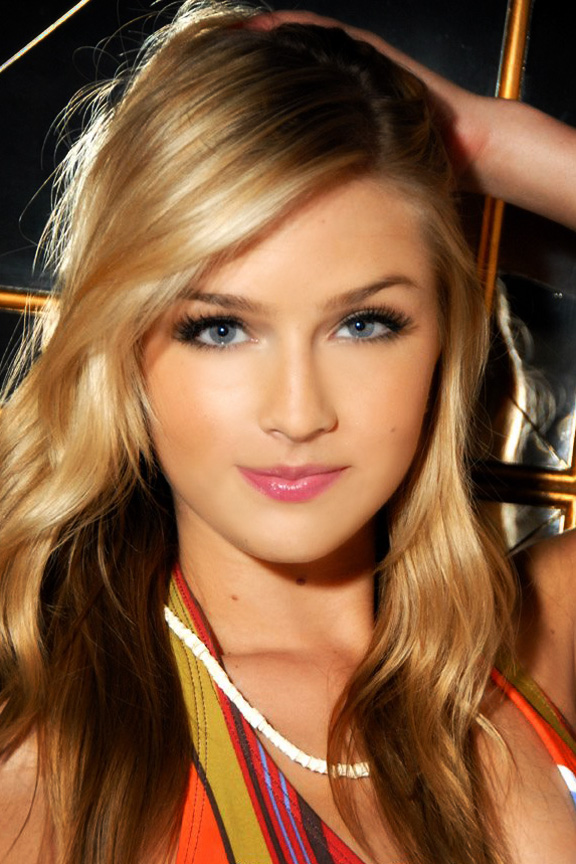
Miss Teen USA 2013
Cassidy Wolf, California

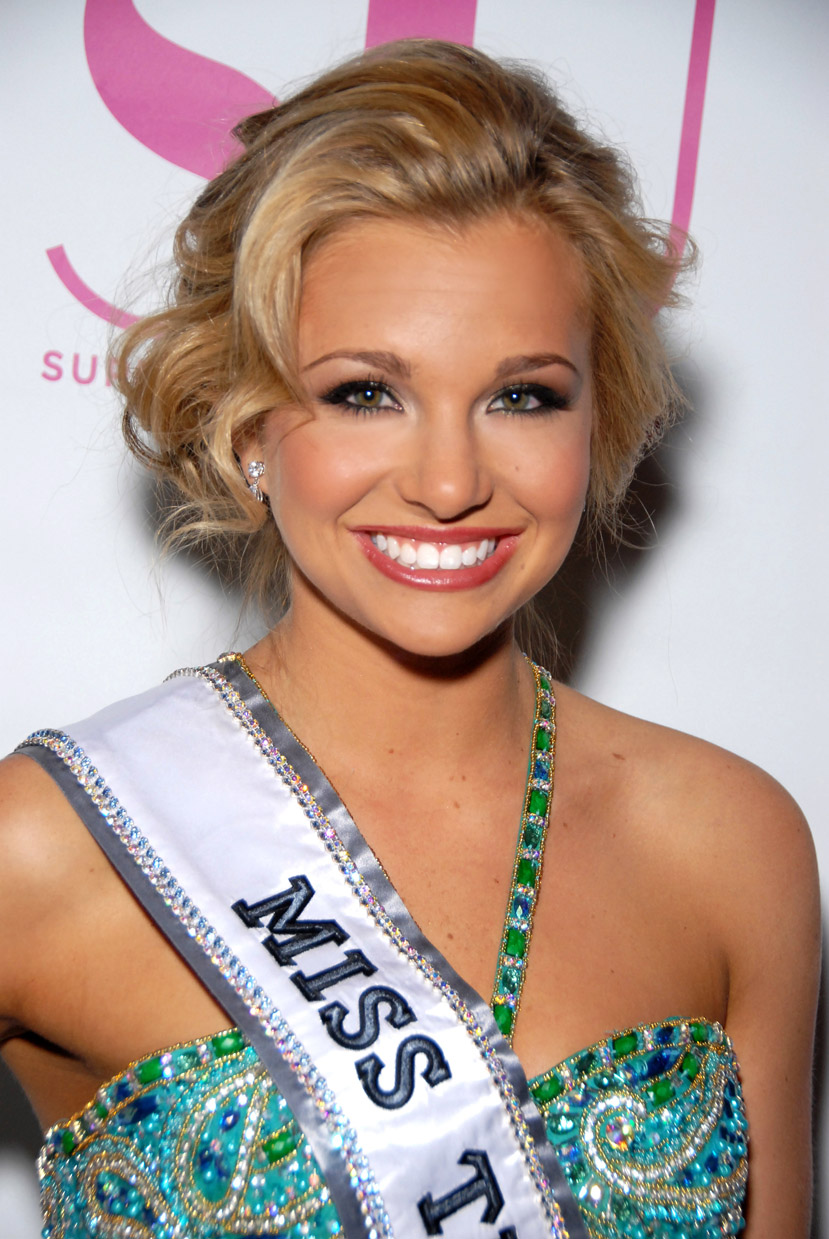
Miss Teen USA 2011
Danielle Doty, Texas

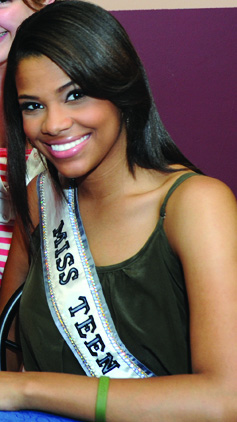
Miss Teen USA 2010
Kamie Crawford, Maryland

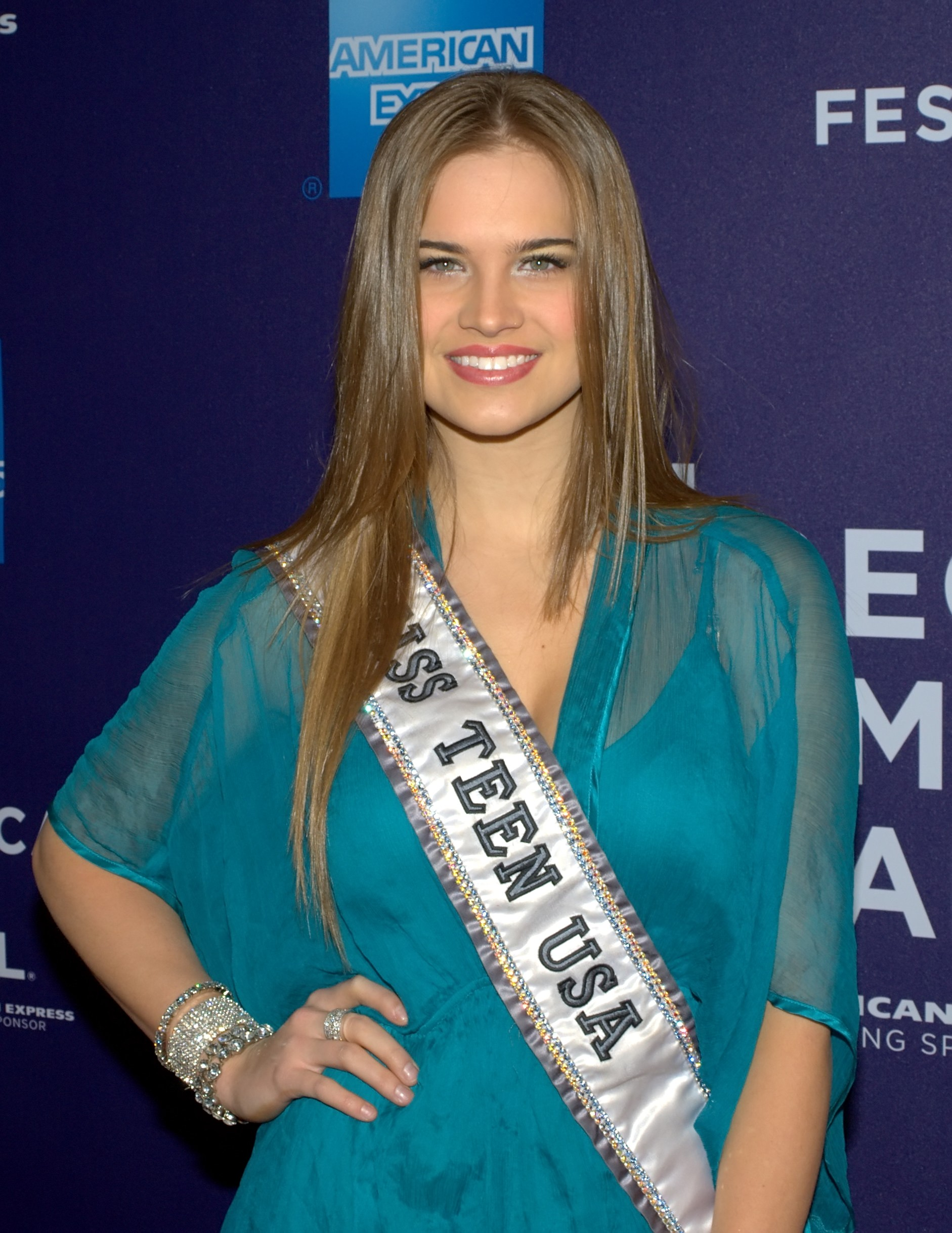
Miss Teen USA 2009
Stormi Henley, Tennessee

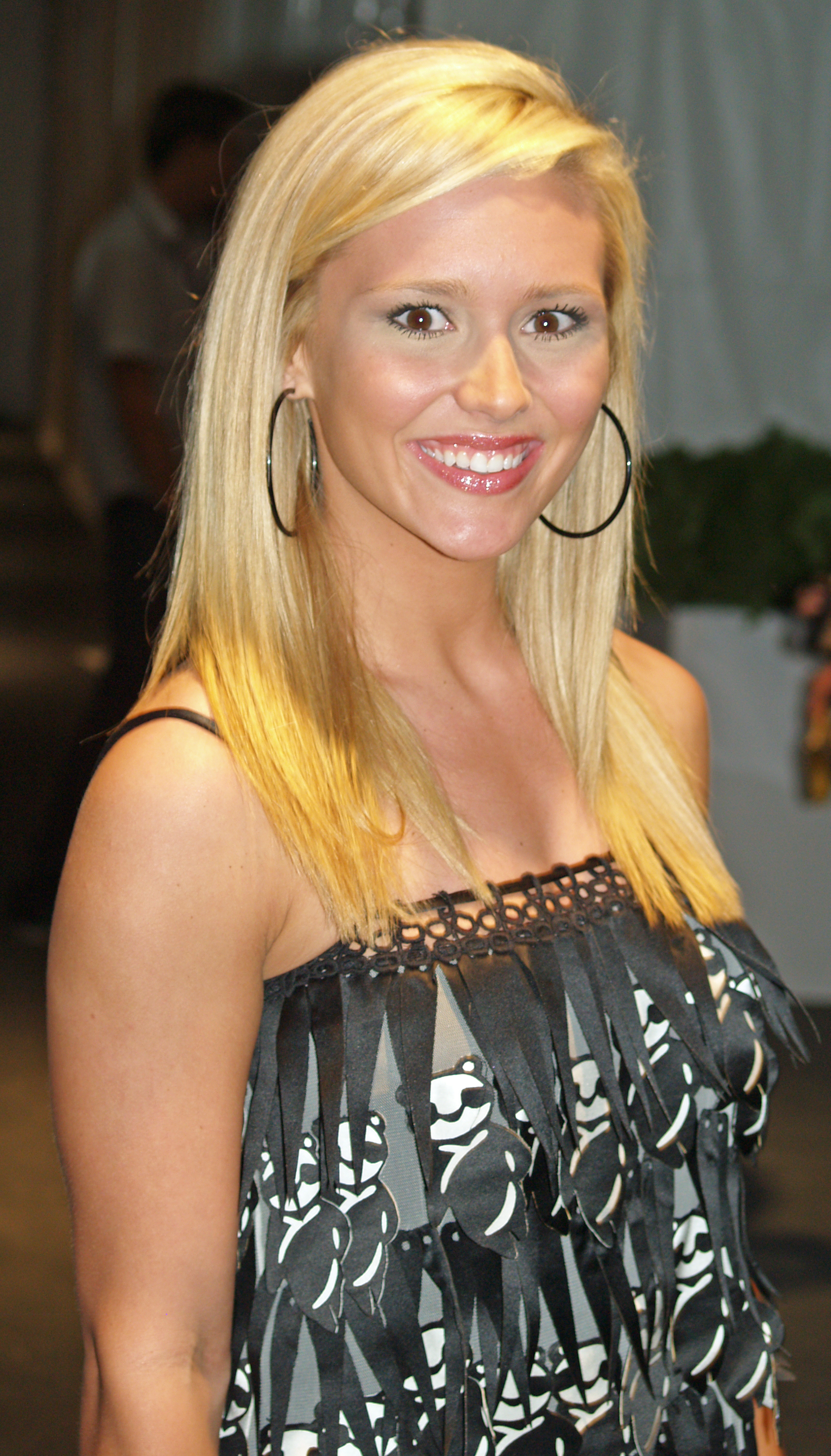
Miss Teen USA 2008
Stevi Perry, Arkansas

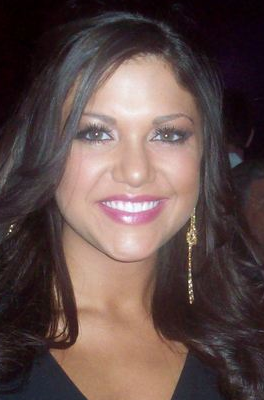
Miss Teen USA 2007
Hilary Cruz, Colorado

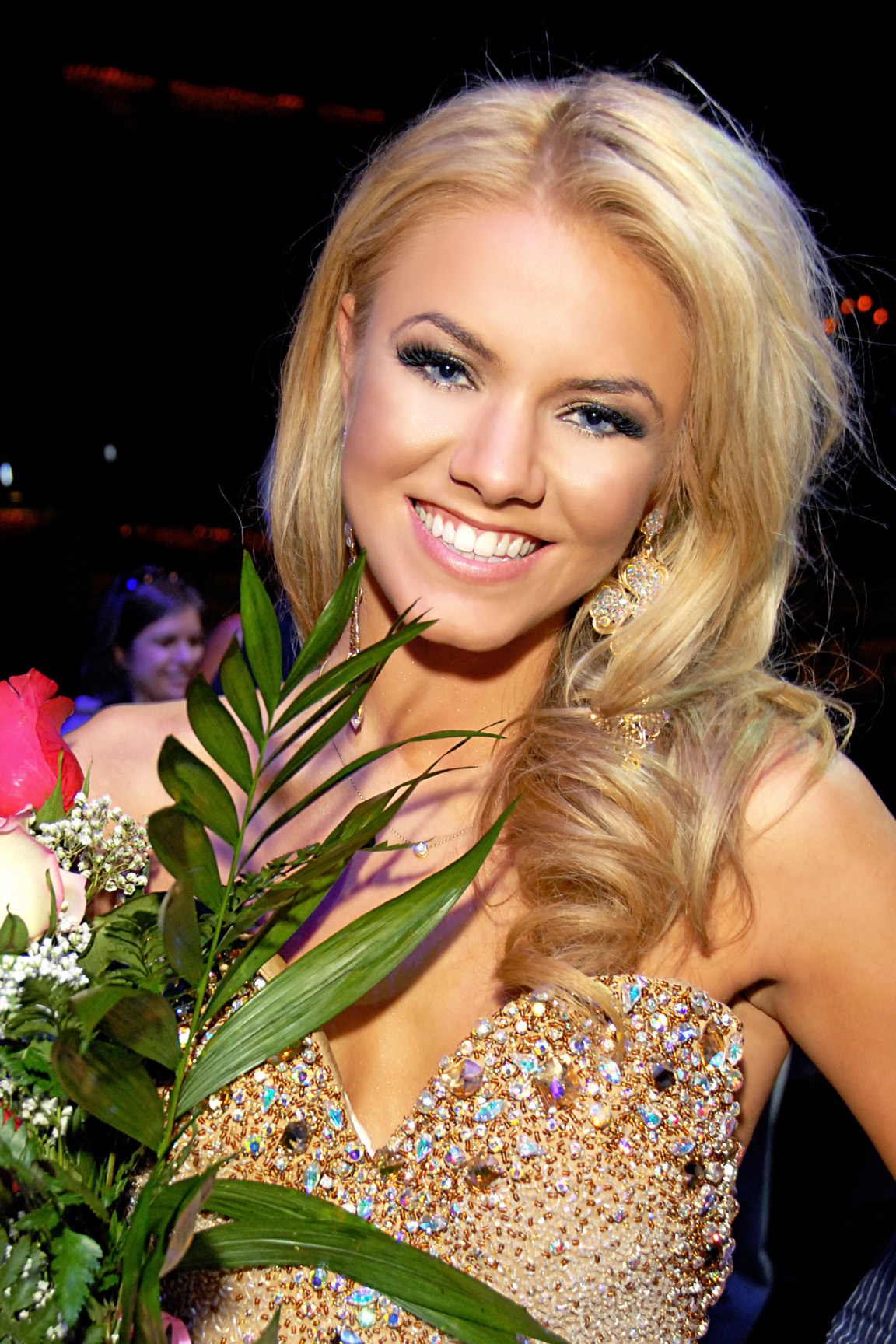
Miss Teen USA 2006
Katie Blair, Montana

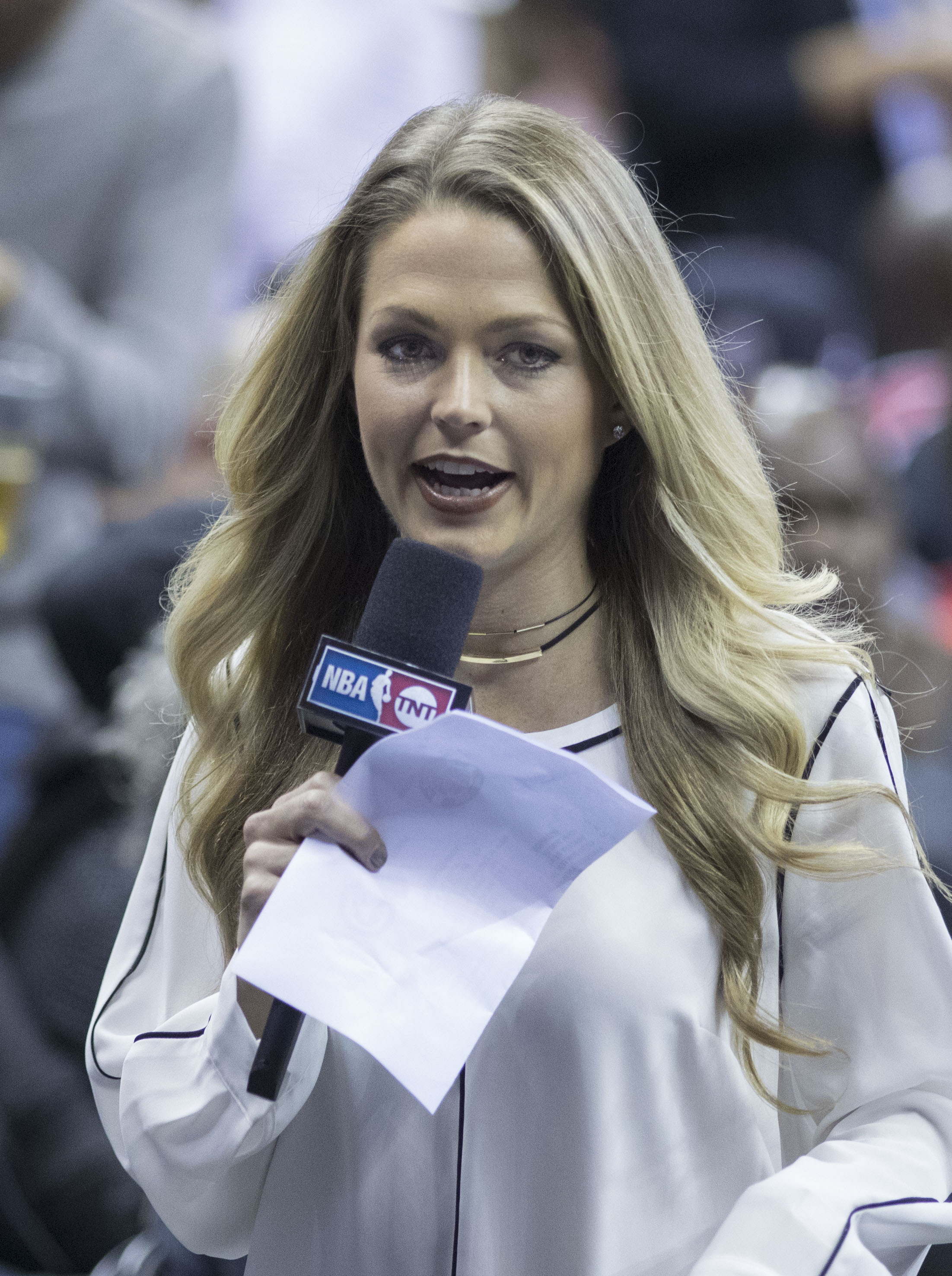
Miss Teen USA 2005
Allie LaForce, Ohio

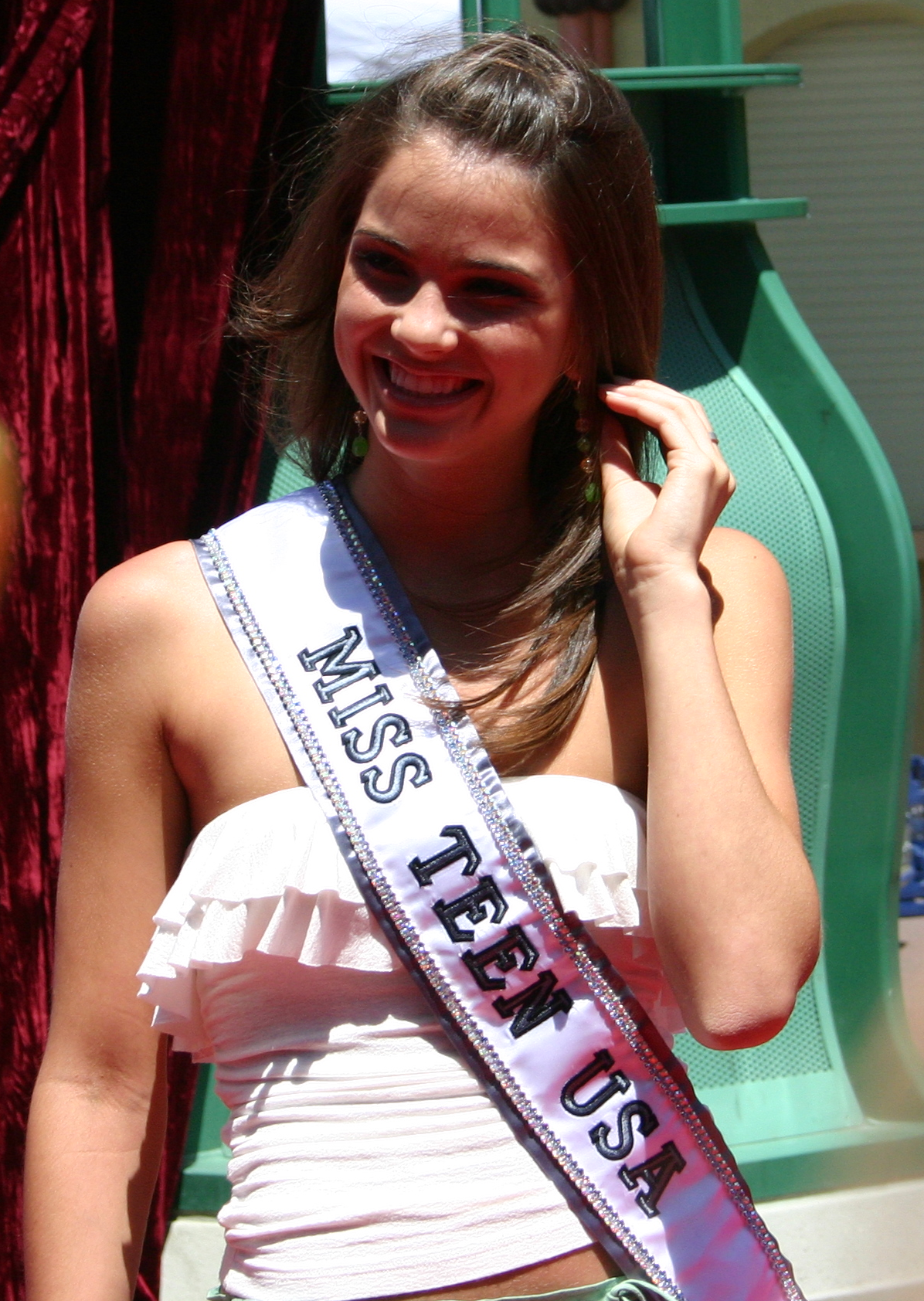
Miss Teen USA 2004
Shelley Hennig, Louisiana

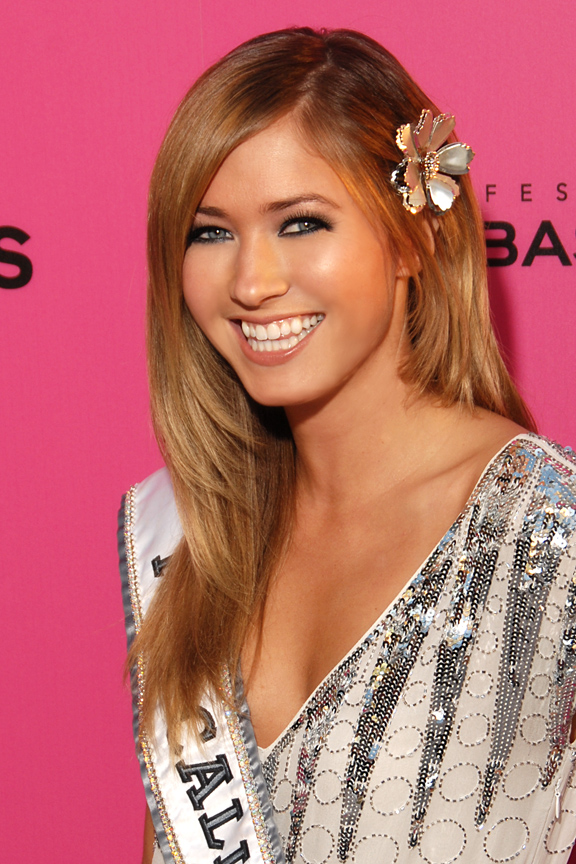
Miss Teen USA 2003
Tami Farrell, Oregon

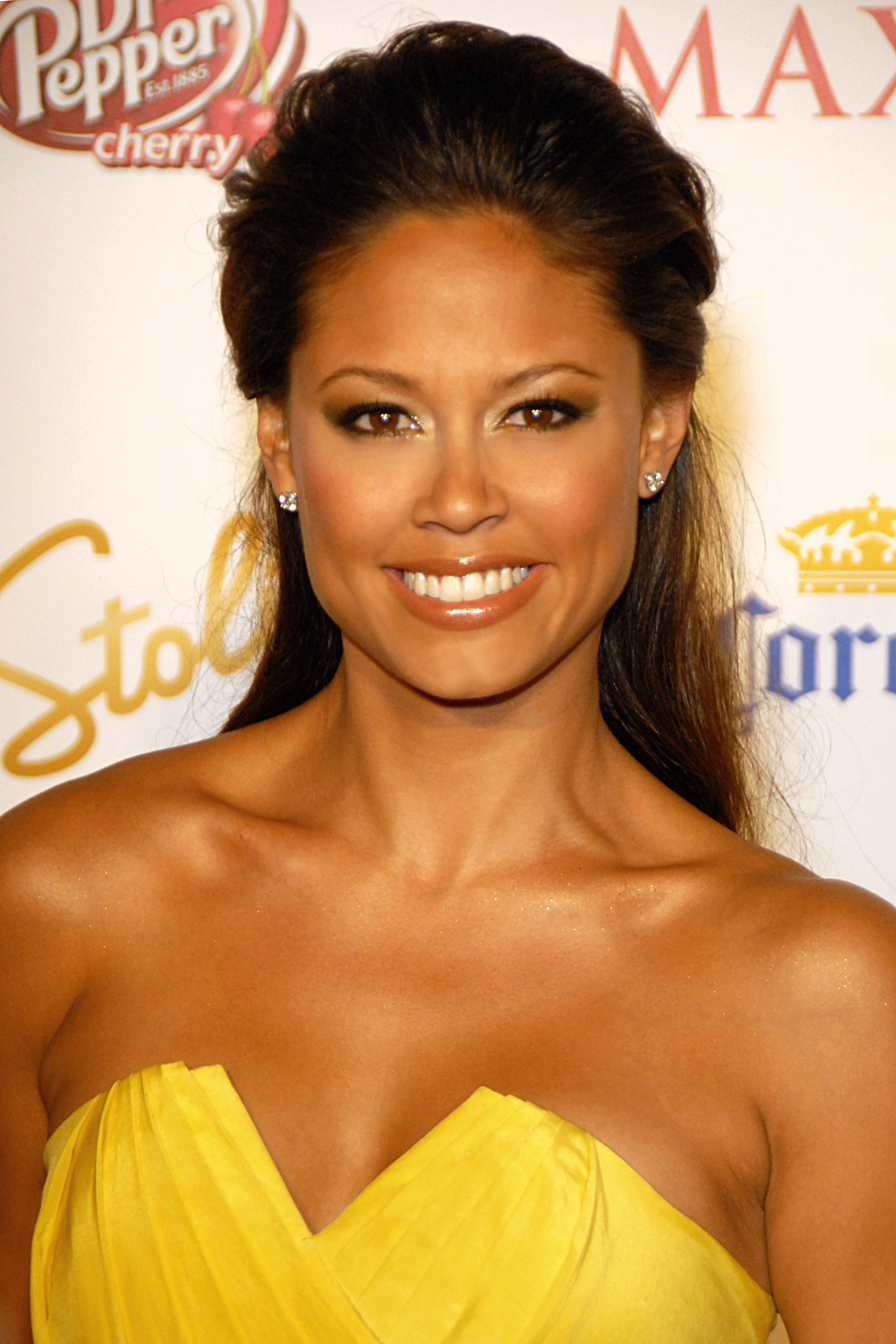
Miss Teen USA 1998
Vanessa Minnillo, South Carolina

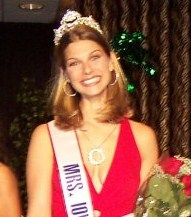
Miss Teen USA 1992
Jamie Solinger, Iowa

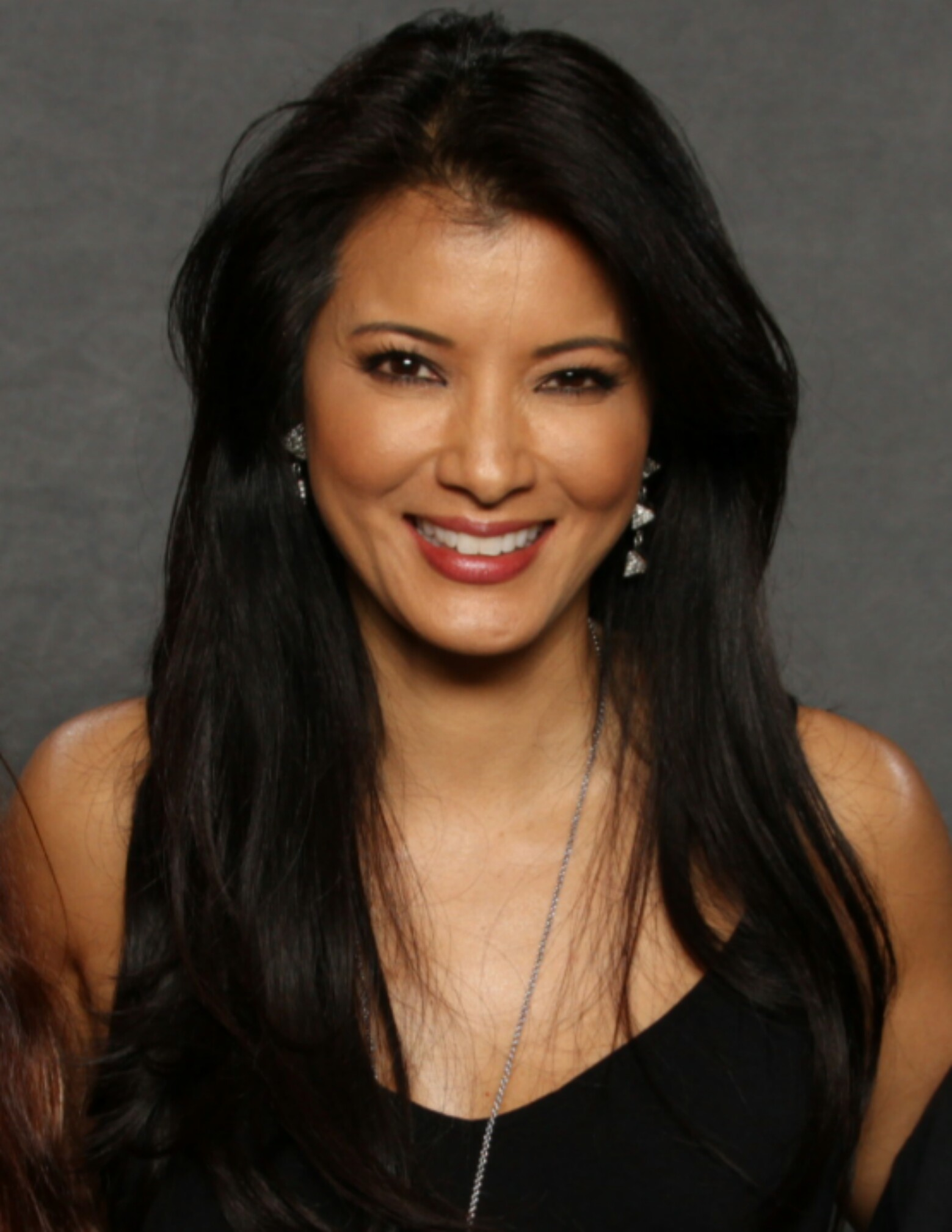
Miss Teen USA 1985
Kelly Hu, Hawaii

=== By number of wins ===
State	Number	Years
Missouri	3	2001, 2017, 2025
Texas	3	1996, 2011, 2016
Oregon	3	1988, 1990, 2003
Mississippi	2	1987, 2024
Hawaii	2	1985, 2020
Connecticut	2	2012, 2019
Kansas	2	1995, 2018
Louisiana	2	2004, 2015
South Carolina	2	1998, 2014
California	2	1994, 2013
Tennessee	2	1997, 2009
(Georgia (U.S. state)) Georgia	1	2026
New Jersey	1	2023
Nebraska	1	2022
Florida	1	2021
Maryland	1	2010
Arkansas	1	2008
Colorado	1	2007
Montana	1	2006
Ohio	1	2005
Wisconsin	1	2002
Pennsylvania	1	2000
Delaware	1	1999
Vermont	1	1993
Iowa	1	1992
New Hampshire	1	1991
Idaho	1	1989
Oklahoma	1	1986
Illinois	1	1984
(New York (state)) New York	1	1983

=== States have yet to win Miss Teen USA ===
There have been no Miss Teen USA winners from the following states:

- Alabama
- Alaska
- Arizona
- District of Columbia
- Indiana
- Kentucky
- Maine
- Massachusetts
- Michigan
- Minnesota
- Nevada
- New Mexico
- North Carolina
- North Dakota
- Rhode Island
- South Dakota
- Utah
- Virginia
- Washington
- West Virginia
- Wyoming
