= Miss Teen USA 1990 =

8th edition of the Miss Teen USA competition

- Date: July 16, 1990
- Presenters: Sandy Duncan; Kelly Hu; Leeza Gibbons
- Entertainment: Gulf Coast Teen Orchestra
- Venue: Mississippi Gulf Coast Coliseum, Biloxi, Mississippi
- Broadcaster: CBS; WHLT
- Entrants: 51
- Placements: 12
- Winner: Bridgette Wilson; Oregon
- Congeniality: Shirelle Robinson; District of Columbia
- Photogenic: Mary Ann Cimino; Maryland

Miss Teen USA 1990, the 8th Miss Teen USA pageant, was televised live from Mississippi Gulf Coast Coliseum, Biloxi, Mississippi, on July 16, 1990. At the conclusion of the final competition, Bridgette Wilson of Oregon was crowned by outgoing titleholder Brandi Sherwood of Idaho.

1990 marked the year that Oregon won the pageant for the second of three times in the history of the pageant. Oregon and Texas are the only states that have won more than two Miss Teen USA titles, Oregon: Mindy Duncan in 1988, Bridgette Wilson in 1990 and Tami Farrell in 2003. Texas: Christie Lee Woods in 1996, Danielle Doty in 2011, and Karlie Hay in 2016.

This was the first year the pageant was held at the Mississippi Gulf Coast Coliseum in Biloxi, where it would be held for the following four years.

Sandy Duncan hosted the event for the only time, with color commentary by Leeza Gibbons and Miss Teen USA 1985 Kelly Hu. Music was provided by the Gulf Coast Teen Orchestra. Duncan was the first female host of an American beauty pageant.

== Results ==
=== Placements ===
Final results	Contestant
Miss Teen USA 1990	Oregon – Bridgette Wilson
1st Runner-Up	Alaska – Marla Johnson
2nd Runner-Up	(Georgia (U.S. state)) Georgia – Holly Roehl
Top 6	Kentucky – April Vaughan; Pennsylvania – Susan Barnett; Texas – Becky Fisher
Top 12	Arizona – Jerilynn Beatty; California – Tricia Roby; Colorado – Shalon Pecosky; Louisiana – Ali Landry; Massachusetts – Nina Cammarata; Missouri – Tavia Michelle Shackles

=== Final competition ===
Nation	Preliminary Average	Interview	Swimsuit	Evening Gown	Semifinal Average
Oregon – Bridgette Wilson	7.900 (5)	9.271 (1)	8.943 (3)	9.300 (4)	9.171 (2)
Alaska – Marla Johnson	7.824 (7)	9.151 (3)	8.757 (7)	9.200 (7)	9.036 (6)
(Georgia (U.S. state)) Georgia – Holly Roehl	7.967 (4)	9.214 (2)	9.014 (2)	9.386 (2)	9.204 (1)
Texas – Becky Fisher	8.048 (2)	9.050 (5)	8.930 (4)	9.400 (1)	9.126 (3)
Kentucky – April Vaughan	7.776 (8)	9.107 (4)	8.857 (5)	9.329 (3)	9.097 (4)
Pennsylvania – Susan Barnett	8.057 (1)	8.757 (10)	9.086 (1)	9.286 (5)	9.043 (5)
Louisiana – Ali Landry	8.033 (3)	8.857 (8)	8.746 (8)	9.214 (6)	8.939 (7)
California – Tricia Roby	7.705 (10)	8.971 (6)	8.543 (10)	9.057 (8)	8.857 (8)
Missouri – Tavia Michelle Shackles	7.895 (6)	8.743 (11)	8.671 (9)	9.014 (10)	8.809 (9)
Massachusetts – Nina Cammarata	7.724 (9)	8.829 (9)	8.543 (10)	9.029 (9)	8.800 (10)
Arizona – Jerilynn Beatty	7.605 (12)	8.957 (7)	8.429 (12)	8.929 (11)	8.771 (11)
Colorado – Shalon Pecosky	7.686 (11)	8.529 (12)	8.843 (6)	8.843 (12)	8.738 (12)

=== Special awards ===
Award	Contestant
Miss Congeniality	District of Columbia – Shirelle Robinson
Miss Photogenic	Maryland – Mary Ann Cimino

== Dolphin controversy ==
In a pre-taped segment for the pageant telecast on July 2, a small group of delegates was filmed playing with dolphins in a training pool at the Marine Life Oceanarium. This led to a probe by the National Marine Fisheries Service to investigate whether the oceanarium was in violation of its permit by allowing the delegates to swim with the dolphins. It was later decided that the segment would be edited so that it only showed the delegates feeding the mammals.
