= Miss USA 1996 =

45th Miss USA pageant

- Date: February 2, 1996
- Presenters: Bob Goen; Maty Monfort
- Venue: South Padre Island, Texas
- Broadcaster: CBS, KGBT-TV
- Winner: Ali Landry; Louisiana
- Congeniality: Ku'ualoha Taylor (Hawaii)
- Photogenic: Ali Landry (Louisiana)

Miss USA 1996 was the 45th Miss USA pageant, held at South Padre Island Convention Centre on South Padre Island, Texas culminating in the final competition and crowning on February 2, 1996.

At the conclusion of the final competition, Ali Landry of Louisiana was crowned by outgoing titleholder Shanna Moakler of New York. Landry had previously won the Miss Louisiana Teen USA title and placed seventh at Miss Teen USA 1990.

The pageant was held on South Padre Island for the third and final time. It was hosted by Bob Goen for the third time, and Maty Monfort offered colour commentary. Aaron Neville provided entertainment during the competition.

This was also the first year that the Miss Universe Organization opened a website dedicated to the pageant, and the first time they instituted an internet vote to choose the winner of the Miss Photogenic award.

== Results ==
=== Placements ===
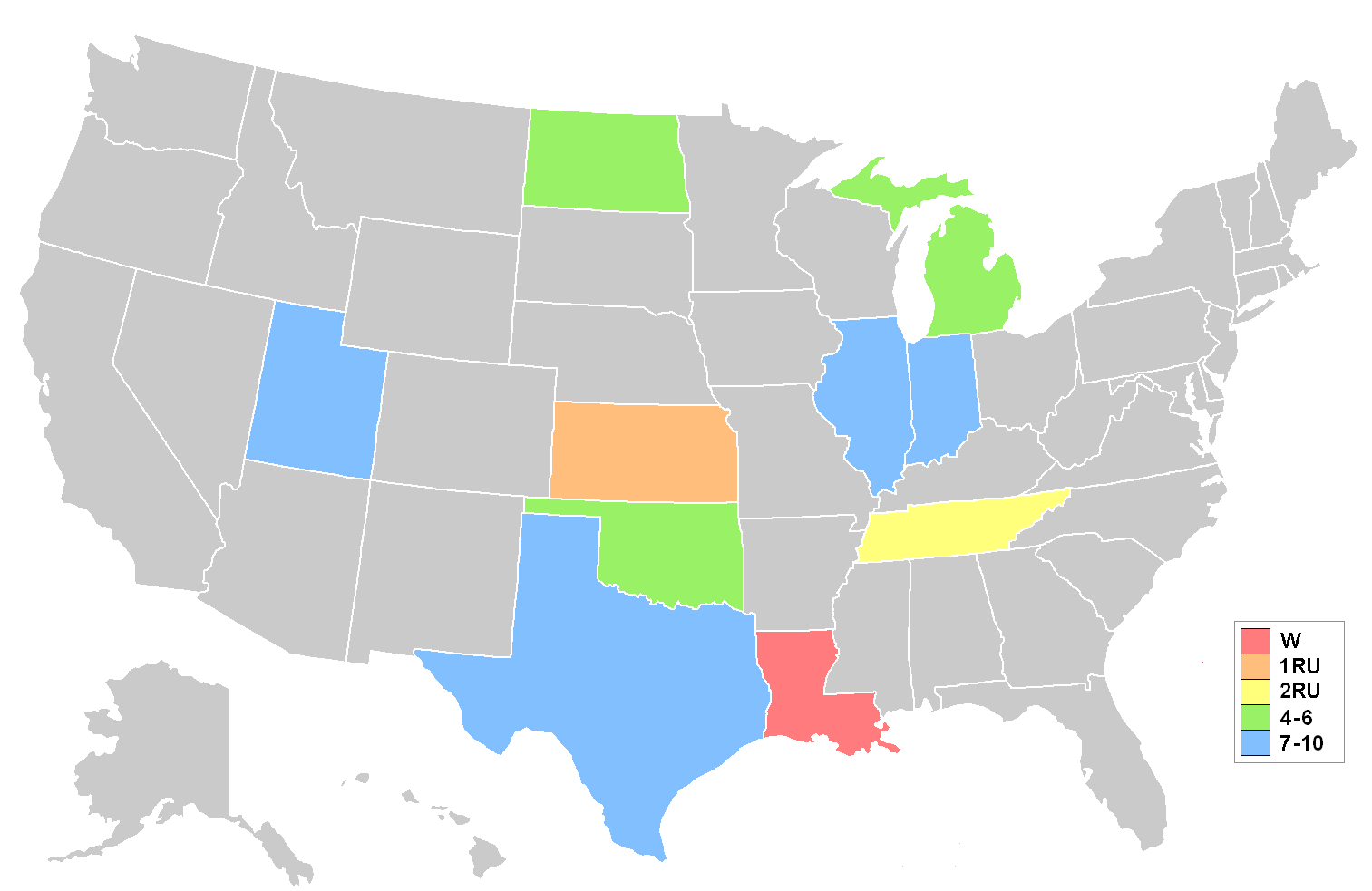
Map showing placements by state

Final results	Contestant
Miss USA 1996	Louisiana – Ali Landry
1st Runner-Up	Kansas – Danielle Boatwright
2nd Runner-Up	Tennessee – Becca Lee
Top 6	Oklahoma – Heather Crickard; Michigan – Natasha Bell; North Dakota – Juliette Spier
Top 10	Utah – Tracy Kennick; Indiana – Holly Roehl; Texas – Kara Williams; Illinois – Bernadette Przybycien

=== Special awards ===
- Miss Congeniality - Ku'ualoha Taylor (Miss Hawaii USA)
- Miss Photogenic - Ali Landry (Miss Louisiana USA)
- Finesse Style Award - Becca Lee (Miss Tennessee USA)
- Best in Swimsuit: - Danielle Boatwright (Miss Kansas USA)

== Scores ==
=== Preliminary scores ===
The following is the contestants average scores in the preliminary competition.

State	Average
Alabama	8.96
Alaska	8.35
Arizona	8.35
Arkansas	8.75
California	8.74
Colorado	8.49
Connecticut	8.97
Delaware	8.36
District of Columbia	8.96
Florida	8.88
Georgia	8.93
Hawaii	8.78
Idaho	8.52
Illinois	9.04
Indiana	9.17
Iowa	8.73
Kansas	9.47
Kentucky	8.61
Louisiana	9.18
Maine	8.51
Maryland	8.77
Massachusetts	8.86
Michigan	9.08
Minnesota	8.85
Mississippi	8.20
Missouri	8.47
Montana	8.41
Nebraska	8.85
Nevada	8.67
New Hampshire	8.44
New Jersey	8.68
New Mexico	8.84
New York	8.91
North Carolina	8.83
North Dakota	9.07
Ohio	8.56
Oklahoma	9.08
Oregon	8.78
Pennsylvania	8.93
Rhode Island	8.63
South Carolina	8.73
South Dakota	8.37
Tennessee	9.19
Texas	8.98
Utah	9.07
Vermont	8.50
Virginia	8.98
Washington	8.60
West Virginia	8.55
Wisconsin	8.55
Wyoming	8.60

Winner
First runner-up
Second runner-up
Top 6 Finalist
Top 10 Semifinalist

=== Semifinal scores ===
State	Interview	Swimsuit	Evening Gown	Average	Finals
Louisiana	9.518 (2)	9.591 (6)	9.766 (4)	9.625 (2)	9.825 (1)
Kansas	9.741 (1)	9.839 (1)	9.824 (2)	9.801 (1)	9.800 (3)
Tennessee	9.391 (9)	9.611 (5)	9.836 (1)	9.613 (3)	9.813 (2)
Oklahoma	9.419 (7)	9.501 (8)	9.776 (3)	9.565 (5)	9.668 (4)
Michigan	9.424 (6)	9.619 (4)	9.506 (10)	9.516 (6)	9.634 (5)
North Dakota	9.474 (4)	9.694 (2)	9.666 (5)	9.611 (4)	9.630 (6)
Utah	9.431 (5)	9.536 (7)	9.580 (7)	9.515 (7)	
Indiana	9.511 (3)	9.647 (3)	9.502 (8)	9.493 (8)	
Texas	9.391 (9)	9.494 (9)	9.585 (6)	9.490 (9)	
Illinois	9.405 (8)	9.450 (10)	9.536 (9)	9.464 (10)	

Winner
First runner-up
Second runner-up
Top 6 Finalist

== Delegates ==
The Miss USA 1996 delegates were:

- Alabama – Benita Brooks
- Alaska – Janelle Lynn Canady
- Arizona – Christina Novak
- Arkansas – Tiffany Parks
- California – Shauna Lyn Searles
- Colorado – Suesan Rajebi
- Connecticut – Wanda Gonzales
- Delaware – Star Behl
- District of Columbia – La Chanda Jenkins
- Florida – Idalmis Vidal
- Georgia – Jenny Craig
- Hawaii – Ku'ualoha Taylor
- Idaho – Tracy Yarbrough
- Illinois – Bernadette Przybycien
- Indiana – Holly Roehl
- Iowa – Jill Simon
- Kansas – Danielle Boatwright
- Kentucky – Lorie West
- Louisiana – Ali Landry
- Maine – Julann Vadnais
- Maryland – Michele Michael
- Massachusetts – Jacquelyn Doucette
- Michigan – Natasha Bell
- Minnesota – Karin Smith
- Mississippi – Caroline Ramagos
- Missouri – Aimee Rinehart
- Montana – Tanya Pogatchnik
- Nebraska – Kerry Lynn Kemper
- Nevada – Alisa Castillo
- New Hampshire – Julie Minta Gleneck
- New Jersey – Christina Augustyn
- New Mexico – Layla Linn
- New York – Keelin Curnuck
- North Carolina – Jessica Lee McMinn
- North Dakota – Juliette Spier
- Ohio – Melissa Boyd
- Oklahoma – Heather Crickard
- Oregon – Jill Chartier
- Pennsylvania – Susan Barnett
- Rhode Island – Karen Bradley
- South Carolina – Lysa Jackson
- South Dakota – Caresa Winters
- Tennessee – Becca Lee
- Texas – Kara Williams
- Utah – Tracy Kennick
- Vermont – Nancy Anne Roberts
- Virginia – Danielle Connors
- Washington – Staci Baldwin
- West Virginia – Regina Fisher
- Wisconsin – Mary Jo Stoker
- Wyoming – Kellee Kattleman

== Crossovers ==
Ten delegates had previously competed in either the Miss Teen USA or Miss America pageants.

Delegates who had previously held a Miss Teen USA state title were:

- Tracy Kennick (Utah) - Miss Utah Teen USA 1989
- Ali Landry (Louisiana) - Miss Louisiana Teen USA 1990 (Semi-finalist at Miss Teen USA 1990)
- Holly Roehl (Indiana) - Miss Georgia Teen USA 1990 (Second runner-up at Miss Teen USA 1990)
- Susan Barnett (Pennsylvania) - Miss Pennsylvania Teen USA 1990 (Finalist at Miss Teen USA 1990)
- Kara Williams (Texas) - Miss Texas Teen USA 1991 (Semi-finalist at Miss Teen USA 1991)
- Juliette Spier (North Dakota) - Miss North Dakota Teen USA 1992
- Danielle Boatwright (Kansas) - Miss Kansas Teen USA 1992 (Second runner-up at Miss Teen USA 1992)
- Jill Chartier (Oregon) - Miss Oregon Teen USA 1993 (Semi-finalist at Miss Teen USA 1993)
- Tiffany Parks (Arkansas) - Miss Arkansas Teen USA 1993

Delegate who had previously held a Miss America state title:

- Tracy Yarbrough (Idaho) - Miss Idaho 1994

Delegate who previously held a Miss USA state title:

- Shauna Searles (California) took over the title of Miss California USA 1992 after Shannon Marketic was crowned Miss USA 1992.

== Judges ==
- C.C.H. Pounder
- Patrick Warburton
- Debbie Fields
- Frankie Liles
- Donna Sheen
- Ricky Martin
- Jeff Feringa
- Matt Whiteside
- Irene Bedard
- Eddie Rabbitt

== See also ==
- Miss Universe 1996
- Miss Teen USA 1996
