= Susan Barnett =

American television news anchor (born 1972)

- Born: Susan Barnett; October 24, 1972 (age 53); Levittown, Pennsylvania, U.S.
- Occupation: News anchor
- Height: 1.70 m (5 ft 7 in)
- Beauty pageant titleholder
- Title: Miss Pennsylvania Teen USA 1990; Miss Pennsylvania USA 1996
- Hair color: Blonde
- Eye color: Hazel
- Major competitions: Miss Teen USA 1990 (Top 6); Miss USA 1996

Susan Barnett (born October 24, 1972) is a former American television news anchor. She spent five years at KYW-TV in Philadelphia as co-anchor of the 5, 6, and 11 P.M. newscasts and is a former beauty queen from Levittown, Pennsylvania who competed at Miss Teen USA 1990 and Miss USA 1996.

== Pageantry ==
At age 17, Barnett won the Miss Pennsylvania Teen USA title and competed in the 1990 Miss Teen USA pageant, broadcast live from Biloxi, Mississippi on July 16, 1990. She placed first in the swimsuit competition and was a Top 6 finalist in the nationally televised pageant, won by Bridgette Wilson of Oregon. In her "Parade of States" introduction, Barnett stated that after college she wished to travel the world and start a career in fashion merchandising.

Six years later, Barnett became Miss Pennsylvania USA 1996, the first former Miss Pennsylvania Teen USA to win the Miss title. She represented her state in the 1996 Miss USA pageant held in South Padre Island, Texas, obtaining the 15th highest preliminary score. The pageant was eventually won by Ali Landry of Louisiana, who had also been a semifinalist along with Barnett in Miss Teen USA 1990.

== Journalism career ==
Barnett attended Harry S. Truman High School in Levittown, Pennsylvania and graduated from the University of Delaware in 1994 with a Bachelor of Arts degree in Mass Communication with a Minor in History.

Barnett is a six time Emmy Award winning Journalist. She began her television news career in Bridgeport, West Virginia where she worked as a reporter and anchor for WDTV. Her first morning news role was for WCIA in Champaign, Illinois. She joined the staff of CBS-owned KDKA-TV in Pittsburgh in 1999 as the morning and noon co-anchor.

In 2003 she was one of a team who received the "Golden Quill" award from the Press Club of Western Pennsylvania for Best Television Public Affairs/Documentary. She then moved to Miami where she co-anchored the weekday morning newscasts at WFOR and its UPN sister station WBFS after joining the station in October 2003.

Barnett left Miami to join KYW-TV in Philadelphia on January 2, 2006. In April 2008, she became the full-time weekday evening co-anchor, replacing Alycia Lane. Barnett's contract expired at the end of March 2013 and left the station for good a month later. In 2016 and 2017, she has done television commercials for Pennsylvania-based law firm Kline and Spector.

== Personal life ==
Barnett is married to Greg Persichetti, a dermatologist and surgeon. They have two sons, and one daughter.

Barnett currently lives in Newtown Square, Pennsylvania.
