= Caroline Ford (beauty queen) =

American beauty queen

Caroline Ford is an American beauty queen from Bowling Green, Kentucky. Caroline was born on December 16 to parents Robyn & Andy. She has two sisters.

She won the title of Miss Kentucky Teen USA on January 11, 2015. Caroline won the title after her second year of competing, and she then competed for Miss Teen USA 2015 in the Bahamas at Atlantis Resort. At the age of thirteen, Caroline created the Young Artist Alliance, and she has won numerous awards for her charity work, such as the Jefferson Award. Caroline graduated from Western Kentucky University; during her time at WKU, she was a news anchor for WNKY NBC-CBS 40.
