= Miss Texas Teen USA =

Beauty pageant competition

- Formation: 1983
- Type: Beauty pageant
- Headquarters: Dallas
- Location: Texas
- Members: Miss Teen USA
- Official language: English
- Website: Official website

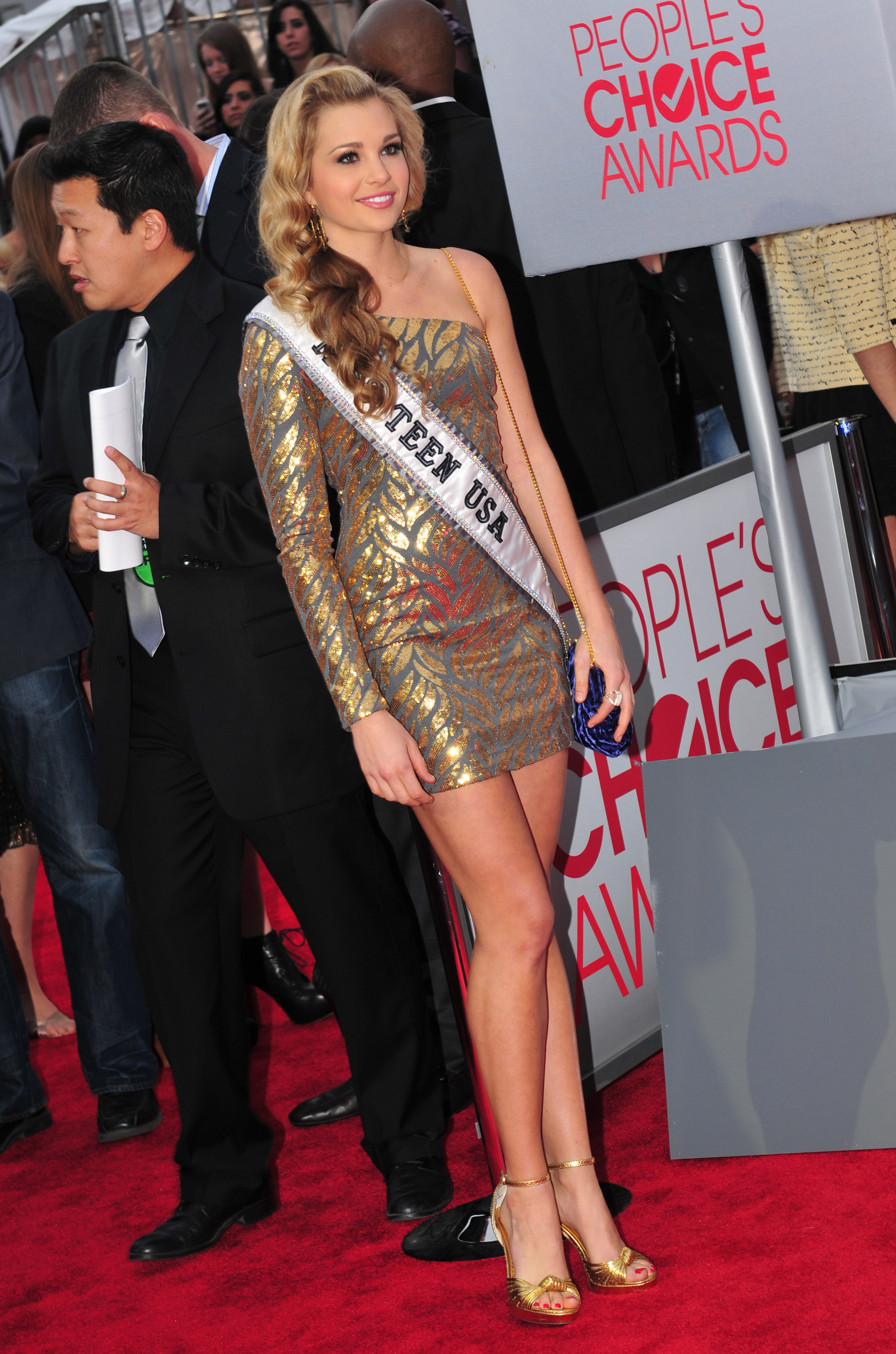
Danielle Doty, Miss Texas Teen USA & Miss Teen USA 2011

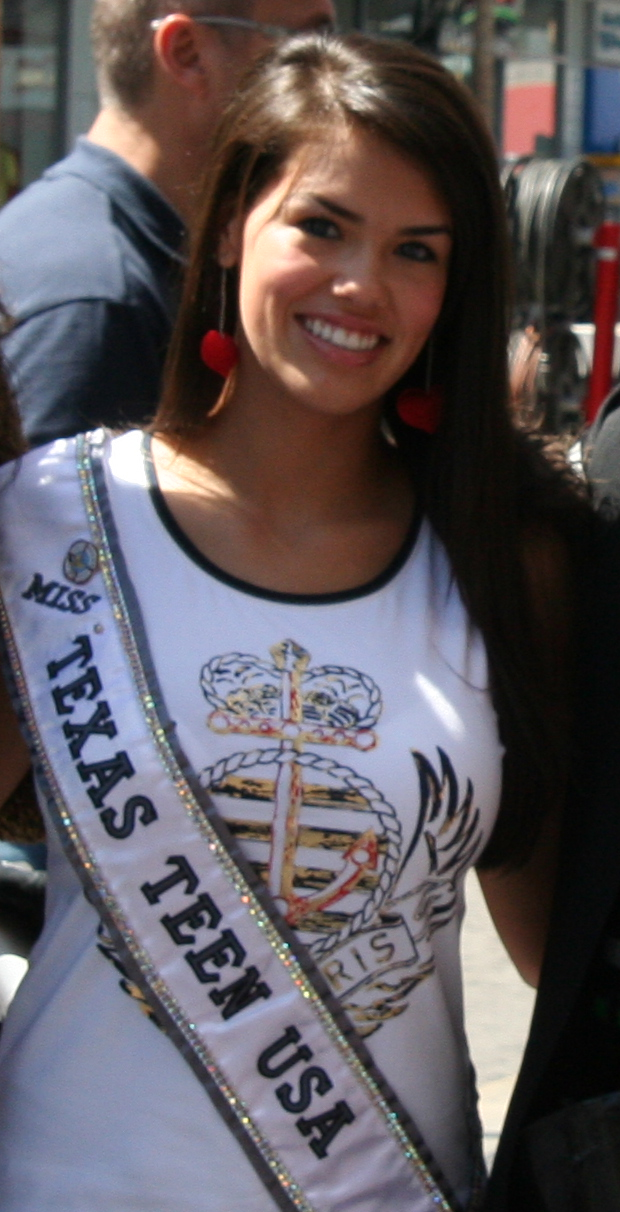
Sommer Isdale, Miss Texas Teen USA 2007

The Miss Texas Teen USA competition is the pageant that selects the representative for the state of Texas in the Miss Teen USA pageant. This pageant is part of the Miss USA organization.

Texas is in the top 5 most successful states at Miss Teen USA in terms of number and value of placements. Alongside Oregon and Missouri, they are the only three states to have produced three winners.

Chloe Bella Dietz of Tomball was appointed Miss Texas Teen USA 2026 on June 30, 2026, after the open casting call from Thomas Brodeur, the new owner of the national pageant. She will represent Texas at Miss Teen USA 2026.

== Background ==
Texas's best performance came in the 1980s, where they placed in all but one year and were runners-up on five occasions. Despite this, they still placed second to New York in that decade in terms of number and value of placements. Despite being on top overall, Texas has never been the best state in any particular decade.

Texas is one of the most successful states across all thirty-seven years of competition at Miss Teen USA. They have had seventeen semi-finalists, three more than any other state. They have won the crown three times (along with Oregon), in 1996 when Christie Lee Woods took the title (Woods later went on to star in The Amazing Race 5 and The Amazing Race 31) and 15 years later in 2011 when Danielle Doty won. Karlie Hay became the third Texan entrant to win the crown in 2016. Texas and the state of Oregon are the only states to have won Miss Teen USA three times. Texas has also won several awards, including Miss Photogenic in 2010.

While a number of Texas teens have competed for the Miss Texas USA title, only six have won both pageants. The most successful of these was Nicole O'Brian, who placed 1st runner-up at Miss Teen USA and 2nd runner-up at Miss USA. O'Brien also competed alongside Woods on The Amazing Race 5. Woods was the first Miss Teen USA to not win a Miss title on her first attempt, and despite competing in a number of years never won the Miss Texas USA crown.

== Results summary ==
=== Placements ===
- Miss Teen USAs: Christie Lee Woods (1996), Danielle Doty (2011), Karlie Hay (2016)
- 1st runners-up: Rebecca "Becky" Pestana (1986), Nicole O'Brian (2000)
- 2nd runner-up: Landry Davis (2021)
- 3rd runners-up: Konae Wehle (1985), Kristi Wright (1989), Katherine Perello (2001), Haylee Elyse Puckett (2023)
- 4th runners-up: Sheri Scholz (1983), Charlene Molinar (1984), Chloe Bella Dietz (2026)
- Top 6: Becky Fisher (1990)
- Top 10: Libby Pelton (1988), Christie Cole (1998), Misty Giles (1999), Laika Kalyani Patel (2025)
- Top 12: Kara Williams (1991)
- Top 15: Tye Felan (2003), Magen Ellis (2004), Kellie Stewart (2014), Chloe Kembel (2015), Kirby Lindley (2017)
- Top 20: Dallyn Pesek (2024)

Texas holds a record of 25 placements at Miss Teen USA.

=== Awards ===
- Style Award: Andria Mullins (1997)
- Swimsuit award: Nicole O'Brian (2000), Katherine Perello (2001)
- Miss Photogenic: Chelsea Morgensen (2010)

== Winners ==
- Declared as Winner
- Ended as runner-up
- Ended as one of the finalists or semifinalists

Year	Name	Hometown	Age^{1}	Local Title	Placement at Miss Teen USA	Special awards at Miss Teen USA	Notes
2026	Chloe Bella Dietz	Tomball	18	Miss Tomball Teen	4th runner-up		Previously Miss Texas High School America 2025; 2nd runner-up at Miss High School America 2025
2025	Laika Kayani Patel	Austin	17	Miss Austin Teen	Top 10		
2024	Dallyn Pesek	Shiner	17	Miss Houston Teen	Top 20		
2023	Haylee Elyse Puckett	Houston	16	Miss Space City Teen	3rd runner-up		
2022	Chanel Williams	San Antonio	15	Miss Alamo Teen			
2021	Landry Davis	Dallas	18	Miss Metroplex Teen	2nd runner-up		
2020	Anissa Mendez	Laredo	17	Miss North Laredo Teen			Longest reigning Miss Texas Teen USA (1 year, 5 months, and 29 days) due to the COVID-19 pandemic
2019	Kennedy Edwards	Houston	17	Miss Houston Teen			First African American Miss Texas Teen USA
2018	Brenna Flynn	Fort Worth	18	Miss Fort Worth Teen			
2017	Kirby Lindley	Cypress	18	Miss Dallas Teen	Top 15		
2016	Karlie Hay	Tomball	18	Miss Kemah Teen	Miss Teen USA 2016		
2015	Chloe Kembel	Denton	18	Miss North Central TX Teen	Top 15		
2014	Kellie Stewart	Fort Worth	16	Miss Dallas Teen	Top 15		
2013	Daniella Rodriguez	Laredo	16	Miss Central Laredo Teen			Later Miss Texas USA 2016
2012	Madison Lee	Houston	18	Miss Bay Area Teen			
2011	Danielle Doty	Harlingen	18	Miss Harlingen Teen	Miss Teen USA 2011		
2010	Chelsea Morgensen	Laredo	15	Miss Laredo Teen		Miss Photogenic	Later Miss Hooters International 2017
2009	Kelli Harral	Fort Stockton	16	Miss Fort Stockton Teen			Later NFL Houston Texans Cheerleader May 2011-June 2014
2008	Lauren Guzman	Laredo	18	Miss Laredo Teen			Later Miss Texas USA 2014
2007	Sommer Isdale	Harker Heights	16	Miss Waco Teen			
2006	Raevan Valadez	Spicewood	18	Miss Austin Teen			
2005	April Ford	Texarkana	18				
2004	Magen Ellis	Whitehouse	17	Miss Tyler Teen	Semi-finalist		Later Miss Texas USA 2007; Top 10 at Miss USA 2007
2003	Tye Felan	Tomball	18	Miss Houston Teen	Semi-finalist		
2002	Brittany Tiner	Freeport	16	Miss Rice Belt Teen			
2001	Katherine Perello	Lake Jackson	16		3rd runner-up	Body Glove Swimsuit Award	
2000	Nicole O'Brian	Friendswood	17	Miss Bay Area Teen	1st runner-up	Swimsuit Award	Later Miss Texas USA 2003; 2nd runner up at Miss USA 2003; Contestant on The Amazing Race 5
1999	Misty Giles	Killeen	18		Semi-finalist		Contestant on Survivor: Panama
1998	Christie Cole	Houston	16		Semi-finalist		
1997	Andria Gayle Mullins	Waco	16	Miss Lake Whitney Teen		Style award	Contestant on The Starlet
1996	Christie Lee Woods	Huntsville	18		Miss Teen USA 1996		Two-time contestant on The Amazing Race (seasons 5 and 31)
1995	Mandy Jeffreys	Midland	17				Appeared on The Bachelor
1994	Jaqueline Pena	Corpus Christi	18				
1993	Erin Burnett	Plano	16				
1992	Carissa Blair	Columbus	17				Later Miss Texas USA 1999
1991	Kara Williams	Houston	18		Semi-finalist		Later Miss Texas USA 1996, Semifinalist at Miss USA 1996
1990	Becky Fisher	Cypress	17		Top 6		
1989	Kristi Wright	Del Rio	16		3rd runner-up		
1988	Libby Denise Pelton	Austin	18		Semi-finalist		
1987	Richelle Geneva Marie Kesling	Spring	15				
1986	Becky Elizabeth Pestana	San Antonio	17	Miss Bexar County Teen	1st runner-up		
1985	Konae Sabrina Wehle	Humble	16		3rd runner-up		
1984	Charlene Shawn Molinar	El Paso	18		4th runner-up		
1983	Sheri Kay Scholz	Lubbock	17		4th runner-up		

^{1} Age at the time of the Miss Teen USA pageant
