= Danielle Doty =

American beauty queen (born 1993)

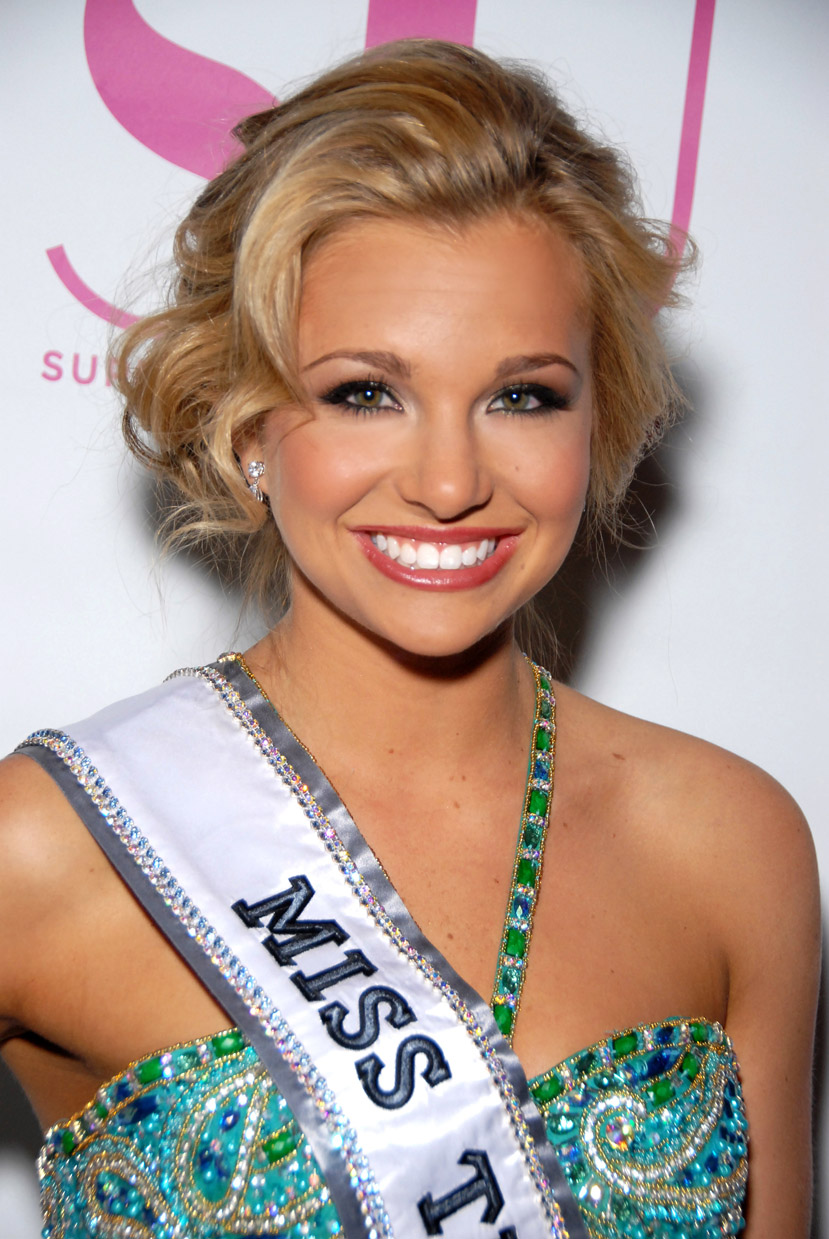
- Doty in 2012
- Born: April 27, 1993 (age 33)
- Beauty pageant titleholder
- Title: Miss Texas Teen USA 2011; Miss Teen USA 2011
- Hair color: Blonde
- Eye color: Brown
- Major competitions: Miss Teen USA 2011 (Winner)

Danielle Doty (April 27, 1993) is an American model and beauty queen who was crowned Miss Teen USA 2011.

== Career ==
Doty first started her pageant career in the National American Miss system where she won the title of Miss Texas in several age divisions. Doty won the Miss Texas Teen USA title on November 28, 2010, the first state titleholder from the Rio Grande Valley. She represented Texas; her win was Texas' second, following that of Christie Lee Woods in 1996.

As of 2011, she attended Texas Christian University and is a member of Delta Delta Delta sorority.

Doty served as a finals judge at the Miss USA 2015 pageant on July 12, 2015, in Baton Rouge, Louisiana.

== Personal life ==
On December 23, 2018, Doty announced that she was engaged to her long-term boyfriend, Dylan Fitzgerald.

In January 2019, she announced on her Instagram that she had melanoma, a form of skin cancer.

Awards and achievements
Preceded by (Maryland) Kamie Crawford	Miss Teen USA; 2011	Succeeded by (Connecticut) Logan West
Preceded by Chelsea Morgensen	Miss Texas Teen USA; 2011	Succeeded by Madison Lee
