= Ali Landry =

American actress

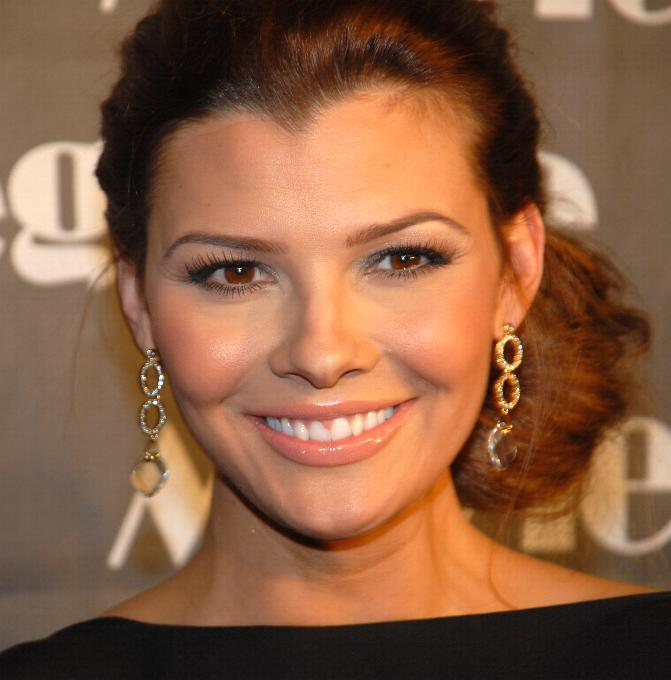
- Landry in 2008
- Born: Ali Germaine Landry; July 21, 1973 (age 53); Breaux Bridge, Louisiana, U.S.
- Spouses: Mario Lopez (m. 2004; ann. 2004) Alejandro Gómez Monteverde (m. 2006)
- Children: 3
- Beauty pageant titleholder
- Title: Miss Louisiana Teen USA 1990; Miss Louisiana USA 1996; Miss USA 1996
- Years active: 1997–present
- Major competitions: Miss Louisiana Teen USA 1990; (Winner); Miss Teen USA 1990; (Top 12); Miss Louisiana USA 1996; (Winner); Miss USA 1996; (Winner); Miss Universe 1996; (Top 6)

Ali Germaine Landry (born July 21, 1973) is an American actress, model and beauty pageant titleholder who won Miss USA 1996. She played Rita Lefleur on the UPN sitcom Eve and was the Doritos Girl in a 1998 Super Bowl commercial. In 1998, she was named by People magazine as one of 50 most beautiful people in the world.

== Early life ==
Landry was named after Ali MacGraw after her mother had seen the 1970 film Love Story. Landry grew up in the Crawfish Capital of the World, Breaux Bridge, Louisiana. She is the daughter of Renella (Ray) and Gene Allen Landry. Landry is of French (Acadian/Cajun) descent. She attended Cecilia High School, graduating in 1991. In high school, she was captain of the cheerleaders. She attended the University of Southwestern Louisiana, now University of Louisiana at Lafayette, and majored in mass communication. She is a member of Kappa Delta sorority.

== Pageantry ==
Her first foray into pageantry came in 1990 when she was crowned Miss Louisiana Teen USA. She represented Louisiana in the 1990 Miss Teen USA pageant held in Biloxi, Mississippi in July 1990, where she placed first in the preliminary swimsuit and evening gown competitions, but was ranked seventh during the final competition.

In 1995, Landry won the 1996 Miss Louisiana USA title, becoming the first former Miss Louisiana Teen USA to win Miss Louisiana USA. She went on to compete in the 1996 Miss USA pageant, which was broadcast live from South Padre Island, Texas in February 1996 – she placed third highest after the preliminary competition and second highest on average during the final Top 10 competition. She was the highest placed of the Top 6 finalists and eventually went on to win the 1996 title.

She is the first former Miss Teen USA delegate to win the Miss USA crown outright (her predecessor Shanna Moakler, previously Miss Rhode Island Teen USA, Miss New York USA and first runner-up to Miss USA Chelsi Smith, only inherited the title after Smith became Miss Universe).

Landry competed in the 1996 Miss Universe pageant held in Las Vegas in May that year. Her national costume was inspired by Mardi Gras. She placed first in the preliminary competition and was ranked second in the evening gown and interview events during the final competition. She was second going into the next round of six delegates, but she was eliminated after the judges' questions.

Until 1999, Landry was the only former Miss Teen USA delegate to compete at Miss Universe. Her record at all three pageants was not surpassed until 2000 when Miss USA 2000, Lynnette Cole made the top 5 at all three pageants.

== Post-pageants ==
Landry has done much modeling for photographers and magazines. As a spokeswoman for the Doritos chips brand, she appeared in celebrated TV commercials airing during the 1998, 1999 and 2000 Super Bowl football games. She was named by People magazine as one of the 50 most beautiful people in the world in 1998. Her house was featured on E!'s celebrity homes and on MTV's Cribs. She has been listed as one of FHM magazine's 100 Sexiest Women in the World numerous times. She was twice named on Stuff Magazine's 100 Sexiest Women list. Askmen.com has named her one of the 50 Most Beautiful Women and 99 Most Desirable Women in the World.

In 2002, she hosted the second season of the hidden-camera series Spy TV. From 2003 to 2006, she was a regular cast member of the UPN sitcom Eve.

Landry has participated in the show Fear Factor and was runner-up. She is an avid athlete and also participated in the Boston Marathon.

She has hosted the English and Spanish-language versions of Spotlight to Nightlight, an interview show on Yahoo! where she talks with celebrity mothers about parenting issues. She also launched a lifestyle line, Belle Parish in 2009. Belle Parish launched with a children's clothing line in September 2009, to be in stores spring 2010. The line is inspired by her Southern upbringing and the keepsake items her mother saved from her childhood.

Landry starred in (and was the executive producer of) TV Guide Network's show, Hollywood Moms' Club, in November 2011. For the year 2012 she was the new face and spokesmodel of Palmer's Cocoa Butter Formula, following in the footsteps of celeb moms Samantha Harris and Laila Ali who previously posed for Palmer's.

== Personal life ==
Landry met actor and TV personality Mario Lopez when he presented the Miss Teen USA 1998 pageant and she was a commentator. They were engaged during the summer of 2003 and married on April 24, 2004, in a Catholic ceremony in front of 50 guests at the exclusive Las Alamandas resort outside Puerto Vallarta, Mexico. Two weeks later, she had the marriage annulled after learning that Lopez was unfaithful during his bachelor party before the wedding.

She married film director Alejandro Gómez Monteverde on April 8, 2006, in San Miguel de Allende, Mexico. They have three children: a daughter born in July 2007, and sons born in October 2011 and July 2013. Their son Valentin's middle name was inspired by Pope Francis, as Landry and Monteverde met him while she was pregnant and he blessed the baby.

Her father-in-law, Juan Manuel Gómez Fernández, and brother-in-law, Juan Manuel Gómez Monteverde, were found dead with fatal head wounds in Pueblo Viejo, in the Mexican state of Veracruz, on September 19, 2015, approximately two weeks after they were kidnapped from their home in nearby Tamaulipas. On November 9, 2015, six people were arrested for the kidnapping and murder of Gómez Fernández and Gómez Monteverde. The suspects were allegedly holding six Central American nationals hostage at the time of their arrest, according to the Chief of the Mexican Federal Police.

== Filmography ==
Landry and her husband Alejandro Monteverde made the film Bella together. Bella was directed by Monteverde and was produced by their business partners Sean Wolfington, Eduardo Verástegui, Leo Severino, and Denise Pinckley. Monteverde and the filmmakers received honors for Bella from the Toronto Film Festival, the Smithsonian and the White House. The Smithsonian Latino Center honored Monteverde with their "Legacy Award". Monteverde was also given the "Outstanding American by Choice" award for Bella's positive contribution to Latino art and culture in the U.S.

US President George W. Bush and First Lady Laura Bush saw the film and invited Monteverde to sit with Laura Bush in her private box during the annual State of the Union speech in 2007.

Film
Year	Title	Role	Notes
2000	Beautiful	Belindy Lindbrook	
2001	Soulkeeper	Red Head	
2002	Repli-Kate	Kate / Repli-Kate	
2002	Outta Time	Bella	
2002	Who's Your Daddy?	Elissa Bauer	Video
2006	Bella	Celia	
2011	Me Again	April	
2011	Crescendo I	Teacher	Short film
2015	Little Boy	Ava	
2023	Sound of Freedom	Nurse	

Television
Year	Title	Role	Notes
1997	Clueless	Masseuse #1	Episode: "Sharing Cher"
1997	Sunset Beach	Kenzie	3 episodes; uncredited
1997	Conan the Adventurer	Raina	Episode: "The Ruby Fruit Forest"
1998	Prime Time Comedy	Host	TV movie
1998	The Bold and the Beautiful	Amur	Episode: "1.2730"
1998	Significant Others	Gorgeous Woman	Episode: "Pilot"
1998	America’s Greatest Pets	Co-host	2 episodes
1998–2000	Pensacola: Wings of Gold	Teri	9 episodes
1999	Popular	Heather	Episode: "Mo' Menace, Mo' Problems"
1999	Malcolm & Eddie	Kellie Bradford	Episode: "Won't Power"
1999	Miss Universe 1999	Host/Color Commentator	
2000	Two Guys and a Girl	Girl at Laundromat	Episode: "Bridesmaid Revisited"
2000	Felicity	Natalie	4 episodes
2001	Farmclub.com	Host	TV series
2001	Inside Schwartz	Anne	Episode: "Event Night"
2002	Spy TV	Herself / Hostess	8 episodes
2003	Fastlane	Hillary	Episode: "Dosed"; Episode: "Iced"
2003–2006	Eve	Rita Lefleur	66 episodes
2008	Criminal Minds	Kaylee Robinson	Episode: "Masterpiece"
2008	TruTV Presents World's Dumbest	Herself, panelist	Episode: "World's Dumbest Drivers 4"
2011, 2020–22	The Real Housewives of Beverly Hills	Herself	5 episodes
2016	Miss USA 2016	Herself	Telecast Judge
2016–2017	Hollywood Today Live	Various / Co-hostess	150 episodes
2018	Kevin Can Wait	Lisa	Episode: "Flight or Fight"
2019	Chic Mama Drama	Ali	Episode: "Behind-The-Scenes"

Awards and achievements
Preceded by Elizabeth Coxe	Miss Louisiana USA; 1996	Succeeded by Nikole Viola
Preceded by Shanna Moakler	Miss USA; 1996	Succeeded by Brook Lee
Media offices
Preceded by William Shatner	Miss USA host (with Deion Sanders); 2002	Succeeded by Billy Bush and Daisy Fuentes
Preceded by Marla Maples	Miss Universe color commentator (with Julie Moran); 1998–2000	Succeeded by Todd Newton and Brook Lee
Preceded by Marla Maples	Miss USA color commentator (with Julie Moran); 1998–2000	Succeeded by Tommy Davidson, Vanessa Minnillo and Lara Dutta
Preceded by Ivanka Trump	Miss Teen USA color commentator (with Julie Moran); 1998–2000	Succeeded by Ashley Coleman
Preceded by Michael Ian Black (Season 1)	Spy TV host Season 2 (2002)	Succeeded by series cancelled
