= Miss Teen USA 2016 =

34th edition of the Miss Teen USA competition

- Promotional banner featuring Katherine Haik
- Date: July 30, 2016
- Presenters: Cody Johns; Olivia Jordan
- Entertainment: Nick Fradiani
- Venue: The Venetian Theatre, Las Vegas, Nevada
- Broadcaster: Xbox Live (Note: Available in Argentina, Australia, Brazil, Canada, Chile, Colombia, France, Germany, Ireland, Italy, Mexico, New Zealand, Portugal, Russia, South Africa, Spain, United Arab Emirates, United Kingdom and United States); YouTube; Facebook
- Entrants: 51
- Placements: 15
- Winner: Karlie Hay; Texas

Miss Teen USA 2016 was the 34th Miss Teen USA pageant, was held at The Venetian Theatre in Las Vegas, Nevada on July 30, 2016. The pageant was webcast on the Miss Universe website, Facebook page, and mobile app as well as on Xbox 360 and Xbox One consoles via Xbox Live. It was hosted by Miss USA 2015 Olivia Jordan and social media star Cody Johns, while American Idol winner Nick Fradiani performed. This is the first time that the state of Nevada hosted the pageant and the first Miss Teen USA pageant held in the United States since 2007.

This was the first edition of the Miss Teen USA pageant to be held under the ownership of WME/IMG, which purchased the Miss Universe Organization from Donald Trump on September 14, 2015.

Since this year, the swimsuit competition has been replaced by the sportswear competition.

== Results ==
Placement	Name
Miss Teen USA 2016	Texas – Karlie Hay
1st Runner-Up	North Carolina – Emily Wakeman
2nd Runner-Up	South Carolina - Marley Stokes
3rd Runner-Up	Alabama - Erin Snow
4th Runner-Up	Nevada - Carissa Morrow
Top 15	California - Athenna Crosby; South Dakota - Makenzie Falcon; Delaware - Emily Hutchison; Georgia - Bentley Wright; Illinois - Olivia Pura; Louisiana - Ellie Picone; Missouri - Dallas Ezard; Ohio - Olivia Turk; Tennessee - Savannah Chrisley; Vermont - Tammy Vujanovic

== Pageant ==
=== Selection of contestants ===
One delegate from each state and the District of Columbia were chosen in state pageants held from September 2015 to January 2016.

=== Competition rounds ===
For the first time, the swimsuit competition did not take place and was replaced with an athletic wear competition. Tapout, in collaboration with clothing designer Goldsheep, designed the athletic wear outfits for the pageant, with each individual outfit based on the delegates' representative states.

=== Preliminary round ===
Prior to the final competition, the delegates competed in the preliminary competition, which involves private interviews with the judges and a presentation show where they compete in athletic wear and evening gown. It was held on July 29, 2016, and was broadcast on the Miss Universe website and mobile app.

=== Finals ===
During the final competition, the top fifteen competed in athletic wear and evening gown. The top five also competed in a customized final question round, and the winner was decided by a panel of judges.

== Judges ==
The judges for the pageant were:

- Natalie Eva Marie – WWE wrestler
- Hilary Cruz – Miss Teen USA 2007 from Colorado
- Keylee Sue Sanders – Miss Teen USA 1995 from Kansas
- Lu Parker – Miss USA 1994 from South Carolina
- Savannah Keyes – Singer

== Contestants ==
51 delegates have been confirmed:

State or district	Name	Age (Note: Ages are at the time of the pageant)	Height	Hometown	Placement	Notes
Alabama	Erin Snow	18	5 ft 6 in (168 cm)	Gadsden	3rd runner-up	Later 3rd runner-up at Miss Alabama USA 2020; Later 1st runner-up at Miss Georgia USA 2021
Alaska	Nneamaka Isolokwu	18	5 ft 8 in (173 cm)	Anchorage		
Arizona	Tristany Hightower	17	5 ft 9 in (175 cm)	Scottsdale		
Arkansas	Makenzie Sexton	18	5 ft 6 in (168 cm)	Cabot		
California	Athenna Crosby	18	5 ft 7 in (170 cm)	San Jose	Top 15	Later top 12 semifinalist at Miss Utah USA 2019 & 4th runner-up at Miss California USA 2022
Colorado	Alexis Wynne	18	5 ft 8 in (173 cm)	Castle Pines		
Connecticut	Katy Brown	19	5 ft 8 in (173 cm)	Hebron		
Delaware	Emily Hutchison	18	5 ft 11 in (180 cm)	Wilmington	Top 15	
District of Columbia	Dylan Murphy	18	5 ft 7 in (170 cm)	Georgetown		
Florida	Gracie Smith	17	5 ft 11 in (180 cm)	Ponce Inlet		
Georgia	Bentley Wright	17	5 ft 8 in (173 cm)	Vidalia	Top 15	
Hawaii	Joahnnalee Ucol	16	5 ft 4 in (163 cm)	Kahului		
Idaho	Kate Pekuri	18	5 ft 9 in (175 cm)	Boise		Later 1st runner-up at Miss Utah USA 2019
Illinois	Olivia Pura	18	5 ft 10 in (178 cm)	Deer Park	Top 15	Later Miss Illinois USA 2020 & Top 10 at Miss USA 2020
Indiana	Lauren Boswell	18	5 ft 10 in (178 cm)	Fisher		
Iowa	Hannah Bockhaus	18	5 ft 7 in (170 cm)	Tripoli		
Kansas	Madison Moore	17	5 ft 11 in (180 cm)	Olathe		
Kentucky	Christiaan Prince	15	5 ft 10 in (178 cm)	Grayson		
Louisiana	Ellie Picone	16	5 ft 11 in (180 cm)	Covington	Top 15	
Maine	Jessica Stewart	18	5 ft 8 in (173 cm)	Unity		
Maryland	Amy Ingram	19	5 ft 9 in (175 cm)	Germantown		
Massachusetts	Alexis Frasca	17	5 ft 6 in (168 cm)	Franklin		
Michigan	Unjaneé Wells	18	5 ft 6 in (168 cm)	Ypsilanti		Later 4th runner-up at Miss Michigan USA 2019
Minnesota	Sophia Primozich	17	5 ft 4 in (163 cm)	Minnetonka		
Mississippi	Lauren Rymer	18	6 ft 1 in (185 cm)	Natchez		
Missouri	Dallas Ezard	19	5 ft 8 in (173 cm)	Camdenton	Top 15	
Montana	Jami Forseth	19	5 ft 11 in (180 cm)	Huntley		Later Miss Montana USA 2021
Nebraska	Erika Etzelmiller	18	5 ft 6 in (168 cm)	Lincoln		Later Miss Nebraska USA 2021 & Top 16 at Miss USA 2021
Nevada	Carissa Morrow	17	5 ft 6 in (168 cm)	Henderson	4th runner-up	
New Hampshire	Valeria Podobniy	18	5 ft 7 in (170 cm)	Amherst		
New Jersey	Gina Mellish	17	5 ft 9 in (175 cm)	Oceanport		Later Miss New Jersey USA 2020 & Top 10 at Miss USA 2020
New Mexico	Margeaux Greene	16	5 ft 6 in (168 cm)	Sandia Park		Later 2nd runner-up at Miss New Mexico USA 2020
New York	Natalia Terrero	17	5 ft 4 in (163 cm)	Commack		
North Carolina	Emily Wakeman	19	5 ft 4 in (163 cm)	Cornelius	1st runner-up	Later 1st runner-up at Miss South Carolina USA 2021 & 4th runner-up at Miss South Carolina 2021
North Dakota	Paige Mathison	17	5 ft 4 in (163 cm)	Fargo		
Ohio	Olivia Turk	18	5 ft 8 in (173 cm)	Dublin	Top 15	
Oklahoma	Hellen Smith	17	5 ft 8 in (173 cm)	Oklahoma City		
Oregon	Mikaela Bruer	17	5 ft 11 in (180 cm)	Dallas		
Pennsylvania	Sydney Dolanch	18	5 ft 5 in (165 cm)	Pittsburgh		
Rhode Island	Malia Cruz	19	5 ft 6 in (168 cm)	Warwick		
South Carolina	Marley Stokes	19	5 ft 8 in (173 cm)	Lexington	2nd runner-up	Later Miss South Carolina USA 2021 & Top 8 at Miss USA 2021
South Dakota	Makenzie Falcon	18	5 ft 6 in (168 cm)	Aberdeen	Top 15	Later 2nd runner-up at Miss South Dakota USA 2018
Tennessee	Savannah Chrisley	18	5 ft 8 in (173 cm)	Nashville	Top 15	Stars in Chrisley Knows Best
Texas	Karlie Hay	18	5 ft 7 in (170 cm)	Tomball	Miss Teen USA 2016	
Utah	AbbyJade Larson	17	5 ft 3 in (160 cm)	North Logan		
Vermont	Tammy Vujanovic	16	5 ft 8 in (173 cm)	Burlington	Top 15	
Virginia	Gracyn Blackmore	16	5 ft 8 in (173 cm)	Bristol		
Washington	Claire Wright	18	5 ft 6 in (168 cm)	Fall City		
West Virginia	Cassy Trickett	18	5 ft 0 in (152 cm)	St. Marys		
Wisconsin	Karly Knaus	18	5 ft 9 in (175 cm)	Plymouth		Later 2nd runner-up at Miss Wisconsin USA 2020; Later 3rd runner-up at Miss Wisconsin USA 2021
Wyoming	Shelly McRoberts	18	5 ft 9 in (175 cm)	Kemmerer		
