= Miss Teen USA 2015 =

33rd edition of the Miss Teen USA competition

- Promotional banner for Miss Teen USA 2015 featuring K. Lee Graham and the Royal Towers
- Date: August 22, 2015
- Presenters: Erin Brady; Nick Teplitz
- Venue: Grand Ballroom, Atlantis Paradise Island, Nassau, The Bahamas
- Broadcaster: Xbox Live; YouTube
- Entrants: 51
- Placements: 15
- Winner: Katherine Haik; Louisiana
- Congeniality: Cora King; West Virginia
- Photogenic: Christina Stratton; Missouri

Miss Teen USA 2015 was the 33rd Miss Teen USA pageant. It was held at the Atlantis Paradise Island in Nassau, The Bahamas on August 22, 2015, and was hosted by Miss USA 2013 Erin Brady and television writer Nick Teplitz. All fifty states and District of Columbia competed. K. Lee Graham of South Carolina crowned her successor Katherine Haik of Louisiana at the end of the event.

== Pageant ==
=== Selection of contestants ===
One delegate from each state and the District of Columbia will be chosen in state pageants held from September 2014 to January 2015.

=== Preliminary round ===
Prior to the final telecast, the delegates compete in the preliminary competition, which involves private interviews with the judges and a presentation show where they compete in swimsuit and evening gown. It will be held on August 21, 2015, and broadcast on the Miss Teen USA website.

=== Finals ===
During the final competition, the top fifteen competed in swimsuit and evening gown, and the top five competed in the final question signed up by a panel of judges. The winner of the pageant will get to wear the new crown made by Diamonds International Corporation, a Czech-based jeweler, the newest official jewelry maker of Miss Teen USA.

== Contestants ==
51 delegates participated:

State	Name	Age^{1}	Height	Hometown	Placement	Awards	Notes
Alabama	Taylor Ryan Elliott	18	5 ft 3 in 160 cm	Trussville	Top 15		
Alaska	Katelyn Cusack	18	5 ft 8 in 173 cm	Anchorage			
Arizona	Neda Danilovic	17	5 ft 7 in 170 cm	Phoenix	Top 15		Born in Serbia.
Arkansas	Arynn Johnson	18	5 ft 7 in 170 cm	Hot Springs	Top 15		Later Miss Arkansas USA 2017
California	Melanie Mitchell	17	5 ft 10 in 178 cm	Anaheim Hills	1st Runner-up		
Colorado	Taylor Kelly	18	5 ft 9 in 175 cm	Castle Pines			Previously Miss Colorado Teen 2012; Later 4th runner-up at Miss Colorado USA 2017
Connecticut	Savannah Giammarco	17	5 ft 6 in 168 cm	Middletown			Later 1st runner-up at Miss Connecticut 2017–19; Later 3rd runner-up at Miss Connecticut USA 2019; Later 3rd runner-up at Miss Connecticut USA 2021
Delaware	Sierra Wright	18	5 ft 6 in 168 cm	Wilmington			Later Miss Delaware USA 2018
District of Columbia	Niara Iman (Tarlenton-Allen)	17	5 ft 5 in 165 cm	Washington, D.C.			
Florida	Jara Courson	18	5 ft 10 in 178 cm	Lake City			
Georgia	Mary Calkins	17	5 ft 10 in 178 cm	Augusta			
Hawaii	Kyla Hee	18	5 ft 6 in 168 cm	Honolulu			Daughter of Miss Hawaii 1987 Luana Alapa
Idaho	Chaise Goris	18	5 ft 7 in 170 cm	Eagle			
Illinois	Megan Riesner	19	5 ft 7 in 170 cm	Plainfield			
Indiana	Kassidy Tharp	18	5 ft 10 in 178 cm	Sullivan			3rd runner up at Miss Indiana's Outstanding Teen 2014
Iowa	Aryn Book	19	5 ft 7 in 170 cm	Adel			Later 2nd runner-up at Miss Iowa USA 2020
Kansas	Melanie Shaner	18	5 ft 8 in 173 cm	Overland Park			Later Miss Kansas USA 2018
Kentucky	Caroline Ford	18	5 ft 7 in 170 cm	Bowling Green			3rd runner up at Miss Kentucky's Outstanding Teen 2014
Louisiana	Katherine Haik	15	5 ft 10 in 178 cm	Franklinton	Miss Teen USA 2015		
Maine	Skyler Gaudette	16	5 ft 5 in 165 cm	Saco			
Maryland	Taylor Dawson	18	5 ft 7 in 170 cm	Germantown			
Massachusetts	Sophie Baird	18	5 ft 6 in 168 cm	Andover	4th Runner-up		
Michigan	Maria Elizabeth Rendina	19	5 ft 4 in 163 cm	Monroe			Later top 15 at Miss Michigan USA 2020
Minnesota	Hayden Hammond	19	5 ft 6 in 168 cm	Maple Grove			
Mississippi	Andrea Hightower	17	5 ft 4 in 163 cm	Oxford			
Missouri	Christina Stratton	16	5 ft 9 in 175 cm	Sedalia	Top 15	Miss Photogenic	
Montana	Miranda Youngren	18	5 ft 6 in 168 cm	Reed Point			
Nebraska	Paige Pflueger	18	5 ft 6 in 168 cm	Norfolk			Daughter of Miss Nebraska 1980 Paula Louise Mitchell
Nevada	Geovanna Hilton	18	5 ft 8 in 173 cm	Las Vegas			
New Hampshire	Ellie Lathram	18	5 ft 6 in 168 cm	Bedford			
New Jersey	Jacqueline Giancola	18	5 ft 7 in 170 cm	East Brunswick			Later top 10 at Miss Alabama USA 2018
New Mexico	Nicolette Pacheco	18	5 ft 6 in 168 cm	Rio Rancho			Later top 11 at Miss Indiana USA 2020
New York	Geena Cardalena	18	5 ft 6 in 168 cm	Floral Park	Top 15		
North Carolina	Jane Axhoj	17	5 ft 10 in 178 cm	Waxhaw	2nd Runner-up		Later Miss North Carolina USA 2020
North Dakota	Hannah Nelson	18	5 ft 7 in 170 cm	Hunter			
Ohio	Shelby Stapleton	16	5 ft 10 in 178 cm	Hilliard			
Oklahoma	Cherokee Pearce	19	5 ft 9 in 175 cm	Owasso	Top 15		
Oregon	Kenna Sloy	18	5 ft 10 in 178 cm	Boring			
Pennsylvania	Jasmine Daniels	19	5 ft 9 in 175 cm	Collegeville	Top 15		Later Miss Pennsylvania USA 2023
Rhode Island	Mary Malloy	18	5 ft 8 in 173 cm	Cumberland			Later Miss Rhode Island USA 2023
South Carolina	Wesley Mitchell	19	5 ft 8 in 173 cm	Lexington	Top 15		
South Dakota	Marley Hanson	17	5 ft 3 in 160 cm	Vermillion			1st runner up at Miss South Dakota's Outstanding Teen 2014; Later 3rd runner-up at Miss South Dakota 2016; Later 3rd runner-up at Miss South Dakota USA 2017
Tennessee	Hannah Faith Greene	17	6 ft 0 in 183 cm	Chattanooga	3rd Runner-up		4th runner up at Miss Tennessee's Outstanding Teen 2014
Texas	Chloe Kembel	18	5 ft 7 in 170 cm	Denton	Top 15		
Utah	Brooke Skabelund	17	5 ft 8 in 173 cm	Logan			
Vermont	Alexandra Marek	16	5 ft 8 in 173 cm	Burlington	Top 15		
Virginia	Ann Kutyna	16	5 ft 9 in 175 cm	Herndon			
Washington	Priya Gopal-Walker	18	5 ft 5 in 165 cm	Seattle			
West Virginia	Cora King	17	5 ft 9 in 175 cm	Hurricane		Miss Congeniality	
Wisconsin	Kenna Harke	17	5 ft 9 in 175 cm	Greenville			
Wyoming	Payton Sanders	18	5 ft 6 in 168 cm	Casper			Sister of Karlie Sanders Miss Wyoming Teen USA 2014

^{1} As at August 22, 2015
