= Miss Louisiana Teen USA =

Beauty pageant competition

- Formation: 1983
- Type: Beauty pageant
- Headquarters: Aiken
- Location: South Carolina
- Members: Miss Teen USA
- Official language: English
- Website: Official website

The Miss Louisiana Teen USA competition is the pageant that selects the representative for the state of Louisiana in the Miss Teen USA pageant.

Louisiana is in the top 10 most successful states at Miss Teen USA in terms of number and value of placements. Notable former Miss Louisiana Teen USA titleholders are Miss USA 1996 Ali Landry, Miss Teen USA 2004 Shelley Hennig, Miss Teen USA 2015 Katherine Haik, and Jennifer Dupont, who placed first runner-up at Miss America 2005. Landry and Hennig have gone on to successful acting careers. Candice Stewart, Miss Louisiana Teen USA 2002 was a contestant on CBS's Big Brother 15 in 2013.

At 15, Haik is the youngest woman to win the Miss Teen USA title.

Miss Louisiana Teen USA is produced by A Blaize Productions since 2025, which also produces the Miss USA and Miss Teen USA state pageants for Alabama, North Carolina and South Carolina.

Kadie Sumbler of Baton Rouge was crowned Miss Louisiana Teen USA 2026 on July 11, 2026 at Mississippi State University in Starkville. She represented Louisiana at Miss Teen USA 2026.

== Gallery of titleholders ==
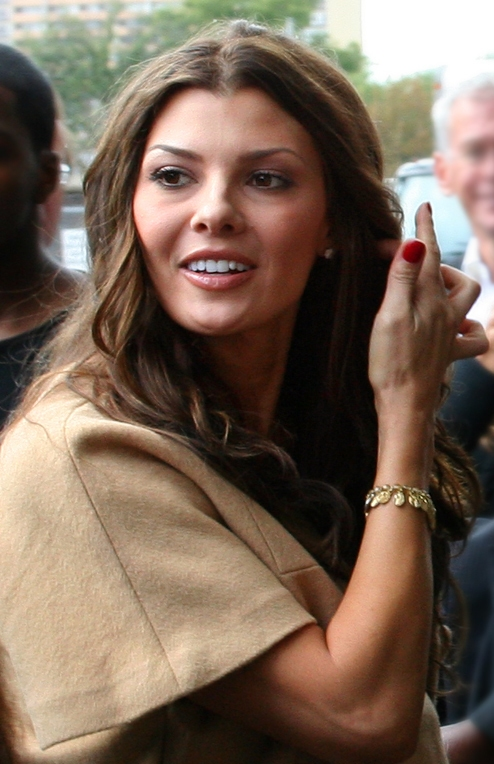
Ali Landry, Miss Louisiana Teen USA 1990, Miss Louisiana USA 1996 and Miss USA 1996

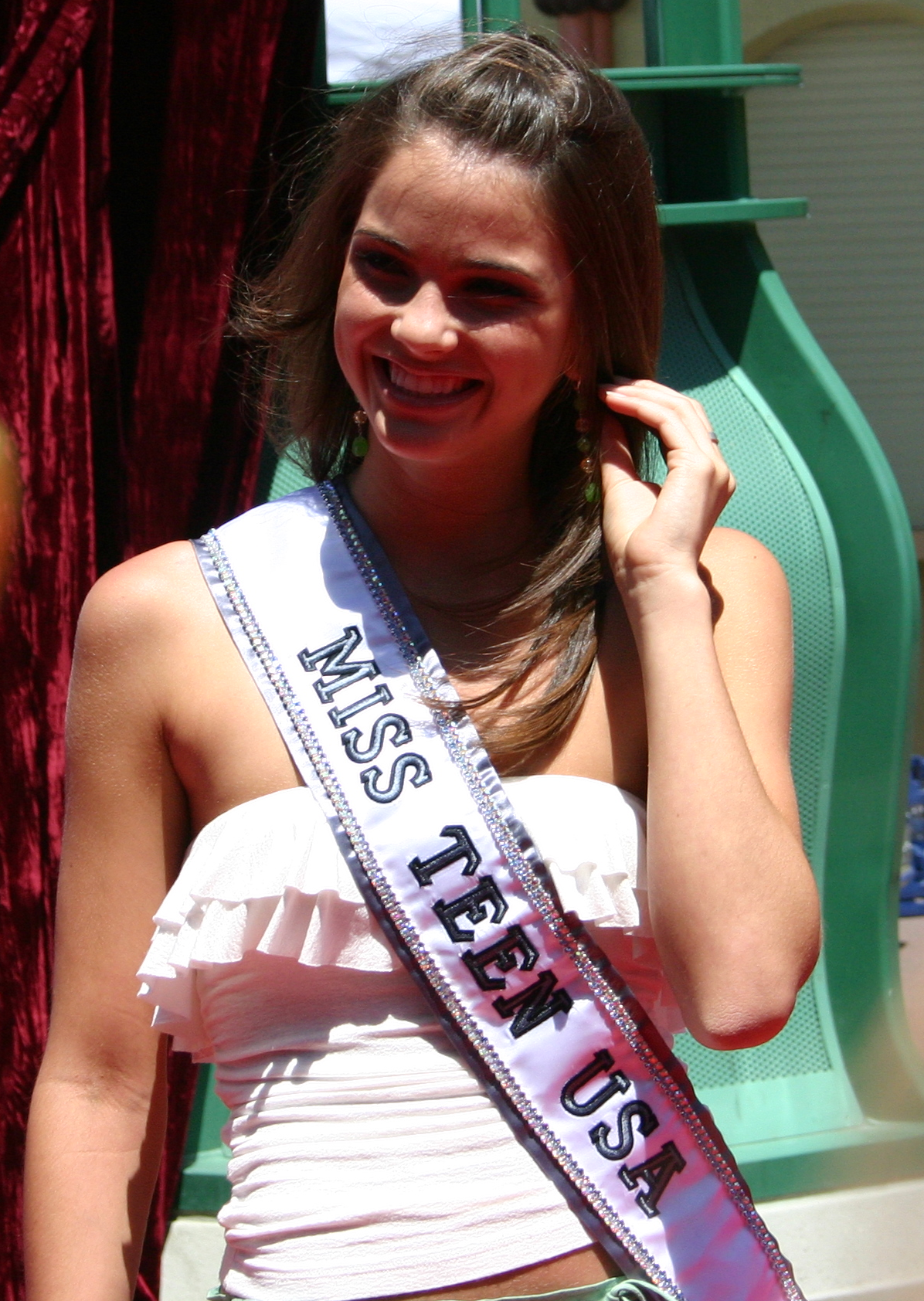
Shelley Hennig, Miss Louisiana Teen USA and Miss Teen USA 2004

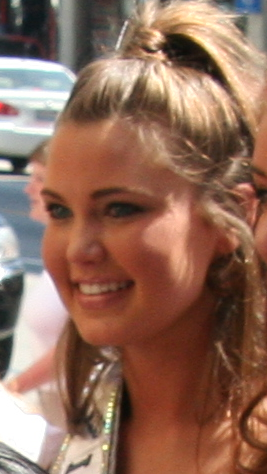
Logan Travis, Miss Louisiana Teen USA 2007

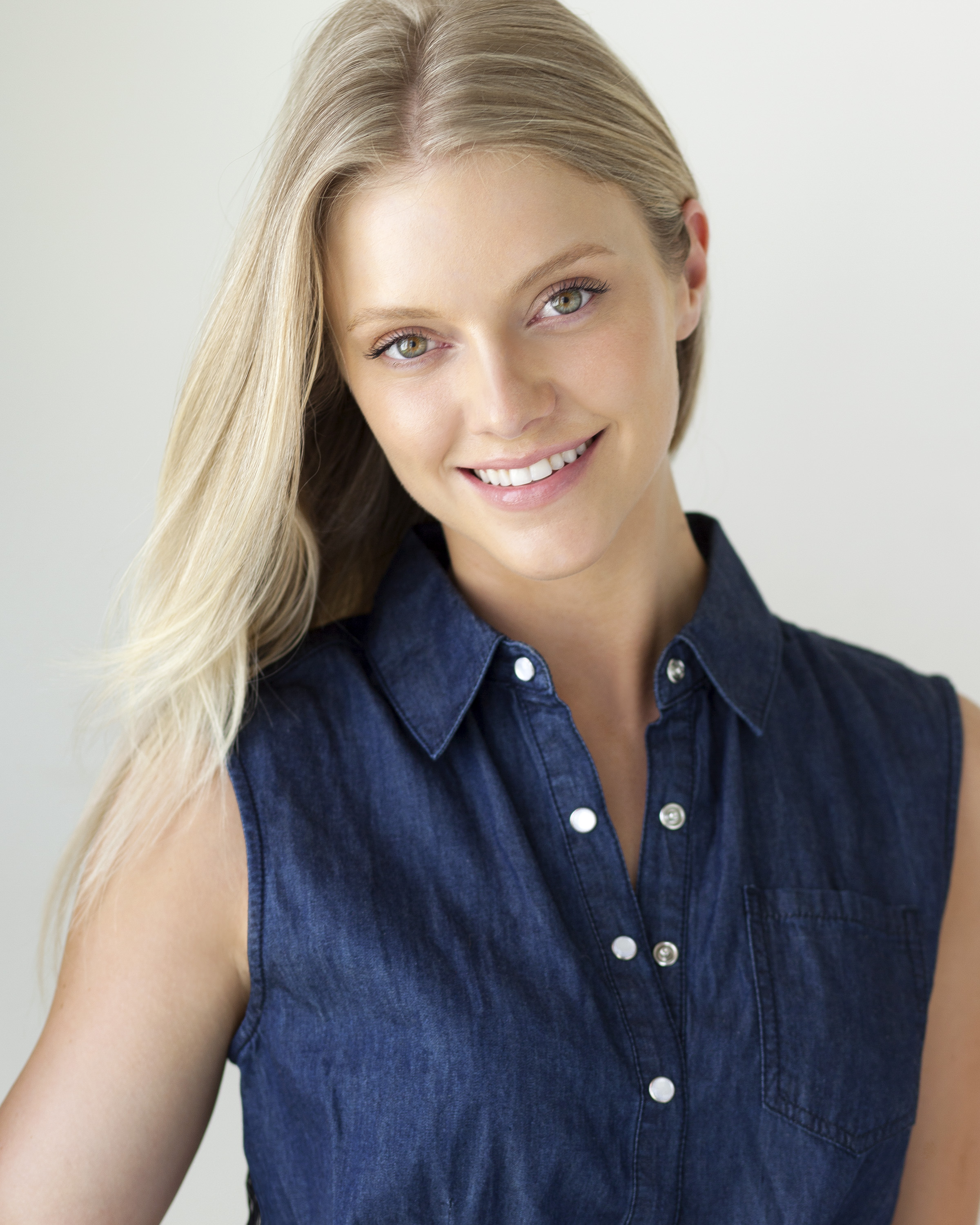
Elle Evans, Miss Louisiana Teen USA 2008

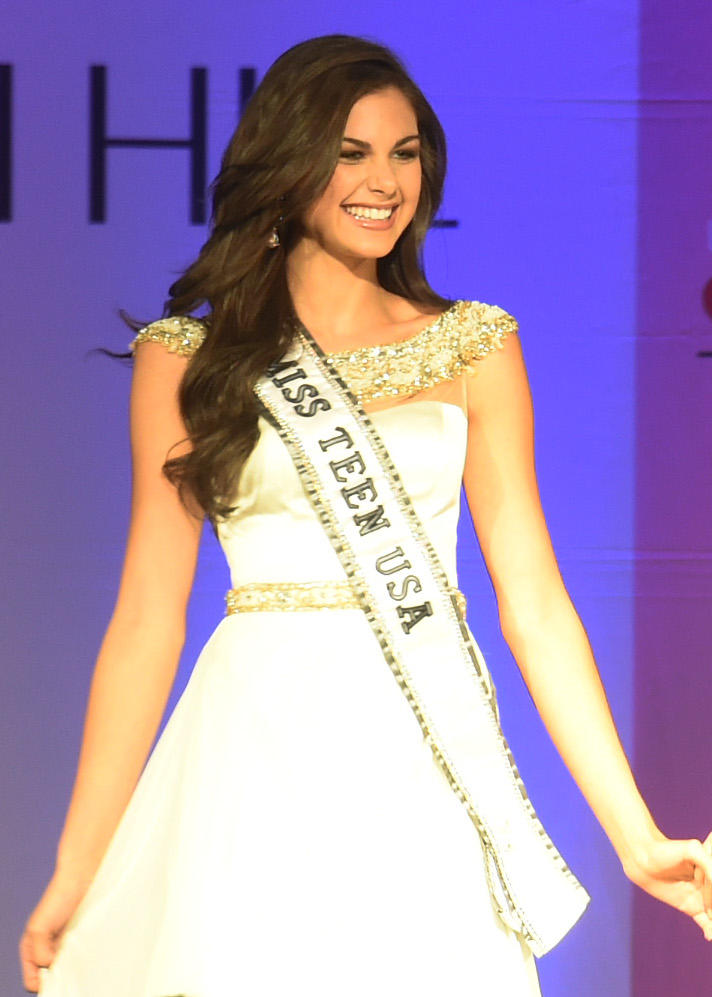
Katherine Haik, Miss Louisiana Teen USA 2015 and Miss Teen USA 2015

== Results summary ==
=== Placements ===
- Miss Teen USAs: Shelley Hennig (2004), Katherine Haik (2015)
- 1st runners-up: Sarah Thornhill (1999)
- 2nd runners-up: Bobbie Brown (1987), Amy Pietsch (1988)
- 3rd runners-up: Lindsey Evans (2008)
- 4th runners-up: Brittany Guidry (2009), Sydney Taylor (2020)
- Top 6: Allison McIntyre (1991)
- Top 10: Shasta St. Angelo (1986), Nina Moch (2000), Paige Egan (2001), Lindsey Conque (2018)
- Top 12: Ali Landry (1990), Sarah Lowther (1994)
- Top 15/16/20: Bailey Hidalgo (2013), Ellie Picone (2016), Gracie Petry (2021), Kadie Sumbler (2026)

Louisiana holds a record of 19 placements at Miss Teen USA.

=== Awards ===
- Miss Congeniality: Robin Swain (1984)
- People's Choice Award: Kadie Sumbler (2026)

== Winners ==
- Declared as Winner
- Ended as runner-up
- Ended as one of the finalists or semifinalists

Year	Name	Hometown	Age^{1}	Local title	Placement at Miss Teen USA	Special Awards at Miss Teen USA	Notes
2026	Kadie Sumbler	Baton Rouge	15	Miss Sportsman's Paradise Teen	Top 20	People's Choice Award	
2025	Heaven Riley Breaux	Lafayette	17	Miss Greater Baton Rouge Teen			
2024	Ava Watson	New Orleans	17	Miss New Orleans Teen			
2023	Averi Crawford	Baton Rouge	16	Miss St. Bernard Parrish Teen			
2022	Ainsley Ross	Bossier City	18	Miss Bossier City Teen			
2021	Gracie Petry	Lafayette	18	Miss Lafayette Teen	Top 16		
2020	Sydney Taylor	Livingston	18	Miss Lafayette Teen	4th Runner Up		Later Miss Louisiana USA 2024
2019	Emma Brooks McAllister	Houma	16	Miss Bayou State Teen			
2018	Lindsey Conque	Lafayette	16	Miss Lafayette Teen	Top 10		
2017	Hailey Crausby	Lake Charles	18	Miss Northshore Teen			
2016	Ellie Picone	Mandeville	16	Miss Mandeville Teen	Top 15		
2015	Katherine Haik	Franklinton	15	Miss Northshore Teen	Miss Teen USA 2015		
2014	Mary Risener	Houma	18	Miss Florida Parishes Teen			
2013	Bailey Hidalgo	Denham Springs	15	Miss Camellia City Teen	Top 16		
2012	Marlee Henry	Lacassine	18	Miss Lakeshore Teen			
2011	Elizabeth Heinen	Eunice	16				
2010	Brianna Waguespack	Paulina	15				
2009	Brittany Alyson Guidry	Houma	16		4th runner-up		Later Miss Louisiana USA 2014; 3rd runner-up at Miss USA 2014
2008	Lindsey Gayle Evans	Blanchard	18		3rd runner-up		Dethroned October 21, 2008 due to arrest for theft and drug possession. Posed in Playboy, seen in Blurred Lines
2007	Logan Travis	Amite	15				
2006	Kelsey Lawson	Baton Rouge	17				
2005	Morgan Maulden	Prairieville	18				
2004	Keisha Barras	Delcambre	17		Did not compete		Originally first runner-up; assumed the title after Hennig won Miss Teen USA 2004
2004	Shelley Catherine Hennig	Destrehan	17		Miss Teen USA 2004		
2003	Megan Bologna	Covington	19				
2002	Candice Dontrelle Stewart	Metairie	18				Later Miss Louisiana USA 2005
2001	Paige Egan	New Orleans	18		Semi-finalist		
2000	Jonine Aimee “Nina” Moch	Shreveport	18		Semi-finalist		
1999	Sarah Thornhill	Slidell	18		1st runner-up		
1998	Jennifer Dupont	Plaquemine	17				Later Miss Louisiana USA 2000; Later Miss Louisiana 2004; First runner-up at Miss America 2005.
1997	Sarah Price	Mandeville					Sister of Miss Louisiana Teen USA 1995, Shawn Price
1996	Kimi Fairchild	Denham Springs	15				
1995	Shawn Price	Mandeville					Sister of Miss Louisiana Teen USA 1997, Sarah Price
1994	Sarah Lowther	Covington	18		Semi-finalist		
1993	Heather DuPree	Baton Rouge	16				Later Miss Louisiana 1998; Daughter of Miss Mississippi 1969, Jane Foshee; Mothers of Miss Louisiana's Teen 2023 & 2025, Laura Jane and Virginia Kirkpatrick
1992	Evelyn Ellis	Sulphur	18				
1991	Allison McIntyre	Baton Rouge	16		Top 6		
1990	Ali Germaine Landry	Breaux Bridge	16		Semi-finalist		Later Miss Louisiana USA 1996; Miss USA 1996; Finished 6th at Miss Universe 1996
1989	Kim Clower	West Monroe					
1988	Amy Pietsch	Ringgold	18		2nd runner-up		
1987	Bobbie Jean Brown	Baton Rouge	17		2nd runner-up		
1986	Shasta St. Angelo	Baton Rouge	17		Semi-finalist		
1985	Julie Scimeca	Baton Rouge					
1984	Robin Swain	Baton Rouge				Miss Congeniality	
1983	Vail Cavalier	Houma	18				

^{1} Age at the time of the Miss Teen USA pageant
