= Miss Alaska Teen USA =

Beauty pageant competition

- Formation: 1983
- Type: Beauty pageant
- Headquarters: Anchorage
- Location: Alaska
- Members: Miss Teen USA
- Official language: English
- Website: Official website

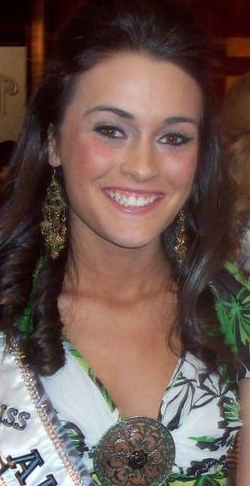
Victoria Ray, Miss Alaska Teen USA 2008

Miss Alaska Teen USA is the pageant that selects the representative for the state of Alaska in the Miss Teen USA pageant and the name of the title held by that winner.

The pageant is part of the Miss Universe Organization which also holds the Miss USA and Miss Universe pageants. The Miss Alaska Teen USA pageant is generally held in the late fall or early winter in Anchorage, Alaska together with the Miss Alaska USA. The pageant is currently directed by Simply Stunning LLC from 2015 until 2024.

Alaska has never won Miss Teen USA title, with only three teens making the semi-finals or better. However, Marla Johnson placed 1st runner-up to Bridgette Wilson of Oregon at Miss Teen USA 1990. The other two placements are recent, coming in 2003 and 2005. Alaska has not won any special awards in Miss Teen USA.

Three Alaska teens later won the Miss Alaska USA title.

Allison Kirksey of Anchorage was crowned Miss Alaska Teen USA 2026 on June 28, 2026 at Glenn Massay Theater in The University Of Alaska in Palmer. Kirksey will represent Alaska at Miss Teen USA 2026.

== Results summary ==
=== Placements ===
- 1st runner-up: Marla Johnson (1990)
- Top 10: Brittany Jackson (2003)
- Top 15: Sonja Garness (2005)

Alaska holds a record of 3 placements at Miss Teen USA.

== Winners ==
- Declared as Winner
- Ended as runner-up
- Ended as one of the finalists or semifinalists

Year	Name	Hometown	Age^{1}	Local title	Placement at Miss Teen USA	Special awards at Miss Teen USA	Notes
2026	Allison Kirksey	Anchorage	16	Miss Arctic Teen			
2025	Josephine Herbert	Palmer	18	Miss North Star Teen			
2024	Nevaeh James	Anchorage	16	Miss Anchorage Teen			
2023	Star Hunter	Anchorage	16	Miss South Anchorage Teen			
2022	Madison Hines	Eagle River	16	Miss Eagle River Teen			
2021	Ellie Smith	Anchorage	18				Daughter of Sarah Ann Smith, Miss Alaska Teen USA 1998
2020	Jadyn Fraser	Fairbanks	15				Previously Miss Teen Earth Alaska 2018
2019	Meghan Scott	Eagle River	16				
2018	McKinley Wooten	Palmer	16				
2017	Tana Bartels	Fairbanks	18				
2016	Nneamaka Isolokwu	Anchorage	18				
2015	Katelyn Cusack	Anchorage	17				
2014	Whitney Williams	Anchorage	17				
2013	Kimberly Agron	Anchorage	18				Later Miss Alaska USA 2015 and congeniality winner at Miss USA 2015, tied with Miss Delaware USA Renee Bull
2012	Veronica Temple	Eagle River	18				Sister of Miss Alaska USA 2010 Sarah Temple: Previously Miss Alaska's Outstanding Teen 2009;
2011	Denali Whiting	Kotzebue	19				First Inupiaq Eskimo to hold the title
2010	Kali Scott	Anchorage	17				
2009	Zlata Sushchik	Anchorage	19				
2008	Victoria Ray	Eagle River	18				
2007	Muriel Clauson	Anchorage	17				
2006	Degen Kasper	Anchorage	17				
2005	Sonja Garness	Anchorage	17		Top 15		Sister of Rachel Garness, Miss Alaska Teen USA 2002
2004	Nina Sutherlin	Anchorage	18				
2003	Brittany Ann Jackson	Wasilla	17		Top 10		
2002	Rachel Marie Garness	Anchorage	15				Sister of Sonja Garness, Miss Alaska Teen USA 2005
2001	Danielle Smith	Anchorage	18				
2001	Kaylen Kelley						Resigned title prior to national pageant
2000	Christina Olejniczak	Palmer	18				Later Miss Alaska USA 2002
1999	Kjersti Parker	Anchorage	18				
1998	Sarah Ann Smith	Anchorage	16				Mother of Elle Smith, Miss Alaska Teen USA 2021
1997	Laurie Ann Miller	Wasilla	18				Later Miss Alaska USA 2000
1996	Brandee McCoskey	Anchorage	18				
1995	Heather Evans	Sitka					
1994	Kristina Bellamy	Anchorage					
1993	Christina Thornton	Anchorage					
1992	Cindy Bridges	Fairbanks					
1991	Stacey Stewart	Eagle River					
1990	Marla Johnson	Anchorage	18		1st runner-up		
1989	Amy Allen	Fairbanks					
1988	Joleen Jeffcoat	Fairbanks					
1987	Lauren Straubb	Wasilla					
1986	Bobbie Mitchell	Fairbanks					
1985	Debbie Eason	Fairbanks					
1984	Dawn Goldi	Fairbanks	17				
1983	Linda Kay Fickus	Fairbanks	18				Sister of Miss Alaska USA 1980 Debby Fickus Died from breast cancer in 2008.

^{1} Age at the time of the Miss Teen USA pageant
