= Karlie Hay =

American model and beauty queen

- Born: Karlie Denise Hay; December 12, 1997 (age 28); Tomball, Texas, U.S.
- Height: 5 ft 7 in (1.70 m)
- Beauty pageant titleholder
- Title: Miss Texas Teen USA 2016; Miss Teen USA 2016
- Hair color: Blonde
- Eye color: Blue
- Major competitions: Miss Texas Teen USA 2016 (Winner); Miss Teen USA 2016 (Winner)

Karlie Denise Hay (born December 12, 1997) is an American model and beauty queen who was crowned Miss Teen USA 2016. She is the first Texan to win the crown since 2011.

== Early life ==
Hay was born on December 12, 1997, in Tomball, Texas. As a child, some of her family members dealt with alcoholism and substance abuse. She graduated from Tomball High School in 2016, where she was a cheerleader.

== Pageantry ==
=== Miss Texas Teen USA 2016 ===
Hay represented Kemah in the Miss Texas Teen USA 2016 pageant. On November 29, 2015, she was crowned the winner by outgoing titleholder Chloe Kembel, beating out first runner-up Thekla McCarthy of La Grange.

=== Miss Teen USA 2016 ===
On July 30, 2016, Hay was crowned Miss Teen USA 2016 by outgoing titleholder Katherine Haik. She beat out first runner-up Emily Wakeman of North Carolina.

==== Controversy ====
Almost immediately following Hay's crowning as Miss Teen USA 2016, screenshots of her Twitter account dating from 2013 and 2014 were released with Hay repeatedly using the words "nigga" and "nigger". This sparked outrage amongst fans, who accused Hay of racism. Miss Teen USA 2010 Kamie Crawford condemned Hay for not cleaning up her Twitter account prior to becoming a public figure. Hay went on to apologize on her Twitter account for what she calls language that she's "not proud of and that there is no excuse for."

Awards and achievements
Preceded by (Louisiana) Katherine Haik	Miss Teen USA; 2016	Succeeded by (Missouri) Sophia Dominguez-Heithoff
Preceded by Chloe Kembel	Miss Texas Teen USA; 2016	Succeeded by Kirby Lindley
