= Katherine Haik =

American model (born 2000)

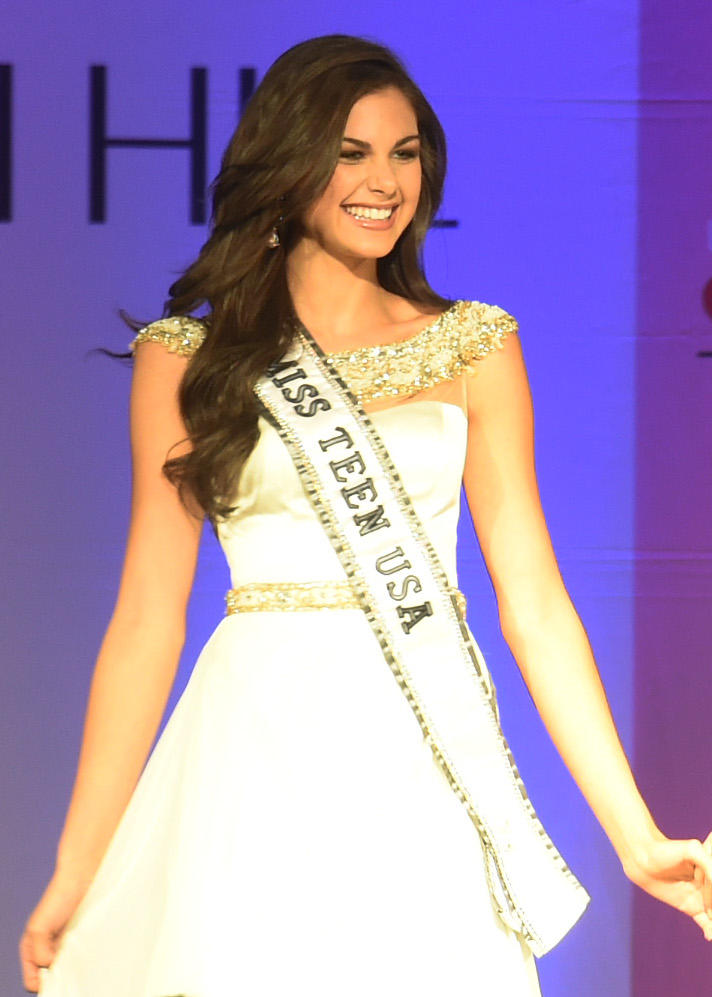
- Haik at "Operation That’s My Dress" at Creech Air Force Base in 2015
- Born: Katherine Olivia Haik; May 9, 2000 (age 26); Covington, Louisiana, U.S.
- Height: 5 ft 10 in (1.78 m)
- Beauty pageant titleholder
- Title: Miss Louisiana Teen USA 2015; Miss Teen USA 2015
- Hair color: Brown
- Eye color: Green
- Major competitions: Miss Teen USA 2015 (Winner)

Katherine Olivia Haik (/haɪk/ HYKE; born May 9, 2000) is an American model and beauty queen who was crowned Miss Teen USA 2015. At age 15, she was the youngest contestant to ever be crowned Miss Teen USA as well as the second entrant from Louisiana to win the title, following Shelley Hennig who won Miss Teen USA 2004.

== Early life and education ==
Haik was born on May 9, 2000, in Covington, Louisiana to Tim and Jennifer Haik, yet was raised in Franklinton. She graduated from Franklinton High School in 2018, and attends Louisiana State University, where she is a member of Kappa Delta sorority. She graduated from LSU in May 2022.

== Pageantry ==
Haik competed in Miss Louisiana Teen USA 2015 and won the competition. She went on to compete at Miss Teen USA 2015, where was crowned the winner.

After the announcement that the Miss Teen USA competition would eliminate the swimsuit round in 2016, Haik publicly stated that she supported the decision to switch the component of the competition to athleisure, adding it was "a great way to celebrate the active lives that so many young women lead and set a strong example for our peers."

== Personal life ==
Haik is a member of the First Baptist Church of Franklinton, Louisiana and has played softball since the age of 3.

Awards and achievements
Preceded by (South Carolina) K. Lee Graham	Miss Teen USA; 2015	Succeeded by (Texas) Karlie Hay
Preceded by Mary Risener	Miss Louisiana Teen USA; 2015	Succeeded by Ellie Picone
