= Christie Lee Woods =

Miss Teen USA 1996 and The Amazing Race 5 runner-up

- Occupations: Pageant titleholder, actress

Christie Lee Woods is an American actress and beauty pageant titleholder who was crowned Miss Teen USA 1996.

Woods first came to prominence as a beauty queen, winning the Miss Houston Teen USA title in 1995. She later appeared as an actress and as a participant on reality television show, The Amazing Race.

== Pageant ==
Woods won the Miss Houston Teen USA title in 1995.

== Television ==
=== Acting ===
Woods played Rowena in the TV series The New Adventures of Robin Hood in the late 1990s. She also had guest appearances on Malibu, CA (1998) and USA High (1998).

== The Amazing Race ==
=== The Amazing Race 5 ===
In January 2004, Woods competed on the fifth season of the CBS adventure reality show The Amazing Race with her boyfriend, Colin Guinn. The two reached the final leg of the race, but lost the final leg to fellow racers, married parents Chip and Kim McAllister.

=== The Amazing Race 5 finishes ===
- An underlined blue placement with a double-dagger (‡) indicates that Colin and Christie were the last to arrive at a pit stop in a non-elimination leg.
- A green ƒ indicates that Colin and Christie won the Fast Forward.
- A brown < indicates that Colin and Christie were on the receiving end of a Yield.

Roadblocks performed by Woods are bolded

Episode	Leg	Destination(s)	Detour choice (underlined)	Roadblock performance	Placement	Notes
1	1	United States → Uruguay	Zips/Chips	No roadblock	7th of 11	
2	2	Uruguay → Argentina	Perro/Tango	Colin	6th of 10	
3	3	Argentina	Smooth Sailing/Rough Riding	Colin	1st of 9	
4	4	Argentina → Russia	Block 5 shots/Drink 1 shot	**Christie**	2nd of 8	
5	5	Russia → Egypt	Used fast forward		1st of 7ƒ	
6	6	Egypt	Herd it/Haul it	Colin	1st of 7	
7	7	Egypt → Kenya → Tanzania	Buzzing/Busy	Colin	2nd of 6	
8	8	Tanzania → United Arab Emirates	Off place/Off-road	No roadblock	1st of 5	
9	9	United Arab Emirates → India	Heavy but short/Light but long	Colin	1st of 5	
10	10	India → New Zealand	Clean/Dirty	Colin	1st of 5	
11	11	New Zealand → Philippines	Plow/Fowl	Colin	4th of 4‡<	
11	12	Philippines	No detour	Colin	3rd of 4	
11	13	Philippines → Canada → United States	Slide/Ride	No roadblock	2nd of 3	

=== The Amazing Race 11 ===
Woods and Guinn were also expecting to be in the All-Star edition of the show; however, Woods was expecting the couple's first child and therefore could not participate.

=== The Amazing Race 31 ===
In 2019, Woods and Guinn competed on and won The Amazing Race 31.
