= Miss Utah Teen USA =

Beauty pageant competition

- Formation: 1983
- Type: Beauty pageant
- Headquarters: Salt Lake City
- Location: Utah
- Members: Miss Teen USA
- Official language: English
- Key people: Shanna Moakler (executive director)
- Website: Official website

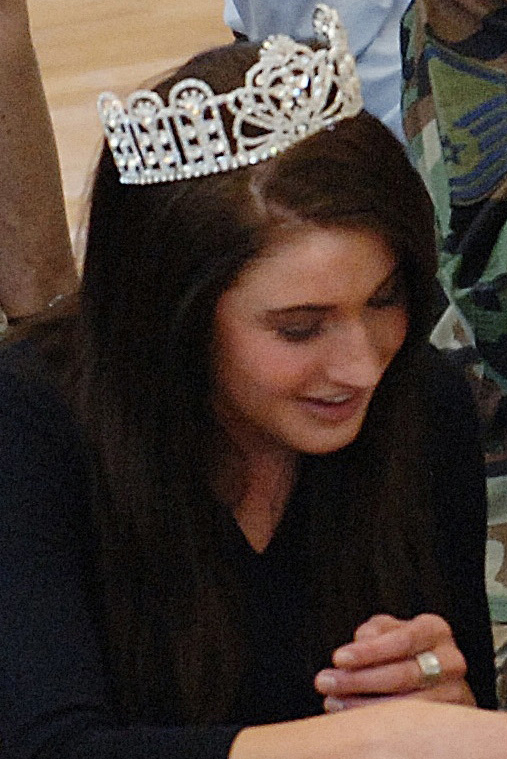
Kelsey Brigel, Miss Utah Teen USA 2007

Miss Utah Teen USA competition is the pageant that selects the representative for the state of Utah in the Miss Teen USA pageant. From 2001 to 2007, the pageant was produced by Red Curtain Productions. Casting Crowns Productions directed the pageant from 2007 to 2018 under the directorship of former Miss Missouri USA Britt Boyse. Smoak Productions became the new director for Miss and Teen pageants in 2019 under executive director and Miss USA 1995 Shanna Moakler.

Utah is one of the least successful states at Miss Teen USA, having only placed nine times. The first placement came in 1995, when Loni Sorden placed 2nd runner-up to Keylee Sue Sanders of Kansas. Utah was the fourth-to-last state (equal) to place at Miss Teen USA. Utah's second placement was in 2009, with Tasha Smedley making the top 15. The third placement was the following year, when Angelia Layton placed 3rd runner-up. In 2012, Keilara McCormick finished in the top 16, in 2017 Rachel Bell placed in the top 15, and in 2018 Madilen Kellogg placed top 10.

Five Utah teens have won the Miss Utah USA title and competed at Miss USA. The most recent of these is Angelia Nichole Layton, Miss Utah Teen USA 2010 and Miss Utah USA 2014, who is also part of Red Curtain Productions. Three Miss Utah Teen USA winners who won the Miss Utah Teen USA titles went on to place at Miss USA like the Miss North Carolina USA titleholders.

Maizy Baldwin of St. George was crowned Miss Utah Teen USA 2026 on June 7, 2026 at Rose Wagner Performing Arts Center Jeanné Wagner Theatre in Salt Lake City. She will represent Utah at Miss Teen USA 2026.

== Results summary ==
=== Placements ===
- 2nd runner-up: Loni Sorden (1995)
- 3rd runner-up: Angelia Layton (2010)
- 4th runner-up: Ayzjiahna Wood (2021)
- Top 10: Madilen Kellogg (2018)
- Top 15: Tasha Smedley (2009), Rachel Bell (2017)
- Top 16: Keilara McCormick (2012)
- Top 20: Jocelyn Osmond (2023), Sofia Forrest-Turner (2024)

Utah holds a record of 9 placements at Miss Teen USA.

=== Awards ===
- Best State Costume: Ayzjiahna Wood (2021)

== Winners ==
- Declared as Winner
- Ended as runner-up
- Ended as one of the finalists or semifinalists

| Year | Name | Hometown | Age (Note: Age at the time of the Miss Teen USA pageant) | Local title | Placement at Miss Teen USA | Special awards at Miss Teen USA | Notes |
|---|---|---|---|---|---|---|---|
| 2026 | Maizy Baldwin | St. George | 17 | Miss St.George Teen | | | |
| 2025 | Lianna Beltre | Provo | (Note: Age disputed. Most sources Beltre's age was 20 at the time of Miss Teen USA) | Miss Provo Teen | | | |
| 2024 | Sofia Forrest-Turner | Provo | 18 | Miss Provo Teen | Top 20 | | |
| 2023 | Jocelyn Osmond | Alpine | 16 | Miss Timpanogos Teen | Top 20 | | Previously Miss Utah's Outstanding Teen 2022; Top 11 semifinalist at Miss America's Outstanding Teen 2023; Daughter of Heather Henderson Osmond, Miss Utah Teen USA 1994; Granddaughter of Virl Osmond, and great-niece of Donny and Marie Osmond; Originally first runner-up, assumed the title after Anjolie Karmen relinquished |
| 2023 | Anjolie Karmen | Salt Lake City | 19 | Miss Salt Lake City Teen | Did not compete | | Relinquished the title on August 2, 2023 due to residency issues. |
| 2022 | Maizy Abbott | Pleasant View | 19 | Miss Northern Utah Teen | | | |
| 2021 | Ayzjiahna Wood | Clearfield | 16 | Miss Northern Utah Teen | 4th runner-up | Best State Costume | Later Miss Teen Volunteer America 2024; Miss Utah Teen Volunteer 2023 |
| 2020 | Brooklyn Baton | Corinne | 17 | Miss Box Elder County Teen | | | |
| 2019 | Kaylyn Slevin | Salt Lake City | 18 | Miss Sundance Teen | | | |
| 2018 | Madilen Kellogg | Layton | 18 | Miss Davis County Teen | Top 10 | | |
| 2017 | Rachel Bell | Sandy | 18 | Miss Wasatch Front Teen | Top 15 | Best Sense of Humor | Younger sister of Miss Utah USA 2012, Kendyl Bell |
| 2016 | AbbyJade Larson | Salt Lake City | 16 | Miss North Logan Teen | | | |
| 2015 | Brooke Skabelund | Logan | 17 | Miss Logan Teen | | | |
| 2014 | Savannah Lancaster | Salt Lake City | 18 | Miss Northern Utah Teen | | | |
| 2013 | Chloe Crump | Highland | 17 | Miss Highland Teen | | | |
| 2012 | Keilara McCormick | Lehi | 17 | Miss North Utah County Teen | Top 16 | | |
| 2011 | Maqael Knight | Salt Lake City | 17 | Miss Sugarhouse Teen | | | |
| 2010 | Angelia Layton | Manti | 18 | Miss Manti Teen | 3rd runner-up | | Later Miss Utah USA 2014; Contestant of Survivor: Philippines |
| 2009 | Tasha Smedley | Syracuse | 18 | Miss North Davis Teen | Top 15 | | Previously Miss Utah's Outstanding Teen 2006 Resigned from Utah Teen USA title for personal reasons on September 17, 2009 |
| 2008 | Kate Feinstein | Centerville | 17 | Miss Centerville Teen | | | Later Miss Utah USA 2010 |
| 2007 | Kelsey Brigel | Draper | 17 | | | | |
| 2006 | Liz Leyda | Logan | 18 | | | | |
| 2005 | Julianne Burgener | Orem | 18 | | | | |
| 2004 | Honey Swift | Riverton | 18 | | | | |
| 2003 | Jessica Black | Farmington | 18 | | | | |
| 2002 | Marin Poole | Logan | 18 | | | | Later Miss Utah USA 2005; Top 15 at Miss USA 2005 |
| 2001 | Nicole Hansen | West Jordan | 18 | | | | |
| 2000 | Heather Crowther | American Fork | 18 | | | | |
| 1999 | Laurissa Solomon | Park City | 17 | | | | |
| 1998 | Trina Seymour | Santa Clara | 18 | | | | |
| 1997 | Amy Merrill | Layton | 17 | | | | |
| 1996 | Jodi Webb | Fruit Heights | 18 | | | | |
| 1995 | Loni Sorden | Virgin | 18 | | 2nd runner-up | | |
| 1994 | Heather Anne Henderson | Provo | 18 | | | | Later Mrs. Utah America 2007 and Top 15 semi-finalist at Mrs. America 2007 under her married name, Heather Osmond.; Mother of Jocelyn Osmond, Miss Utah's Outstanding Teen 2022 and Miss Utah Teen USA 2023 |
| 1993 | Amy Carlson | Sandy | 17 | | | | |
| 1992 | Susan Kelly | Sandy | 16 | | | | |
| 1991 | Corinn Peterson | Logan | 16 | | | | |
| 1990 | Melissa Anderson | Salt Lake City | 16 | | | | Later Miss Utah USA 1998; Top 5 at Miss USA 1998 |
| 1989 | Tracy Kennick | Price | 17 | | | | Later Miss Utah USA 1996; Top 10 at Miss USA 1996 |
| 1988 | Kathleen Treadway | Salt Lake City | 18 | | | | |
| 1987 | Tiffany DeMille | Orem | 17 | | | | |
| 1986 | Michelle Montgomery | Salt Lake City | 17 | | | | |
| 1985 | Susan Nelson | Sandy | 18 | | | | |
| 1984 | Leslie Hunt | Fillmore | 15 | | | | |
| 1983 | Natalie DeGraw | Farmington | 17 | | | | |
