= Miss Teen USA 2025 =

43rd edition of the Miss Teen USA competition

- Date: October 23, 2025
- Presenters: Taylor Hale
- Entertainment: Olivia Knox
- Venue: Grand Sierra Resort, Reno, Nevada
- Broadcaster: Queen Beauty Network
- Entrants: 51
- Placements: 20
- Winner: Mailyn Marsh; Missouri
- Congeniality: Charlotte Lange; Iowa
- Photogenic: Addison Hollensworth; Wyoming

Miss Teen USA 2025 was the 43rd Miss Teen USA pageant, held at Grand Sierra Resort in Reno, Nevada, on October 23, 2025. This was the first edition under the directorship of Thomas Brodeur, who also acquired the franchise.

Addie Carver of Mississippi crowned Mailyn Marsh of Missouri as her successor at the end of the event.

== Background ==
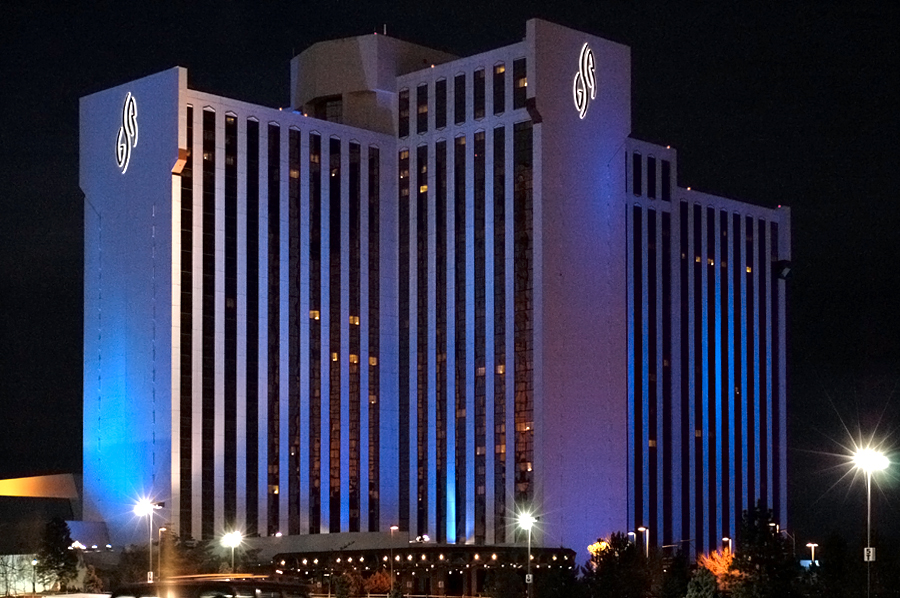
Grand Sierra Resort in Reno, Nevada, the host venue of Miss Teen USA 2025

=== Location ===
On September 15, 2025, it was announced that the competition would be taking place at Grand Sierra Resort in Reno, Nevada. This will be the fourth time that the pageant is held in Reno following Miss USA 2019, 2022 and 2023, and the third time in four years holding the pageant in the city, resumed its three-year deal had originally secured in 2022 under the ownership of then-national director and Miss USA 2008 Crystle Stewart.

=== Selection of contestants ===
Selection of delegates at state pageants began in January 2025 and concluded in September 2025. The first state pageant was Connecticut, held on January 26, 2025, and the last state pageants were Alabama and Louisiana, originally scheduled for September 21, 2025 but was moved up early one day to avoid the deadline for the open call to the eight unrepresented states the same day.

=== Appointed delegates ===
Several states in the Miss Teen USA 2025 competition could not hold traditional state pageants and instead appointed titleholders via an open casting call conducted by the national organization. These appointees had not won state competitions but were selected to ensure full national representation following leadership and licensing changes within the Miss USA Organization.

== Results ==
=== Placements ===
Placement	Contestant
Miss Teen USA 2025	Missouri – Mailyn Marsh
1st Runner-Up	Minnesota – Maisie Adams
2nd Runner-Up	Oklahoma – Ruthie Richey
3rd Runner-Up	Ohio – Helyna Park
4th Runner-Up	New York – Ginger Ragaishis
Top 10	Arizona – Eternity Hickman; Georgia – Kalysia Negron; Nevada – Cameron Reese; New Jersey – Océane Qian-Feuillat; Texas – Laika Kalyani Patel
Top 20	Arkansas – Jewelia Reece; California – Raynah Hudson; District of Columbia – Sarah Eyasu^{§}; Idaho – Drew Abdul-Wahab; Maine – Jazmine Werner; New Hampshire – Mia Dougherty^{§}; New Mexico – Ava Kincaid; Tennessee – Aniston Leigh Barnette; Wisconsin – Autumn Gunderson^{§}; Wyoming – Addison Hollensworth^{§}

§ Voted into the Top 20 by viewers

=== Special awards ===
Award	Contestant
Miss Photogenic	Wyoming – Addison Hollensworth
Chelsi Smith Congeniality Award	Iowa – Charlotte Lange
People's Choice	Wisconsin – Autumn Gunderson
Best State Costume	California – Raynah Hudson
Best in Activewear	Maine – Jazmine Werner

== Pageant ==
=== Judges ===
- Jena Sims – Actress, model and Miss Georgia Teen USA 2007
- Cassidy Wolf – Miss Teen USA 2013 from California
- Candiace Dillard Bassett – Television personality
- Madisyn Shipman – Actress and singer
- Josh Randall – Producer and casting director

== Contestants ==
51 contestants competed for the title.

State	Contestant	Age (Note: Ages at the time of the pageant)	Hometown	Notes
Alabama	Britain Fuller	16	Satsuma	
Alaska	Josephine Herbert	18	Palmer	
Arizona	Eternity Hickman	18	Maricopa	
Arkansas	Jewelia Reece	17	Lowell	
California	Raynah Hudson	17	Malibu	
Colorado	Savannah Wilson^{†}	18	Houston, TX	Previously competed in Miss Texas' Teen, having never competed in the Miss Teen USA state program
Connecticut	Daviana Plaza	18	North Franklin	
Delaware	Cali Williams	18	Odessa	
District of Columbia	Sarah Eyasu	17	Clarksville, MD	
Florida	Keira Morehead	18	Windermere	
Georgia	Kalysia Negron	19	Atlanta	
Hawaii	Sabrina Calma	19	Lahaina	
Idaho	Drew Abdul-Wahab^{†}	19	Huntington Beach, CA	3rd runner-up at Miss California Teen USA 2025; Competed at Miss Arizona Teen USA 2025
Illinois	Sophia Xia	19	Deerfield	
Indiana	Kaelin Broad	17	Carmel	
Iowa	Charlotte Lange	18	Johnston	
Kansas	Emma Mayfield	18	Overland Park	
Kentucky	Reese Burt	19	Lexington	
Louisiana	Heaven Riley Breaux	17	Lafayette	
Maine	Jazmine Werner	17	Cumberland	
Maryland	Zoe Zuzak	18	Frostburg	Previously Miss Maryland's Teen 2024
Massachusetts	Elmire Arsenault	16	Fairhaven	
Michigan	Eliy Simmer	19	Clare	
Minnesota	Maisie Adams	17	North Oaks	Daughter of Miss North Dakota USA 1994 Amy Lantz
Mississippi	Madalyn Oliphant	19	Hickory	
Missouri	Mailyn Marsh	17	Ozark	Daughter of Miss Kansas USA 1999 and Miss Kansas Teen USA 1996 Amanda Carraway
Montana	Deanna Sophia Perdue^{†}	16	Saint Cloud, FL	Competed at Miss Florida Teen USA 2025
Nebraska	Kaitlyn Halvorsen	16	Lincoln	
Nevada	Cameron Reese	18	Las Vegas	
New Hampshire	Mia Dougherty^{†}	19	North Wildwood, NJ	Previously competed in Miss New Jersey's Teen (earning 1st runner up 3 consecutive years), having never competed in the Miss Teen USA state program
New Jersey	Océane Qian-Feuillat	19	Jersey City	
New Mexico	Ava Kincaid	19	Las Cruces	
New York	Ginger Ragaishis	19	New City	Previously Miss Vermont's Teen 2023; Top 11 semifinalist at Miss America Teen 2024
North Carolina	Caroline Holmes	17	Chattanooga, TN	
North Dakota	Sofia Console	19	Fargo	
Ohio	Helyna Park	17	Cleveland	
Oklahoma	Ruthie Richey	19	Norman	
Oregon	Isabel Fulmer^{†}	16	Covina, CA	4th runner-up at Miss California Teen USA 2024
Pennsylvania	Skylyn Goodenow	19	Harborcreek	
Rhode Island	Reyana Ahern	16	Warwick	
South Carolina	Leah Mary Scarmeas	17	Charleston	
South Dakota	Bella Puetz	19	Sioux Falls	
Tennessee	Aniston Leigh Barnette	17	Bristol	
Texas	Laika Kalyani Patel	17	Austin	
Utah	Lianna Beltre	(Note: Age disputed. Most sources Beltre's age was 20 at the time of competing)	Provo	
Vermont	Alaina Barlock^{†}	19	Pittsburgh, PA	2nd runner-up at Miss Ohio Teen USA 2025; 1st runner-up at Miss Pennsylvania Teen USA 2025; Also currently held a title of Miss Charming Teen 2025
Virginia	Emma McReynolds	18	Coeburn	
Washington	Maliyah Van Hook^{†}	18	Gilroy, CA	First runner-up at the Teen division on United World Pageant 2025, having never competed in the Miss Teen USA state program
West Virginia	Baylee Jarret	19	Richwood	
Wisconsin	Autumn Gunderson	17	DeForest	
Wyoming	Addison Hollensworth^{†}	19	Little Rock, AR	Previously Miss Arkansas Teen Volunteer 2025; 1st runner-up at Miss Arkansas Teen USA 2025; 1st runner-up at Miss Alabama Teen USA 2025

† The chosen delegate was appointed from an Open Casting Call
