= Miss Teen USA 2026 =

- Date: August 26, 2026
- Presenters: Sean Michael Rae; Noelia Voigt
- Venue: Adrienne Arsht Center for the Performing Arts, Miami, Florida
- Broadcaster: Queen Beauty Network
- Entrants: 51
- Placements: 20
- Winner: Kiran Reddy; Georgia
- Congeniality: Jasmine Jerke, South Dakota
- Best State Costume: Alana Dixon, Tennessee
- Photogenic: Maggie Peterson, Connecticut

Miss Teen USA 2026 was the 44th Miss Teen USA pageant, held at the Adrienne Arsht Center for the Performing Arts in Miami, Florida on August 26, 2026.

Mailyn Marsh of Missouri crowned Kiran Reddy of Georgia as her successor at the end of the event, marking the first title for the state in the pageant's history. She represented the United States at Miss Teen Universe 2026 which took place on 25th of October in Phnom Penh, Cambodia. and placed as 4th Runner-up

== Background ==
=== Location ===
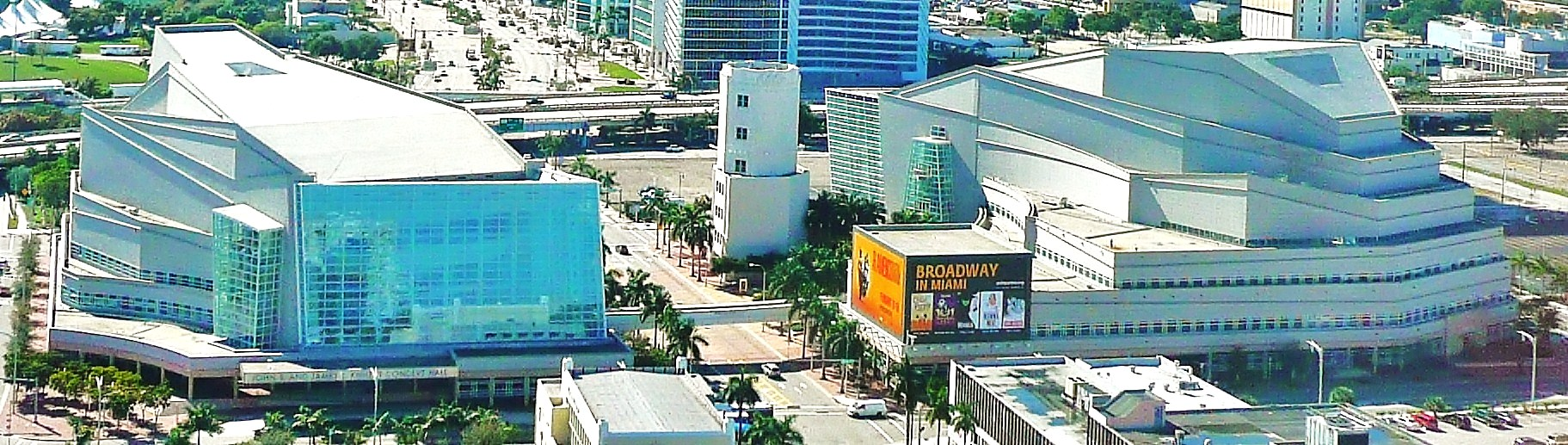
Adrienne Arsht Center for the Performing Arts, venue of the pageant

On March 5, 2026 it was announced that the competition will take place in Miami, Florida. A month later, it was announced the venue will be held at Adrienne Arsht Center for the Performing Arts.

=== Broadcaster ===
On June 23, 2026, it was announced the pageant was originally to be aired on The CW on what would be its third time in four years after having previously signed a three-year deal in 2024. However, on August 20, a week before the pageant, The CW pulled off from the schedule along with concurrent Miss USA pageant in favor for the Queen Beauty Network streaming platform for its second consecutive year and still scheduled as planned.

=== Selection of contestants ===
The selection of contestants for the state pageants taking place in May to July 2026. The first state pageant was Arkansas and held on May 3, 2026 the final state pageant is the tri-states of Maryland, New Jersey, and New York, scheduled to be held on July 26, 2026.

=== Appointed contestants ===
As with the previous year, several states in the competition can not hold traditional state pageants due to state directorship contract issues and will get via an open casting call conducting by the national organization. On May 15, 2026, it was announced sixteen states will give an open casting call with applications in separate parts.

The first Open Call began voting in early June and those states are Georgia, Idaho, Kentucky, New Hampshire, Pennsylvania, Tennessee, Texas, and Vermont into three voting rounds each, the top two on each assigned group from the final voting round would make it to the judges round upon submitting their videos determining those hopefuls would select the eight women to appoint each of the eight state titles. The second Open call for the remaining eight states began voting at the end of June with the "Redemption Round" twist to have most of first batch eliminated hopefuls would have got a second chance, with new hopefuls will begin voting in mid-July; those states are Colorado, Michigan, Mississippi, Montana, Ohio, Oregon, Washington, and Wyoming with the same format.

== Results ==
External videos
- Miss Teen USA 2026 Finals
- MISS TEEN USA 2026 - FINAL COMPETITION by Miss Teen USA

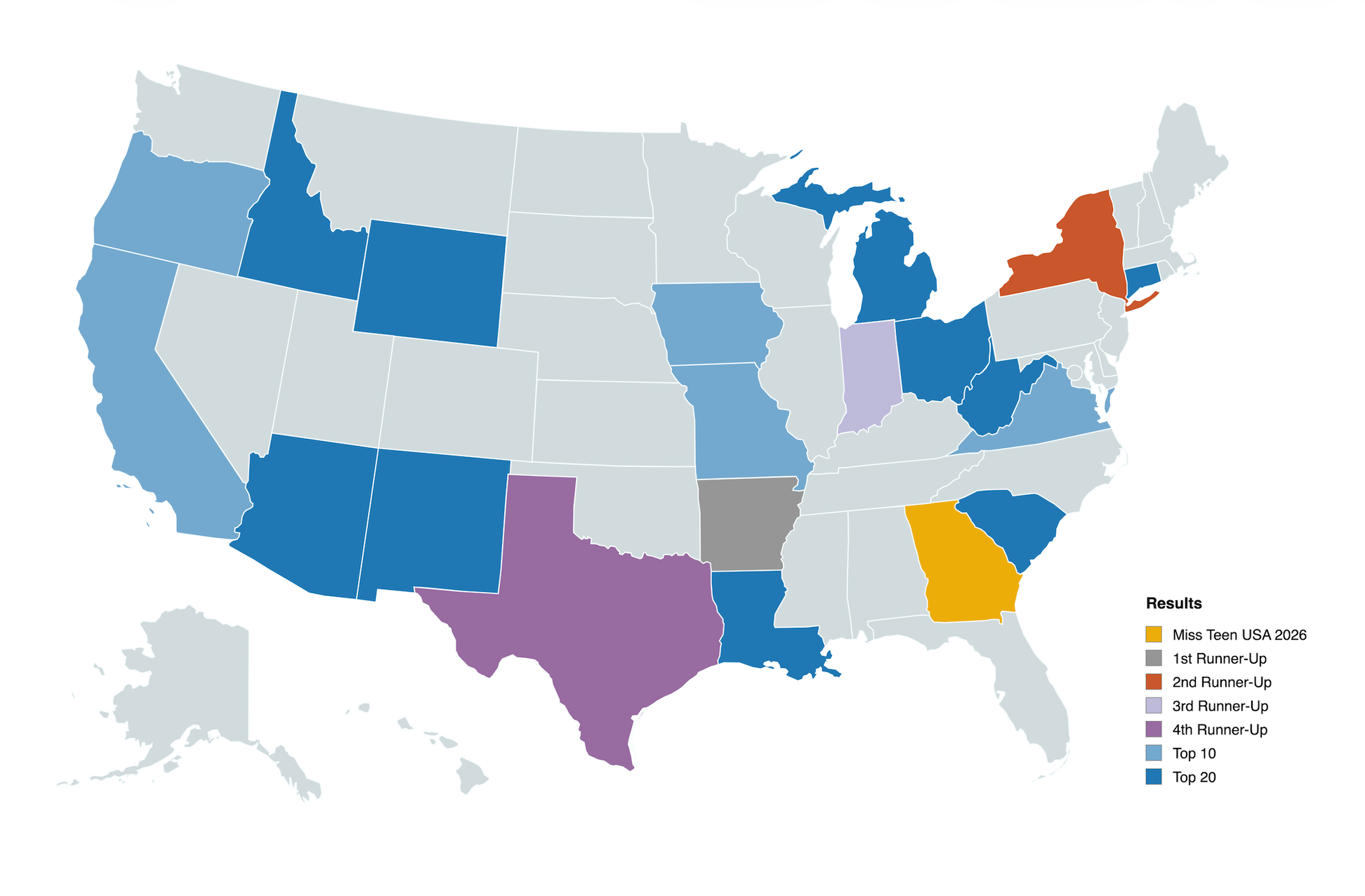
Miss Teen USA 2026 results.

=== Placements ===
Placement	Contestant
Miss Teen USA 2026	Georgia – Kiran Reddy
1st Runner-Up	Arkansas – Raquel Olea
2nd Runner-Up	New York – Elisa Akin
3rd Runner-Up	Indiana – Kiersten Alvarado
4th Runner-Up	Texas – Chloe Bella Dietz
Top 10	California – Ava Grace Nichols; Iowa – Avery Bradley; Missouri – Vegas Turner; Oregon – Reagan Strazzeri; Virginia – Madyson Blizzard ^{§}
Top 20	Arizona – Ella Hansen; Connecticut – Maggie Peterson; Idaho – Shayleena Wijerathna; Louisiana – Kadie Sumbler ^{§}; Michigan – Mia Vanessa Prom; New Mexico – Olivia Biggs; Ohio – Emma Fossum; South Carolina – Isabella Brandt ^{§}; West Virginia – Gracia Knight; Wyoming – Joie Kennedy

§ Voted into the Top 20 by viewers

=== Special awards ===
Award	Contestant
Preliminary Best in Fitness & Activewear	Indiana – Kiersten Alvarado
Best in Interview	Oregon – Reagan Strazzeri
Best in State Costume	Tennessee – Alana Dixon
Miss Teen FLIXXE	Wisconsin – Leia Rios
People's Choice	Louisiana – Kadie Sumbler
Miss Photogenic	Connecticut – Maggie Peterson
Miss Congeniality	South Dakota – Jasmine Jerke

== Pageant ==
=== Judges ===
- Kelsey Swanson — The Real Housewives of Rhode Island star and Miss Rhode Island USA 2017
- Kylan Darnell — Miss Ohio Teen USA 2022 and Miss Teen USA 2022 Top 16 finalist
- Kiʻilani Arruda — Miss Teen USA 2020 from Hawaii
- Kaliegh Garris — Miss Teen USA 2019 from Connecticut
- Marie P. Anderson — owner of Boss Babe Models
- Bessie Besana — Fashion designer and founder of the luxury brand Bessie Besana

== Contestants ==
As of July 2026, the confirmed contestants are competing for the title.

State/District	Contestant	Hometown	Notes
Alabama	Raiah Jolyn Dona	Montgomery	
Alaska	Allison Kirksey	Anchorage	
Arizona	Ella Hansen	Tempe	
Arkansas	Raquel Olea	Maysville	
California	Ava Grace Nichols	La Jolla	
Colorado	Sophia Cespedes^{†}	Brighton	
Connecticut	Maggie Peterson	Hartford	
Delaware	Sydney Hayden	Newark	
(Washington, D.C.) District of Columbia	Blake Hart	Washington, D.C.	Previously Miss District of Columbia's Teen 2025; 4th runner-up at Miss America's Teen 2026
Florida	Sarah Duncan	Crystal River	
(Georgia (U.S. state)) Georgia	Kiran Reddy^{†}	Douglas	
Hawaii	Olivia Tom	Maui	
Idaho	Shayleena Wijerathna^{†}	Corona, CA	
Illinois	Scarlet Mcllrath	Bureau	
Indiana	Kiersten Alvarado	Indianapolis	
Iowa	Avery Bradley	Muscatine	Previously Miss Iowa's Teen 2024; Top 11 & Preliminary Fitness Winner at Miss America's Teen 2025
Kansas	Dia Kearney	Wichita	
Kentucky	Taylor Moore^{†}	Louisville	
Louisiana	Kadie Sumbler	Baton Rouge	
Maine	Sadie Coffey	Ogunquit	
Maryland	Sophie Pittman	Baltimore	
Massachusetts	Brooke Goodrich	Oxford	
Michigan	Mia Vanessa Prom^{†}	Tampa, FL	2nd runner-up at Miss Florida Teen USA 2026
Minnesota	Mya Gierman	Rogers	
Mississippi	Mykala Donlon^{†}	Charleston, SC	1st runner-up at Miss South Carolina Teen USA 2026
Missouri	Vegas Turner	Springfield	
Montana	Rowan Cross^{†}	Glendale, AZ	Daughter of Shellene Cockrell Miss Colorado 1994; 3rd runner-up at Miss Arizona's Teen 2026
Nebraska	Brynlee Hansen	Bennington	
Nevada	Ashley Salgado	Las Vegas	
New Hampshire	Peyton Esp^{†}	Gurnee	
New Jersey	Makenna Wayman	Newark	
New Mexico	Olivia Biggs	White Sands	
(New York (state)) New York	Elisa Akin	New York City	
North Carolina	Trinity Locklear	Lumberton	
North Dakota	Audrey Emerson	Fargo	
Ohio	Emma Fossum^{†}	Dallas, TX	Previously Miss Texas' Teen 2025; 2nd runner-up at Miss America's Teen 2026; Semi-finalist at Miss Texas Teen USA 2024
Oklahoma	Chloe Braxton	Tulsa	
Oregon	Reagan Strazzeri^{†}	Marina del Rey, CA	Semi-finalist, Miss Congeniality, and Miss Photogenic at Miss California Teen USA 2025
Pennsylvania	Alheyda Guerra^{†}	Laredo, TX	
Rhode Island	Sienna Tandon	Johnston	
South Carolina	Isabella Brandt	Charleston	
South Dakota	Jasmine Jerke	Sioux Falls	
Tennessee	Alana Dixon^{†}	DeSoto, TX	
Texas	Chloe Bella Dietz^{†}	Tomball	Previously Miss Texas High School America 2025; 2nd Runner-Up at Miss High School America 2025
Utah	Maizy Baldwin	St. George	
Vermont	Payton Givens^{†}	Houston, TX	
Virginia	Madyson Blizzard	Purcellville	
(Washington (state)) Washington	Bella Seeden^{†}	Temecula, CA	1st runner-up at Miss California Teen USA 2026
West Virginia	Gracia Knight	Bridgeport	
Wisconsin	Leia Rios	Brookfield	
Wyoming	Joie Kennedy^{†}	Niwot, CO	Semi-finalist & Miss Photogenic at Miss Colorado Teen USA 2024; 1st runner-up at Miss Colorado's Teen 2024; 3rd runner-up at Miss Colorado's Teen 2026

† The chosen delegate was appointed from an Open Casting Call
