= Miss Mississippi Teen USA =

Beauty pageant competition

- Formation: 1983
- Type: Beauty pageant
- Headquarters: Collierville
- Location: Tennessee
- Members: Miss Teen USA
- Official language: English
- Key people: Kim Greenwood, State Pageant Director
- Website: Official Website

The Miss Mississippi Teen USA competition is the pageant that selects the representative for the state of Mississippi in the Miss Teen USA pageant. The pageant was directed by Premier Pageants from 2001 to 2010, before becoming part of Greenwood Productions in 2010 under the ownership of Miss Tennessee USA 1989 Kim Greenwood.

Mississippi has two Miss Teen USA, one in 1987 becoming the 5th state that won the Miss Teen USA title for the first time, and most recent in 2024 with Addie Carver. Eight titleholders have competed at Miss USA and one at Miss America as Miss Tennessee.

Mykala Donlon of Charleston was appointed Miss Mississippi Teen USA on July 30, 2026 after the open casting call from Thomas Brodeur, the new owner of the national pageant. She will represent Mississippi at Miss Teen USA 2026.

== Results summary ==
=== Placements ===
- Miss Teen USAs: Kristi Addis (1987), Addie Carver (2024)
- 1st runner-up: Vaeda Mann (2014)
- 3rd runner-up: Kaylee Brooke McCollum (2019)
- 4th runner-up: Haley Sowers (2010)
- Top 10: Honey East (1988), Jennifer Reel (1998)
- Top 12: Arleen McDonald (1992), Angie Carpenter (1994)
- Top 16: Mattie Grace Morris (2021)

Mississippi holds a record of 10 placements at Miss Teen USA.

=== Awards ===
- Miss Congeniality: Chelle Wilson (1985), Anne Elise Parks (2007), Elizabeth Hollomon (2008)

== Winners ==
- Declared as Winner
- Ended as runner-up
- Ended as one of the finalists or semifinalists

| Year | Name | Hometown | Age^{1} | Local title | Placement at MTUSA | Special awards at MTUSA | Notes |
|---|---|---|---|---|---|---|---|
| 2026 | Mykala Donlon | Charleston, SC | 18 | Miss Charleston Teen | | | 1st runner-up at Miss South Carolina Teen USA 2026 |
| 2025 | Madalyn Oliphant | Hickory | 19 | Miss East Central Teen | | | First African-American to win title |
| 2024 | Addie Carver | Monticello | 17 | Miss Spirit of Volunteer Teen | Miss Teen USA 2024 | | |
| 2023 | Claire Ulmer | Natchez | 18 | Miss MS Volunteer Teen | | | |
| 2022 | McKenzie Cole | Vicksburg | 15 | Miss Vicksburg Teen | | | Later Miss Mississippi USA 2025 |
| 2021 | Mattie Grace Morris | Flowood | 17 | Miss Rankin County Teen | Top 16 | | Later Miss Mississippi Volunteer 2026; 1st runner-up at Miss Volunteer America 2027 |
| 2020 | Zoe Bigham | Louisville | 17 | Miss Louisville Teen | | | |
| 2019 | Kaylee Brooke McCollum | Amory | 18 | Miss Monroe Co. Teen | 3rd runner-up | | Later Miss Mississippi USA 2024; Top 20 at Miss USA 2024 |
| 2018 | Julieanna Jackson | Mize | 15 | Miss Mize Teen | | | Former 2014 International Junior Miss Pre-teen |
| 2017 | Hannah Claire Chisolm | Collinsville | 17 | Miss Lauderdale Co. Teen | | | |
| 2016 | Lauren Rymer | Natchez | 17 | Miss Natchez Teen | | | |
| 2015 | Andrea Davidson Hightower | Oxford | 17 | Miss Oxford Teen | | | |
| 2014 | Vaeda Mann | Hattiesburg | 16 | Miss Aok Grove Teen | 1st runner-up | | |
| 2013 | Madison Brock | Crystal Springs | 17 | Miss Copiah Co. Teen | | | |
| 2012 | Jessica Carter | Petal | 18 | Miss Perry County Teen | | | |
| 2011 | Sarah Bobo | Corinth | 19 | Miss Crossroad Teen | | | |
| 2010 | Haley Brooke Sowers | Collinsville | 16 | | 4th runner-up | | Later Miss Mississippi USA 2016 |
| 2009 | Paromita Mitra | Hattiesburg | 17 | | | | Later Miss Mississippi USA 2013 |
| 2008 | Elizabeth Hollomon | Madison | 18 | | | Miss Congeniality | |
| 2007 | Anne Elise Parks | New Albany | 18 | | | Miss Congeniality | |
| 2006 | Raegan Raulston | Clinton | 17 | | | | |
| 2005 | Kathleen Williams | Columbus | 18 | | | | |
| 2004 | Jessica McRaney | Byram | 18 | | | | Later Miss Mississippi USA 2009 |
| 2003 | Krisi Nash | Amory | 18 | | | | |
| 2002 | Grace Gore | Grenada | 18 | | | | Later Miss Tennessee 2007; Top 16 at Miss America 2008 |
| 2001 | Ashley Buckman | Bay Springs | 17 | | | | |
| 2000 | Jennifer Duke | Pearl | 18 | | | | |
| 1999 | Allison Bloodworth | Grenada | 18 | | | | Later Miss Mississippi USA 2003 |
| 1998 | Jennifer Reel | Olive Branch | 17 | | Semi-finalist | | |
| 1997 | Cara Lewis | Heidelberg | 17 | | | | |
| 1996 | Brandee Loving | Southaven | 18 | | | | |
| 1995 | Merideth Cash | Biloxi | 17 | | | | |
| 1994 | Angie Carpenter | Lexington | 17 | | Semi-finalist | | Later Miss Mississippi USA 2000 |
| 1993 | Bridgette Cain | Jackson | 18 | | | | |
| 1992 | Arleen McDonald | Tupelo | 17 | | Semi-finalist | | Later Miss Mississippi USA 1997 |
| 1991 | Jimmy Ann Glenn | Amory | 17 | | | | |
| 1990 | Kim Faulkner | Jackson | 18 | | | | |
| 1989 | Valerie Bea "Vallie" Penn | Clinton | 18 | | | | |
| 1988 | Ella-Marie "Honey" East | Jackson | 16 | | Semi-finalist | | |
| 1987 | Kristi Lyn Addis | Holcomb | 16 | | Miss Teen USA 1987 | | |
| 1986 | Michele Elaine Fouche | Jackson | 17 | | | | |
| 1985 | Chelle Wilson | Water Valley | 17 | | | Miss Congeniality | |
| 1984 | Mona Bryant | Gulfport | 17 | | | | |
| 1983 | Laura Teresa Zepponi | Leland | 16 | | | | |

^{1} Age at the time of the Miss Teen USA pageant
