= Miss New Hampshire Teen USA =

Beauty pageant competition

- Formation: 1983
- Type: Beauty pageant
- Headquarters: Malden
- Location: Massachusetts
- Members: Miss Teen USA
- Official language: English
- Website: Official Website

The Miss New Hampshire Teen USA competition is the pageant that selects the representative for the state of New Hampshire in the Miss Teen USA pageant. It was directed by The Clemente Organization based in Malden, Massachusetts from 2013 to 2019. GDB Theatre and Pageant Productions became the new directors for the event starting from 2020 competition.

In terms of number of placements, New Hampshire is one of the least successful states. From 1983 to 2007 their only placement was when Janel Bishop won the Miss Teen USA title in 1991. It then became the 8th state that won the Miss Teen USA title for the first time.

Three New Hampshire teens have competed at Miss USA, two after winning the Miss New Hampshire USA and one as Miss New York USA.

Peyton Esp of Gurnee was appointed Miss New Hampshire Teen USA on June 30th, 2026 after the open casting call from Thomas Brodeur, the new owner of the national pageant. She will represent New Hampshire at Miss Teen USA 2026.

== Results summary ==
=== Placements ===
- Miss Teen USA: Janel Bishop (1991)
- Top 15/20: Courtney Morgan (2008), Mia Dougherty (2025)

New Hampshire holds a record of 3 placements at Miss Teen USA.

== Winners ==
- Declared as Winner
- Ended as runner-up
- Ended as one of the finalists or semifinalists

| Year | Name | Hometown | Age^{1} | Local title | Placement at Miss Teen USA | Special awards at Miss Teen USA | Notes |
|---|---|---|---|---|---|---|---|
| 2026 | Peyton Esp | Gurnee, IL | 19 | Miss Gurnee Teen | | | |
| 2025 | Mia Dougherty | North Wildwood, NJ | 19 | | Top 20 | | |
| 2024 | Tara Marshall | Hanover | 17 | | | | Runner-Up at Miss Universe Thailand 2025 |
| 2023 | Marayssa Raimondo | Dover | 18 | Miss Dover Teen | | | |
| 2022 | Grace Paradise | Plaistow | 17 | Miss Plaistow Teen | | | Later Miss Aura USA 2026; Top 21 at Miss Aura International 2026 & Best in Evening Gown Winner |
| 2021 | Emilee Mills | Concord | 19 | | | | Daughter of Stephanie Foisy Mills, Miss New Hampshire 1995 |
| 2020 | Samantha Lemay | Deerfield | 16 | | | | |
| 2019 | Jadyn McDonough | Bedford | 18 | | | | |
| 2018 | Natalie Jenkins | Nashua | 17 | | | | |
| 2017 | Kolby Tracey | Amherst | 18 | | | | |
| 2016 | Valeria Podobniy | Amherst | 17 | | | | |
| 2015 | Eleanor Lathram | Manchester | 16 | | | | |
| 2014 | Mikaela Seamans | Keene | 17 | | | | |
| 2013 | Kelsea Campbell | Auburn | 17 | Miss Auburn Teen | | | |
| 2012 | Marisa DeLuca | Windham | 18 | Miss Windham Teen | | | |
| 2011 | Annie Read | Sandwich | 17 | | | | |
| 2010 | Morgan Lucas | Manchester | 18 | | | | |
| 2009 | Amber Faucher | Pelham | 17 | | | | Later Miss New Hampshire USA 2013 |
| 2008 | Courtney Morgan | Manchester | 18 | | Top 15 | | |
| 2007 | Alexandra MacDonald | Gilford | 18 | | | | |
| 2006 | Camille Westbrooks | Salem | 18 | | | | Miss Petite Teen New Hampshire 2004, Miss Sunburst USA 2005 |
| 2005 | Brittany Dube | Hampstead | 15 | | | | |
| 2004 | Brittany Freeman | Merrimack | 16 | | | | Cheerleader for the Miami Dolphins; Daughter of Miss New Hampshire USA 1977 & Miss New Hampshire 1978- Belinda Bridgeman |
| 2003 | Marshele Lee | Manchester | 16 | | | | |
| 2002 | Jennifer Stein | Manchester | 18 | | | | |
| 2001 | Ashley Blair | Manchester | 15 | | | | |
| 2000 | Kristen O'Neil | Manchester | 17 | | | | Cheerleader for the New England Patriots |
| 1999 | Kristin Thurston | Manchester | 17 | | | | |
| 1998 | Nadiyah Humber | Salem | 16 | | | | |
| 1997 | Bonnie Gagnon | Manchester | 18 | | | | |
| 1996 | Melissa Coish | Manchester | 16 | | | | |
| 1995 | Denise Courtney Hill | Manchester | 16 | | | | |
| 1994 | Keri Lynn Pratt | Derry | 16 | | | | Television and movie actress. |
| 1993 | Gretchen Durgin | Lancaster | 17 | | | | Later Miss New Hampshire USA 1997 |
| 1992 | Angela Etter | Gorham | 15 | | | | |
| 1991 | Janel Bishop | Manchester | 17 | | Miss Teen USA 1991 | | |
| 1990 | Sarah McFall | Manchester | 16 | | | | |
| 1989 | Kerri Sossei | Londonderry | 15 | | | | |
| 1988 | Christa Jones | Keene | 17 | | | | |
| 1987 | Cara Daras | Nashua | 17 | | | | |
| 1986 | Diane Dothan | Rochester | 17 | | | | |
| 1985 | Katherine Borski | Londonderry | 16 | | | | |
| 1984 | Lisa Fernald | Hampton | 15 | | | | |
| 1983 | Maureen Murray | Merrimack | 17 | | | | Later Miss New York USA 1991, finished 7th at Miss USA 1991 |

^{1} Age at the time of the Miss Teen USA pageant
