= Attack of the 50 Foot Cheerleader =

- Theatrical release poster
- Directed by: Kevin O'Neill
- Written by: Mike MacLean
- Produced by: Roger Corman; Dan Golden
- Starring: Jena Sims; Sean Young; Ryan Merriman; Olivia Alexander; Treat Williams; Sasha Jackson; Ted Raimi
- Edited by: Yasmin Assemi; Vikram Kale
- Production company: New Horizon Pictures
- Distributed by: Epix
- Release date: August 25, 2012
- Running time: 90 minutes
- Country: United States
- Language: English
- Budget: $1 million

Attack of the 50 Foot Cheerleader is a 2012 American 3D science fiction comedy horror film directed by Kevin O'Neill and produced by Roger Corman as his first 3D production. The film stars Treat Williams, Sean Young, Olivia Alexander and Jena Sims. The film was released on August 25, 2012, on Epix.

== Plot ==
Cassie Stratford is a plain science nerd, whose mother was captain of the cheer squad at Iron Coast University and president of Zeta Mu Sorority, so she is pressured to join both cheerleading and the sorority. However, Brittany Andrews, current Zeta President and Cheer Captain rejects her.

Cassie works in the Biology Building of the University, where she and her friend Kyle are working on a drug called Renew that turns things beautiful. In the night, Cassie steals the drug and injects herself with it. While she does become beautiful and makes the cheer squad when one of the cheerleaders is injured, she then discovers the drug has a side effect when she starts to grow bigger and bigger until she is a giantess.

Brittany discovers this and tries to seduce Kyle into telling her the secret, which leads to her being accidentally injected with a double dose of the drug and also growing into a giantess. Learning of what happened to Brittany, Cassie declines being injected with the antidote, choosing to confront her at the university stadium, leading to a catfight. During the fight, Brittany grows into a bigger giantess size, but Kyle manages to distract her with a large taser, allowing Cassie to inject Brittany with a drug overdose of the antidote before knocking her out. Kyle then injects Cassie with the antidote and she is returned to normal. While Cassie and Kyle kiss, Brittany is shrunken to dwarf size due to the overdose and is made fun of by her fellow cheerleaders.

== Cast ==
- Jena Sims as Cassie Stratford
- Sean Young as Brenda Stratford
- Treat Williams as Mr. Gray
- Sasha Jackson as Jett
- Olivia Alexander as Brittany Andrews
- Ryan Merriman as Kyle
- Ted Raimi as Dr. Higgs
- Anne McDaniels as Tiff
- Mary Woronov as House Mother
- Paula Trickey as Ex-Cheerleader
- AJ Lamas as Brandon
- Brent Huff as Announcer
- John Landis as Professor White
- Roger Corman as Dean Hinkle
- Ariana Madix as Pledge #2

== Production ==
Roger Corman stated that for each of the 350+ films he's produced, he has worked efficiently and planned them in advance. He told the Toronto Star that he hoped to premiere the film at Comic-Con in July 2012. In a compliment he paid to the actress Sean Young, Corman told her, "Sean, you were great in the picture but you were miscast. You look too good to be the mother!" This was Corman's first 3D production. The actress in the title role, Jena Sims, was crowned Miss Georgia Teen USA 2007.

During filming, both Sims and Olivia Alexander heavily promoted the film, sharing behind the scenes photos with fans on Twitter and videos on YouTube. Sims and Alexander even accompanied Roger Corman at Comic-Con while wearing their giant cheerleader outfits and also accompanied Corman at the 85th Academy Awards.

The movie was featured in the 2013 book Crab Monsters, Teenage Cavemen, and Candy Stripe Nurses: Roger Corman: King of the B Movie by author Chris Nashawaty.

The song "Attack Attack", sung by Olivia Alexander, is featured during the opening credits of the film. Alexander wrote and sang three songs for the film: "Attack Attack", "It's On" and "VIP." A music video for "It's On" was filmed on August 9, 2012, and is available on Alexander's YouTube channel.

== Release ==
The film premiered at San Diego Comic-Con on July 14, 2012. It also screened at the 3D Film Festival on September 22, 2012. It was formally released on August 25, 2012, on Epix.

Lionsgate released the film on DVD in 2015 with no special features. There are currently no plans for a Blu-ray release.
