= Kathryn Fiore =

American actress and comedian

- Born: 1975 or 1976 (age 50–51)
- Occupations: Actress; voice actress; comedian
- Years active: 1994–present
- Spouse: Gabriel Tigerman
- Children: 1
- Website: katfiore.com

Kathryn Fiore (born 1975 or 1976) is an American actress, voice actress and comedian. She has played numerous roles in TV and film as well as her voice work in video games, film, and TV. She is most known for her work on the comedy sketch show, MADtv and for playing Ingrid on the TV show, Wedding Band.

== Career ==
Fiore began her career with a part in the film, Cousin Howard.

From 2001 until 2002, she played various roles on the comedy sketch show, MadTV. Through the years, Fiore has had numerous roles in TV and film as well as voice work in video games, film, and TV.

During the 2012-2013 season, she played Ingrid on the TV show, Wedding Band.

== Personal life ==
She dated fellow voice actor Rino Romano in 1999. She is married to fellow actor Gabriel Tigerman.

In 2013, Fiore suffered organ failure after an emergency cesarean section while giving birth to her first child, a daughter named Alice. Fiore was stabilized after undergoing life-saving procedures, including emergency dialysis.

In 2020, Fiore made accusations that she was raped by comedian/actor (and fellow MADtv alumnus) Bryan Callen in 1999.

== Filmography ==
=== Film ===
| Year | Title | Role | Notes |
|---|---|---|---|
| 1995 | Cousin Howard | Bridget | |
| 2005 | Tom and Jerry: Blast Off to Mars | Peep, Press Girl (voice) | Direct-to-video |
| 2006 | Mission: Impossible III | Party Goer | |
| 2006 | The Iron Man | Nikki | |
| 2007 | Reno 911! Miami | Cheyenne the Helicopter Model | |
| 2008 | The Hottie and the Nottie | Jane | |
| 2008 | Necessary Evil | Deborah Fielding | |
| 2010 | Hatchet II | Shyann Crowley | |
| 2013 | 30 Nights of Paranormal Activity with the Devil Inside the Girl with the Dragon Tattoo | Dana | |

=== Television ===
| Year | Title | Role | Notes |
|---|---|---|---|
| 1999 | Student Affairs | Amy | Television film |
| 2000 | Strong Medicine | | Episode: "Pre-Existing Conditions" |
| 2001–2002 | MADtv | Various | Season 7 |
| 2001–2002 | Invader Zim | Various voices | 3 episodes |
| 2001–2004 | The Powerpuff Girls | Additional voices | 20 episodes |
| 2003 | Charmed | Elizabeth | Episode: "My Three Witches" |
| 2004–2005 | Reno 911! | Hippie Girl, Peace Corps Rep | 2 episodes |
| 2006 | Jake in Progress | Debra | Episode: "Eyebrow Girl vs. Smirkface" |
| 2008 | The Batman | Sally Galt | Episode: "The End of the Batman" |
| 2011 | Good Luck Charlie | Rain | Episode: "PJ In The City" |

=== Video games ===
| Year | Title | Role | Notes |
|---|---|---|---|
| 2000 | Spider-Man | Screaming Woman, Female Police Pilot | Uncredited |
| 2001 | Spider-Man 2: Enter Electro | Various voices | |
| 2004 | EverQuest II | Various voices | |
| 2006 | Metal Gear Ac!d 2 | Venus | |
| 2006 | Metal Gear Solid: Portable Ops | Venus | |
| 2007 | No More Heroes | Bad Girl | |
| 2019 | Travis Strikes Again: No More Heroes | Bad Girl | |
| 2021 | No More Heroes III | Bad Girl | |

=== Other ===
- Various Commercials for ABC Family, FX, and Lifetime Network
- The Powerpuff Girls Rule (2008) - Additional voices

=== Characters ===
- Katie Williams (Embarrassing Parents)
- Taylor Rosenblatt (Sorority Row: Kappa Kappa Kappa)

=== Impressions ===
- Alyssa Milano
- Amber Valletta
- Barbara Bush
- Barbara Eden (as her character Jeannie from I Dream of Jeannie)
- Jessica Biel (as Mary Camden from 7th Heaven)
- Kate Beckinsale
- Lynne Koplitz
- Mandy Moore
- Mary-Kate and Ashley Olsen
- Sarah Michelle Gellar
