= Miss Teen USA 1995 =

13th edition of the Miss Teen USA competition

- Date: August 15, 1995
- Presenters: Bob Goen; Maty Monfort
- Entertainment: All-4-One
- Venue: Century II Convention Center, Wichita, Kansas
- Broadcaster: CBS; KWCH-TV
- Entrants: 51
- Placements: 12
- Winner: Keylee Sue Sanders; Kansas
- Congeniality: Shelly Forest; Oklahoma
- Photogenic: Lynnette Cole; Tennessee

Miss Teen USA 1995, the 13th Miss Teen USA pageant, was televised live from the Century II Convention Center in Wichita, Kansas on 15 August 1995. At the conclusion of the final competition, Keylee Sue Sanders of Kansas was crowned by outgoing queen Shauna Gambill of California.

The pageant was hosted by Bob Goen for the second year, with color commentary by Maty Monfort and entertainment by All-4-One. This was the only year that the pageant was held in Wichita, which also held the Miss USA pageant from 1990 to 1994, and it was the first time that a delegate won the Miss Teen USA title in her home state.

== Delegates ==
The Miss Teen USA 1995 delegates were:

- Alabama - Jennifer Otts
- Alaska - Heather Evans
- Arizona - Brandy Leigh Campbell
- Arkansas - Natalie Fisher
- California - Kellie Foster Moore
- Colorado - Melissa Schuster
- Connecticut - Tiffany-Anne Kosma
- Delaware - Dawn Renee Huey
- District of Columbia - Michelle Wright
- Florida - Corinna Clark
- Georgia - Gillian Nicholson
- Hawaii - Sara Kirby
- Idaho - Amy Jo Ambrose
- Illinois - Anne-Marie Dixon
- Indiana - Sarah McClary
- Iowa - Chelsey Ridge
- Kansas - Keylee Sue Sanders
- Kentucky - Brittany Johnson
- Louisiana - Shawn Elizabeth Price
- Maine - Kathryn "Katie" Aselton
- Maryland - Jennifer Ritz
- Massachusetts - Erika Ewald
- Michigan - Kathleen McConnell
- Minnesota - Michelle Borg
- Mississippi - Meredith Joy Cash
- Missouri - Melana Scantlin
- Montana - Christi Hanson
- Nebraska - Marlo McVea
- Nevada - Alicia Carnes
- New Hampshire - Denise Courtney Hill
- New Jersey - Joyce Houseknecht
- New Mexico - Shelby Phillips
- New York - Tara Campbell
- North Carolina - Meredith Jackson
- North Dakota - Jessica Spier
- Ohio - Amber Vaughan
- Oklahoma - Shelly Forrest
- Oregon - Kirra O'Brien
- Pennsylvania - Erika Lynn Shay
- Rhode Island - Carol Pedrosa
- South Carolina - Gariane Phillips
- South Dakota - Marty Eaton
- Tennessee - Lynnette Cole
- Texas - Mandy Jeffreys
- Utah - Loni Sorden
- Vermont - Melissa Perron
- Virginia - Kristel Jenkins
- Washington - Summer Springer
- West Virginia - Sarah Russell
- Wisconsin - Rebecca Rowe
- Wyoming - Erica Lynn Williams

== Judges ==
- Lisa Akey - actress
- Allison Brown Young - Miss Teen USA 1986 from Oklahoma
- Clarence Gilyard - actor
- Brian McNamara - actor
- Adam Oates - ice hockey player
- Lisa Santos - literary agent
- Raphael Sbarge - actor
- David Sidoni - actor
- Laurin Sydney - television anchorwoman
