= Jillian Parry Fry =

American model (born 1982)

- Born: January 31, 1982 (age 44); Newtown, Pennsylvania, U.S.
- Education: Ph.D. Johns Hopkins University, 2012; M.P.H. University of New Mexico, 2007; B.S. Penn State University, 2004
- Occupation: Public health scientist
- Title: Miss Teen USA 2000

Jillian Parry (born January 31, 1982) is an American model and beauty queen who won Miss Teen USA 2000, representing her home town of Newtown and state of Pennsylvania. She was the first titleholder from Pennsylvania to win the national competition.

Parry entered the Miss Pennsylvania Teen USA pageant on a whim, after a postcard was dropped in her mail, and won on her first attempt.

While a freshman at Pennsylvania State University Parry represented Pennsylvania at the Miss Teen USA pageant televised live from Shreveport, Louisiana on August 26, 2000. She won the pageant and was crowned Miss Teen USA 2000 by Ashley Coleman of Delaware, Miss Teen USA 1999. For her win she received more than $150,000 in cash and prizes.

As Miss Teen USA, Parry represented the Miss Universe Organization making appearances throughout the United States. Her "sister" 2000 titleholders were Lynnette Cole (Miss USA, from Tennessee) and Lara Dutta (Miss Universe, of India). She passed her title on to her successor, Marissa Whitley of Missouri, on August 22, 2001.

As Miss Teen USA Parry appeared in a Mothers Against Drunk Driving campaign that released after she gave up her title.

== Personal life ==
Parry has been a vegan since 2002, and she is an active public health scientist in the field of environmental health policy.
