= Miss Pennsylvania Teen USA =

Beauty pageant competition

- Formation: 1983
- Type: Beauty pageant
- Headquarters: Cincinnati
- Location: Ohio
- Members: Miss Teen USA
- Official language: English
- Key people: Melissa Proctor-Pitchford, State Pageant Director
- Website: Official website

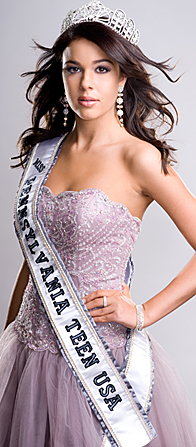
Alexis Jahnke, Miss Pennsylvania Teen USA 2009

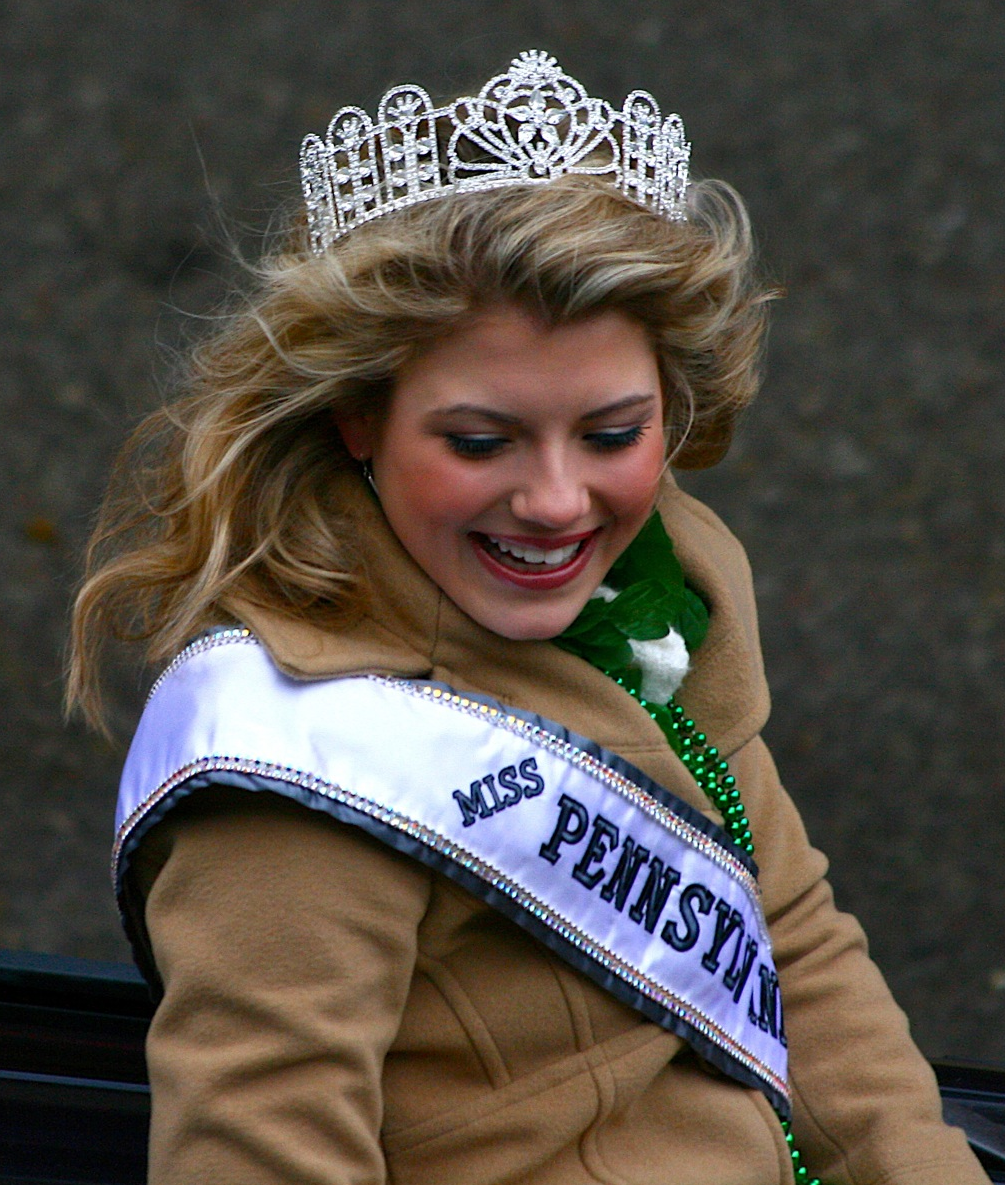
Kelsie Sinagra, Miss Pennsylvania Teen USA 2007

The Miss Pennsylvania Teen USA competition is the pageant that selects the representative for the state of Pennsylvania in the Miss Teen USA pageant. This pageant is independently conducted and produced by Proctor Productions based in Cincinnati, Ohio. It was produced by Sanders & Associates, Inc., dba- Pageant Associates based in Buckhannon, West Virginia from 2001 to 2020.

Pennsylvania has been reasonably successful at Miss Teen USA. Their best decade was the 1990s, when they ranked fifth-equal in terms of number and value of placements . All but three of this state's placements came in the 1990s, with only one placement in the 1980s and two in the 2000s. The placement in 2000 was their best, however, when Jillian Parry captured the Miss Teen USA crown.

Five Pennsylvania teens have crossed over to win the Miss Pennsylvania USA title and compete at Miss USA.

Alheyda Guerra of Laredo, TX was appointed Miss Pennsylvania Teen USA 2026 on June 30th, 2026 after the open casting call from Thomas Brodeur, the new owner of the national pageant. She will represent Pennsylvania at Miss Teen USA 2026.

== Results summary ==
=== Placements ===
- Miss Teen USA: Jillian Parry (2000)
- 1st runner-up: Patricia Campbell (1996)
- 2nd runners-up: Ursula Abbott (1993), Sydney Robertson (2014), Maggie Ross (2023)
- 3rd runner-up: Yvonne Burke (2021)
- Top 6: Susan Barnett (1990)
- Top 10: Diane Hoyes (1983)
- Top 12: Nicole Bigham (1994)
- Top 15: Elliot Griffin (2008), Madison Longstreth (2011), Jasmine Daniels (2015)

Pennsylvania holds a record of 12 placements at Miss Teen USA.

=== Awards ===
- Best State Costume: Melissa Forlini (1986)
- Miss Congeniality Sydney Robertson (2014)

== Winners ==
- Declared as Winner
- Ended as runner-up
- Ended as one of the finalists or semifinalists

Year	Name	Hometown	Age^{1}	Local title	Placement at Miss Teen USA	Special awards at Miss Teen USA	Notes
2026	Alheyda Guerra	Laredo, TX	18	Miss Laredo Teen			
2025	Skylyn Goodenow	Harborcreek	19	Miss Lake Erie Teen			
2024	Elliot Oliphant	Allegheny County	19	Miss South Park Teen			
2023	Maggie Ross	Pittsburgh	18	Miss Allegheny County Teen	2nd runner-up		
2022	Alexandra Jones	Monongahela	18	Miss Monongahela River Teen			
2021	Yvonne Burke	Doylestown	18	Miss Doylestown Teen	3rd runner-up		
2020	Kiara Lin	Cranberry Township	17				
2019	Julia Meckley	Haverford	17				
2018	Kailey Grill	Mars	18				World's Perfect Teen 2016
2017	Lauren Ann Weaver	Windber	16				
2016	Sydney Dolanch	Pittsburgh	18				
2015	Jasmine Daniels	Collegeville	18		Top 15		Later Miss Pennsylvania USA 2023; 3rd runner-up at Miss USA 2023
2014	Sydney Robertson	Williamsport	16		2nd runner-up	Miss Congeniality	Later Miss Pennsylvania USA 2021
2013	Eboné Jimerson	North Wales	18				
2012	Julia Belechak	Cranberry Township	17				
2011	Madison Longstreth	Spring Grove	16		Top 15		Originally first runner-up; assumed the title after Deana Chuzhinina resigned for personal reasons
2011	Deana Chuzhinina	Doylestown	16		Did not compete		Resigned
2010	Elena LaQuatra	Mount Lebanon	18				Deaf since age 4 due to bacterial meningitis: Previously Miss Pennsylvania's Outstanding Teen 2007; 2nd runner-up at Miss America's Outstanding Teen 2007; Later Miss Pennsylvania USA 2016
2009	Alexis Jahnke	Furlong	16				
2008	Elliot Griffin	Wexford	17		Top 15		
2007	Kelsie Sinagra	Ross Township	17				
2006	Inessa Rodriguez	Manheim	17				
2005	Sarah Otey	Hershey	18				
2004	Chelsea MacDougall	Huntsville	17				
2003	Taylor Baker	Erie	18				
2002	Julienne Shaw	Pittsburgh	17				
2001	Rebecca Schlappich	Philadelphia	16				
2000	Jillian Parry	Newtown	18		Miss Teen USA 2000		
1999	Christina Cindrich	Philadelphia	18				
1998	Katherine Krause	Pittsburgh	17				
1997	Ashley Witmer	Philadelphia	19				
1996	Patricia Campbell	Philadelphia	18		1st runner-up		Later won US$50,000 by winning Fear Factor
1995	Erika Shay	Altoona	17				Contestant on The Amazing Race 5
1994	Nicole Bigham	Belle Vernon	18		Semi-finalist		Later Miss Pennsylvania USA 2002
1993	Ursula Abbott	Harrisburg	17		2nd runner-up		
1992	Tara Lavin	Philadelphia	19				
1991	Kimberly Parkins	New Brighton	18				
1990	Susan Barnett	Levittown	17		Top 6		Later Miss Pennsylvania USA 1996
1989	Jennifer Garry	Philadelphia	17				
1988	Desiree Fess	Latrobe	18				
1987	Tracy Reed	Myerstown	17				
1986	Melissa Forlini	Reading	16			Best State Costume	
1985	Kari Bernowski	Philadelphia	15				
1984	Robin Lynn Vish	Butler	17				
1983	Diane Hoyes	Washington	18		Semi-finalist		

^{1} Age at the time of the Miss Teen USA pageant
