= Kiran Reddy (pageanter) =

American beauty pageant titleholder

- Born: January 23, 2008 (age 18); Douglas, Georgia, U.S.
- Education: University of Georgia
- Beauty pageant titleholder
- Title: Miss Georgia Teen USA 2026; Miss Teen USA 2026
- Major competitions: Miss Teen USA 2026; (Winner) Miss Teen Universe 2026; (4th Runner-Up)

Kiran Reddy (born January 23, 2008) is an American beauty pageant titleholder who was crowned Miss Teen USA 2026.

Reddy is the first teen from Georgia to win the Miss Teen USA title.

== Early life and education ==
Reddy graduated from Coffee High School as valedictorian. As of Fall 2026, Reddy attends the University of Georgia majoring in biological sciences on the pre-med track, where she is a member of Alpha Omicron Pi.

== Pageantry ==
=== Miss Georgia Teen USA ===
Reddy began competing in pageants at the age of 15. She placed 1st runner-up at Miss Georgia Teen USA 2024, and later 2nd runner-up at Miss Georgia Teen USA 2025.

On June 30, 2026, Reddy was appointed the title of Miss Georgia Teen USA through the Miss Teen USA Open Casting Call, thus making history as the first Indian American Miss Georgia Teen USA.

=== Miss Teen USA 2026 ===
As Miss Teen USA, Reddy represented the United States at the Miss Teen Universe competition in Phnom Penh, Cambodia in October 2026, for the first time in the pageant's history. in the end, she placed as 4th Runner-up

Awards and achievements
Preceded by Mailyn Marsh	Miss Teen USA; 2026	Incumbent
Preceded by Kalysia Negron	Miss Georgia Teen USA; 2026	Vacant
