= Olivia Alexander =

Actress, singer, dancer

- Occupations: Actress, singer, Businesswoman
- Organization: Kush Queen

Olivia Alexander is an American actress, singer, dancer, and businesswoman born in Louisiana. Olivia appeared in national commercials for "Little Debbie's Snack Cakes" and "Ultra Gain Detergent" at the age of 2.

== Early life and education ==
As early as age two, Alexander was working as a child print model and commercial actress. After being discovered by a talent agent at a beauty pageant when she was six, Alexander began auditioning in Los Angeles without success. Returning to Los Angeles at the age of thirteen, she eventually appeared in music videos for the Jonas Brothers, Steve Holy, and Jermaine Dupri.

She attended Loyola Marymount University in Los Angeles, where she studied communications.

=== Acting career ===
She has played lead roles in Attack of the 50 Foot Cheerleader and 30 Nights of Paranormal Activity With the Devil Inside the Girl With the Dragon Tattoo. Four songs from her debut EP 'Its On' were featured in Attack of the 50 Foot Cheerleader, including the title track 'Attack Attack'.

In 2011, Alexander starred in her own pilot, Love Scouts, for Oxygen. In 2007, she appeared on MTV's Punk'd, Spike TV's Wild World of Spike, and was a finalist on So You Think You Can Dance. She portrayed Brooke in the horror film Old 37, in which she co-starred Mindy White, Bill Moseley and Kane Hodder.

== Filmography ==
Film
| Year | Title | Role | Notes |
|---|---|---|---|
| 2009 | Deep in the Valley | Brandi | (as Olivia Usey) |
| 2011 | Killer Eye: Halloween Haunt | Giselle | |
| 2012 | Attack of the 50 Foot Cheerleader | Brittany Andrews | |
| 2013 | 30 Nights of Paranormal Activity with the Devil Inside the Girl with the Dragon Tattoo | Liz Galen | |
| 2013 | Chocolate Milk | Betty | Short |
| 2015 | Bikini Model Academy | Dixie | |
| 2016 | Bus Driver | Madeline | |

Television
| Year | Title | Role | Episode | Original airdate | Notes |
|---|---|---|---|---|---|
| 2007 | Punk'd | Bikini Girl | Season 8, Episode 3 | April 24, 2007 | (as Olivia Usey) |
| 2007 | Wild World of Spike | Herself | Episode 8 | April 5, 2007 | |
| 2007 | Wild World of Spike | Herself | Episode 13 | May 10, 2007 | |
| 2007 | So You Think You Can Dance | Herself | | | Dancer |
