= Miss Teen USA 2024 =

42nd edition of the Miss Teen USA competition

- Date: August 1, 2024
- Presenters: Rachel Lindsay; Justin Sylvester
- Venue: Peacock Theater, Los Angeles, California
- Broadcaster: The CW
- Entrants: 51
- Placements: 20
- Winner: Addie Carver; Mississippi
- Congeniality: Kayla Kosmalski (Delaware)
- Photogenic: Sanjana Yendluri (Maryland)

Miss Teen USA 2024 was the 42nd Miss Teen USA pageant, held at the Peacock Theater in Los Angeles, California on August 1, 2024.

Addie Carver of Mississippi was crowned the winner by Miss USA 2023 Savannah Gankiewicz at the end of the event. This is their second title after Kristi Addis in 1987.

For the first time since 2007, it was televised on The CW television network.

== Results ==
=== Placements ===
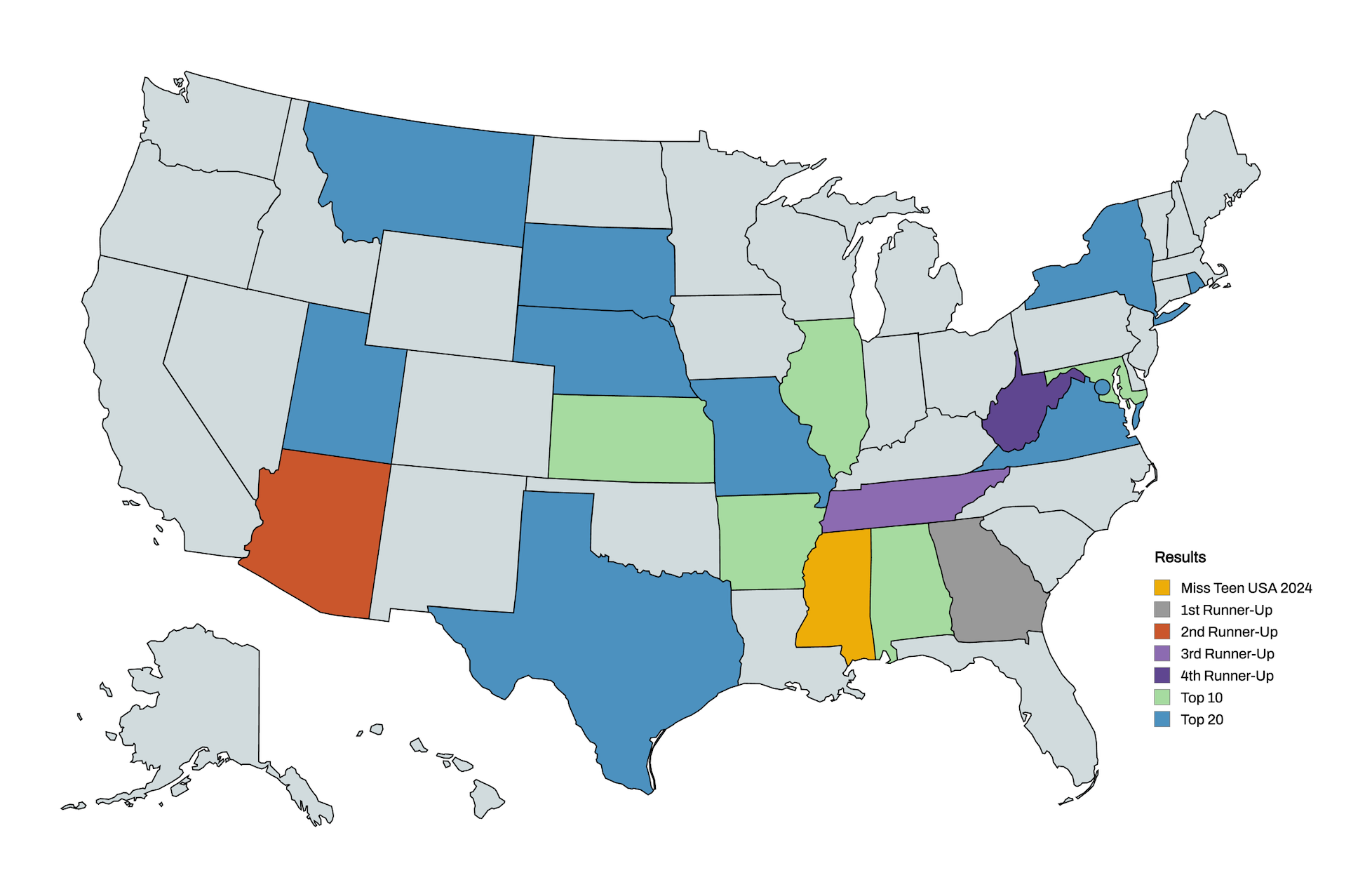
State placements for Miss Teen USA 2024

Placement	Contestant
Miss Teen USA 2024	Mississippi – Addie Carver
1st Runner-Up	Georgia – Ava Colindres
2nd Runner-Up	Arizona – Rachael McLaen
3rd Runner-Up	Tennessee – Townsend Blackwell
4th Runner-Up	West Virginia – Olivia Travis
Top 10	Alabama – Ava LeBlanc; Arkansas – Siyona Karkera; Illinois – Arianna Thompson; Kansas – Brilee Garrett; Maryland – Sanjana Yendluri
Top 20	District of Columbia – Chelsea Chambers; Missouri – Shelby Welling; Montana – Kailey Burress; Nebraska – Maggie Wadginskie; New York – Valarie Goorahoo §; Rhode Island – Carissa Tillinghast; South Dakota – Olivia Odenbrett; Texas – Dallyn Pesek; Utah – Sofia Forrest-Turner; Virginia – Julia Allen

§ – Voted into the Top 20 by viewers.

=== Special awards ===
Award	Contestant
Miss Photogenic	Maryland – Sanjana Yendluri
Miss Congeniality	Delaware – Kayla Kosmalski
Best in State Costume	Florida – Kennedie Clinton
Best in Evening Gown	Tennessee – Townsend Blackwell
Best in Activewear	Kansas – Brilee Garrett
Best in Interview	Kansas – Brilee Garrett
Best in Social Media	Alabama – Ava LeBlanc
People's Choice	New York – Valarie Goorahoo

== Pageant ==
=== Selection committee ===
- Francia Raisa – Actress
- Rylee Arnold – Professional dancer
- Alyssa Carson – Influencer
- Kaliegh Garris – Miss Teen USA 2019 from Connecticut
- Shree Saini – Model and Miss World America 2021 from Washington

== Contestants ==
51 titleholders competed for the title.

State/District	Contestant	Age (Note: Ages at the time of the pageant)	Hometown	Placement	Notes	Ref.
Alabama	Ava LeBlanc	18	Columbiana	Top 10	Sister of Marcelle LeBlanc, Miss Alabama's Outstanding Teen 2021 & Miss America's Outstanding Teen 2022	
Alaska	Nevaeh James	16	Anchorage			
Arizona	Rachael McLaen	19	Queen Creek	2nd Runner-up		
Arkansas	Siyona Karkera	19	Little Rock	Top 10		
California	Paige Gonor	18	San Diego			
Colorado	Reece Revious		Cherry Creek			
Connecticut	Ava Celentano	14	North Haven			
Delaware	Kayla Kosmalski	18	Dover		First Miss Delaware Teen USA with Down syndrome	
District of Columbia	Chelsea Chambers	19	Bloomingdale	Top 20		
Florida	Kennedie Clinton	18	Plant City			
Georgia	Ava Colindres	17	Johns Creek	1st Runner-up		
Hawaii	Hokuaoka'ale Emma Gilman	19	Haiku			
Idaho	Aly Feely	19	Eagle			
Illinois	Arianna Thompson	17	Oakland	Top 10		
Indiana	Aleah Dean	17	Austin			
Iowa	Grace Smithey	19	Polk City			
Kansas	Brilee Garrett	17	Wichita	Top 10		
Kentucky	Karlie Holmen	17	Gilbertsville			
Louisiana	Ava Watson	17	New Orleans			
Maine	Abbey Hafer	15	Kennebunk			
Maryland	Sanjana Yendluri	19	Germantown	Top 10		
Massachusetts	Avery Turner	18	Reading		Daughter of Jennifer Krafve, Miss Massachusetts USA 1999	
Michigan	Maddison Kott	18	Troy			
Minnesota	Grace Stahl	17	Minnetonka			
Mississippi	Addie Carver	17	Monticello	Miss Teen USA 2024		
Missouri	Shelby Welling	18	Jefferson City	Top 20		
Montana	Kailey Burress	17	Big Sky	Top 20		
Nebraska	Maggie Wadginski	19	Omaha	Top 20	Previously Miss Nebraska Teen Volunteer 2024; daughter of Miss Michigan Teen USA 1992 & Miss Nebraska USA 1999 WaLynda Lu Sipple	
Nevada	Courtney Clark	18	Las Vegas			
New Hampshire	Tara Marshall	17	Hanover			
New Jersey	Julia Livolsi	18	Glen Rock			
New Mexico	Fernanda Gonzalez	19	Albuquerque			
New York	Valarie Goorahoo	17	Valley Stream	Top 20		
North Carolina	Kaylee Stavlas	17	Raleigh			
North Dakota	Jaycee Parker	17	Minot Air Force Base			
Ohio	Mackenzie Gibson	18	Canal Winchester			
Oklahoma	Megan Lamza	18	Wright City			
Oregon	Ashlyn Hart	17	Florence			
Pennsylvania	Elliot Oliphant	19	South Park			
Rhode Island	Carissa Tillinghast	19	Warwick	Top 20		
South Carolina	Jules Grass	18	Clemson			
South Dakota	Olivia Odenbrett	17	Brandon	Top 20	Previously Miss South Dakota's Outstanding Teen 2022	
Tennessee	Townsend Blackwell	16	Lakeland	3rd Runner-up		
Texas	Dallyn Pesek	17	Shiner	Top 20		
Utah	Sofia Forrest Turner	18	Provo	Top 20		
Vermont	Josslyn McKenna	16	Colchester			
Virginia	Julia Allen	17	Lynchburg	Top 20		
Washington	Kendall Beasley	17	Kennewick			
West Virginia	Olivia Travis	19	Barboursville	4th Runner-up		
Wisconsin	Olivia Negri	17	Park Falls			
Wyoming	Aubree Kruger	18	Worland			
