= Janel Bishop =

American beauty queen (born 1974)

- Born: Janel Bishop; Manchester, New Hampshire, U.S.
- Beauty pageant titleholder
- Title: Miss New Hampshire Teen USA 1991; Miss Teen USA 1991
- Hair color: Brown
- Eye color: Brown
- Major competitions: Miss New Hampshire Teen USA 1991 (Winner); Miss Teen USA 1991 (Winner)

Janel Bishop (born 1974) is an American model and beauty queen who won the 1991 Miss Teen USA title. She is the first African-American winner of this pageant.

== Background ==
Bishop won the Miss New Hampshire Teen USA title and represented New Hampshire in the Miss Teen USA 1991 pageant held in Biloxi, Mississippi on 19 August 1991. She became the first contestant from New Hampshire to win the Miss Teen USA title and was crowned by outgoing titleholder Bridgette Wilson of Oregon. Bishop received more than $150,000 in cash and prizes as part of her prize package. At the time of her pageant win, Bishop was a student at Manchester West High School and wished to pursue a career in education.
