= Elizabeth Mathis =

American actress (active 2001–2015)

- Occupation: Actress
- Years active: 2001-2015

Elizabeth Mathis is an American former actress from Detroit. Mostly appearing in minor or supporting roles, she may be best known for her role as Pushy, in the 2011 direct-to-video Blue Crush 2. Her last screen appearance was the 2015 short film The Break.

== Early life ==
Southfield, Michigan, native Mathis briefly participated in beauty pageants, winning Miss Teen Michigan in 1998, though she did not place in the follow-up national pageant.

== Career ==
After a number of years in background roles ('Irresistible Fantasy Woman #2', 'Hot Girl 2', 'Siren #4'), as well as minor roles in two feature films (Tess in 2007's Enchanted and Nicole in 2010's Unstoppable), Mathis had a major role in the 2011 direct-to-video film Blue Crush 2. After Blue Crush 2, Mathis appeared in only three more, direct-to-video, releases; two in 2012 and one in 2015.

Mathis went through tough training for her role as Pushy in Blue Crush 2, including learning how to surf, despite having an on-screen surf-double. Mathis worked with her dialect coach for two hours every day in preparation for her role as a native South African.

== Filmography ==
=== Television ===
Year	Programs	Role
2001	What About Joan	Cheerleader #1
2005	Rescue Me	Woman #1
2005	Law & Order: Criminal Intent	Naomi
2006	Six Degrees	Receptionist
2006	Love Monkey	Woman
2008	House of Payne	Older Jazmine
2010	Glory Daze	Hot Girl 2
2010	CSI: Miami	Female Mc

=== Films ===
Year	Films	Role
2007	Enchanted	Tess
2007	I Think I Love My Wife	Irresistible Fantasy Woman #2
2010	TRON: Legacy	Siren #4
2010	Unstoppable	Nicole Barnes
2011	Blue Crush 2	Pushy
2012	100,000 Zombie Heads	Neurah
