= Blue Crush 2 =

- DVD cover
- Directed by: Mike Elliott
- Written by: Randall McCormick
- Produced by: Mike Elliott
- Starring: Sasha Jackson; Elizabeth Mathis; Ben Milliken; Chris Fisher; Gideon Emery; Rosy Hodge; Rodger Halston; Sharni Vinson
- Cinematography: Trevor Michael Brown
- Edited by: Roderick Davis
- Music by: J. Peter Robinson
- Production company: Imagine Entertainment
- Distributed by: Universal Studios Home Entertainment
- Release date: June 7, 2011
- Running time: 113 minutes
- Country: United States
- Language: English

Blue Crush 2 is a 2011 American sports drama film directed by Mike Elliott, and starring Sasha Jackson, Elizabeth Mathis, Ben Milliken, Chris Fisher, Gideon Emery, and Sharni Vinson. Despite the title, it is not a plot continuation of the 2002 film and critic reviews were generally negative.

== Plot ==
After looking through her deceased mother's diary filled with pictures of her time surfing in South Africa, Dana decides to leave California to travel there, surfing everywhere her mother did, as well as Jeffreys Bay, where her mother always wanted to surf but never did. Dana leaves while her father, Joel, is away on a business trip taking a wooden carving with her. On her plane ride there, she meets Grant and he tells her to look him up if she is in his area. After landing, Dana boards a bus headed for the beach and is followed by a man that tries to take her backpack. When he tries to sit next to her, she calls to a girl around her age that just boarded the bus saying she saved her a seat. Pushy introduces herself and they go surfing together after Dana puts her backpack in a locker. On the water, they meet Tara and Dan Wigmore, stuck-up Roxy surfers. After some confrontation, Pushy leaves, and Dana beats Tara for a wave. On the next wave, Tara cuts in on Dana, causing her to break her board that was her mother's and cannot be replaced.

Back on the beach, Dana finds that her locker was broken into and her money and wooden carving (belonging to her mother) were stolen. Pushy takes a distraught Dana back to her place, a group of huts on the beach where she and other surfers live. Tara also lives there and continues to be mean to Dana. At the same time, policemen arrive and give the surfers one week to vacate the premises. Dana meets Tim and he instantly takes a liking to her. That night, a party takes place, and while Tim is trying to talk to Dana, she spots Grant from the plane and dances with and kisses him. The next day, she tells them about her mom and how she wants to take pictures of herself at all the same places her mom did. Tara bets her a hundred dollars that she won't be able to do it and Pushy agrees to travel with Dana on her "odyssey". Grant lets them borrow his truck in exchange for working at his restaurant. As they are about to leave, Tim gives Dana a Polaroid camera so that the pictures will be the same and her board that he repaired. After each surfing destination, they return to the beach house. Dana still has aspirations to fulfill her mother's dream, and Pushy will try out for the Roxy team.

While waiting for the right weather to leave for Jeffreys Bay, Dana works, and one day, she thinks she sees the man that stole her possessions. He is talking to Grant, but Grant says he doesn't know the man. That night, Dana and Pushy travel to the part of town Pushy is from to go dancing. While there, Dana is confronted by the man who stole her possessions, and she and Pushy follow him and find Grant's truck filled with elephant tusks. The men chase them, and they barely escape. Pushy then gets upset at Dana and says she is dangerous and on her own for the bay. After their fight, Dana rips down all the odyssey pictures from the wall. The next morning, the police return with bulldozers to demolish the illegal beach hut where they live. After escaping, Dana and Pushy reconcile. Tim gets his bus working and they decide that everyone will drive to the bay. On the bus, Tim has the odyssey pictures that he saved from the demolition, and he and Dana grow closer. One night, while everyone is gathered around a fire, Dana and Tim go off, and he sings her a song he wrote her, and they fall in love.

Meanwhile, Dana's father finds her gone and comes to South Africa searching for her. He ends up at the demolished beach hut and is told they went to the bay, so he flies there to find her. Dana's father then finds her, and they argue. While Tim and Pushy are consoling her, they run into a beach party that Grant and Tara are at. Tim confronts Grant about the elephant tusks, which results in a fistfight where Tim subdues Grant. The next day, Pushy tries out for the Roxy surf team and wins using that 360 aerial move that Dana has been teaching her. Tara puts aside their differences and congratulates her. Tara also returns the wooden carving to Dana that she found among Grant's things. That night, Dana's father returns, and after making up, she shows him the pictures of her odyssey and gives him the wooden carving. They then go to the beach and drop her mother's ashes out the carving. The next day, Dana goes to surf at the bay that has very big waves and is a boy's club. Once out there, Grant gets the guys to let her stay, and after getting crushed on the first wave, she has a great ride with Tim, Pushy, and her dad watching her. They then take a picture together, and her dad says that he is proud of her and that her mother would be, too. The film ends with Dana and everybody back on the bus and heading on their next location.

== Cast ==
- Sasha Jackson as Dana
- Elizabeth Mathis as Pushy AKA Dan Wigmore
- Ben Milliken as Tim
- Sharni Vinson as Tara
- Chris Fisher as Grant
- Gideon Emery as Joel
- Rosy Hodge as Catherine
- Rodger Halston as Cowboy

== Critical response ==
On the review aggregator website Rotten Tomatoes, 33% of 6 critics' reviews are positive, with an average rating of 4.1/10.
