= Mailyn Marsh =

Miss Teen USA 2025

- Born: Mailyn Reese Marsh; August 17, 2008 (age 18); Ozark, Missouri, U.S.
- Beauty pageant titleholder
- Title: Miss Missouri Teen USA 2025; Miss Teen USA 2025
- Major competitions: Miss Missouri Teen USA 2025; (Winner); Miss Teen USA 2025; (Winner) Miss Teen Universe 2026; (1st Runner-Up)

Mailyn Reese Marsh (born August 17, 2008) is an American beauty pageant titleholder who won Miss Missouri Teen USA 2025 then subsequently won Miss Teen USA 2025. She is also Miss Teen Universe Hungary 2026 and the 1st runner-up of Miss Teen Universe 2026.

Marsh is an experienced equestrian and pageant titleholder hailing from Ozark, Missouri. She is passionate about education and empowering young women by advocating for period poverty, organizing and promoting menstrual product donation drives.

== Early life and education ==
Marsh is the daughter of Corey Joe Marsh and Amanda Carraway who was Miss Kansas Teen USA 1996 and Miss Kansas USA 1999. As of October 2025, Marsh is a senior and an honors student at Ozark High School. Marsh aspires to become a board-certified dermatologist.

== Pageantry ==
Mailyn Marsh was crowned Miss Missouri Teen USA 2025 on May 11, 2025, at The Mansion Theater for the Performing Arts in Branson, Missouri. Marsh represented Missouri at the national Miss Teen USA 2025 competition in Reno, Nevada, at the Grand Sierra Resort on October 23, 2025.

Awards and achievements
Preceded by Addie Carver	Miss Teen USA; 2025	Succeeded by Kiran Reddy
Preceded by Shelby Welling	Miss Missouri Teen USA; 2025	Succeeded by Vegas Turner
