= 30 Nights of Paranormal Activity with the Devil Inside the Girl with the Dragon Tattoo =

2013 American parody comedy film

- Film poster
- Directed by: Craig Moss
- Written by: Craig Moss
- Produced by: Jim Busfield; Ben Feingold; Ash R. Shah
- Starring: Kathryn Fiore; Flip Schultz; Olivia Alexander
- Cinematography: Rudy Harbon
- Edited by: Clark Burnett
- Music by: Todd Haberman
- Distributed by: Silver Nitrate; 20th Century Fox Home Entertainment
- Release date: January 15, 2013
- Running time: 80 minutes
- Country: United States
- Language: English
- Budget: $3,000,000

30 Nights of Paranormal Activity with the Devil Inside the Girl with the Dragon Tattoo is a 2013 American parody comedy film directed by Craig Moss and starring Kathryn Fiore, Flip Schultz, and Olivia Alexander. The film parodies several films and generally follows the plots of Paranormal Activity and The Devil Inside, with the title also making reference to 30 Days of Night and The Girl with the Dragon Tattoo.

== Plot ==
After living in a psychiatric hospital, Dana (Kathryn Fiore) along with her husband, Aaron (Flip Schultz) attempt to move into their new house where her father (French Stewart) has murdered the entire cast of The Artist during his exorcism. Dana finds herself dealing with various others who live in the house, including an evil spirit and a teenage daughter (Olivia Alexander) who is infatuated with their neighbor Abraham Lincoln (Ben Morrison).

== Reception ==
The film was panned by critics. Exclaim! gave the film a two out of ten rating, stating that "Somewhere buried underneath all of the terrible references and non-sequiturs are maybe one or two chuckles that weren't elicited without a fair amount of shame and guilt."
