= Miss Teen USA 1991 =

9th edition of the Miss Teen USA competition

- Date: August 19, 1991
- Presenters: Dick Clark; Leeza Gibbons; Kelly Hu
- Venue: Mississippi Coast Coliseum, Biloxi, Mississippi
- Broadcaster: CBS; WHLT
- Entrants: 51
- Placements: 12
- Winner: Janel Bishop; New Hampshire
- Congeniality: Holly Furman; North Carolina
- Photogenic: Gina Tognoni; Rhode Island

Miss Teen USA 1991, the 9th Miss Teen USA pageant, was televised live from the Mississippi Gulf Coast Coliseum in Biloxi, Mississippi on 19 August 1991.

At the conclusion of the final competition, Janel Bishop of New Hampshire was crowned by outgoing titleholder Bridgette Wilson of Oregon. Bishop is the first African American winner ever and the first titleholder from New Hampshire.

The pageant was hosted by Dick Clark (who last hosted it in 1988 and was already also hosting Miss USA & Miss Universe Pageants on CBS), with color commentary by Leeza Gibbons and Miss Teen USA 1985 Kelly Hu for the second time. Music was provided by the Gulf Coast Teen Orchestra.

This was the second of five years that the pageant was held in Biloxi. After the city hosted Miss Teen USA 1990, it entered negotiations with the Miss Universe company in October 1990 to host the pageant for a further four years, and an announcement to that effect was made in early November.

== Results ==
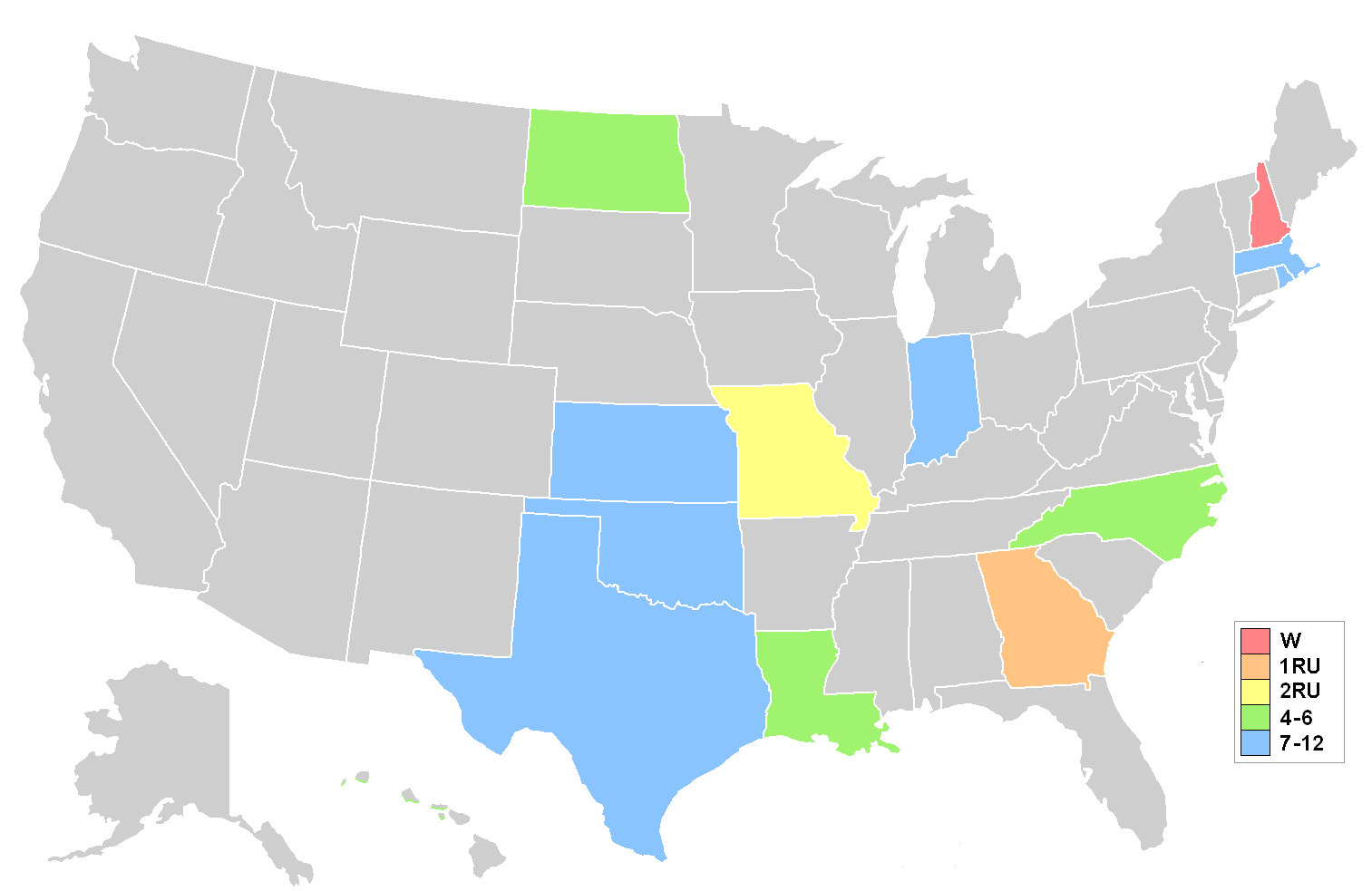
Miss Teen USA 1991 final placements.

=== Placements ===
Final results	Contestant
Miss Teen USA 1991	New Hampshire – Janel Bishop
1st Runner-Up	(Georgia (U.S. state)) Georgia – Meredith Young
2nd Runner-Up	Missouri – Audra Sherman
Top 6	Louisiana – Allison McIntyre; North Carolina – Holly Furman; North Dakota – Nicci Elkins
Top 12	Indiana – Heather Michelle Hart; Kansas – Denise Blatchford; Massachusetts – Erinn Bartlett; Oklahoma – Rachel Childers; Rhode Island – Gina Tognoni; Texas – Kara Williams

=== Special awards ===
Award	Contestant
Miss Congeniality	North Carolina – Holly Furman
Miss Photogenic	Rhode Island – Gina Tognoni

== Historical significance ==
- New Hampshire wins competition for the first time. Also becoming in the 8th state who wins Miss Teen USA.
- Georgia earns the 1st runner-up position for the first time.
- Missouri earns the 2nd runner-up position for the first time.
- Louisiana finishes as Top 6 for the first time.
- North Carolina finishes as Top 6 for the first time.
- North Dakota finishes as Top 6 for the first time.
- States that placed in semifinals the previous year were Georgia, Louisiana, Massachusetts, Missouri and Texas.
- Texas placed for the fourth consecutive year.
- Georgia, Louisiana, Massachusetts and Missouri made their second consecutive placement.
- North Dakota and Oklahoma last placed in 1989.
- North Carolina last placed in 1987.
- Indiana placed for the first time.
- Kansas placed for the first time.
- New Hampshire placed for the first time.
- Rhode Island placed for the first time.
- Kentucky breaks an ongoing streak of placements since 1989.
- Miss Rhode Island Teen USA: Gina Tognoni would go on to become a Three-time Daytime Emmy Award actress, as Dinah Marler on Guiding Light and Phyllis Summers on The Young And The Restless Where her younger sister was played by Jessica Collins - Miss New York Teen USA 1988, where she finished as 1st runner-up.

== Delegates ==
The Miss Teen USA 1991 delegates were:

- Alabama - Stephanie Gwantley
- Alaska - Stacey Stewart
- Arizona - Christine Tulah
- Arkansas - Paula Montgomery
- California - Jolene Fulkner
- Colorado - Kiki Kianne Morricall
- Connecticut - Allison Benusis
- Delaware - Michelle Daulton
- District of Columbia - Marja Allen
- Florida - Marnie West
- Georgia - Meredith Young
- Hawaii - Trini-Ann Leilani Kaopuiki
- Idaho - Angelia Madrey
- Illinois - Kara Kline
- Indiana - Heather Hart
- Iowa - Tina Foehring
- Kansas - Denise Blatchford
- Kentucky - Christine Jaxman
- Louisiana - Allison MacIntyre
- Maine - Kerri Malinowski
- Maryland - Jennifer Wilhoit
- Massachusetts - Erinn Bartlett
- Michigan - Lori Hahnbomb
- Minnesota - Natasha Grinaski
- Mississippi - Jimmi Gliann
- Missouri - Audra Sherman
- Montana - Theresa Rosenbaum
- Nebraska - Erin Mouther
- Nevada - Brooke Hammond
- New Hampshire - Janel Bishop
- New Jersey - Keri Paarz
- New Mexico - Kimberly Apadocka
- New York - Wendy Cooper
- North Carolina - Holly Furman
- North Dakota - Nicci Elkins
- Ohio - Michelle Mouser
- Oklahoma - Rachel Childers
- Oregon - Delilah Anderson
- Pennsylvania - Kimberly Parkis
- Rhode Island - Gina Tognoni
- South Carolina - Jeanie Bowers
- South Dakota - Tabitha Moude
- Tennessee - Tris Sax
- Texas - Kara Williams
- Utah - Corrine Peterson
- Vermont - Anne-Marie Giroux
- Virginia - Linda Overhue
- Washington - Elizabeth Lee
- West Virginia - Tracey Rexroad
- Wisconsin - Pamela Shradder
- Wyoming - Britta Lund
