= Sasha Jackson =

British actress (born 1988)

- Born: Windsor, Berkshire, England
- Occupation: Actress
- Years active: 2003–present

Sasha Jackson is a British actress from Windsor, Berkshire.

== Career ==
Jackson played the roles of Olivia in Jarhead 3: The Siege, Laura Kidwell in Desolate Road, Jett in Attack of the 50 Foot Cheerleader and Amy in The Formula. Her further acting credits on American and British television include CSI: Crime Scene Investigation as Eva Byron, One Tree Hil as Kylie in Season 7 and also in Season 9; as a British caricature of Malin Ackerman in Childrens Hospital and as American gold-digger April in 'Til Death with Brad Garrett, in Rita Rocks, episode 5 of Fuller House as Shannon and in British productions Star and This Morning. Jackson also made a cameo appearance in the pilot episode of Happy Endings.

Feature film roles include the lead in the direct-to-DVD production Blue Crush 2 as American teenager Dana. She appeared in the UK television miniseries Dorothy and the Witches of Oz as Ilsa Lang/Princess Langwidere. and played the lead in the direct-to-video Everything To Dance For. She also appeared in Lawrence Pearce's Night Junkies.

She also played AJ on an online series called KickAssKandy where she played a martial arts trained super agent who fought against evil henchmen. Her fighting style and personality made her a fan favorite.
