= Addie Carver =

Miss Teen USA 2024

- Born: Addison Blakeney Carver; December 13, 2006 (age 19); Monticello, Mississippi, U.S.
- Education: Mississippi State University
- Beauty pageant titleholder
- Title: Miss Mississippi Teen USA 2024; Miss Teen USA 2024
- Major competitions: Miss Mississippi Teen USA 2023 (1st Runner-Up); Miss Mississippi Teen USA 2024; (Winner); Miss Teen USA 2024; (Winner)

Addison Blakeney Carver (born December 13, 2006) is an American beauty pageant titleholder who won Miss Mississippi Teen USA 2024 then subsequently won Miss Teen USA 2024.

== Early life and education ==
Carver was born in Monticello, Mississippi and is the daughter of Dwayne and Kristi Carney and the late Chuck Carver. Carver attended and graduated from Lawrence County High School in May 2025 as a varsity cheerleader, BETA Club member, Student Council representative, Diamond Doll, and member of the Future Health Professionals (HOSA).

As of 2026, Carver is a sophomore at Copiah-Lincoln Community College in Wesson, Mississippi.

== Pageantry ==
Addie Carver was crowned Miss Mississippi Teen USA 2024 on April 6, 2024, at the Pearl River Resort in Choctaw, Mississippi. Carver represented Mississippi at the national Miss Teen USA 2024 competition on August 1, 2024, at the Peacock Theater in Los Angeles, California, which she won.

Awards and achievements
Preceded by UmaSofia Srivastava	Miss Teen USA; 2024	Succeeded by Mailyn Marsh
Preceded by Claire Ulmer	Miss Mississippi Teen USA; 2024	Succeeded by Madalyn Oliphant
