= Miss Georgia Teen USA =

Beauty pageant competition

- Formation: 1983
- Type: Beauty pageant
- Headquarters: Collierville
- Location: Tennessee
- Members: Miss Teen USA
- Official language: English
- Website: Official website

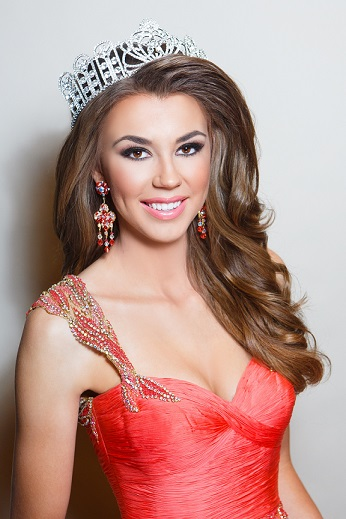
Mary Calkins, Miss Georgia Teen USA 2015

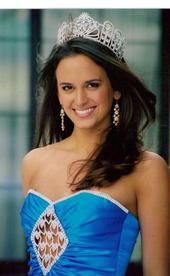
Jena Sims, Miss Georgia Teen USA 2007

The Miss Georgia Teen USA competition is the pageant that selects the representative for the state of Georgia in the Miss Teen USA pageant. This pageant is directed Greenwood Productions under the ownership of Miss Tennessee USA 1989 Kim Greenwood. The pageant is hosted in McDonough, Georgia.

Georgia is in the top 5 most successful states at Miss Teen USA in terms of number and value of placements. After countless runner-up and semi-finalist finishes, Kiran Reddy of Douglas was the first teen from Georgia to win the national title on August 26, 2026.

Seven Georgia teens later won the Miss Georgia USA crown, and two others won the Miss Indiana USA and Miss Virginia USA titles, respectively. Kelly Jerles, the first Miss Georgia Teen USA, became the first Teen titleholder to compete at Miss America, representing Georgia in 1987. Another Georgia teen also competed for Alabama at that pageant.

Kiran Reddy of Douglas was appointed Miss Georgia Teen USA 2026 on June 30th, 2026, after the open casting call from Thomas Brodeur, the new owner of the national pageant. She represented Georgia at Miss Teen USA 2026 and later won the title, marking the state's first title in the pageant's history.

== Results summary ==
=== Placements ===
- Miss Teen USA: Kiran Reddy (2026)
- 1st runners-up: Meredith Young (1991), Whitney Fuller (1994), Brooke Fletcher (2009), Ava Colindres (2024)
- 2nd runners-up: Holly Roehl (1990), Shayla Jackson (2020)
- 3rd runners-up: Kelly Jerles (1983), Julia Martin (2013)
- 4th runners-up: Kimberly "Kim" Harlan (2002), Brittany Sharp (2006)
- Top 5/6: Denesha Reid (1993), Abby Vaillancourt (2000)
- Top 10: Meredith Brown (1985), Hope Allen (1987), Brandy Drake (2001), Katherine "Katie" Conkle (2005), Savannah Miles (2018), Kalysia Negron (2025)
- Top 15/16/20: Brooke Calhoun (2004), Kristen Robinson (2011), Courtney Smits (2012), Bentley Wright (2016), Liza Greenberg (2021), Courtney Smith (2022), Denim Lovett (2023)

Georgia holds a record of 26 placements at Miss Teen USA.

=== Awards ===
- Style Award: Abby Vaillancourt (2000), Brandy Drake (2001)

== Winners ==
- Declared as Winner
- Ended as runner-up
- Ended as one of the finalists or semifinalists

Year	Name	Hometown	Age^{1}	Local title	Placement at Miss Teen USA	Special awards at Miss Teen USA	Notes
2026	Kiran Reddy	Douglas	18	Miss GA South Teen	Miss Teen USA 2026		4th Runner-Up at Miss Teen Universe 2026
2025	Kalysia Janell Negron	Atlanta	19	Miss Cobb County Teen	Top 10		Previously Miss Georgia Teen Volunteer 2024: Placed 4th runner-up at Miss Teen Volunteer America 2025
2024	Ava Colindres	Johns Creek	17	Miss Johns Creek Teen	1st Runner-up		
2023	Denim Lovett	Bonaire	19	Miss Greater Warner Robins Teen	Top 20		
2022	Courtney Ianna Smith	Atlanta	15	Miss GA South Teen	Top 16		America's Ideal Miss Junior Teen 2021
2021	Elizabeth "Liza" Greenberg	Peachtree City	19	Miss Fayette County Teen	Top 16		
2020	Shayla Jackson	Valdosta	17	Miss Valdosta Teen	2nd Runner-up		Previously Miss High School America 2018
2019	Isabella Bloedorn	Acworth	15	Miss North Paulding Teen			
2018	Savannah Miles	Atlanta	17	Miss GA South Teen	Top 10		Later Miss Georgia USA 2025; Top 10 at Miss USA 2025
2017	Taylor Ward	Valdosta	17	Miss South GA Teen			
2016	Bentley Wright	Vidalia	18	Miss Coastal GA Teen	Top 15		Non finalist at Miss Georgia's Outstanding Teen 2013
2015	Mary Calkins	Augusta	19	Miss Augusta Teen			
2014	Noelle Hughley	Lithonia	17	Miss Arabia Mountain Teen			
2013	Julia Martin	Marietta	18	Miss Heart of Georgia Teen	3rd runner-up		Previously Miss Georgia's Outstanding Teen 2011
2012	Courtney Lynne Smits	McDonough	15	Miss McDonough Teen	Top 16		Later Miss Virginia USA 2019
2011	Kristen O'Neal Robinson	Stone Mountain	17	Miss Stone Mountain Teen	Top 15		
2010	Caroline Marie Wade	Acworth	16	Miss Dalton Teen			
2009	Brooke Nicole Fletcher	Peachtree City	17	Miss Peachtree City Teen	1st runner-up		Later Miss Georgia USA 2015
2008	Shannon Geraghty	Norcross	16	Miss Peachtree Corners Teen			
2007	Jena Michelle Sims	Winder	17	Miss Barrow County Teen			Miss National Junior Teenager 2004
2006	Brittany Sharp	Roswell	15	Miss Greater Atlanta Teen	4th runner-up		Later Miss Georgia USA 2013
2005	Katherine Marie "Katie" Conkle	Hampton	18		Top 10		
2004	Brooke Calhoun	Roswell	18		Top 15		
2003	Cassady Lance	Savannah	18				Later Miss Georgia USA 2010
2002	Kimberly Ann "Kim" Harlan	Marietta	18		4th runner-up		Later Miss World U.S. 2003, competed at Miss World 2003
2001	Brandy Drake	Danielsville	18		Semi-finalist	Clairol Style Award	
2000	Abby Vaillancourt	Fayetteville	19		Top 5	Clairol Style Award	
1999	Keely Wright	Powder Springs	17				Originally first runner-up; assumed the title after Kim failed to obtain citizenship requirements.
1999	Jane Kim		16		Did not compete		Dethroned after she failed citizenship requirements.
1998	Kimberly Midori Thompson	Augusta	18				
1997	Cheri Wheeler	Savannah	17				
1996	Summer Newmann	Richmond Hill	17				
1995	Gillian Nicholson	Colquitt					
1994	Whitney Fuller	Sautee Nacoochee	16		1st runner-up		
1993	Denesha Reid	Fayetteville	18		Top 6		Later Miss Georgia USA 1997
1992	Kristie Harmon	Conyers	18				Later Miss World America 1994, competed at Miss World 1994
1991	Meredith Young	Cairo	18		1st runner-up		Later Miss Georgia USA 1999
1990	Holly Roehl	Griffin	17		2nd runner-up		Later Miss Indiana USA 1996
1989	Kim Malloy	Columbus					
1988	Erin Nance	Calhoun	16				Later Miss Georgia USA 1993; 1st runner up at Miss USA 1993; 2nd runner up at Miss Oktoberfest 1994; Miss Teen All American 1991
1987	Melissa Hope Allen	Thomaston	16		Semi-finalist		
1986	Wendy Newendorf	Atlanta	16				Later Miss Alabama 1991
1985	Meredith Brown	Atlanta	17		Semi-finalist		
1984	Andrea Randall	Marietta					
1983	Kelly Ann Jerles	Perry	16		3rd runner-up		Later Miss Georgia 1987
