= Keylee Sue Sanders =

American beauty queen (born 1977)

- Born: Keylee Sue Sanders; July 29, 1977 (age 49); Louisburg, Kansas, U.S.
- Height: 5 ft 7 in (1.70 m)
- Beauty pageant titleholder
- Title: Miss Kansas Teen USA 1995; Miss Teen USA 1995
- Agency: Vanbros and Associate INC. (State Title); Miss Universe Organization (National Title)
- Hair color: Brown
- Eye color: Hazel
- Major competitions: Miss Kansas Teen USA 1995; (Winner); Miss Teen USA 1995; (Winner)

Keylee Sue Sanders (born July 29, 1977) is an American model and beauty queen who was Miss Kansas Teen USA, and Miss Teen USA 1995.

Sanders first won the Miss Kansas Teen USA title in October 1994. In August 1995 she was crowned Miss Teen USA in the national pageant televised live from Wichita, in her home state of Kansas. As Miss Kansas Teen USA, Sanders was part of the Vanbros organization, and she would retain links with that group after she gave up her crown.

== Early life ==
Keylee grew up on a horse and cattle ranch in a very small town in Kansas. She wanted to work in fashion for as long as she could remember. Around the age of fourteen, Keylee was in high school, and really wanted a summer job to earn her own money and be independent. She started going door-to-door in her small Kansas town asking local businesses for job applications.

She graduated from Kansas State University with a bachelor’s degree in Fashion Design, and started her first post-college job as a personal shopper at Nordstrom. She made the decision to put her degree to work and began designing custom evening wear with her mentor, the late Stephen Yearick. They met when Keylee was Miss Teen USA in 1995 and instantly hit it off.

She moved to Los Angeles, California in 2002 with her then-husband and her career took a shift when an agent talked her into giving the entertainment world a go. Keylee appeared on Good Day Live, Soap Talk and in a Smash Mouth video. She continues to appear as an on-air fashion expert and on-air host for Good Day LA and Good Day Live. She also continues to model and work in commercials.

After a few attempts at acting, she switched from acting to hosting. Keylee remained involved in pageantry, and formed her own pageant consulting business, Keylee Sue & Associates, Inc, in 1997. In 1999, Sanders designed the competition gowns for Miss Kansas Teen USA and Miss Missouri Teen USA.

Sanders joined with Keith Lewis, director of the Morgan Agency to form K2 Productions, and this company took over the directorship of the Miss California USA and Miss California Teen USA pageants in 2006.

In 2016, she was one of the judges at the Miss Teen USA 2016 pageant, in The Venetian Theatre, Las Vegas, Nevada.
