= Jena Sims =

American actress and model (born 1988)

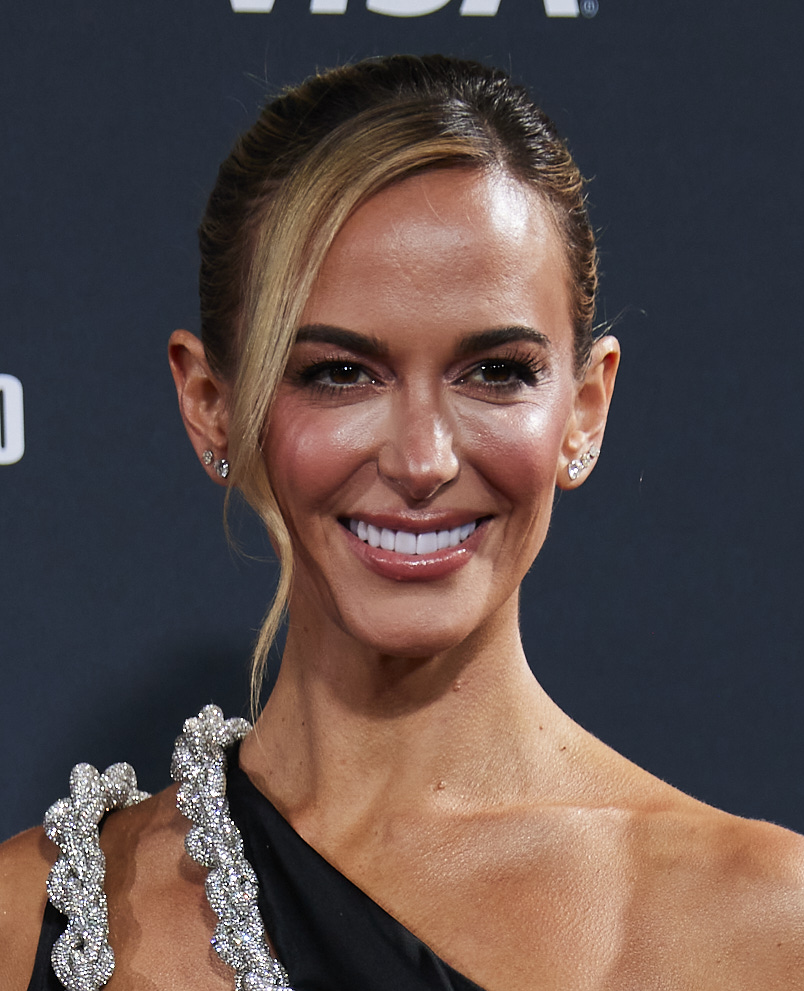
- Sims at the 2024 Toronto International Film Festival
- Born: Jena Michelle Sims; December 30, 1988 (age 37); Winder, Georgia, U.S.
- Height: 5 ft 8 in (1.73 m)
- Spouse: Brooks Koepka (m. 2022)
- Children: 1
- Beauty pageant titleholder
- Title: Miss Georgia Teen USA 2007
- Hair color: Brown
- Eye color: Brown
- Major competition: Miss Teen USA 2007 (unplaced)

Jena Sims Koepka (born Jena Michelle Sims; December 30, 1988) is an American actress and model. She has appeared in made-for-TV films and B movies such as Attack of the 50 Foot Cheerleader (2012), 3-Headed Shark Attack (2015) and Sharknado 5: Global Swarming (2017). She was also named Miss Georgia Teen USA in 2007.

== Early life and education ==
Sims grew up in Winder, Georgia, and graduated from Winder-Barrow High School in 2007. She briefly attended Belmont University in Nashville, Tennessee, where she studied marketing.

== Career ==
=== Pageantry ===
Jena Sims in Los Angeles, California at her Prince and Princess of Hope Pageant

In 2004, Sims was crowned Miss Georgia Junior National Teenager, and later won the Miss Junior National Teenager title 2005. A year later, Sims won the Miss Georgia Teen USA 2007 title in a state pageant held in Newnan on November 11, 2006. Sims represented Georgia in the Miss Teen USA 2007 pageant in Pasadena, California, in August 2007, but did not place. She was the first Miss Georgia Teen USA not to place in the pageant since 2003.

==== Pageant of Hope ====
Sims runs a non-profit organisation that hosts beauty pageants for children with cancer and other disadvantages called the Pageant of Hope. The pageants have been held in Georgia, Tennessee, New York, Michigan, Wisconsin, and California.

=== Acting ===
Sims has starred in Attack of the 50 Foot Cheerleader (2012), and has appeared in an episode of television series Entourage.

== Personal life ==
On June 4, 2022, Sims married golfer Brooks Koepka. The couple's first child, a son, was born on July 27, 2023.

== Filmography ==
=== Film ===
| Year | Title | Role | Notes |
|---|---|---|---|
| 2012 | Attack of the 50 Foot Cheerleader | Cassie Stratford | |
| 2013 | Dead Reckoning | Southern Assassin | Short film |
| 2013 | Chocolate Milk | Shelley | Short film |
| 2013 | The Anna Nicole Story | Third Dancer | TV movie |
| 2013 | Promo Life | Michelle | TV movie |
| 2013 | Last Vegas | Dean's Girl | |
| 2013 | Best Night Ever | Hooker #2 | |
| 2014 | Angel Investors | News Reporter | |
| 2014 | Kill the Messenger | Quail's Girlfriend | |
| 2015 | American Beach House | Lola | |
| 2015 | 3-Headed Shark Attack | Dr. Laura Thomas | |
| 2015 | Bullfrog Bullfrog | Amanda Hendricks | Short film |
| 2017 | The Last Movie Star | Beautiful Woman #1 | Credited as Jeana Sims |
| 2017 | Sharknado 5: Global Swarming | NATO Delegate Lee | |
| 2017 | Fallen Angel | Grace Albright | TV movie |
| 2018 | Fury of the Fist and the Golden Fleece | Chastity | |
| 2018 | Minutes to Midnight | Tiffani | |
| 2018 | The Price for Silence | Penny | |
| 2018 | Tales of Frankenstein | Gertrude | |
| 2019 | Beneath the Leaves | Alexa | |
| 2021 | Thursday the 12th | Laura Ann | |
| 2022 | Underground - Who & Why? | Aditya | |
| 2023 | Apocalypse Love Story | Adult Sam | |
| 2024 | Nutcrackers | Elf | |

=== Television ===
| Year | Title | Role | Episodes |
|---|---|---|---|
| 2010 | True Jackson, VP | Cheerleader #2 | Episode: "The Boss Ate My Homework" |
| 2010 | CSI: Crime Scene Investigation | Scorecard Girl (uncredited) | Episode: "Long Ball" |
| 2010 | Leverage | Waitress (uncredited) | Episode: "The Zanzibar Marketplace Job" |
| 2010 | The Vampire Diaries | Cherie | Episode: "Isobel" |
| 2010 | Entourage | Flight Attendant (uncredited) | Episode: "Buzzed" |
| 2010 | Dexter | Masuka's Date (uncredited) | Episode: "The Big One" |
| 2011 | One Tree Hill | Tracy | Episode: "I Think I'm Gonna Like It Here" |
| 2011 | Volcano: The Series | Hot Girl | Episode: "Boyfriend Is Back" |
| 2013 | The Silicon Assassin Project | Southern Assassin | Episode: "Dead Reckoning" |
| 2015 | Halt and Catch Fire | Club Goer (uncredited) | Episode: "Limbo" |
| 2015 | Your Pretty Face Is Going to Hell | Emma | Episode: "National Lampoon's Fireballz" |
| 2015 | Satisfaction | Paige | Episode: "...Through Expansion" |
| 2016 | Powers | Devil Girl | Episode: "Funeral of the Century" |
| 2016 | The Eric Andre Show | Guantanamo Babe | Episode: "Warren G; Kelly Osbourne" |
| 2022 | Now and Then | Barman | Episode: "A Good Day to Give Thanks" |

| Preceded by Brittany Sharp | Miss Georgia Teen USA; 2007 | Succeeded by Shannon Geraghty |
