= Miss Kansas Teen USA =

Beauty pageant competition

- Formation: 1983
- Type: Beauty pageant
- Headquarters: Shawnee
- Location: Kansas
- Members: Miss Teen USA
- Official language: English
- Key people: John M. Vannatta; Jason Vannatta; Jennifer Vannatta-Fisher, State Pageant Director
- Website: Official Website

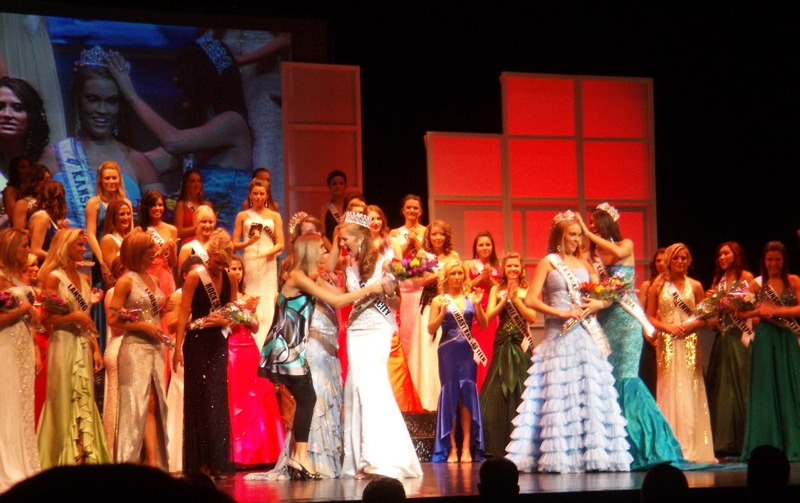
At the conclusion of the Miss Kansas USA and Miss Kansas Teen USA 2008 pageant held in Lawrence, Kansas in December 2007, Jessie Colonna is crowned by Jaymie Stokes (right)

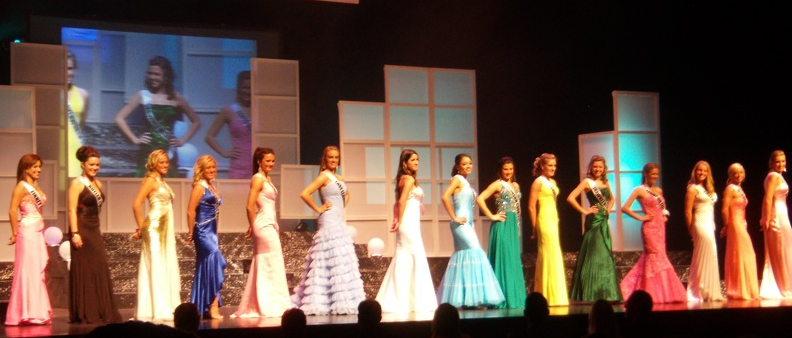
Miss Kansas Teen USA 2008 semi-finalists in evening gowns

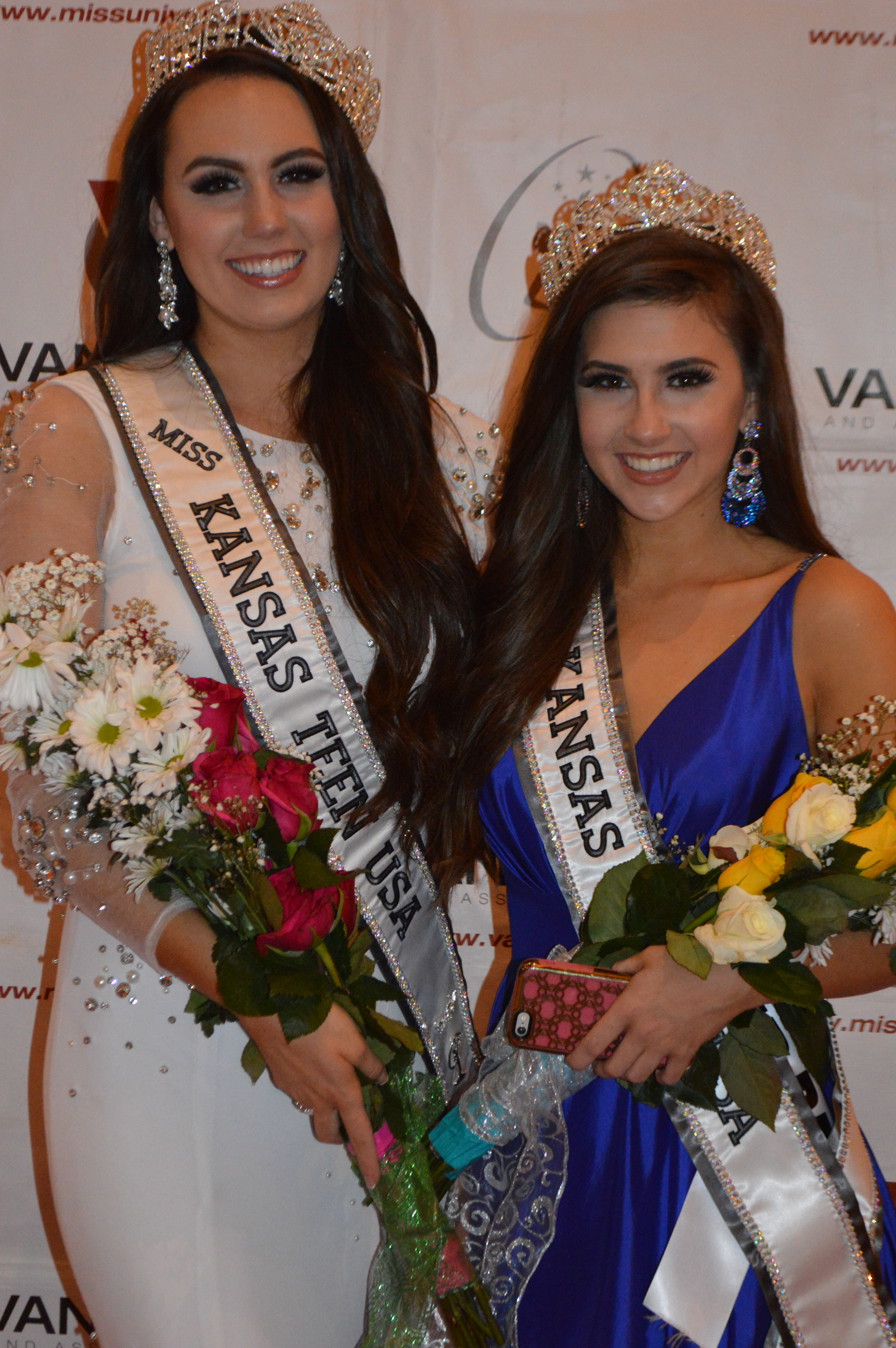
Madison Moore (Miss Kansas Teen USA 2016) crowns her sister Malerie Moore as Miss Kansas Teen USA 2017. This is the first consecutive back-to-back crowning of sisters in Kansas and only the 3rd time in the history of the Miss Universe Organization at that time.

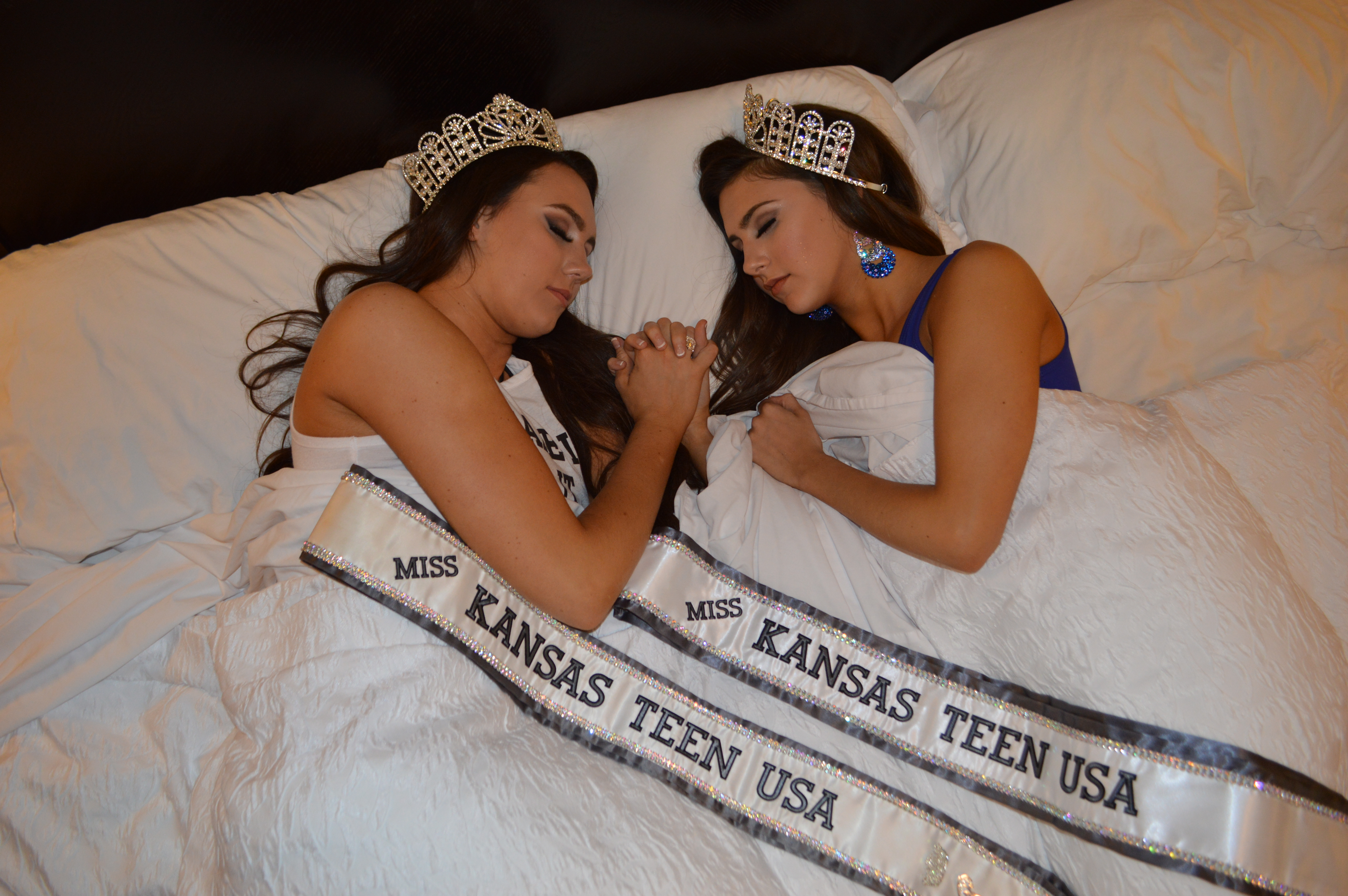
Malerie Moore is crowned by her sister Madison as Miss Kansas Teen USA 2017.

The Miss Kansas Teen USA competition is the pageant that selects the representative for the state of Kansas in the Miss Teen USA pageant. This pageant has been part of the Vanbros organisation since 1992, and in 2006, they celebrated their fifteen-year anniversary with a reunion of former titleholders at the 2007 pageant. For the first time, all the judges for both the Miss Kansas USA and Miss Kansas Teen USA pageants were former titleholders from the Vanbros states: Kansas, Missouri, Oklahoma and Nebraska.

Prior to 1994, the pageant was held concurrently with the Miss Kansas USA event, which was hosted by Kansas City. In 1994, the pageant was moved to Wichita. In 2000, the pageant directors moved the event to the small town of Maize, just outside Wichita, where it was also held the following year, before it was brought back to Wichita proper from 2002 to 2003. The pageant was held in Overland Park for the first time in 2004 and also in 2005. In 2006, it moved to Lawrence.

Kansas had a slow start at Miss Teen USA, and did not place until 1991. Despite this, they placed extremely well in the 1990s, with one semi-finalist placing, one finalist placing, two 2nd runner-up placings and one winner, and were in fact the second highest placed state in that decade. Latasha Laine Lawrie brought Kansas back into the placings in the 21st century with her finalist placing in 2005. She also won the Miss Photogenic award, the only major award won by a Kansas teen.

Eight Kansas teens have gone on to win the Miss Kansas USA crown. The most successful, and most notable of these was Danielle Boatwright, who placed 2nd runner-up to Miss Teen USA, 1st runner-up to Miss USA and won the reality TV show Survivor: Guatemala.

In 1995, Keylee Sue Sanders won the national crown in Wichita, Kansas making Kansas the only state to win the Miss USA and Miss Teen USA titles in their home state.

Dia Kearney of Wichita was crowned Miss Kansas Teen USA 2026 on June 7, 2026, at Polsky Theater in Overland Park. She will represent Kansas at Miss Teen USA 2026.

== Results summary ==
=== Placements ===
- Miss Teen USA: Keylee Sue Sanders (1995), Hailey Colborn (2018)
- 2nd runners-up: Danielle "Danni" Boatwright (1992), Melissa Hurtig (1994)
- 3rd runners-up: Taylor Clark (2011)
- Top 6: Mariah Bergmann (1997)
- Top 10: LaTasha Lawrie (2005), Gentry Miller (2006), Jaymie Stokes (2007)
- Top 12: Denise Blatchford (1991)
- Top 15/16: Katie Taylor (2012), Alyssa Klinzing (2013), Hannah DeBok (2019), Gracie Hendrickson (2022)

Kansas holds a record of 14 placements at Miss Teen USA.

=== Awards ===
- Miss Photogenic: LaTasha Lawrie (2005)
- Style Award: Mandy Carraway (1996)
- Best in Activewear: Brilee Garret (2024)
- Best in Interview: Brilee Garret (2024)

== Winners ==
- Declared as Winner
- Ended as runner-up
- Ended as one of the finalists or semifinalists

Year	Name	Hometown	Age^{1}	Local title	Placement at Miss Teen USA	Special awards at Miss Teen USA	Notes
2026	Dia Kearney	Wichita	18	Miss ICT Teen			
2025	Emma Mayfield	Overland Park	18	Miss South Central KS Teen			
2024	Brilee Garret	Wichita	17	Miss ICT Teen	Top 10	Best in Interview Best in Activewear	
2023	Riley Steinman	Shawnee	19	Miss Shawnee Teen			
2022	Gracie Hendrickson	Newton	17	Miss Harvey County Teen	Top 16		Previously Princess of America Junior Ambassador 2018; Previously Miss Kansas' Outstanding Teen 2021
2021	Madilynn Becker	Herington	17	Miss Herington Teen			Later Miss Kansas USA 2026
2020	Cyara Heredia	Liberal	18	Miss Liberal Teen			
2019	Hannah DeBok	Olathe	17	Miss West Olathe Teen	Top 15		
2018	Hunter Fraley	Pittsburg	18	Miss Pittsburg Teen	Did not compete		Originally first runner-up, succeeded Colborn when she won Miss Teen USA 2018
2018	Hailey Colborn	Wichita	17	Miss Greater Wichita Teen	Miss Teen USA 2018		
2017	Malerie Moore	Olathe	16	Miss South Overland Park Teen			Sister of Miss Kansas Teen USA 2016, Madison Moore
2016	Madison Moore	Olathe	17	Miss Olathe Teen			Sister of Miss Kansas Teen USA 2017, Malerie Moore
2015	Melanie Shaner	Overland Park	17	Miss Johnson County Teen			Later Miss Kansas USA 2018
2014	Claire-Bailey Lee	Andover	17	Miss Andover Teen			Daughter of Miss Kansas USA 1986, Audra Ockerman
2013	Alyssa Klinzing	Olathe	15	Miss Kansas City Teen	Top 16		Later Miss Kansas USA 2019; Top 10 at Miss USA 2019
2012	Katie Taylor	Olathe	18	Miss Southern Johnson County Teen	Top 16		
2011	Taylor Clark	Topeka	17	Miss Topeka Teen	3rd runner-up		
2010	Olivia Harlan	Mission Hills	17	Miss Johnson County Teen			A reporter on ESPN and the SEC Network, Daughter of Kevin Harlan, an American television sports announcer and granddaughter of Bob Harlan, former Green Bay Packers executive
2009	Alexis Rewalt	Olathe	18	Miss Johnson County Teen			Later Miss Kansas United States 2013
2008	Jessie Colonna	Leawood	17	Miss East Leawood Teen			
2007	Jaymie Stokes	Lenexa	16	Miss Lenexa Teen	Top 10		Later Miss Kansas USA 2011
2006	Gentry Linn Miller	Wichita	18	Miss Mid Kansas Teen	Top 10		Later Miss Kansas USA 2012
2005	LaTasha Lawrie	Wichita	18	Miss Wichita Teen	Top 10	Miss Photogenic	
2004	Carissa Dawn Kelley	Winfield	17	Miss Winfield Teen			Later Miss Kansas 2011
2003	Megan Price	Garden City	18	Miss Garden City Teen			
2002	Amber Nicole Ross	Manhattan	17	Miss Manhattan Teen			
2001	Lindsey Mackey	Olathe	16	Miss S. Johnson County Teen			
2000	Sarah Collett Jump	Wichita	16				Contestant at National Sweetheart 2005
1999	Grace Shibley	Wichita	19				
1998	Ashley Tessendorf	Manhattan	17	Miss Manhattan Teen			
1997	Mariah Bergmann	Haysville	18		Top 6		
1996	Mandy Carraway	Wichita	18	Miss Central Kansas Teen		Style Award	Later Miss Kansas USA 1999; Mother of Miss Teen USA 2025 Mailyn Marsh
1995	Keylee Sue Sanders	Louisburg	18	Miss Lawrence Teen	Miss Teen USA 1995		Former co-director of the Miss California USA and Miss California Teen USA pageants under her married name, Keylee Sanders-Hochberg
1994	Melissa Hurtig	Courtland	18		2nd runner-up		
1993	Christy Dippre	Augusta	17	Miss Augusta Teen			
1992	Danielle "Danni" Boatwright	Tonganoxie	17		2nd runner-up		Later Miss Kansas USA 1996; 1st runner up at Miss USA 1996; Sports broadcaster and winner of Survivor: Guatemala
1991	Denise Blatchford	Arkansas City	17		Semi-finalist		
1990	Carrie Williams	Wichita	18				
1989	Tracey Knop	Wichita	19				
1988	Jennifer Estes	Wichita	19				
1987	Stephanie Resnick	Whitewater	17				
1986	Kimberlee E. Girrens	Wichita	18				Later Miss Kansas USA 1992, Top 6 finalist at Miss USA 1992; Mrs. Kansas America 2004 under her married name, Kimberlee Easter.
1985	Tammy Lampton	Wichita	15				
1984	Nancy Mardis	Wichita	16				
1983	Melissa Lyczak	Russell	16				

^{1} Age at the time of the Miss Teen USA pageant
