= Miss Teen USA 2000 =

18th edition of the Miss Teen USA competition

- Date: August 26, 2000
- Presenters: Brian McFayden; Ali Landry; Julie Moran
- Entertainment: Rachel Lampa; 98 Degrees; Westlife
- Venue: Hirsch Memorial Coliseum, Shreveport, Louisiana
- Broadcaster: CBS; KSLA
- Entrants: 51
- Placements: 10
- Winner: Jillian Parry; Pennsylvania
- Congeniality: Shari Short; Idaho
- Photogenic: Kristen Johnson; Kentucky

Miss Teen USA 2000, the 18th Miss Teen USA pageant, was televised live from Shreveport, Louisiana on August 26, 2000. At the conclusion of the final competition, Jillian Parry of Pennsylvania was crowned by outgoing queen Ashley Coleman of Delaware.

The pageant was hosted by newcomer Brian McFayden with color commentary by Ali Landry and Julie Moran for the third year. Landry held the Miss Louisiana Teen USA 1990, Miss Louisiana USA 1996 and Miss USA 1996 titles, making the semi-finals at Miss Teen USA 1990 pageant before winning Miss USA 1996.

During the pageant there were performances by Rachel Lampa, 98 Degrees and Westlife.

== Results ==
=== Placements ===
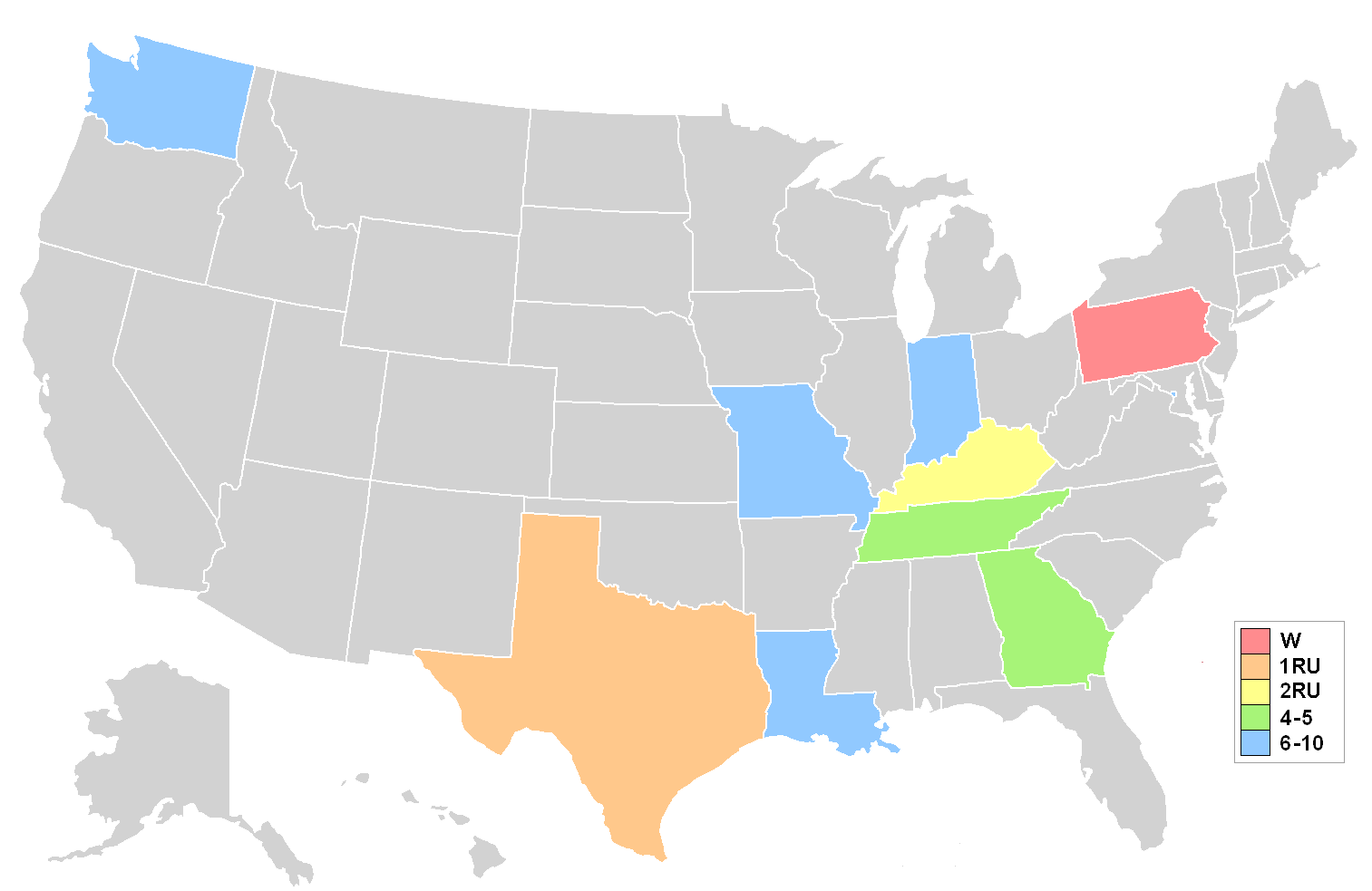
Map showing placements by state

Final results	Contestant
Miss Teen USA 2000	Pennsylvania – Jillian Parry
1st Runner-Up	Texas – Nicole O'Brian
2nd Runner-Up	Kentucky – Kristen Johnson
Top 5	Tennessee – Casey Porter; (Georgia (U.S. state)) Georgia – Abby Vaillancourt
Top 10	Louisiana – Jonine "Nina" Moch; (Washington (state)) Washington – Megan Munroe; (Washington, D.C.) District of Columbia – Tiara Dews; Indiana – Kera Boog; Missouri – Caitlin McIntosh

=== Special awards ===
- Miss Congeniality: Shari Short (Idaho)
- Miss Photogenic: Kristen Johnson (Kentucky)
- Style Award: Abby Vaillancourt (Georgia)
- Best in Swimsuit: Nicole O'Brian (Texas)

=== Final competition score ===
Country	Swimsuit	Evening Gown	Average	Finalists
Pennsylvania	9.26(2)	9.39(1)	9.33(2)	9.43(2)
Texas	9.34(1)	9.33(3)	9.34(1)	9.37(3)
Kentucky	9.07(5)	9.26(4)	9.17(5)	9.54(1)
Tennessee	9.26(2)	9.26(4)	9.26(3)	9.22(4)
Georgia	9.14(4)	9.37(2)	9.26(3)	9.14(5)
Louisiana	9.05(6)	9.04(8)	9.05(6)	
Washington	8.90(7)	9.11(6)	9.01(7)	
District of Columbia	8.77(9)	9.08(7)	8.93(8)	
Indiana	8.82(8)	8.88(10)	8.85(9)	
Missouri	8.72(10)	8.90(9)	8.81(10)	

Legend
Winner
First runner-up
Second runner-up
Finalists

=== Historical significance ===
- This was the first placement for Georgia since Whitney Fuller placed first runner-up, ending its largest period without a placement. Indiana also recorded its first placement since Nicolette VanHook was a semi-finalist in 1994.
- Pennsylvania placed for the first time since 1996, when Patricia Campell placed first runner-up to Christie Lee Woods). Missouri also placed for the first time since 1996.
- The District of Columbia placed for the first time since 1987 and Washington for the first time since 1989.

== Host city ==
The pageant was held in Shreveport, Louisiana for the third consecutive year. Following the event, officials in indicated that they were reluctant to host the pageant for a fourth year because disorganization by the Miss Universe Organization meant that the city lost over $70,000 in expected revenue.

== Contestant notes ==
- Chelsea Cooley, a non-finalist in the pageant, later won the Miss USA 2005 title as Miss North Carolina USA. She placed 11th in the preliminaries, missing the cut by a slight margin.
- Miss Oregon Teen USA Kari Virding, a non-finalist in the pageant, later won the Miss Oregon 2007 crown.
- Kristen Johnson, who placed second runner-up at Miss Teen USA 2000, placed second runner-up to Cooley at Miss USA 2005. She later appeared in the reality television show Treasure Hunters.
- First runner-up Nicole O'Brian won the Miss Texas USA title less than two years after passing on her Teen title, and later placed second runner-up at Miss USA 2003. Nicole later went on to compete on the fifth season of the Emmy award winning CBS reality show The Amazing Race with her then boyfriend Brandon Davidson. The duo finished in third place. Another TX pageant alumni, Christie Woods, competed on the same season with her boyfriend Colin.
- Ashley Marble went on to compete in Miss Maine USA 2011, eleven years after participating in Teen. Marble placed first runner-up in the pageant, but had the opportunity to compete in Miss USA 2011 after the original winner resigned. Ultimately, Marble placed in the top 8 of the pageant, after failing to make the semifinals at Miss Teen USA.
- In a rare occurrence, Christina Olensjack won the Miss Alaska USA 2002 title only one year after giving up her Teen crown.
- Others who competed in Miss USA pageants were Tiara Dews (District of Columbia, 2004), Kristin George (Wyoming, 2006), and Raelene Aguilar (New Mexico, 2008).
- Kimberly Williamson, Miss Illinois Teen USA, died on December 27, 2004. The cause of her death was unknown. Williamson, who was 23 and living in Knoxville, Tennessee, when she died, was a gemologist who hosted a show on Jewelry Television.
- Tina Casciani was originally the first runner-up to Miss New York Teen USA 2000, Emily Pollack. Emily arrived in Shreveport but days later left for reasons unknown. Tina then flew down to take over duties as Miss New York Teen USA and compete in the pageant.
- It was confirmed by the VanBros organization, the sponsors of the Miss Missouri Teen USA and Miss Kansas Teen USA pageants, that Caitlin McIntosh won the preliminary interview competition and that Sarah Jump, Miss Kansas Teen USA, finished in the top 15.
