= Katie Miller =

American political advisor (born 1991)

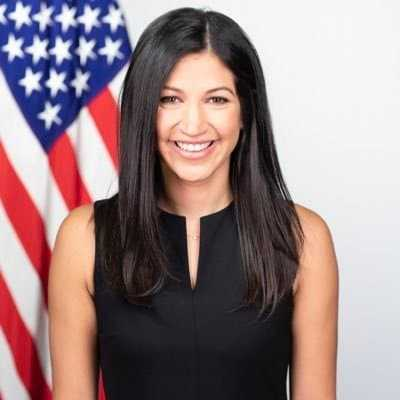
- Official portrait, 2020

Communications Director to the Vice President
- In office May 27, 2020 – January 20, 2021
- Vice President: Mike Pence
- Preceded by: Jarrod Agen
- Succeeded by: Ashley Etienne

Press Secretary to the Vice President
- In office October 1, 2019 – May 27, 2020
- Vice President: Mike Pence
- Preceded by: Alyssa Farah
- Succeeded by: Devin O'Malley

Personal details
- Born: Katie Rose Waldman; October 4, 1991 (age 35)
- Party: Republican
- Spouse: Stephen Miller (m. 2020)
- Children: 4
- Education: University of Florida (BA); George Washington University (MPA)

Katie Rose Miller (née Waldman; born October 4, 1991) is an American political advisor and podcaster who served as the communications director to the vice president from 2020 to 2021 and the press secretary to the vice president from 2019 to 2020.

Miller graduated from the University of Florida in 2014. She began working for the National Republican Senatorial Committee that year, and later Montana senator Steve Daines as his communications director. In 2017, Miller began serving as an assistant press secretary at the Department of Homeland Security. She left the position in February 2019 to serve as Arizona senator Martha McSally's communications director. In September, vice president Mike Pence named Miller as his press secretary. She became Pence's communications director in May 2020.

In January 2025, Miller became the communications director for the Department of Government Efficiency. After her tenure elapsed in May, she remained with the initiative's leader, Elon Musk. In August, Miller announced a podcast for Republican women. She is married to Stephen Miller, the White House Chief of Staff.

== Early life and education ==
Katie Rose Waldman was born on October 4, 1991. Waldman was the second child of Glenn and Sheryl Waldman. Glenn was a litigator and a Republican donor. The Waldmans, an affluent Jewish family, moved from Miami, Florida, to Weston in 1994. Waldman attended Cypress Bay High School, where she was a photo editor for the school's newspaper.

She began attending the University of Florida, where she pledged Alpha Omicron Pi in 2010. Waldman was involved in the university's student government as a member of the dominant Unite Party; former students told Vanity Fair and Slate that her approach to politics was cut-throat, and The New York Times reported that she had garnered a reputation as a secretive operative. In February 2012, after Florida Gators head coach Will Muschamp endorsed an opposition candidate, Waldman and another student disposed of newspapers reporting on Muschamp's endorsement. The incident caused a controversy within the university. Waldman remained anonymous until she was named by her accomplice in his apology, printed in The Independent Florida Alligator. After the killing of Trayvon Martin that month, she blocked a resolution to commemorate his death. Waldman graduated from the University of Florida in 2014. She later received a master's degree in public administration from George Washington University.

== Career ==
=== Communications work (2014–2021) ===
By March 2014, Waldman had begun working for the National Republican Senatorial Committee as a press assistant. She later worked for Montana senator Steve Daines as his press secretary. In November 2017, Waldman began working for the Department of Homeland Security as an assistant press secretary. She later served as a deputy press secretary for the department. As the Trump administration's family separation policy mounted in 2018, Waldman falsely claimed that immigration officials were not separating children from families, as they did under the Obama administration. Waldman and Stephen Miller, a senior advisor to the president and the director of speechwriting, sought to reinstate the policy, according to Vanity Fair. She left the position in February 2019 to serve as Arizona senator Martha McSally's communications director. In September, Waldman became vice president Mike Pence's press secretary.

In February 2020, Waldman married Miller at Trump International Hotel Washington, D.C. President Donald Trump attended their wedding. Miller and Waldman met through mutual friends in 2018 and were engaged a year-and-a-half later. They have four children together. That month, Trump established the White House Coronavirus Task Force, appointing Pence as its chair. Katie moved to enforce a layer of communication between the task force and the public through her office; she was closely involved in its broad operations. In May, Miller tested positive for COVID-19. Her diagnosis was initially concealed until Trump identified her publicly. According to The New York Times, Trump was "annoyed" that Miller had contracted the virus and imposed mask requirements for White House employees. That month, Pence promoted Miller to communications director. Near the conclusion of Trump's term—and as Trump publicly feuded with Pence, culminating in calls for violence against him by participants of the January 6 Capitol attack—Miller was on maternity leave.

=== Post-government activities and Musk (2021–2025) ===
Miller remained with Pence after the inauguration of Joe Biden. According to The New York Times, Miller was still employed by Pence to collect healthcare benefits, but was later fired over her husband's continued work with Trump. By October 2022, she had become a spokesperson for the venture capitalist Blake Masters, the Republican candidate for the 2022 Senate election in Arizona. In February 2023, several allies of Florida governor Ron DeSantis and Pence established an organization to pressure Republican state lawmakers to approve infrastructure projects. Miller was appointed to lead its press operation. In September, she joined Phil Cox's P2 Public Affairs as a principal. Miller ran a super PAC for Jack Ciattarelli, a Republican candidate in the 2025 New Jersey gubernatorial election, alongside Kellyanne Conway. In Trump's second presidential transition, Miller served as the media representative for Robert F. Kennedy Jr., Trump's nominee to serve as secretary of health and human services. She told Politico that she did not intend to serve in Trump's second term.

In December 2024, Trump announced that Miller would work for the Department of Government Efficiency, an initiative to cut government spending heralded by Elon Musk. Through P2 Public Affairs, she served as a liaison between Musk's team and Trump's team. Miller continued to work for Kennedy handling communications as he neared the confirmation process. She led communications for the Department of Government Efficiency. Miller was employed at the Department of Government Efficiency as a special government employee, a position that allowed her to continue working for P2 Public Affairs and the lobbyist Jeff Miller, though federal law mandated that she and Musk leave their positions by the end of May. In February 2025, she was named to the President's Intelligence Advisory Board. After The Wall Street Journal reported that Miller was still working for P2 Public Affairs, she took a leave of absence from the company that month. Miller additionally advised Musk at the Department of Government Efficiency. As the initiative's communications director, she ignored reporters that used pronouns in their signatures. According to The New York Times, Miller threatened Leland Dudek, the acting commissioner of Social Security, not to contradict the false figure that scammers were responsible for forty percent of calls to the Social Security Administration.

In May, Musk and Miller left the Trump administration after their tenures as special government employees expired. Days later, Trump and Musk publicly feuded, the Millers' loyalties—Stephen having worked for Trump and Katie having worked for Musk—came into question. According to The New York Times, Miller intended to remain with Musk after he announced he was leaving the Department of Government Efficiency. White House officials believed that Katie was being paid personally by Musk as a special government employee, an arrangement that led to tensions, according to Politico. Questions surrounding the perceived alliances between Musk and the Millers continued after Musk publicly rebuked Grok, a chatbot developed by his company, xAI, for verifying a false post of Musk taunting Stephen. In July, rumors from some Republicans emerged that Katie had distanced herself from Musk after she changed her banner from a SpaceX rocket to an image of her and her children, and after Musk unfollowed Miller on X. Miller told Reuters that she continued to work for him.

=== Podcast and influencer career (2025–present) ===
In August 2025, Miller announced that she would start a weekly podcast for Republican women. She told Axios that her podcast, titled The Katie Miller Podcast, was not exclusively focused on politics and compared it to the podcast Call Her Daddy by Alex Cooper and Sofia Franklyn (2018–present) with a conservative slant. Her initial guests included vice president JD Vance, the former boxer Mike Tyson, and the sports announcer Sage Steele.

Following the 2026 United States intervention in Venezuela and Trump's vow to annex Greenland, Miller posted an image of the map of Greenland with the American flag overlaid within the borders. The post received criticism from Denmark's ambassador to the U.S., Jesper Møller Sørensen, and Greenland's prime minister, Jens-Frederik Nielsen.
