= Gohl =

Gohl is a surname. Notable people with this surname include:

- Andreas Gohl (born 1994), Austrian freestyle skier
- Billy Gohl (1873–1927), German-American serial killer
- Christiane Gohl (born 1958), German author
- Christopher Gohl (born 1974), German politician
- Jakob Gohl, also known as Jacobus Golius
- Janey Gohl (born 1956), American beauty queen
- Matthias Gohl, Swiss music producer

== See also ==
- Geul river
- Göhl, Germany
