= Latuff =

Latuff is a surname. Notable people with the surname include:

- Carlos Latuff (born 1968), Brazilian political cartoonist
- Rachel Latuff (born 1991), American educator and beauty pageant titleholder
