= Blockout (disambiguation) =

Blockout may refer to:

- Blockout, a 1989 video game
- Blockout 2024, an online campaign to block the social media accounts of celebrities
- Block Out (band), a Serbian band formed in the 1990s
