= Sarah Cahill =

Sarah Cahill may refer to:

- Sarah Cahill (model) (born 1978), American model, actress, and beauty pageant titleholder
- Sarah Cahill (pianist) (born 1960), American pianist
