= Miss Minnesota USA =

Beauty pageant competition

- Formation: 1952; 74 years ago
- Type: Beauty pageant
- Headquarters: Savage
- Location: Minnesota
- Members: Miss USA
- Official language: English
- Key people: Kelly McCoy
- Website: Official website

The Miss Minnesota USA competition is the pageant that selects the representative for the state of Minnesota in the Miss USA pageant. It was directed by Future Productions based in Savage, Minnesota since its inception in 1995 to 2024, which also directs the state pageants for Colorado, Iowa, North Dakota, South Dakota, Wisconsin and Wyoming.

Barbara Elaine Peterson was the first Miss Minnesota USA to be crowned Miss USA (in 1976), and was also the first Miss USA to not place in the Miss Universe pageant. Her sister, Polly Peterson Bowles, was Miss Minnesota USA 1981.

In 2016, Halima Aden became the first contestant to compete wearing a burkini, and the first to wear a hijab the entire time. In 2017, Mikayla Holmgren was the first woman with Down syndrome to compete in a statewide Miss USA pageant.

The current titleholder is Rachel Betterley of Prior Lake was crowned Miss Minnesota USA on May 30, 2026, at The Franklin Center in Des Moines. She will represent Minnesota at Miss USA 2026.

== Gallery of titleholders ==
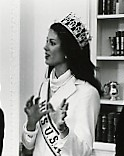
Barbara Peterson, Miss Minnesota USA 1976 & Miss USA 1976

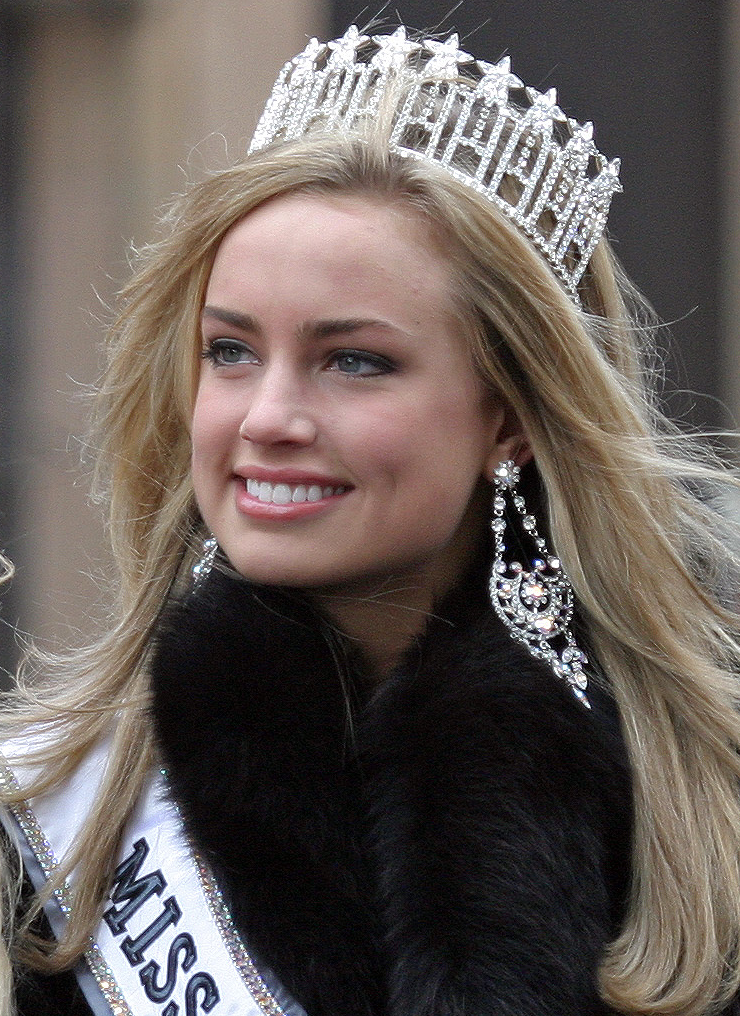
Kaylee Unverzagt, Miss Minnesota USA 2008

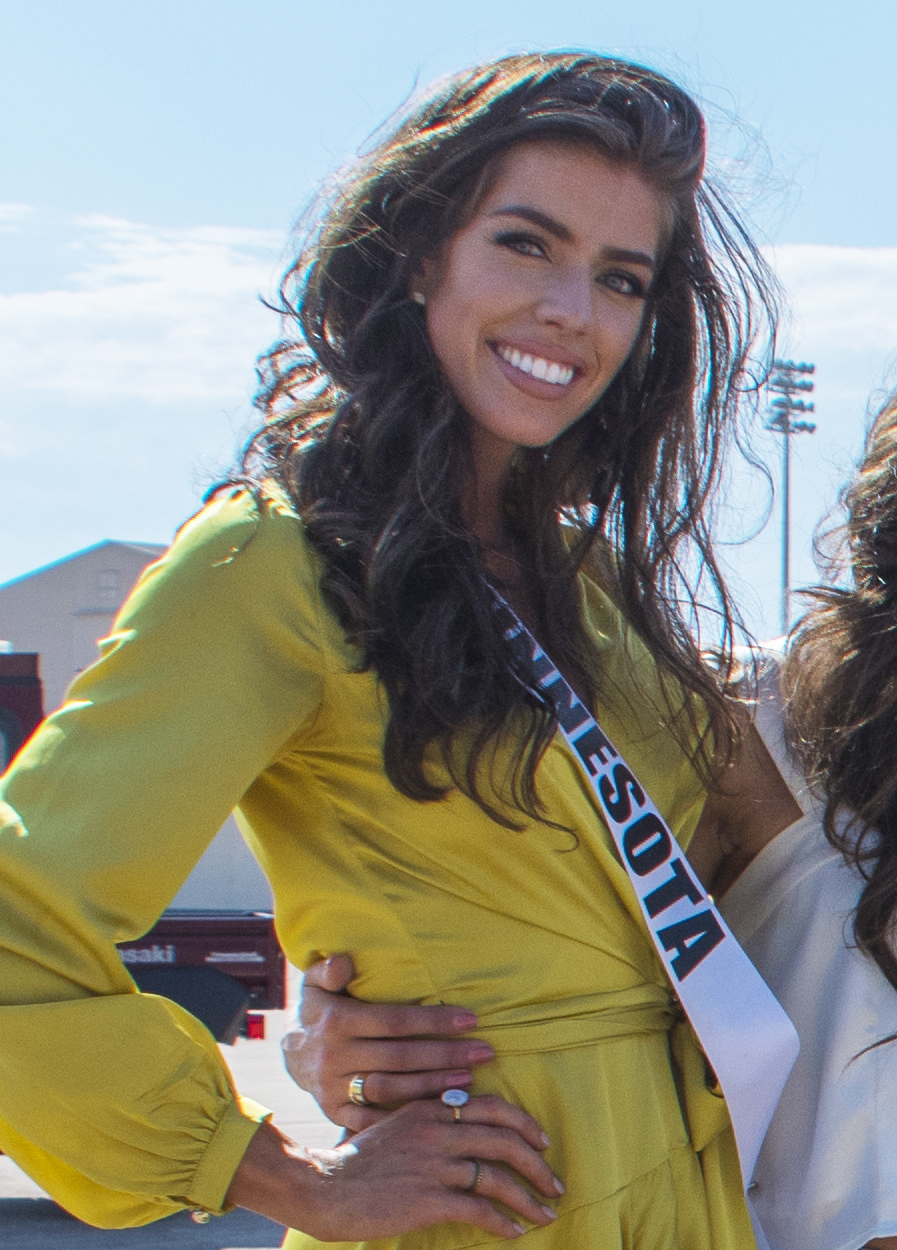
Kalie Wright, Miss Minnesota USA 2018

== Results summary ==
=== Placements ===
- Miss USA: Barbara Peterson (1976)
- 2nd runners-up: Deborah Cossette (1977), Meridith Gould (2017)
- 3rd runner-up: Lanore Van Buren (2002)
- 4th runner-up: Kari Lee Johnson (1985)
- Top 6: Angelique de Maison (1995)
- Top 10/12: Jodell Stirmlinger (1952), Carla Reid Peterson (1980), Jolene Stavrakis (1994), Madeline Helget (2022)
- Top 15/19/20: Mary Ann Papke (1953), Dawn Joyce (1954), Kaylee Unverzagt (2008), Erica Nego (2009), Haley O'Brien (2014), Cat Stanley (2019), Rachel Betterley (2026)

Minnesota holds a record of 17 placements at Miss USA.

=== Awards ===
- Miss Congeniality: Elizabeth Jane Carroll (1965), Janet Tveita (1990), Dottie Cannon (2006)
- Miss Photogenic: Paige Swenson (2000), Sarah Cahill (2003)

== Winners ==
Color key

- Declared as Winner
- Ended as runner-up
- Ended as one of the finalists or semifinalists

Year	Name	Hometown	Age^{1}	Local title	Placement	Special awards	Notes
2026	Rachel Mariew Betterley	Cook	35		Top 20		Previously Miss Minnesota 2015 under her maiden name Rachel Latuff
2025	Megan Rivera	Prior Lake	25	Miss Prior Lake			
2024	Muna Ali	Saint Paul	27	Miss Minnesota City			
2023	Sarah Anderson	Maple Grove	20	Miss Maple Grove			
2022	Madeline Helget	Clearwater	24	Miss Clearwater	Top 12		
2021	Katarina Spasojevic	Minnetonka	20	Miss Minnetonka			Shortest reigning Miss Minnesota USA (9 months and 28 days)
2020	Taylor Fondie	Ham Lake	22				Former Minnesota Vikings Cheerleader; Longest reigning Miss Minnesota USA (1 year and 8 months)
2019	Catherine Elizabeth "Cat" Stanley	Bloomington	23		Top 15		Previously Miss Minnesota Teen USA 2014
2018	Kalie Kathleen Wright	Eagle Bend	24				Previously National Sweetheart 2014; Previously Miss Idaho 2015
2017	Meridith Louise Gould	Minneapolis	22		2nd Runner-Up		Previously Miss South Dakota's Outstanding Teen 2012; Previously Miss South Dakota 2014; Eligible as a student of University of Minnesota at the time of crowning
2016	Bridget Lee Jacobs	Maple Grove	20				
2015	Jessica Lynn Scheu	Prior Lake	23				
2014	Haley Baylee O'Brien	Excelsior	21		Top 20		Previously Miss Minnesota Teen USA 2010; Previously Miss Collegiate America 2012
2013	Danielle Grace Hooper	Inver Grove Heights	20				
2012	Nitaya Panemalaythong	Savage	26				Born in Thailand
2011	Brittany Lee Thelemann	Plymouth	23				Cousin of Olivia Herbert, Miss Minnesota Teen USA 2019
2010	Courtney Kay Basara	Duluth	20				
2009	Yayra Erica Nego	Plymouth	24		Top 15 (12th place)		Later Miss Universe Ghana 2011
2008	Kaylee Unverzagt	Eagan	20		Top 15 (15th place)		
2007	Alla Igorevna Ilushka	Eden Prairie	22				Previously Miss Minnesota Teen USA 2002 and Top 10 at Miss Teen USA 2002
2006	Dottie Cannon	Eagan	22			Miss Congeniality	
2005	Carrie Lee	Sebeka	25				
2004	Jessica Dereschuk	Stacy	20				
2003	Sarah Mae Cahill	Waseca	24			Miss Photogenic	Previously Miss Minnesota Teen USA 1996
2002	Lanore VanBuren	Edina	26		3rd Runner-Up	Bluepoint Apparel Swimsuit and Fitness Award	
2001	Anne Marie Catherine Clausen	Golden Valley	23				
2000	Paige Swenson	Fridley	24			Miss Photogenic	Previously Miss Minnesota Teen USA 1994
1999	Crystal VanDenBerg	Brooklyn Center	19				
1998	Josan Howell Hengen	Eden Prairie	19				
1997	Melissa Hall	Minneapolis					
1996	Karin Smith	Brooklyn Park	25				
1995	Angelique de Maison	St. Louis Park			Finalist (5th place)		
1994	Jolene Stravrakis	Burnsville			Semifinalist (10th place)		
1993	Kristi Bennecke	Anoka					
1992	Amber Rue	Minneapolis					
1991	April Ann Herke	Eden Prairie					
1990	Janet Tveita	Minneapolis				Miss Congeniality	
1989	Julie Knutson	Crystal	22				
1988	Sue Bolich	Mound			N/A^{2}		
1988	Jolene Stavrakis	Apple Valley			N/A^{2}		
1988	Julie Ann Nelson	Bloomington	20				
1987	Christine Ann Rosenberger	South St. Paul	20				
1986	Cynthia Jane Peterson	Edina					
1985	Kari Lee Johnson	Minneapolis	20		4th Runner-Up		
1984	Martha Kay Mork	Edina	22				
1983	Carolyn Mattson	New Hope	22				
1982	Lori Jean Kmetz	New Brighton	21				
1981	Polly Peterson	Edina	22				Sister of Barbara Peterson, Miss USA 1976
1980	Carla Reid Peterson	Albert Lea	19		Top 12		
1979	Cynthia Sue Lee	Saint Paul	21				
1978	Janey Lee Gohl	St. Cloud					
1977	Deborah Jean "Debra" Cossette	Minneapolis			2nd Runner-Up		
1976	Barbara Elaine Peterson	Edina			Miss USA 1976		Sister of Polly Peterson, Miss Minnesota USA 1981; Non-semi-finalist at Miss Universe 1976
1975	Dawn Carol LaMotte	St. Paul					
1974	Gayle Johnson	Minneapolis					
1973	Cyndi James	Minneapolis					
1972	Darlene Koskiniemi	Roseville					
1971	Shirley Kittleson	Sherburn	23				
1970	Sally Strickland	St. Paul					
1969	Laureen Darling	Minneapolis					
1968	Arlene Larson	Minneapolis					
1967	Betty Ann Brewer	Richfield					
1966	Patricia Thatcher	Austin					
1965	Elizabeth Jane Carroll	Bloomington				Miss Congeniality	
1960-64	No Representative						
1959	Muriel Fairbanks	Minneapolis	23				
1958	Sue Bouchard	Minneapolis	19				
1957	Mary Margaret Ford	Minneapolis	18				
1956	Marilyn Johnson	Minneapolis	18				
1955	Sally Ann Colombo	Stillwater	18				
1954	Dawn Joyce	Minneapolis	20		Semifinalist (Top 19)		
1953	Mary Ann Papke	Minneapolis	20		Semifinalist (Top 20)		
1952	Jodell Stirmlinger	Saint Paul			Semifinalist (Top 10)		

^{1} Age at the time of the Miss USA pageant
^{2} Contestant resigned title before the Miss USA pageant
