= Celebrity influence in politics =

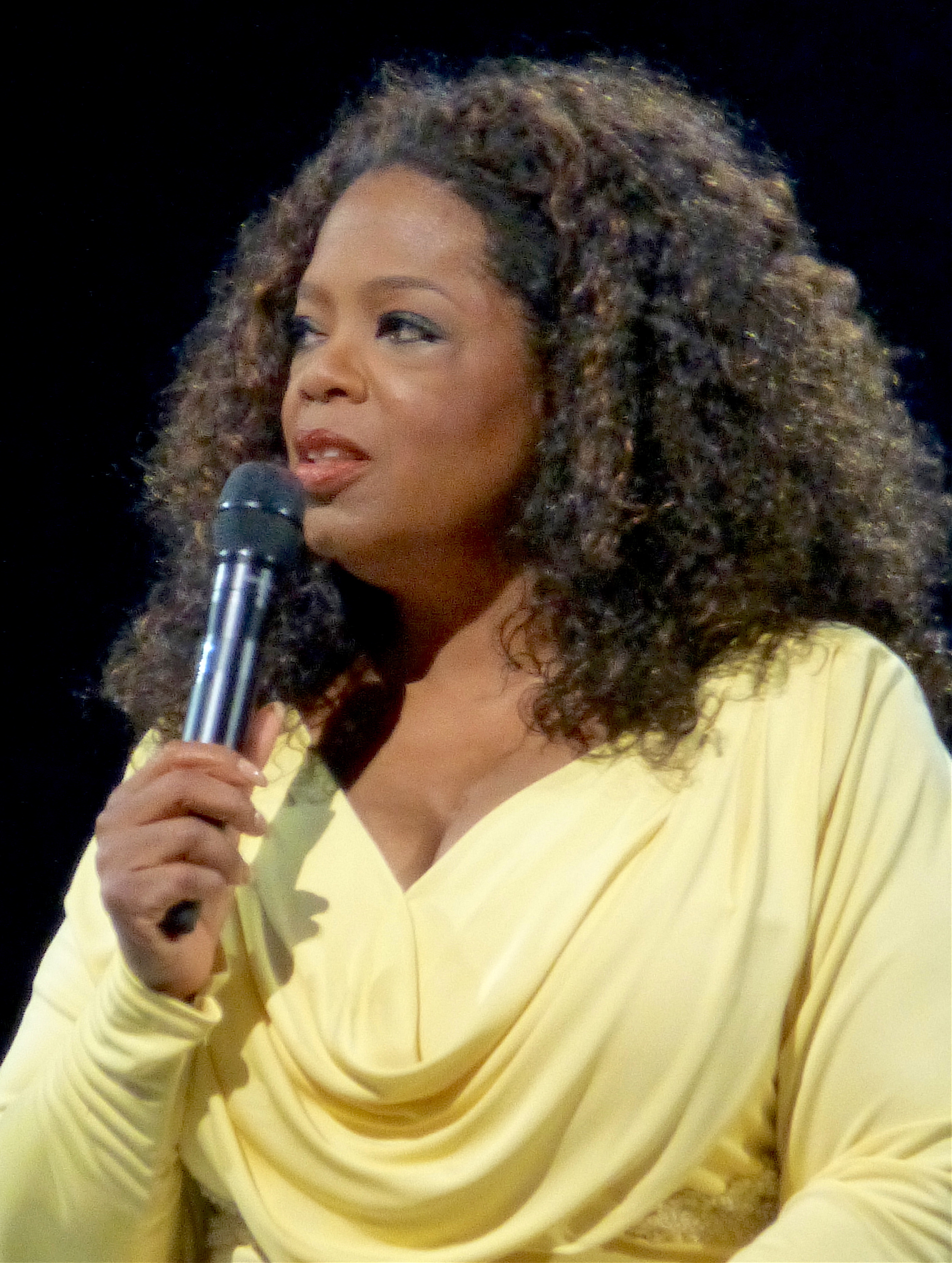
Celebrities and media personas such as Oprah Winfrey have become active in politics, with Winfrey endorsing Barack Obama's presidential campaign in 2008.

Celebrity influence in politics, also referred to as "celebrity politics," or "political star power," is the act of a prominent person using their fame as a platform to influence others on political issues or ideology. According to Anthony Elliott, celebrity is a central structuring point in self and social identification, per-forming as it does an increasingly important role in self-framings, self-imaginings, self-revisions and self-reflection. The influential people considered celebrities can be anyone with a major following such as professional athletes, actors/actresses, television personalities or musicians. Celebrities have two kinds of specific power: the abilities to shed light on issues and to persuade audiences. Social media is one of the most common areas for celebrities to discuss specific issues or current events that are being politicized; the individuals may also speak out in public forums such as television talk shows, events, or during their own widely attended performances. In the United States, most celebrities tend to hold liberal and left-wing political beliefs, often supporting the Democratic Party, for reasons that are debated by social psychologists, although many conservative celebrities have also supported Republican candidates, particularly Donald Trump.

== History ==
=== The use of media ===
The adoption of wide-reaching mediums has made it easier for celebrities to exert influence in politics that began with the creation of television. According to John Street, celebrity influence in politics began with television, as the medium is intimate and focused more on the human side of people, including political candidates, than any other medium. He further states that celebrities were able to use television to reach a wide audience and that their influence affected others' understandings of certain topics. As different mediums emerged, such as social media, where celebrities could voice their opinions on various topics, their influence had a greater effect. Mark Wheeler has opined that this led to one of the main critiques of celebrity involvement in politics in that celebrities could be viewed as a manufactured product, one fabricated through media exposure.

=== Examples of celebrities in politics ===
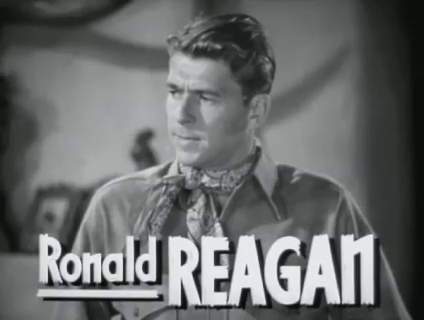
Ronald Reagan acted in films such as The Bad Man before being elected governor of California, and later president of the United States.

Celebrities such as movie stars, professional athletes, musicians, and reality television stars have campaigned for and against political parties, candidates, and on political issues. Examples include Oprah Winfrey and George Clooney endorsing Barack Obama's presidential campaign in 2008 and a song written by American musician Hank Williams Jr. endorsing Senator John McCain's campaign in the same election. Prior to winning the 2016 United States presidential election, President Donald Trump was a businessman and television personality who actively appeared on Fox News to discuss politics and endorsed political candidates. Michael Higgins concludes that Trump's media-centered politics amounts to a "pseudo presidency", confounding orthodox forms of political accountability. According to John Street, this is evident in how he is represented, how he performs and how his 'fans' respond to him. It is also symptomatic of wider changes in the conduct and form of the contemporary, mediatised political realm. In India, Amitabh Bachchan and Smriti Irani have campaigned for various political parties and positions. Selena Gomez wrote an essay expressing her opinion on immigration, detailing her family's past immigration background. Gomez addresses the struggles of immigration to the United States and talks about how its more than just a political issue. Reality T.V. star, entrepreneur and influencer, Kim Kardashian West has also used her celebrity influence to get the opportunity to talk with President Donald Trump and advocate for him to grant clemency for Alice Marie Johnson, who was sentenced to life in prison for a first time drug offense. Since then she has helped with the release of Momolu Stewart, Crystal Munos, Judith Negron, and Tynice Hall to name a few. She has also helped establish a partnership between a prison reform initiative, #cut50, and Lyft to help released inmates get reliable transportation to job interviews. Her legal journey can be seen in the documentary, The Justice Project, in which she claims that, "I want to help elevate these cases to a national level to effect change, and this documentary is an honest depiction of me learning about the system and helping bring tangible results to justice reform.”

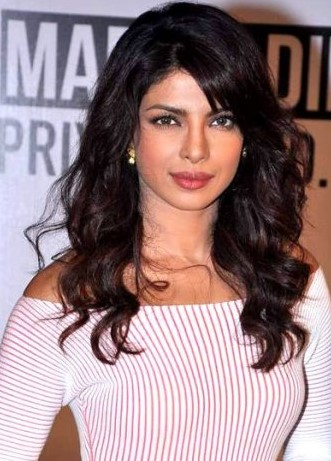
Priyanka Chopra is an avid supporter of UNICEF and partakes within the celebrity program. This picture takes place during the mobile application release date of UNICEF's application.

There are multiple cases of celebrities who have performed well in the polls and have become important political figures in their respective countries. Examples include Austrian-American bodybuilder and movie star Arnold Schwarzenegger, Italian comedian Beppe Grillo, Israeli television host Yair Lapid, Brazilian singer and composer Gilberto Gil, and Panamanian salsa singer and actor Rubén Blades.

=== Ideology ===
In the United States, celebrities tend to be liberal. Some scientists have argued that artistic individuals tend to hold liberal leanings, because liberalism and creativity go hand in hand, whereas conservatives tend to work in business and the military. The Friends of Abe was a support group for conservatives in Hollywood.

=== Celebrities within ambassadorial programs and organizations ===
Various organizations and programs employ the celebrity limelight in order to interact and engage with their fanbase. UNICEF is a policy organization branching from the United Nations. According to the UNICEF website, it utilizes their celebrity ambassadorial program in order to gain public recognition. Film, television, sports, and social media stars collaborate to "raise awareness" and "fundraise, advocate, and educate on behalf of UNICEF". Alyssa Milano, P!nk, Gigi Hadid, and other influential persons all claim positions within this program and assist its mission statement, this being providing special protection for the children most disadvantaged. Although this organization is the most politically present, there are various other examples of organizations and programs utilizing this very format in order to achieve their political goals.

=== Examples of politicians in televised networks ===
In the fifth episode ("2016") of season three of the Comedy Central show Broad City, the main characters encounter and openly support and gush over the 2016 presidential candidate, Hillary Clinton. The episode was written by Chris Kelly and directed by Todd Biermann. Although it was publicly specified as an episode that was not meant to be political, the show's characters displayed a clear support for said candidate. The show was originally created and scripted by Ilana Glazer and Abbi Jacobson, two comedians who regularly utilize their social media platforms to speak on political topics. This episode aired on March 16, 2016, in the midst of the presidential campaign.

The twenty-second episode ("Moving Up") of the sixth season of Parks and Recreation featured a brief cameo by the first lady, Michelle Obama. This episode aired on April 24, 2014, well within President Barack Obama’s time in office. Written by Aisha Muharrar & Alan Yang and directed by Michael Schur, the episode featured the first lady convincing the main character, Leslie Knope, to move forward with her decision to work in Chicago, Illinois. Leslie Knope is portrayed by Amy Poehler, a comedian who also starred within SNL and several films.

There are several other cases of politicians utilizing televised networks and celebrity affiliation to increase polling opinion and public interest.

=== Social media celebrities ===
Social media has risen as a platform for stardom utilized by average individuals. Many teenagers, children, and adults have amassed a public following on platforms such as TikTok and YouTube. YouTube, for example, is believed to have accumulated over 2 billion users in 2025, globally. This statistic alone depicts the number of people that such an app reaches, being an easy target for those who aim to grow a platform, create content, and/or exert a message for viewers. These platforms have even given names to such stars who have received a large amount of media attention. A name that has become increasingly infamous across all platforms (Facebook and Amazon Prime Video included) is MrBeast, a multimillionaire YouTuber- originally- who recently publicly bidded to buy platform TikTok during the 2025 ban of the app in America. Despite his attempts being unsuccessful, it is clear that social media is built from an astounding number of users that the public are influenced by every video they consume. These video sharing applications allow for content to be uploaded and enjoyed by the public, even re·posted on multiple apps. This consistent exposure to the public has allowed some social media niche stars to become public celebrities: starring in films, shows, for example, Addison Rae starring in Netflix movie 'He's All That'.

=== Social media platforms and influence ===
Social media stars also known as "Micro-celebrities" or "Internet Celebrities" are a relatively new form of influencer who has arisen from the various social media content creation platforms: namely YouTube, Vine, TikTok. These individuals spawn from ordinary users who upload their own personal content and gather a following. These followers become fans and eventually a micro-celebrity is born. Although, the origination of the name was given to individuals who share a niche platform and audience, they have grown with the popularity of social media applications and websites. Social Media stars like Lilly Singh, Cody Ko, and Philip DeFranco have all utilized platforms to star in television and web-series: opening up their fanbase. Additionally, some Social Media stars have even gone on to sign media contracts with television networks such as MTV. MTV has personally produced various shows starring social media stars like Tana Mongeau and Jake Paul. Since the late 2010s, YouTube influencers in the UK have increasingly appeared on mainstream television, including Ash Sarkar, who engineered her own "rapid rise to becoming an important ‘alternative’ voice" by appearing on Sky News, Newsnight (BBC) and Good Morning Britain (ITV).

==== Youtubers ====
YouTubers is a name given to those who have reached high numbers of viewers and followers. They become celebrities of said application and continue to manufacture content that their viewers find appealing. These individuals are often idolized by their viewers and fans. Many of these celebrities also use their platform to collaborate with businesses and organizations to advertise their products and services. Additionally, they not only use this platform as a consistent monetary income, YouTube has always been a platform for ideas and a spread of political knowledge. Many of these users display clear bias towards a particular side.

==== TikTokers ====
TikTok became a social media craze in the 2020s, allowing for videos stories and "stitches" to respond to and include other videos in one's posts. Charli D'Amelio, the 18-year old leading TikToker, accumulated over 75 million followers in the span of a year. She was publicly recognized as the most followed user in the application and has used her platform to stand with political and social events in relation to the current Black Lives Matter movement. As a result, the video accumulated over 25 million views and over 8 million "likes" within the application. There have additionally been a variety of other TikTokers utilizing their platform in support of the same movement as well. This, in turn, educates the young viewers and encourages them to be socially and politically aware and active. Many of these users and content creators have acknowledged the murder of George Floyd, and stand in solidarity.

Not only can individuals use their voice on such platform, in recent years, organizations have taken liking to the app with News sources across many Western countries competing to spread information about politics, politicians and global engagements (The Daily Times, The Daily Mail, The Washington Post, Fox News). On this occasion, they are competing for engagement and clicks rather than for people to buy their papers, reaching a much greater number of users digitally than their prints could ever achieve.This form of journalism is particularly known for promoting political agendas associated with right or left-wing thinking, something not so obviously depicted on the platform previously. This shift in content has sparked many debates regarding social media platforms promoting political content that is biased to certain parties, particularly more conservative content.

== Impact on the public ==
=== General influence ===
Through their activism on the world stage, a self-selected cast of celebrities have begun to have a significant impact on policy, shaping the agenda on a range of global humanitarian issues. Celebrities play a growing role as part of an emerging strategy for political advocacy. Spawned by the difficulty most groups have making news, and made possible by the evolution of technology and the public sphere, this new celebrity advocacy strategy of "spotlighting" issues represents one aspect of the broader shift in American politics being ushered in by the digital age. According to Mark Harvey, celebrities are capable of increasing awareness of some policy issues in the media more successfully than public officials and presidents, and are often perceived as more credible than politicians across a wide range of issues. Moreover, they can also persuade target audiences to support many policies. Their ability to speak credibly and persuade others depends on the qualities of the celebrity and the nature of the issue. Celebrities that are perceived to have expertise on an issue, are connected to advocacy organizations, and whose identities are closely associated with the issue are most likely to be seen as credible. Likewise, celebrities are less likely to be persuasive on issues where opinions are already polarized.

Celebrities have the ability to generate parasocial relationships (feelings of a personal connectedness despite the lack of direct contact with the consumers). According to Brian Loader et al., young citizens are generally cautiously positive about both politicians and celebrities using social media but feel that they should learn to use it appropriately if they are to rebuild trust and credibility. In the United States and Canada, there is empirical confirmation of celebrities having a positive effect on the willingness of young people to support specific causes. According to Anubhav and Abhinav Mishra, the credibility of the endorser will likely translate to that of the political group that celebrity is endorsing.

There is little evidence that celebrity endorsements of political candidates have a measurable impact on citizens' likelihood to vote for those candidates. Some evidence suggests that Taylor Swift, for example, has successfully driven voter registration drives. However, a study by Allyson Shortle, Brooklyn Walker, and Mark Harvey demonstrated that Swift's endorsement of hypothetical Democrats would have little impact on already committed Republican and Democratic voters, and would likely cause undecided voters to vote against her endorsement. This is consistent with Harvey's research on celebrity endorsement of political issues, which suggests that celebrities may have little influence where opinion is already fixed and polarized.

=== Politics in branding ===
Political sway could be heavily influenced by public media fans. As more individuals become involved with the opinions of their idols, they could potentially be swayed into a specific political scope. Influence is a pivotal part of politics. Monetary donations are extremely influential in order to utilize the public. When a campaign is in the position of having more monetary resources, they are able to purchase more air-time on television, radio, and web-ads.

In fact, within the year of 2019 over $700 million was donated to political campaigns in support of presidential candidates. Many of these donations originate from people in socially powerful positions: celebrities. A majority of these socially powerful individuals utilize their platform and fanbase to sway public opinion towards a more socially aware option. There are many examples of televised propaganda utilized by celebrity platforms in order to publicly favor a specific political candidate.

=== Identification ===
Identification is the process by which individuals are thought to develop a deep connection with celebrities. This increases the likelihood that the viewer will perform the behaviors advocated by the celebrity as well as adopt similar attitudes and beliefs. Individuals go through the process of identification where they start to believe in the values, convictions and behaviors portrayed by the celebrity endorser and eventually adopt them as their own. Because it is easier to identify with people who have a connection or relationship, individuals are more likely to identify with celebrities that are closer to them in age. Scholars consider identification a significant component in the persuasion process through which celebrities influence audience behavior.

== Criticism ==
Various concerns have been raised over celebrity involvement in politics. According to John Street, one of the main criticisms of celebrity involvement in politics is when celebrities take an office. In his article, as his example of this Street mentions Arnold Schwarzenegger becoming the Governor of California. He cites the main concerns surrounding celebrities holding office is lacking the qualities necessary to be a representative of the people. Street also argues that reliance on intimate mediums, such as television shifts the criteria by which politicians are judged from leadership skills to populist empathy. In Mark Wheeler's book, Celebrity Politics, he mentions that outside of politicians holding public office, their advocacy on political issues can cause skewed understanding of that particular topic. Wheeler suggests these critiques of celebrity involvement in politics reflect the values of the Frankfurt School. The school's critical theorists contended that media has become an expression of dominant ideology, which celebrities advocate for.

Another concern is the effect of celebrity endorsement on voting patterns. In most cases, celebrities influence media engagement as opposed to converting voters.

=== Blockout 2024 ===
In May 2024, the social media accounts of numerous celebrities became a target of the Blockout 2024 social media campaign related to the Gaza–Israel conflict, after the Met Gala brought up concerns about an out-of-touch celebrity culture with the political climate.
