= Haley Kalil =

American model and social media influencer (born 1992)

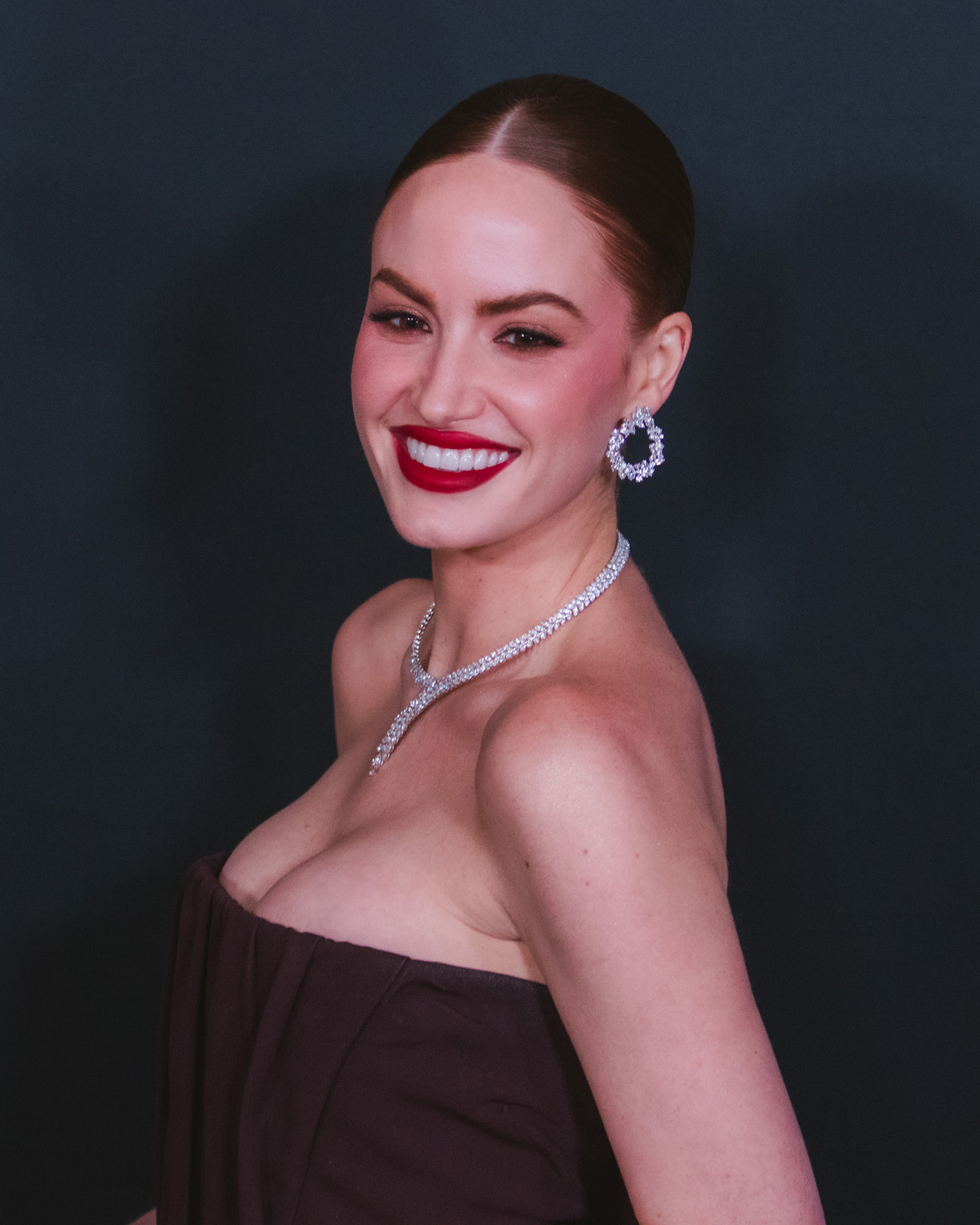
- Kalil in 2026
- Born: Haley O'Brien; August 6, 1992 (age 34); Excelsior, Minnesota, U.S.
- Other name: Haley Baylee
- Education: St. Cloud State University (BS)
- Occupations: Model; influencer
- Height: 5 ft 8 in (1.73 m)
- Spouse: Matt Kalil (m. 2015; div. 2022)
- Beauty pageant titleholder
- Title: Miss Minnesota Teen USA 2010; Miss Collegiate America 2012; Miss Minnesota USA 2014
- Years active: 2008–present
- Hair color: Red blonde
- Eye color: Brown
- Major competitions: Miss Teen USA 2010 (Unplaced); Miss USA 2014 (Top 20)

TikTok information
- Page: haleyybaylee
- Followers: 17.6 M
- Last updated: October 21, 2026

Haley Bea Kalil (née O'Brien; born August 6, 1992), also known as Haley Baylee, is an American actress, model, social media influencer and beauty pageant titleholder. In 2018, Kalil was featured in the Sports Illustrated Swimsuit Issue as a contestant in the first ever Sports Illustrated Swim Search. As one of the two winners of the competition, alongside Camille Kostek, she officially appeared in the 2019 edition as a rookie. Prior to her career as a model, Kalil competed in beauty pageants. As a teenager, she was crowned Miss Minnesota Teen USA 2010 and later competed in Miss Teen USA 2010. Afterwards, Kalil was crowned Miss Minnesota USA 2014, and placed in the top twenty in Miss USA 2014.

In July 2025, Kalil was named to the inaugural TIME100 Creators list, which recognized 100 of the most influential digital creators worldwide. Kalil was named a Forbes top creator in 2024 and 2025.

== Early life ==
Kalil was born Haley O'Brien in Excelsior, Minnesota. She is the middle child of three; Kalil has an older sister and a younger brother. Both of her parents are mechanical engineers. After graduating from Minnetonka High School, she attended St. Cloud State University in St. Cloud, Minnesota. She graduated summa cum laude with a Bachelor of Science in medical biology and psychology and a minor in chemistry.

== Career ==
=== Pageantry ===
Haley began her career in pageantry at the age of 16, competing in Miss Minnesota Teen USA 2009, where she placed as the third runner-up behind eventual winner Vanessa Johnston. She returned to the competition the following year and was crowned Miss Minnesota Teen USA 2010. As Miss Minnesota Teen USA, she earned the right to represent Minnesota at the Miss Teen USA 2010 competition, held at Atlantis Paradise Island in Paradise Island, Bahamas. She did not place, with Kamie Crawford of Maryland eventually winning the competition.

In 2013, while a senior in college, Kalil competed in Miss Minnesota USA 2014 in Burnsville, Minnesota. She went on to be crowned the winner, and earned the right to represent Minnesota at Miss USA 2014 in Baton Rouge, Louisiana. At Miss USA, Kalil placed within the top twenty contestants, before losing out the crown to Nia Sanchez of Nevada. After completing her reign as Miss Minnesota USA, Kalil crowned Jessica Scheu as her successor, and retired from pageantry.

She judged the Miss USA 2021 competition.

=== Modeling ===
In 2017, Kalil took part in the Sports Illustrated Swim Search. She advanced from her original application to one of the top 35, and later top fifteen contestants. As a member of the top fifteen, Kalil modeled in Miami to debut Sports Illustrated Swimsuit Swim and Active apparel lines. She advanced to the top six, and was invited for a shoot in the 2018 issue as a model search contestant.

In March 2018, it was announced that Kalil had been selected as one of the two winners of the competition, alongside Camille Kostek. She appeared as a rookie model in the 2019 edition, and appeared in the 2020 and 2021 Sports Illustrated Swimsuit Issue editions.

In 2018, Kalil was signed to Wilhelmina Models New York, but stated in March 2023 that she would no longer work with modeling agencies citing negative experiences.

=== Met Gala and Blockout 2024 ===
In May 2024, Kalil (who goes by @haleyybaylee on social media) gained attention for a TikTok video posted on the day of the 2024 Met Gala in which she lip-synced to an audio of the movie Marie Antoinette (2006) dressed in a "floral headdress with doll-like makeup" at the Met Gala saying "let them eat cake". The video was cited for being "tone-deaf" and "dystopian" in contrast to the recent protests and arrests on university campuses related to the Gaza-Israel conflict. She later apologized in a nine-minute-long video stating her intention was never to offend anyone. However, her video served as a catalyst for Blockout 2024, a campaign to block celebrities' social media accounts based on their views regarding the conflict.

=== Television hosting ===
In August 2026, Kalil hosted the reunion episode of the Netflix original reality series Let's Marry Harry. Later that year, she was announced to be hosting a new Netflix show, Win the Mall set to release on November 18, 2026.

== Personal life ==
On July 8, 2015, Kalil married American football player Matt Kalil in a ceremony in Kauai, Hawaii. The following year, on July 8, they renewed their vows in a formal ceremony with family and friends, celebrating a year of marriage. She filed for divorce on May 4, 2022. As of 2026, she is in a relationship with accountant Steven Mast.

In 2022, Haley was diagnosed with endometriosis, urethritis and ovarian cysts, and underwent surgery to remove the tissue from endometriosis and the scar tissue from urethritis. Kalil has said she was previously a victim of domestic violence. In January 2026, her ex-husband Matt Kalil filed a lawsuit against Haley for allegedly making explicit remarks about his anatomy during a stream where she discussed their genital incompatibility in their previous marriage.

== Filmography ==
Year	Title	Role	Notes
2023	The Weapon	Trafficked Woman	
2024	Christmas in the Spotlight	Nicole Gonville	
2025	Carters Mafia	Haley	TV Series
2026	Let's Marry Harry: The Reunion	Herself	TV episode
2026	Win the Mall	Herself	TV Series

Awards and achievements
Preceded by Vanessa Johnston	Miss Minnesota Teen USA; 2010	Succeeded by Hannah Corbett
Preceded by Shannon Folsom	Miss Collegiate America; 2012	Succeeded by Savvy Shields
Preceded by Danielle Hooper	Miss Minnesota USA; 2014	Succeeded by Jessica Scheu
