= Miss Minnesota Teen USA =

Beauty pageant competition

- Formation: 1983
- Type: Beauty pageant
- Headquarters: Savage
- Location: Minnesota
- Members: Miss Teen USA
- Official language: English
- Website: Official website

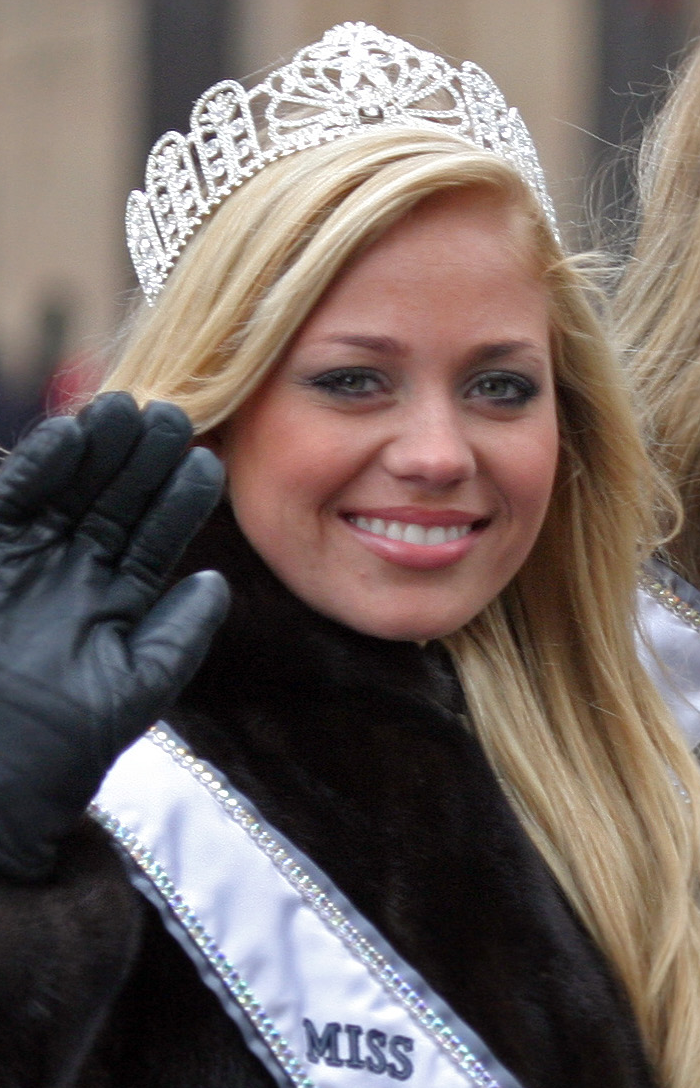
Sarah Sprayberry, Miss Minnesota Teen USA 2008

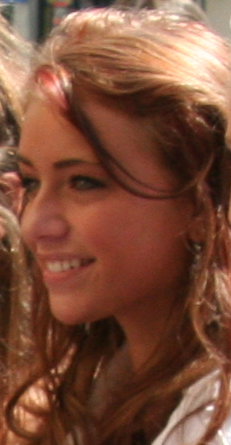
Vanessa Vonbehren, Miss Minnesota Teen USA 2007

The Miss Minnesota Teen USA competition is the pageant that selects the representative for the state of Minnesota in the Miss Teen USA pageant. This pageant is directed by Future Productions based in Savage, Minnesota.

Minnesota has not been very successful at Miss Teen USA, with their first placement coming in 1995, in the pageant's thirteenth year. Minnesota teens have performed best in the 2000s, with two top fifteen, three top ten placements and a 4th runner-up placement.

Five Minnesota teens have won the Miss Minnesota USA and one the Miss Wisconsin USA pageant and competed at Miss USA.

The current titleholder is Mya Gierman of Rogers, was crowned on May 30, 2026, at The Franklin Center in Des Moines. She will represent Minnesota at Miss Teen USA 2026.

== Results summary ==
=== Placements ===
- 1st runner-up: Maisie Adams (2025)
- 4th runners-up: Maggie McGill (2013)
- Top 10: Alla Ilushka (2002), Allison Arling (2004), Vanessa Vonbehren (2007)
- Top 12: Michelle Borg (1995)
- Top 15: Lauren Hindi (2005), Hannah Corbett (2011)

Minnesota holds a record of 8 placements at Miss Teen USA.

=== Awards ===
- Miss Congeniality: Olivia Herbert (2019)

== Winners ==
- Declared as Winner
- Ended as runner-up
- Ended as one of the finalists or semifinalists

Year	Name	Hometown	Age^{1}	Local title	Placement at Miss Teen USA	Special awards at Miss Teen USA	Notes
2026	Mya Gierman	Rogers	19				
2025	Maisie Adams	North Oaks	17	Miss North Oaks Teen	1st runner-up		Daughter of Miss North Dakota USA 1994 Amy Lantz
2024	Grace Stahl	Minnetonka	17	Miss Minnetonka Teen			
2023	Mikhala Rivers	Maple Grove	17	Miss Saint Paul Teen			
2022	Ava Ernst	Saint Paul	18	Miss Saint Paul Teen			Previously Miss Minnesota High School America 2021
2021	Annika Wiese	Owatonna	18	Miss Owatonna Teen			
2020	Gwendolyn Buchanan	Duluth	18				
2019	Olivia Herbert	Andover	16			Miss Congeniality	Cousin of Miss Minnesota USA 2011 Brittany Thelemann
2018	Peyton Schroeder	Rosemount	18				
2017	Tori Trittin	Lakeville	15				Later Miss Wisconsin USA 2024
2016	Sophia Primozich	Minnetonka	16				
2015	Hayden Grace Hammond	Maple Grove	18				
2014	Catherine Stanley	Bloomington	18				Later Miss Minnesota USA 2019
2013	Maggie McGill	Plymouth	18		4th runner-up		
2012	Kendra Berger	Apple Valley	16				
2011	Hannah Corbett	Excelsior	17		Top 15		
2010	Haley O'Brien	Victoria	18				Later Miss Minnesota USA 2014; Later Miss Collegiate America 2012
2009	Vanessa Johnston	Lakeville	17				America's Next Top Model Cycle 15 semi-finalist, Eliminated first round of cuts
2008	Sarah Sprayberry	St. Paul	16				
2007	Vanessa Vonbehren	Apple Valley	17		Top 10		
2006	Amy Blue	Anoka	17				
2005	Lauren Hindi	Stacy	16		Top 15		
2004	Allison Arling	Lakeville	18		Top 10		
2003	Kristin Swoboda	White Bear Lake	16				
2002	Alla Ilushka	Eden Prairie	17		Top 10		Later Miss Minnesota USA 2007
2001	Serene Aandahl	Minneapolis					Top 10 at Miss Universe Canada 2007, 4th runner up at Miss Minnesota USA 2008
2000	Jennifer Jones	Lakeville					
1999	Laura Beth Reier	Brooklyn Park					
1998	Kristin Hilgenberg	Lakeville	19				Daughter of former professional American football player Wally Hilgenberg
1997	Jamie Duffney	Plymouth	17				
1996	Sarah Cahill	Waseca	17				Later Miss Minnesota USA 2003
1995	Michelle Borg	Brainerd	17		Semi-finalist		
1994	Paige Swenson	Fridley					Later Miss Minnesota USA 2000
1993	Charity Lundy	Stacy	16				
1992	Elizabeth Peters	Lake Hubert	16				
1991	Natasha Grudnoske	Arden Hills					
1990	Jennifer Bell	Blooming Prairie	16				
1989	Darcy Inglested	Prior Lake					
1988	Julie Ward	Savage					
1987	Karin Hargroves	Shoreview					
1986	Jennifer Geckal	Bloomington					
1985	Lana Burke	Crystal					
1984	Heather Johnson	Truman					
1983	Kimberly Anne Ess	Shakopee	17				

^{1} Age at the time of the Miss Teen USA pageant
