= Let's Marry Harry =

Netflix reality television series

- Genre: Dating game show; Reality television
- Presented by: Amanda Kloots
- Starring: Harry Jowsey
- Country of origin: United States
- Original language: English
- No. of seasons: 1
- No. of episodes: 8

Production
- Executive producers: Alexandra Cooper; Matt Kaplan; Mina Lefevre
- Production company: Unwell

Original release
- Network: Netflix
- Release: August 5 – August 12, 2026

Related
- Perfect Match

Let's Marry Harry is a Netflix original dating game show series starring Australian influencer and television personality Harry Jowsey. It aired on August 5, 2026.

== Premise ==
Australian reality television personality and social media influencer Harry Jowsey must choose his future wife from among twenty women competing for marriage. Jowsey is advised by three confidants: his ex-girlfriend Georgia Hassarati, his longtime friend Sonny Henty, and television presenter Amanda Kloots.

== Production ==
The show was produced by Alexandra Cooper's production company Unwell. Filming took place in California, Nevada, and New Zealand.

== Contestants ==
The twenty contestants were announced on August 5, 2026. Jowsey married Amber Mozo in the finale episode. At the reunion, it was revealed that they had since broken up.

Name	Age	Hometown	Occupation	Exited	Status
Amber Mozo	30	O’ahu, Hawaii	Photographer	Episode 8	Winner
Dannelle Davidson	33 (Note: Dannelle was 32 during Episode 1, before turning 33 in Episode 2.)	Las Vegas, Nevada	Cocktail waitress	Episode 8	Runner-up
Sam Kruse	24	Chico, California	Indoor soccer arena owner	Episode 7	Quit (Note: Sam quit in Episode 7 due to Harry being dishonest towards her.)
Emma Piotrowski	26	Chicago, Illinois	Marketing manager	Episode 6	Eliminated
Abigail "Abby" Easterling	24	Lafayette, Louisiana	Medical esthetician	Episode 6	Eliminated
Mya Benway	23	Scottsdale, Arizona	Clothing brand owner	Episode 5	Eliminated
Juliana Melchor	30	Houston, Texas	Account Manager	Episode 5	Eliminated
Rickiyah "Kiki" McGrady	26	Humboldt, California	Healthcare recruiter	Episode 4	Quit (Note: Rickiyah quit in Episode 4 due to seeing no romantic future with Harry.)
Elli Schryver	32	Scottsdale, Arizona	Retired	Episode 4	Eliminated
Debralee Tomberlin	26	Kings Mountain, North Carolina	Medical device sales	Episode 4	Eliminated
Shaine Hinson	24	Anchorage, Alaska	Medical sales	Episode 3	Eliminated
Samantha "Sammy" Gotay	29	Upper Saddle River, New Jersey	Pilates instructor	Episode 3	Eliminated
Jade Ines	25	Thousand Oaks, California	Software sales	Episode 3	Eliminated
Emily Stone	27	Milwaukee, Wisconsin	Aesthetic nurse injector	Episode 3	Eliminated
Chelsea "Charlie" Hare	29	Dallas, Texas	Digital entrepreneur	Episode 3	Eliminated
Samantha Madsen	23	Austin, Texas	Recruiter	Episode 2	Eliminated
Maya Avery	25	Armonk, New York	CEO	Episode 2	Eliminated
Lindsey Clark	27	San Francisco, California	Yacht stewardess	Episode 2	Eliminated
Lauren Hollinger	30	Dover, Delaware	Nurse	Episode 2	Eliminated
Faith Gonzalez	24	Elkton, Kentucky	Marketing	Episode 2	Eliminated

== Duration ==
Contestants eliminated in Let’s Marry Harry
Name	E02	E03	E04	E05	E06	E07	E08
Amber							Winner
Dannelle							x
Sam						x	
Emma					x		
Abigail					x		
Mya B.				x			
Juliana				x			
Rickiyah			x				
Elli			x				
Debralee			x				
Shaine		x					
Sammy		x					
Jade		x					
Emily		x					
Charlie		x					
Samantha	x						
Maya A.	x						
Lindsay	x						
Lauren	x						
Faith	x						

== Episodes ==
The first seven episodes were released on August 5, 2026 and the eighth episode and season finale was released on August 12, 2026.

No. overall	No. in season	Title	Original release date
01	1	"I Wanna Marry Harry"	August 5, 2026
Ready to kick off his reformed era, Harry and his closest friends welcome 20 hopeful singles looking to catch feelings and create a love connection.
02	2	"Kiss & Tell"	August 5, 2026
After dissecting their first dates, the group faces a shock elimination of five fiancées before the surviving couples undergo an intense compatibility test.
03	3	"Why Do I Keep Kissing Everyone"	August 5, 2026
After Harry's secretive upstairs rendezvous with Dannelle shifts the mood, a playful finger painting date takes a competitive turn as hidden tensions and territorial feelings boil over.
04	4	"Breakups Are Never Easy"	August 5, 2026
Communication skills are put to the test in a wedding-themed challenge that leads to a clarifying conversation on the beach and a surprising exit.
05	5	"The "L-Word""	August 5, 2026
An opportunity to share feelings reveals deep vulnerabilities; Harry second-guesses himself after saying something he instantly regrets.
06	6	"I Want To Know If I Can Trust You With My Daughter"	August 5, 2026
It's crunch time for connection; Harry and the fiancées jet to Vegas, where he meets the families of the final three and unveils his wedding plans.
07	7	"I‘m In Love With Two Women"	August 5, 2026
Alex Cooper lends her ear amid another unexpected exit; feelings hit hard when Harry heads home to his family in New Zealand.
08	8	"Wedding Day"	August 12, 2026
Will he or won't he? Back in Los Angeles for wedding week, Harry has his final dates with the fiancées. It's time to choose a bride — unless he calls it quits.

== Let's Marry Harry: The Reunion ==
A reunion episode, Let's Marry Harry: The Reunion, hosted by Haley Kalil, was released on Aug 26, 2026. In the hour-and-a-half-long episode, it was revealed that Jowsey and Mozo split in January 2026.
