= Alex Cooper (podcaster) =

American podcaster (born 1994)

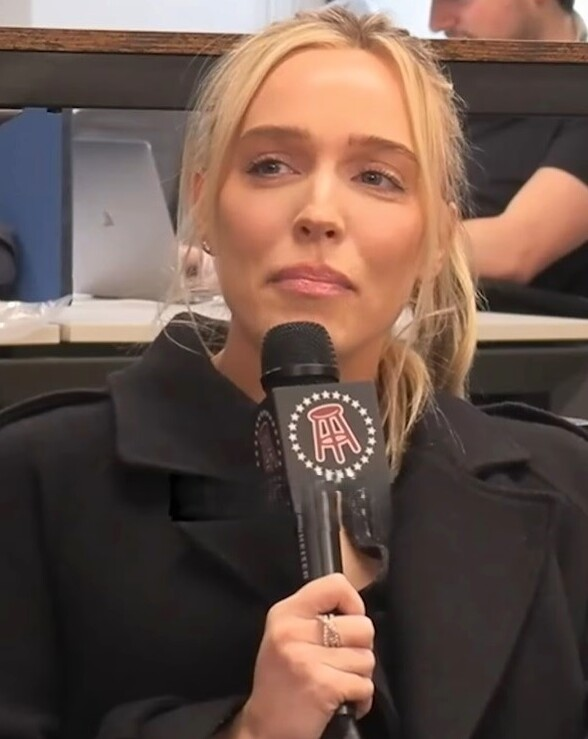
- Cooper in 2023
- Born: Alexandra Cooper; August 21, 1994 (age 32); Newtown, Pennsylvania, U.S.
- Education: Boston University
- Occupation: Podcaster
- Years active: 2018–present
- Spouse: Matt Kaplan (m. 2024)
- Children: 1
Association football career
- Position: Midfielder
College career
Years	Team	Apps	(Gls)
2013–2015	Boston University Terriers	49	(1)

Alexandra Cooper (born August 21, 1994) is an American podcaster who co-created and hosts Call Her Daddy, a weekly comedy and advice podcast with her co-host Sofia Franklyn. In 2020, she signed a three-year exclusive deal with Spotify worth $60 million. Making $20 million per year made her Spotify's highest-earning female podcaster and the second-highest-paid podcaster, behind only Joe Rogan. The show was also the second-most-popular podcast globally on Spotify for 2024, behind Rogan.

Rolling Stone labeled her "the new generation's Barbara Walters" for frequently enlisting high-profile Hollywood talent and influential individuals in American popular culture to be guests on her podcast. In 2023, Cooper was named to the TIME100 Next list. In 2025, Cooper was named to Time magazine's inaugural "TIME100 Creators" list—appearing in the "Titans" category—for her impact as the creator and host of the Call Her Daddy podcast.

== Early life and education ==
Cooper was raised in Newtown, Pennsylvania, and is the youngest of three siblings. Her father is a TV sports producer and her mother is a psychologist.

She attended St. Andrew's Catholic School and The Pennington School in Mercer County, New Jersey. She enrolled at Boston University in 2013, where she studied film and television and played on the school's Division I soccer team.

== Career ==
=== Barstool Sports (2017–2021) ===
After college, Cooper moved to New York City and worked in advertising sales. In 2018, Cooper and her roommate, Sofia Franklyn, created the Call Her Daddy podcast. One month after its first episode, it was acquired by Barstool Sports. The podcast rapidly increased in popularity, with downloads rising from 12,000 to 2 million in two months. Cooper ousted Franklyn behind her back to finish out the contract at Barstool Sports.

=== Spotify (2021–2024) ===
In 2021, Cooper signed a three-year exclusive deal with Spotify worth $60 million. Following her public split with Franklyn, Cooper transitioned the show to an interview format where the second voice was always provided by her guests. The podcast amassed over 4.4 million followers on Spotify.

Since signing with the music streaming service, Cooper has "steadily grown in stature," according to Vanity Fair, which reported that her show became "an increasingly common forum for celebrity interviews and the leading archetype in a large ecosystem of podcasts centered on relationships and advice."

In 2023, Spotify's CEO, Daniel Ek, noted Cooper's podcast helped drive engagement of younger women with the service, contributing to a surge in year-over-year monthly active users and revenue by 27% and 11%, respectively. Spotify data showed that guest appearances on Cooper's podcast led to dramatic spikes in musicians' streaming numbers. Anitta's streams rose 155%, Madison Beer's climbed 130%, John Legend's 200%, and John Mayer's 350%.

In September 2023, Cooper started The Unwell Network, a podcast network to partner with Spotify's enterprise platform, Megaphone, for the hosting and distribution of popular podcasts. The ‘Unwell’ phrase was coined by former co-host Franklyn. She signed Alix Earle and Madeline Argy for Hot Mess with Alix Earle and Pretty Lonesome with Madeline Argy. In February 2025, it was reported that Alix Earle departed from the network.

Cooper was a commentator and host during NBC coverage of the 2024 Summer Olympics.

=== SiriusXM and Unwell expansion (2024–present) ===
In August 2024, Cooper signed a $125 million, three-year deal with SiriusXM which replaced Spotify as her distribution and advertising partner beginning in 2025.

In November 2024, Cooper announced the launch of Unwell Hydration, a beverage line produced in partnership with Nestlé and aimed at women's wellness. Introduced as an electrolyte-infused drink, it debuted exclusively at Target stores and online in the United States on January 1, 2025. Cooper stated that the drink was developed in response to a market she perceived as predominantly targeting men.

In June 2025, Cooper was the seventh highest-earning creator on the Forbes Top-Earning Creators list, with estimated earnings of $32 million in 2024, making her the highest-earning female creator on the list.

In July 2025, Cooper performed "Take Me Out to the Ball Game" at a Chicago Cubs vs. St. Louis Cardinals game at Wrigley Field, a performance that was received unfavorably by the crowd and seen as disrespectful to fans.

In October 2025, Cooper launched Unwell Creative Agency, an advertising and creative agency operating under her media company, Unwell. The agency positioned itself as a conduit for brands seeking to reach Gen Z audiences through podcasts, live events, and original productions. The agency secured its first reported client through a multiyear creative and media agreement with Google, involving the production of social media advertising and live event activations tied to Google’s Pixel and Android products. Unwell produced the reality series Let's Marry Harry, starring Harry Jowsey, for Netflix.

=== Call Her Alex documentary ===
In 2025, Cooper was the subject of Call Her Alex, a two-part documentary series that premiered at the Tribeca Festival before streaming on Hulu and Disney+. Directed by Ry Russo-Young, the docuseries traced Cooper's life and career from her childhood in Pennsylvania through the launch and massive success of the Call Her Daddy podcast. It featured behind-the-scenes footage of her first live tour and provided insight into the end of her professional partnership with Sofia Franklyn. The documentary also included an account of her collegiate athletic career, during which Cooper alleged she was subjected to years of sexual harassment by her former Boston University soccer coach.

=== Acting debut ===
Cooper made her acting debut in the film adaptation of Verity (2026), in which she appeared as herself, hosting her podcast Call Her Daddy and interviewing the character Verity Crawford, played by Anne Hathaway.

== Personal life ==
In 2023, Cooper became engaged to film producer Matt Kaplan. They married on April 6, 2024, in the Riviera Maya, Mexico. In May 2026, Cooper announced that she and Kaplan were expecting their first child. Cooper gave birth to a baby boy in October.

== Filmography ==
=== Film ===
Year	Title	Role	Notes
2025	Call Her Alex	Herself	Documentary
2026	Verity	Herself	

=== Television ===
Year	Title	Role	Notes
2026	Let's Marry Harry	Herself	2 episodes
