= Rachel Latuff =

American educator and beauty pageant titleholder (born 1991)

- Education: University of Minnesota Duluth
- Beauty pageant titleholder
- Title: Miss Midwest 2012; Miss Saint Paul 2014; Miss Olmsted County 2015; Miss Minnesota 2015; Miss Minnesota USA 2026 (as Rachel Betterley)
- Major competitions: Miss America 2016 (Unplaced); Miss USA 2026 (Top 20)
- Website: rachellatuff.weebly.com

Rachel Latuff is an American beauty pageant titleholder, who won Miss Minnesota 2015. She competed at Miss America 2016 in September 2015, and did not reach the top 15. she will also represent Minnesota at Miss USA 2026.

== Pageant career ==
=== Early pageants ===
Latuff's first pageant was Miss Bayfront in Duluth, Minnesota. On July 21, 2012 Latuff won Miss Midwest 2012. She competed at Miss Minnesota 2013, with the platform "Teach For America: Creating a Better Tomorrow for Youth Education". She was not a finalist for the state title.

On January 4, 2014, Latuff won Miss Saint Paul 2014. She competed at Miss Minnesota 2014 with the platform "Engage, Educate, Empower: Building Cultural Competency Through the Arts". She was fourth runner-up to winner Savannah Cole and won the pageant's Lifestyle and Fitness award.

Latuff was chosen to represent Minnesota at the National Sweetheart 2014 in Hoopeston, Illinois. She tied for the John Bitner Judge's Award but was not a finalist.

=== Miss Minnesota 2015 ===
On January 17, 2015, Latuff won Miss Olmsted County 2015 and qualified for Miss Minnesota 2015 as one of 27 local qualifiers. The pageant was held at Eden Prairie High School in June 2015. Her platform was "Teaching the Heart: Building the Social and Emotional Wellness of Youth and their Teachers".

Latuff won on Saturday, June 13, 2015, and was crowned by Miss Minnesota 2014 Savannah Cole. She earned more than $9,000 in scholarship money and other prizes from the state pageant.

In honor of her win, Wyatt's Twisted Americana restaurant in Hastings, Minnesota, added a special cheeseburger to their menu. Called "Miss Minnesota's Own – Rachel's Four Point Burger", it was served with lettuce, pickles, onions, and tomatoes and a side of french fries plus an onion ring topped by "sweet sparkles" as an imitation of her crown. Proceeds from the sale of the cheeseburger were donated to Latuff's platform cause and it was only available during the city's Rivertown Days festival in mid-July 2015.

=== Miss America 2016 ===
Latuff represented Minnesota at Miss America 2016 in Atlantic City, New Jersey, in September 2015. In the televised finale on September 13, 2015, she did not reach the top 15 and was eliminated from competition. She was awarded a $3,000 scholarship prize as her state's representative.

== Early life and education ==
Latuff is a native of Hastings, Minnesota, and a 2009 graduate of Hastings High School. Her father is Scott Latuff and her mother is Wendy Latuff.

Latuff is a May 2013 graduate of the University of Minnesota Duluth where she earned a Bachelor of Fine Arts degree in art education. Since June 2014, Latuff has worked as a high school visual arts teacher at North Woods School in St. Louis County, Minnesota.

Awards and achievements
Preceded by Savannah Cole	Miss Minnesota; 2015	Succeeded by Madeline Van Ert
Preceded by Megan Rivera	Miss Minnesota USA; 2026 (as Rachel Betterley)	Incumbent
