= Sofia Franklyn =

American podcast host and influencer (born 1992)

- Born: July 20, 1992 (age 34); Utah, U.S.
- Occupation: Podcaster
- Years active: 2018–present
- Website: https://sofiafranklyn.com/

Sofia Franklyn (born July 20, 1992) is an American podcaster who created and hosts Sofia with an F. She also co-created the advice and comedy podcast Call Her Daddy with Alex Cooper before the two parted ways in May 2020.

== Early life and education ==
Franklyn was born and raised in Utah. She was raised by her single mother, an immigrant from Argentina. She attended a private Catholic school. She did not meet her father, a Spaniard, until she was in high school.

== Career ==
=== Call Her Daddy (2018–2020) ===
After graduating from college, Franklyn began working at Morgan Stanley, which she pursued because it provided a stable income. Franklyn once reflected on her time at Morgan Stanley, saying "Every single day I would sit in my cubicle and dream of podcasts, because I would listen to them all day." In 2018, Franklyn and her roommate, Alex Cooper, created the Call Her Daddy podcast. Barstool Sports acquired the podcast one month after their first episode was released. The podcast rapidly increased in popularity, with downloads rising from 12,000 to 2 million in two months.

In 2020, Franklyn and Cooper began negotiating a new contract with Dave Portnoy, the founder of Barstool. At the time, Franklyn was involved in a relationship with Peter Nelson, who was working as an executive for HBO Sports. Portnoy accused Nelson of advising Franklyn to refuse Barstool's contract offer. Franklyn caught Cooper negotiating in secret with Portnoy, without her consent or rightful recognition of IP rights. Cooper settled on new terms without Franklyn's consent or knowing, leading to her exit from the show. This split was further compounded by a social media-hate campaign against Franklyn and her ex-boyfriend, fueled by Barstool Sports. In the years following, Cooper has maintained a neutral stance, never elaborating on the exact technicalities of the deal. Following the split, Franklyn moved back to Salt Lake City. The fallout significantly impacted her mental health and wellbeing, with Franklyn citing heavy substance abuse to cope with the betrayal.

=== Sofia with an F (2020–present) ===
In October 2020, Franklyn launched a new podcast, Sofia with an F.

=== Daddy Issues memoir ===
On February 25, 2026, Simon & Schuster announced Franklyn's memoir, Daddy Issues, set to be released on November 10, 2026. The next day, Franklyn released a 31-minute YouTube video, detailing the story behind her memoir. Her memoir encompasses her life story, from the beginning to current events. Beyond the Cooper fallout, Franklyn establishes her own truth, bringing light to aspects of her public life. Franklyn voiced the audiobook for the memoir, hitting No. 1 on Amazon Audiobooks instantly. The book was then released on November 10, becoming an instant national bestseller. Cooper and Kaplan threatened to sue for defamation prior to the release of the book.

== Personal life ==
In 2024, Franklyn met her boyfriend through a matchmaker. On September 1, 2025, Franklyn announced that she was engaged.

== Bibliography ==
- Franklyn, Sofia (2026). Daddy Issues: A Memoir. Simon & Schuster. ISBN 9781668239568.
