= Call Her Daddy =

Sex advice and comedy podcast

- 2021 cover art
- Genre: Human sexuality; sexual relationships; interview; culture of New York City
- Country of origin: United States
- Language: English

Creative team
- Created by: Alex Cooper; Sofia Franklyn

Cast and voices
- Hosted by: Alex Cooper (2018–present); Sofia Franklyn (2018–2020)

Production
- Production: Unwell
- Length: 30–60 minutes

Publication
- No. of episodes: 564 (as of April 18, 2026)
- Original release: October 3, 2018
- Provider: Spotify; YouTube; SiriusXM
- Updates: New episodes on Wednesdays and Sundays

Related
- Website: callherdaddy.com

Call Her Daddy is an advice and comedy podcast created by Alex Cooper and Sofia Franklyn in 2018. The podcast was owned and distributed by Barstool Sports until June 2021, when it was announced that Cooper had signed an exclusive deal with Spotify worth $60 million. In the late spring of 2020, Cooper and Franklyn were engaged in a publicized dispute with Barstool founder Dave Portnoy, which resulted in Franklyn leaving the show. Cooper reached an agreement with Barstool and continued hosting the podcast on her own. In August 2024, Cooper signed a deal with SiriusXM worth $125 million to replace Spotify as her distribution and advertising partner. According to Fortune, the podcast was the most-listened to among women in 2023.

== History ==
The podcast was launched in 2018 by Sofia Franklyn and Alex Cooper, who were roommates at the time. According to an article in MediaFeed, "The name 'Call Her Daddy' was chosen to reflect female empowerment. To be more specific, Cooper and her former cohost, Sofia Franklyn, talked about a woman who did something new in the bedroom and took the lead while having sex. That's when Alex suggested 'Call Him Daddy' for the podcast's name, to which Sofia replied, 'No, Call Her Daddy.'"

The podcast rapidly increased in popularity, with downloads rising from 12,000 to 2 million in two months. According to Barstool Sports founder Dave Portnoy, the company signed a three-year contract with the co-hosts in 2018. This contract provided a base salary of $75,000, supplemented with bonuses for podcast performance and a portion of merchandise sales. The contract ceded all intellectual property to Barstool Sports.

=== Break with Barstool ===
Following an episode titled "Kesha... The End" released on April 8, 2020, new episodes stopped being released. Explanations for the break were not communicated to fans, with the co-hosts releasing a statement on Instagram noting that they "legally can't speak out yet." Amidst the lack of communication, significant gossip developed among tabloids and fan forums. On May 17, an episode was released to the podcast feed featuring Portnoy discussing the hiatus from the perspective of Barstool. The 30-minute episode described financial and contractual details. Portnoy claimed that Barstool had offered a base salary of $500,000 to the co-hosts and noted that Barstool was losing $100,000 per missed episode of the podcast. He said Cooper had settled on new terms, but Franklyn remained unwilling to agree to a new contract, ultimately leading to her exit from the show.

At the time, Franklyn was involved in a relationship with Peter Nelson (dubbed "Suit Man" in previous episodes of Call Her Daddy), who was working as an executive for HBO Sports. Portnoy accused Nelson of advising Franklyn to refuse Barstool's contract offer. Nelson also allegedly shopped the program around to other podcast distributors, further fraying the relationship between Franklyn and Barstool.

=== Solo hosting by Cooper ===
Alex Cooper began releasing the podcast alone following the break, stating in late May 2020 that she would be pushing forward without Franklyn. She told listeners that a new co-host would be chosen soon. Miley Cyrus joined Cooper on the re-launched podcast in August 2020, discussing her breakup from Liam Hemsworth. Franklyn eventually began her own individual podcast titled Sofia with an F. After continuing as a solo host, the podcast transitioned from its original explicit sex-and-dating format toward a celebrity interview show. Among the high-profile guests Cooper has hosted is former First Lady Michelle Obama who appeared in January 2026 to discuss gender inequality and her book The Look.

=== Distribution by Spotify and Sirius XM ===
In June 2021, Cooper signed a deal worth $60 million to exclusively present the podcast on Spotify. Barstool continued to handle the show's merchandising. In August 2024, Cooper signed a $125 million deal with Sirius XM to replace Spotify as her distribution and advertising partner. The podcast is available on all podcast platforms.

=== Unwell Network ===
In August 2023, Cooper launched the Unwell Network, a podcast network aimed at Gen Z audiences. The network's initial signings included creators Alix Earle and Madeline Argy, who launched their own shows, "Hot Mess with Alix Earle" and "Pretty Lonesome with Madeline Argy", through the platform. In February 2025, Earle's podcast departed from the network. The Unwell Network operates as a subsidiary of Trending, a media company Cooper founded with her husband, film producer Matt Kaplan.

=== Alex Cooper On Tour ===
Alex Cooper went on tour in 2023 and 2024 starting with a sold out show in Boston on November 3, 2023. This series of shows was called the Unwell Tour and featured celebrity guests like Alix Earle, Chelsea Handler, and Kelsea Ballerini. She promoted the shows on Call Her Daddy and used the title "Unwell" from an episode she had filmed with her former cohost, Sofia Franklyn.

== Content ==
While owned by Barstool Sports, the podcast focused on discussing sexuality and dating, and was known for being explicit. After moving to Spotify, the show focused more on mental health, having clinical psychologists and psychotherapists as guests, though the show continues to have raunchy elements. Cooper has said that the show is edited to make every moment saturated with content to avoid losing the audience's attention.

In October 2024, Cooper conducted an interview with Vice President Kamala Harris ahead of the 2024 presidential election. For the interview, Cooper traveled to a Washington, D.C. location where the Harris campaign had constructed a replica of her studio set. Following the election, the Washington Examiner reported, citing an anonymous source, that the campaign had spent approximately $100,000 on the set. Speaking at the New York Times DealBook Summit in December 2024, Cooper expressed skepticism about the reported figure, stating that her own Los Angeles studio does not cost six figures.

According to the August 2024 SiriusXM Press Release, extensive exclusive content will debut on SiriusXM in 2025.

== Audience ==
Cooper calls the show's audience the "Daddy Gang". In 2020, Call Her Daddy was the fifth-most-popular podcast on Spotify. From 2021 until 2024, Call Her Daddy was ranked as the second-most-popular podcast on Spotify, finishing behind The Joe Rogan Experience over four years. As of 2024, Call Her Daddy has 3.7 million followers on Spotify, making it the third-most-followed podcast on the platform. Call Her Daddy gained over 5 million weekly listeners and has an average audience of around 10 million per episode. In January 2025, Call Her Daddy received Spotify's Silver Creator Milestone Award after reaching 250 million streams on the platform.

== Call Her Alex ==
In June 2025, a two-part documentary series titled Call Her Alex premiered at the Tribeca Film Festival on June 8 and began streaming on Hulu on June 10. Directed by Ry Russo-Young, the series traces Cooper's path from her early life in Pennsylvania through her career in podcasting. During the documentary, Cooper publicly alleged that she had experienced sexual harassment by her former soccer coach, Nancy Feldman, during Cooper's time as a student at Boston University from 2013 to 2015. Cooper alleged the harassment occurred over three years and that university officials declined to take action when she reported it. Feldman, who retired from Boston University in 2022, did not respond to requests for comment from multiple news outlets. Boston University issued a statement affirming its zero-tolerance policy for sexual harassment.

== Accolades ==
Accolades received by Call Her Daddy
Award	Year (Note: Indicates the year of ceremony)	Category	Recipient(s)	Result	Ref.
Golden Globe Awards	2026	Best Podcast	Call Her Daddy	Nominated	
