= Sarah Cahill (model) =

American beauty pageant contestant (born 1978)

- Born: Sarah Mae Cahill; 1978; Waseca, Minnesota
- Height: 5 ft 8 in (1.73 m)
- Beauty pageant titleholder
- Title: Miss Minnesota Teen USA 1996; Miss Minnesota USA 2003
- Hair color: Blonde
- Eye color: Hazel
- Major competitions: Miss Teen USA 1996; Miss USA 2003

Sarah Mae Cahill (born 1978) is an American beauty pageant titleholder. Originally from Waseca, Minnesota, she won her first state crown in 1995, when she became Miss Minnesota Teen USA.

Eight years later Cahill won the Miss Minnesota USA 2003 crown and competed for the Miss USA pageant. She also appeared in the Miss USA edition of NBC's Fear Factor. Cahill was unplaced for the second time.

At the time of winning her pageant crown, Cahill was working as a flight attendant for Northwest Airlines. She has also worked as a professional model and has made appearances on Beverly Hills, 90210 and The Rosie O'Donnell Show. In 2007, she appeared on an episode of I Love New York. She also appeared as the blonde flight attendant who grabs the dance pole on the jet in Iron Man after offering the hot sake.

She also had an appearance in the popular show How I Met Your Mother.

== Filmography ==
Year	Title	Role	Notes
2006	Miracle Dogs Too	Receptionist	video
2006	Shark	Allison Adams	
2006	How I Met Your Mother	Rosa	
2008	Iron Man	Flight attendant #3	
