= Christopher Gohl =

German politician (born 1974)

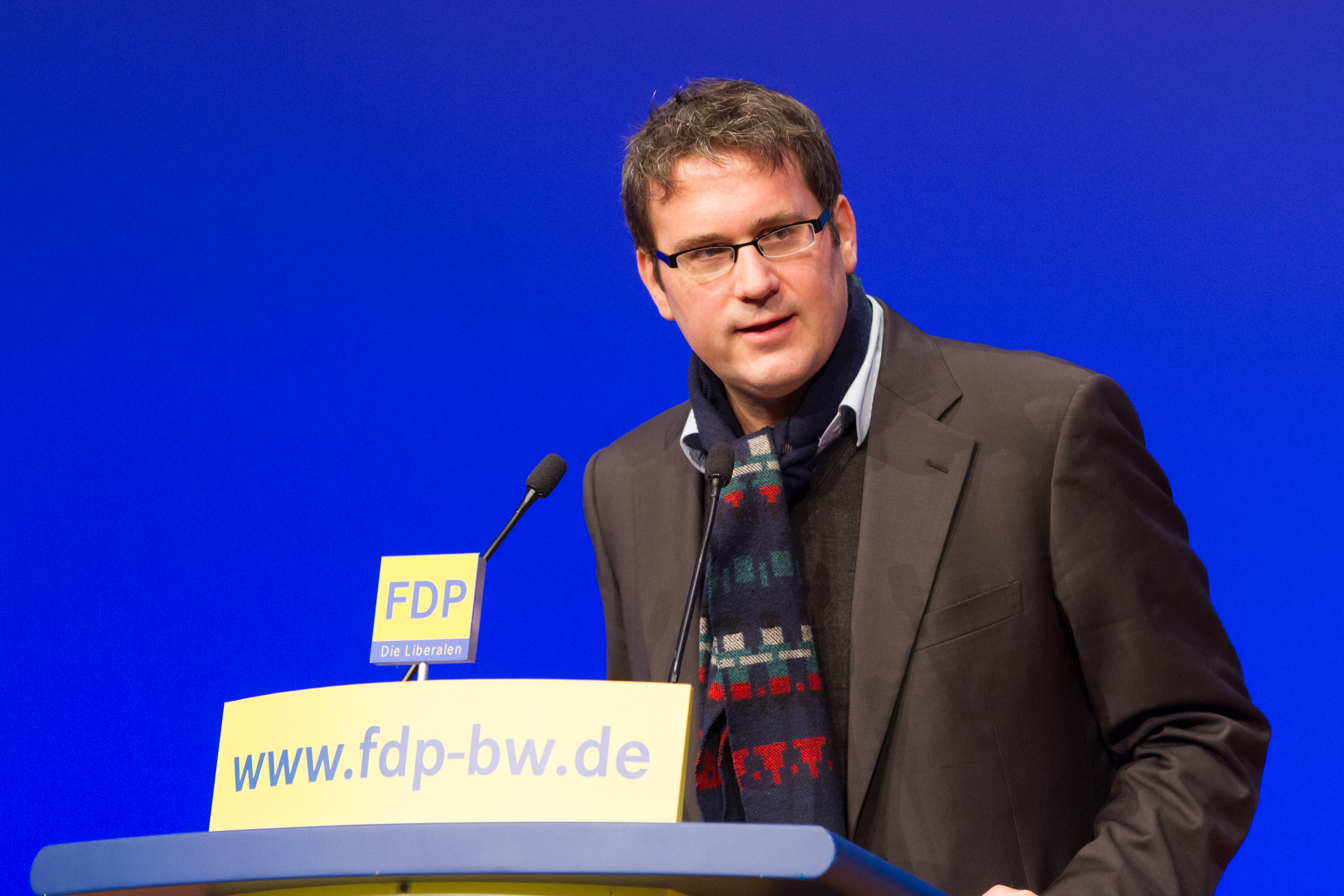

Member of the Bundestag for Baden-Württemberg
- Incumbent
- Assumed office 1 May 2021
- Constituency: FDP List

Personal details
- Born: 23 May 1974 (age 52) Stuttgart, West Germany
- Party: Free Democratic Party
- Education: University of Tübingen

Christopher Gohl (born 23 May 1974) is a German political scientist and politician of the Free Democratic Party (FDP) who has been serving as a member of the Bundestag from the state of Baden-Württemberg since 2021.

== Political career ==
Gohl became a member of the Bundestag in 2021 when he replaced Christian Jung who had resigned. In parliament, he has since been serving on the Committee on Transport and Digital Infrastructure.
