= Janey Gohl =

American beauty pageant contestant

- Born: Janey Lee Gohl; August 18, 1956 (age 70); St. Cloud, Minnesota, U.S.
- Education: St. Cloud State University; William Mitchell College of Law; Pepperdine University
- Beauty pageant titleholder
- Title: Miss Minnesota USA 1978
- Major competition: Miss USA 1978

Janey Lee Gohl (born August 18, 1956) is a beauty queen from St. Cloud, Minnesota who has competed in the Miss USA pageant.

Gohl was born to Roger and Bernice Bromenschenkel Gohl. She has three sisters and two brothers.

Gohl won the Miss Minnesota USA 1978 title in her first attempt and represented Minnesota at the Miss USA 1978 pageant in Charleston, South Carolina.

Gohl graduated from Cathedral High School in 1974 and attained a Bachelor of Arts degree in journalism from St. Cloud State University the same weekend she won her state title. In 1983, she earned a law degree from William Mitchell College of Law in St. Paul, Minnesota. In 2002, she added to her academic credentials a Master of Science in Organization Development (MSOD) from Pepperdine University's top-ranked MSOD program. She works in the Human Resources/Organization Development field.
