= Christiane Gohl =

German author (born 1958)

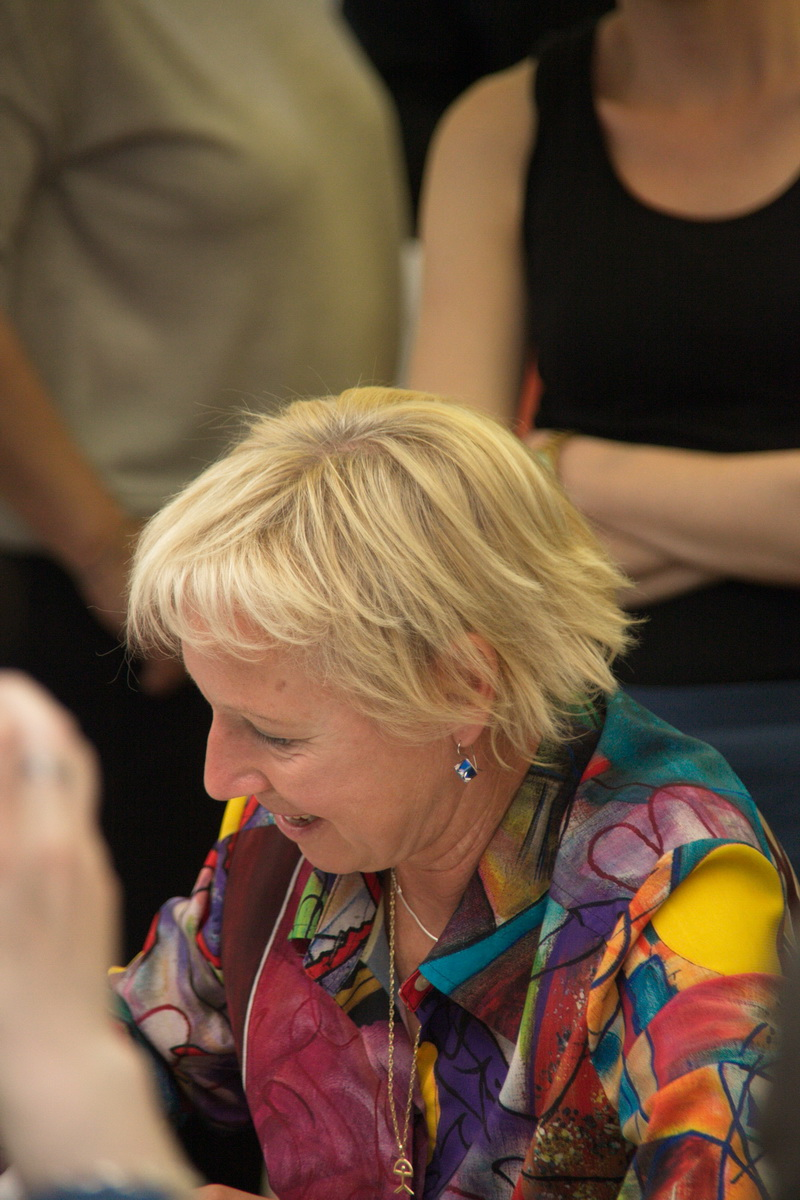
- Born: 1958 (age 67–68); Bochum, Germany
- Writing career
- Pen name: Ricarda Jordan, Sarah Lark, Elisabeth Rothberg
- Language: German
- Genre: Children's literature

Christiane Gohl (born 1958) is a German author who uses the pen names Ricarda Jordan, Sarah Lark and Elisabeth Rotenberg. In addition to writing children's books centered on horses, she is also a novelist.

== Biography ==
Born in Bochum, Gohl studied history and literature. Working as a travel guide, she discovered New Zealand where she took an immediate liking to the people and the scenery. Using the pen name Sarah Lark, several of her novels are set in New Zealand while she uses Ricarda Jordan as her pen name for her historical novels. Gohl has also worked as an elementary school teacher and a commercial writer.

She became interested in horses at the age of 10 and now shows special concern for the art of riding and the care and treatment of horses. Several of her novels and non-fiction works on horses have become best sellers. Christiane Gohl now lives on a farm near Almería in the south of Spain where she not only writes but also cares for retired horses.

== Selected works ==
=== Christiane Gohl ===
- Ein Pflegepferd für Julia. Kosmos, 1993, ISBN 978-3-440-06483-2.
- Julia und das weiße Pony. Kosmos, 1993, ISBN 978-3-440-06607-2.
- Julia und der Hengst aus Spanien. Kosmos, 1993, ISBN 978-3-440-06688-1.
- Julias erster Wanderritt. Kosmos, 1994, ISBN 978-3-440-06689-8.
- Julia und das Springpferd. Kosmos, 1995, ISBN 978-3-440-06712-3.
- Ein Traumpferd für Julia. Kosmos, 1996, ISBN 978-3-440-06702-4.
- Julia und ihr Fohlen. Kosmos, 1996, ISBN 978-3-440-06722-2.
- Julia – Aufregung im Reitverein. Kosmos, 1997, ISBN 978-3-440-07276-9.
- Julia – Ferienjob mit Islandpferden. 2002, ISBN 3-570-21026-X.
- Julia und der Dressurstar. Kosmos, 1998, ISBN 978-3-440-07547-0.
- Julia – Neue Pferde, neue Freunde. Kosmos, 1998, ISBN 978-3-440-07548-7.
- Julia – Ein Pferd für zwei. Kosmos, 1999, ISBN 978-3-440-07660-6.
- Julia und der Pferdeflüsterer. Kosmos, 1999, ISBN 978-3-440-07659-0.
- Julia – Reitbeteiligung gesucht. Kosmos, 2000, ISBN 978-3-440-08019-1.
- Julia und die Nachtreiter. Kosmos, 2000, ISBN 978-3-440-08025-2.
- Julia und das Reitturnier. Kosmos, 2001, ISBN 978-3-440-08523-3.
- Julia – Eifersucht im Reitstall. Kosmos, 2001, ISBN 978-3-440-08871-5.
- Julia – Ferien im Sattel. Kosmos, 2002, ISBN 978-3-440-09031-2.
- Julia – Reiterglück mit Hindernissen. 2005, ISBN 3-570-21408-7.
- Julia am Ziel ihrer Träume. 2006, ISBN 978-3-570-21409-1.
- Ein Pony für uns beide. 2009, ISBN 978-3-570-21997-3.
- Freizeitpferde selber schulen. Jungpferde erziehen, ausbilden, anreiten. Kosmos, 1997, ISBN 978-3-440-07106-9.
- Lea und die Pferde – Das Glück der Erde... Boje Verlag, 2011, ISBN 978-3-8432-0038-7.
- Lea und die Pferde – Pferdefrühling. Boje Verlag, 2011, ISBN 978-3-8387-0997-0.
- Lea und die Pferde – Das Traumpferd fürs Leben. Boje Verlag, 2011, ISBN 978-3-8432-1045-4.
- Lea und die Pferde – Herzklopfen und Reiterglück. Boje Verlag, 2011, ISBN 978-3-8387-0999-4.
- Lea und die Pferde – Ein Joker für alle Fälle. Boje Verlag, 2011, ISBN 978-3-8387-1000-6.
- Lea und die Pferde – Sommer im Sattel. Boje Verlag, 2011, ISBN 978-3-8387-1001-3.
- Lea und die Pferde – Reitfieber. Boje Verlag, 2011, ISBN 978-3-414-82138-6.
- Lea und die Pferde – Stallgeflüster. Boje Verlag, 2011, ISBN 978-3-8387-1003-7.
- Lea und die Pferde – Pferde, Sonne, Ferienglück. Boje Verlag, 2011, ISBN 978-3-8387-1004-4.
- Lea und die Pferde – Ein Herz für Joker. Boje Verlag, 2011, ISBN 978-3-8387-1005-1.

=== Elisabeth Rotenberg ===
- Von Ponys und Pferden. Oetinger-Verlag, 1998, ISBN 3-7891-4603-X.
- Vom Reiten und Voltigieren. Oetinger-Verlag, 1999, ISBN 3-7891-4605-6.

=== Sarah Lark ===
Neuseelandsaga

1. Im Land der weißen Wolke. Bastei-Lübbe, 2007, ISBN 978-3-404-15713-6, translated as In the Land of the Long White Cloud.
2. Das Lied der Maori. Bastei-Lübbe, 2008, ISBN 978-3-404-15867-6, translated as Song of the Spirits.
3. Der Ruf des Kiwis. Bastei Lübbe, 2009, ISBN 978-3-404-16261-1, translated as Call of the Kiwi.

Kauri-Trilogie

1. Das Gold der Maori. Bastei Lübbe, 2010, ISBN 978-3-7857-6024-6.
2. Im Schatten des Kauribaums. Bastei Lübbe, 2011, ISBN 978-3-7857-6047-5.
3. Die Tränen der Maori-Göttin. Bastei Lübbe, 2012, ISBN 978-3-7857-6058-1.

Neuseelandsaga II

1. Die Zeit der Feuerblüten. Bastei Lübbe, 2013, ISBN 978-3-7857-6071-0 (Erster Band der neuen Serie über die Auswandererin Ida)
2. Der Klang des Muschelhorns. Bastei Lübbe, 2013, ISBN 978-3-7857-2497-2 (Zweiter Band der neuen Serie über die Auswandererin Ida)

Jamaikasaga

1. Die Insel der tausend Quellen. Bastei Lübbe, 2011, ISBN 978-3-7857-2430-9.
2. Die Insel der roten Mangroven. Bastei Lübbe, 2012, ISBN 978-3-7857-2460-6.

Weitere Werke

- Ruf der Dämmerung. Bastei Lübbe, 2012, ISBN 978-3-8432-0047-9 (Jugendbuch)

=== Ricarda Jordan ===
- Die Pestärztin. Bastei-Lübbe, 2009, ISBN 978-3-404-15990-1.
- Der Eid der Kreuzritterin. Bastei-Lübbe, 2010, ISBN 978-3-404-16480-6.
- Das Geheimnis der Pilgerin. Bastei-Lübbe, 2011, ISBN 978-3-404-16081-5.
- Das Erbe der Pilgerin. Bastei-Lübbe, 2012, ISBN 978-3-404-16649-7.
- Die Geisel des Löwen. Bastei-Lübbe, 2013, ISBN 978-3-404-16825-5.
- Tochter der Elbe. Bastei-Lübbe, 2014, ISBN 978-3-404-16984-9.
