= Harry Jowsey =

Australian television personality

- Jowsey in 2021
- Born: 24 May 1997 (age 29); Yeppoon, Queensland, Australia
- Occupations: Television personality; Podcaster; Social media influencer
- Years active: 2018–present

Instagram information
- Page: harryjowsey
- Followers: 4.7 M

TikTok information
- Page: harryjowsey
- Followers: 5.1 M
- Last updated: 4 October 2026
- Website: harryjowsey.com

Harry Jowsey (born 24 May 1997) is an Australian television personality, podcaster, and social media personality. He competed in various reality television series including Too Hot to Handle, The Amazing Race Australia, Love Island Australia, and Dancing with the Stars. In 2025, Jowsey made his acting debut in the romantic comedy film The Wrong Paris. His own reality television series Let's Marry Harry debuted in 2026.

== Career ==
Jowsey won the New Zealand reality television dating show Heartbreak Island with Georgia Bryers in 2018. The couple left with a $100,000 cash prize, but broke up six months later.

In 2021, Jowsey was one of the winners of the first season of the British reality dating game show Too Hot to Handle. That same year, he participated in MTV's Match Me If You Can.

Jowsey appeared on an episode of the Floor Is Lava with season 2 contestant Chase de Moor.

In 2023, Jowsey competed in The Amazing Race Australia 7. He was partnered with Love Island Australia contestant Teddy Briggs and they were eliminated 8th. That same year, he participated on the thirty-second season of Dancing with the Stars. He was partnered with first time pro Rylee Arnold, and they finished in sixth place.

He starred on the second season of Perfect Match in 2024.

On 17 July 2025, Netflix announced that Jowsey would be starring in his own dating series called Let's Marry Harry. The show aired in 2026.

Jowsey made his acting debut in 2025 as Jimmy in the romantic comedy film The Wrong Paris.

== Filmography ==
=== Film ===
Year	Title	Role	Notes
2025	The Wrong Paris	Jimmy	
2027	Horrified	Luke	In production

=== Television ===
Year	Title	Role	Notes
2018	Heartbreak Island	Himself	15 episodes
2021	Too Hot to Handle	Himself	8 episodes
2021	Match Me If You Can	Himself	2 episodes
2022	Floor Is Lava	Himself	1 episode
2023	The Amazing Race Australia 7	Himself	11 episodes
2023	Dancing with the Stars	Himself	9 episodes
2024	Perfect Match	Himself	9 episodes
2026	The Secret Lives of Mormon Wives	Himself	1 episode
2026	Let's Marry Harry	Himself	8 episodes
2026	Let's Marry Harry: Reunion	Himself	1 episode
2026	The Mob	Himself	
