= Blockout 2024 =

Online movement in response to Gaza war

Blockout 2024 (stylized as the hashtag #Blockout2024), variously referred to as Operation Blockout or Celebrity Block Party or Blockout Campaign, was an online movement to block the social media accounts of celebrities and organizations related to their silence over or support for Israel in the Gaza war. A wave of discontent was sparked on social media platforms on May 6, 2024, following the Met Gala, an annual fundraising event. This reaction was prompted by the circulation of photographs featuring celebrities in elaborate attire. A number of these celebrities had not publicly addressed the war, in which continuous Israeli airstrikes by then led to more than 35,000 Palestinians killed. This lack of public commentary on the issue was highlighted and criticized by social media users. Furthermore, the blockout campaign was met with hardline crackdown by social media platforms, most notably Instagram was found suspending dozens of accounts advocating for blockout. By early August, the movement lost its momentum due to suspension of multiple blockout accounts.

== Prelude ==
The Blockout movement started through posts on TikTok after the Met Gala on May 6, 2024. The exclusive $75,000 per ticket fashion event attended by influential celebrities drew comparisons to the class disparity of The Hunger Games, with USA Today columnist Nicole Russell calling it "a tone-deaf charade of excess and hypocrisy." A post by influencer Haley Kalil (known as @haleyybaylee on social media) became widely viewed showed her saying "Let them eat cake" in the style of Marie Antoinette. After recent university campus war protests, the Rafah offensive, and protesters outside the Met Museum, this contrast became the subject of online posts and activism. The release of the song "Hind's Hall" by Macklemore on the same day as the Met Gala was notable, with the lyrics referring to: "The music industry's quiet, complicit in their platform of silence."

Shortly after the event, the blockout movement gained worldwide momentum and recognition, spreading to almost all the world. TikTok account @BlockOut2024 and Instagram account @blockoutcampaign posted a video encouraging users to block celebrities at the Met Gala and all the other celebrities and influencers who remained silent on the Palestinian cause or were either found promoting Israeli brands, but others have attributed the start of the effort to the account @ladyfromtheoutside. This resulted in the hashtags #blockout2024 and #celebrityblocklist starting to trend, alongside #AllEyesOnRafah. Because of the reference to Antoinette, the activism was also referred to as a "digitine" or digital guillotine.

Currently, the only remaining blockout movement is the Blockout Campaign, initiated by Pasdaran Islam, a Pakistan-based Islamic organization. The campaign actively advocates for the blockout of silent and hypocritical influencers and celebrities who, in their view, spread vulgar and immoral content while remaining silent on critical issues that require attention.

== Targeted accounts ==
Several mainstream celebrities were targeted in the movement. Various accounts dedicated to the movement were created on social media platforms such as TikTok and Instagram, which compile lists of celebrities and link their accounts for activists to block. Some of those originally targeted in the campaign posted videos calling for donations to support relief efforts in Gaza, including Lizzo and Chris Olsen. The campaign also gave rise to country-specific lists, such as ones in Malaysia.

== See also ==
- Artists4Ceasefire
- Cancel culture
- Celebrity influence in politics
- Consumer activism
- Hashtag activism
- International reactions to the Gaza war
- Gaza protests in the United States
