= Caribbean Broadcasting Union =

- Formation: 1970; 56 years ago
- Type: Union of broadcasting organisations
- Headquarters: Bridgetown, Barbados
- Members: 31 active members in 17 countries and dependencies
- Official language: English
- Website: www.caribroadcastunion.org

The Caribbean Broadcasting Union (CBU) founded in 1970 is a not-for-profit association of public service and commercial broadcasters in the Caribbean. Its secretariat is located in Barbados.

Beginning in the mid-1980s, the CBU created several regionally syndicated programmes including CaribScope, Caribbean Newsline, Caribbean News Review, Caribbean Business Weekly, Talk Caribbean, the Caribbean Song Festival, Riddim Express and the CaribVision television news exchange, among other programmes.

Leadership of the association is mainly rotated between representatives of the affiliated media houses. On 9 June 2000 the commercial operations of the CBU and the Caribbean News Agency were merged into the Caribbean Media Corporation, also based in Barbados, which has carried on the business of television production begun by the CBU.

The CBU's current mandate includes the facilitation of some broadcast services, representation, and training of the staff of member stations in support of a unified Caribbean community. It holds an Annual General Assembly (AGA) in one of the member nations every August. Member stations are drawn from the 15 member nations of the Caribbean Community, with the exception of Haiti. Other member stations are drawn from several nations in the Caribbean area.

== Membership ==
=== Full members ===
As of May 2026, 23 public and private organizations have full memberships. These organizations range from radio and television broadcasters, newspapers, magazines, and media educational institutions.

Country	Broadcasting organisation	Abbr.	Year
Anguilla	Radio Anguilla		
Antigua and Barbuda	Antigua and Barbuda Broadcasting Service	ABS	
Bahamas	Broadcasting Corporation of the Bahamas	ZNS	
Barbados	Caribbean Broadcasting Corporation	CBC	
Barbados	Starcom Network		
Belize	Greater Belize Media	GBM	
Colombia	Teleislas		2017
Cuba	Institute of Information and Social Communication	ICS	
Curacao	TeleCuracao		
Guyana	National Communications Network	NCN	
Guyana	Newsroom Guyana		
Jamaica	Public Broadcasting Corporation of Jamaica (formerly Jamaica Broadcasting Corporation)	PBSJ (JBC)	
Jamaica	RJRGleaner		
Martinique	Richès Karayib	RK	2026
Montserrat	Radio Montserrat	ZJB	
Saint Kitts and Nevis	ZIZ Broadcasting Corporation	ZIZ	
Suriname	Algemene Televisie Verzorging	ATV	
Suriname	DIME Network		
Trinidad and Tobago	Caribbean Communications Network	CCN	
Trinidad and Tobago	Parliament of Trinidad and Tobago (Corporate Communications Department) (Note: Parliament of Trinidad and Tobago is under the name of Corporate Communications Department and is a department of the Trinidad and Tobago Government)		
Trinidad and Tobago	TTT Limited formerly Trinidad and Tobago Television	TTT	
Trinidad and Tobago	Content Capital TV	WESN	
Turks and Caicos Islands	Radio Turks and Caicos		

=== Associate members ===
As of May 2026, 8 public and private organizations are associate members.

Country	Broadcasting organisation	Abbr.	Year
Barbados	Barbados Government Information Service (Note: Barbados Government Information Service is a department of the Barbados Government.)	BGIS	
Barbados	UWITV Global (University of the West Indies)	UWI	
Belize	Belize Broadcasting Authority (Note: Belize Broadcasting Authority is a agency of the Belize Government, under the Prime Minister's Office.)	BBA	
Grenada	Government Information Service (Note: Government Information Service is a department of the Grenada Government.)		
Guyana	Guyana National Broadcasting Authority (Note: Guyana National Broadcasting Authority is a department of the Guyana Government.)	GNBA	
Jamaica	Caribbean Institute of Media and Communication	CARIMAC	
Jamaica	Creative Production & Training Centre	CPTC	
Trinidad and Tobago	Mersu Caribbean Consulting Group		

=== Former members ===
This is a list of known former full and associate members are found from archived sources. As of September 2025, 20 were found as former members.

Country	Broadcasting organisation	Abbr.	Defunct	Defunct Reason
Anguilla	Kreative Communications Network	KCN	No	
Bermuda	Bermuda Broadcasting Company	BBC	No	
Cuba	Cuban Institute of Radio and Television	ICRT	Yes	Replaced by the Institute of Information and Social Communication.
Dominica	SAT Telecommunications	SAT	Yes	Acquired by Digicel and later rebranded as Digicel Play.
Grenada	Columbus Communications		Yes	
Grenada	Grenada Broadcasting Network	GBN	No	
Guyana	Multi Technology Vision	MTV	No	
Jamaica	Phase 3 Productions		No	
Jamaica	Radio Jamaica	RJR	No	
Martinique	Martinique 1ère		No	
St. Lucia	Government Information Service (Note: Government Information Service is a department of the St. Lucia Government.)		Unknown	
St. Lucia	Radio St. Lucia (rebranded as Saint Lucia FM)	RSL	Formerly was	Shutted down on due to financial reasons. The frequency has been revived by the local government on August 1, 2025 as Saint Lucia FM.
Sint Maarten	Sint Maarten Cable TV (formerly operated by Viya)		Yes	Acquired by the TelEm Group.
Saint Vincent and the Grenadines	National Broadcasting Corporation (NBC Radio)	SVGNBC	No	
Saint Vincent and the Grenadines	Saint Vincent and the Grenadines Broadcasting Corporation (SVG-TV)	SVGBC	No	
Suriname	Surinaamse Televisie Stichting	STVS	No	
Trinidad and Tobago	DirecTV Trinidad		No	
Trinidad and Tobago	Caribbean New Media Group (C TV)	CNMG & C TV	Yes	Replaced by TTT Limited.
US Virgin Islands	Viya		No	

=== Non-member affiliates & associates ===
- North American National Broadcasters Association (NANBA)
- National Association of Broadcasters (NAB)
- World Broadcasting Unions (WBU)
- Commonwealth Broadcasting Association (CBA)
- Caribbean News Agency (CANA)
- European Broadcasting Union (EBU)
- Arab States Broadcasting Union (ASBU)
- Asia-Pacific Broadcasting Union (ABU)
- Union des Radiodiffusion et télévisions Nationales d'Afrique (URTNA)
- Organización de Televisión Iberoamericana (OTI)
- Asociación Internacional de Radiodifusión (AIR)
- Canadian Association of Broadcasters (CBA)

== List of presidents of the CBU ==
- 1970–1973: Ray Smith
- 1973–1975: Leo de Leon
- 1975–1976: Ron Sanders
- 1976–1980: Frits Pengel
- 1980–1984: Terrence Holder
- 1984–1987: Frits Pengel
- 1987–1991: J.A. Lester Spaulding
- 1991–1999: Vic Fernandes
- 1999–2002: Gordon “Butch” Stewart
- 2002–2013: Vic Fernandez
- 2013–2018: Shida Bolai
- 2018–2021: Gary Allen
- 2021–2022: Kayleaser Deveaux-Isaacs
- 2022–2024: Claire Grant
- 2024–present: Anthony Greene

== See also ==
- Caribbean Media Corporation (CMC)
- Latin American Union of News Agencies
