= Radio in Trinidad and Tobago =

The radio programming in Trinidad and Tobago caters to a diverse ethnic demographic. The genesis of radio broadcasting in Trinidad and Tobago began in 1925 with British Rediffusion via a wired relay network. During World War II, the US Armed Forces Radio Service network – WVDI 570 AM Radio began broadcasting in May 1943 from Fort Reid, Chaguaramas. At that time, WVDI mainly serviced the armed forces throughout the Caribbean.

British Rediffusion now Rediffusion (Trinidad) Limited created the Trinidad Broadcasting Company in 1946 which launched Radio Trinidad 730 AM in 1947. On October 13, 1957, Radio Guardian 610 AM was launched with the state acquiring the station and renaming it the National Broadcasting Service or NBS 610 Action Radio on November 1, 1969. NBS went on to launch Radio 100 FM on October 6, 1972, being the first station to broadcast on the FM signal. On March 14, 1976, the Trinidad Broadcasting Company launched 95.1 FM, the first privately owned FM station. On January 1, 1991, Radio 105.1 FM became the first station to broadcast local and Caribbean content. In 1992, Radio 97.1 FM became the first station to broadcast pure Adult Contemporary. On July 5, 1993, Radio 103.1 FM became the first station to broadcast the East-Indian format. On December 16, 1993, Radio 96.1FM became the first station to broadcast the Urban Caribbean, R&B and Hip-Hop format. In 1997, Radio 102.1 FM became the first station to broadcast the "Talk Radio" format.

The stations below cover both the AM and FM broadcast bands. Where possible, nicknames of stations have been given alongside the frequencies.

== AM stations ==
The last AM Station, Radio Trinidad 730AM, ceased broadcasting on April 5, 2015 and rebranded as Sky 99.5 on the FM band.

== FM Stations ==
Callsign	Frequency	City/Town, Island	Network affiliation/Owner	Format	Transmitter Location
Pulse 89.5 FM	89.5	Signal Hill, Tobago	Trico Industries Ltd	Variety	Scarborough, Tobago
WACK Radio	90.1	San Fernando, Trinidad	KMP Music Group Ltd.	Calypso, Soca	San Fernando Hill.
Radio 90.5	90.5	Valsayn, Trinidad	Central Radio 90FM Limited	Local Indian music, Bollywood	Cumberland Hill
Talk City 91.1	91.1	Port of Spain, Trinidad	TTT Limited	Talk	Cumberland Hill
Mad FM Not available anymore	91.5	Port of Spain, Trinidad	Caribbean Broadcasting Systems and Services Limited	Hip Hop, R&B, Reggae, Urban & Variety.	Port of Spain, Trinidad
The Street 91.9 FM	91.9	Port of Spain, Trinidad	TriniBashment Ltd.	Soca	Maraval, Trinidad and Tobago
Taj 92.3	92.3	Port of Spain, Trinidad	Side Walk Radio	Local Indian and Bollywood	Curepe, Trinidad and Tobago
Radio Tambrin	92.7	Scarborough, Tobago	Kaisoca Productions Ltd.	Talk	Scarborough, Trinidad and Tobago
Hott 93	93.5	Port of Spain, Trinidad	One Caribbean Media (OCM)	Pop, Rock, R&B & Variety	Cumberland Hills, Monserrat Hills
Boom Champions 94.1	94.1	Port of Spain, Trinidad	Superior Infinite Productions Limited	Urban	Morne Leotaud
Star 947	94.7	Port of Spain, Trinidad	Trinidad and Tobago Radio Network	Pop, Rock, R&B & Variety	Cumberland Hill
95 The Ultimate One	95.1	Port of Spain, Trinidad	The TBC Radio Network	Pop, Rock, R&B & Variety	Cumberland Hill
I95.5FM	95.5	Port of Spain, Trinidad	One Caribbean Media (OCM)	News/Talk	Cumberland Hills, Monserrat Hills
WEFM	96.1	Port of Spain, Trinidad	Trinidad and Tobago Radio Network	Dancehall, Reggae, Soca, Urban	Cumberland Hills
Red 96.7 FM	96.7	Port of Spain, Trinidad	One Caribbean Media (OCM)	Urban	Monserrat Hill
Music Radio 97	97.1	Port of Spain, Trinidad	Telemedia Limited (CL Communications)	Easy Listening	Cumberland Hill
Addictive Radio 97.5 FM	97.5	Port of Spain, Trinidad	Entertainment Ltd.	Soca, R&B & Variety	North, Ariapita Avenue
ISAAC 98.1 [The Promise]	98.1	Port of Spain, Trinidad	Family Focus Broadcasting Network	Gospel	North Post, Diego Martin
BBC World Service	98.7	Port of Spain, Trinidad	British Broadcasting Corporation	World News	Cumberland Hill
Next FM	99.1	Port of Spain, Trinidad	TTT Limited	Soca	Cumberland Hill
Sky 99.5	99.5	Port of Spain, Trinidad	The TBC Radio Network	Religious	Cumberland Hill, San Fernando Hill
Sweet FM	100.1	Port of Spain, Trinidad	TTT Limited	Soca, Adult Urban [R&B]	Cumberland Hill
Slam 100.5	100.5	Port of Spain, Trinidad	The TBC Radio Network	Reggae, Soca, Urban	Cumberland Hills
Scorch FM	101.1	Port of Spain, Trinidad	Scorch Limited	Soca	Cumberland Hills
Fire 101.7 FM	101.7	San Fernando, Trinidad	Heritage Communications Limited	Indian/Bollywood/Pop/Mix Music	San Fernando, Trinidad and Tobago
Lit102.3fm	102.3	Port of Spain, Trinidad	Radio Vision	Pop, Rock, R&B & Variety	Monserrat Hill
Radio Jaagriti 102.7 FM	102.7	Tunapuna, Trinidad	Central Broadcasting Services Ltd.	Hindu religious programming	Monserrat Hill
103FM	103.1	Barataria, Trinidad	Winfield Aleong Broadcasting Company Ltd.	Local Indian/Bollywood	Monserrat Hill
Platinum Hits 103.5FM	103.5	Port of Spain, Trinidad	United Cinemas Limited	AC	Cumberland Hill
Heartbeat 104.1FM	104.1	Valsayn, Trinidad	Radio News Network	Adult Urban [R&B]	Cumberland Hill
MORE FM	104.7	Port of Spain, Trinidad	PBCT Limited	Talk	Long Mountain, North Post
Vibe CT 105.1 FM	105.1	Port of Spain, Trinidad	The TBC Radio Network	Sport/ Variety	Cumberland Hills
The Parliament Channel	105.5	Port of Spain, Trinidad	Government of Trinidad and Tobago	Talk	Cumberland Hill
Sangeet 106.1 FM	106.1	Port of Spain, Trinidad	The TBC Radio Network	Local Indian/Bollywood/Variety	Monserrat Hill
Freedom 106.5	106.5	Port of Spain, Trinidad	The TBC Radio Network	Talk	Cumberland Hill
Radio Toco	106.7	Toco, Trinidad	Toco Multicultural Foundation for Integrated Development	Community News	Toco, Trinidad and Tobago
W 107.1 FM [The Word]	107.1	Port of Spain, Trinidad	One Caribbean Media (OCM)	Christian	Morne Chaleur
107.7 FM Music for Life	107.7	Port of Spain, Trinidad	Trinidad and Tobago Radio Network	Soul	Monserrat Hill

== HD Radio Stations ==
- Slam 100.5
- Star 947

== Defunct ==
- Radio Trinidad - Inspirational Radio 730 AM (Golden Network)
- Voice of Rediffusion (Silver Network)
- NBS Radio 610AM (Radio Guardian)
- Love 94.1FM Heart And Soul (Gospel Station)
- Radio Shakti 97.5FM
- 98.9 YES FM (Formerly Radi-YO)
- WMJX Radio 100.5FM Smooth Jazz
- Ebony Radio 104.1FM
- Radio Prime 106.1FM
- WIN Radio 101.1FM
- Power 102.1FM
- Aakash Vani 106.5FM
- Mad FM 91.5FM
- U97.5 FM Hot Like Pepper/Multicultural Radio

== Other Links ==
- Communications in Trinidad and Tobago
- Trinidad and Tobago Amateur Radio Society
