= TV 4 (Trinidad and Tobago) =

Television station in Trinidad and Tobago

Education Channel (TV4)
- Current TV4 logo
- Country: Trinidad and Tobago
- Broadcast area: Trinidad and Tobago
- Headquarters: TIC Building, Lady Young Road, Morvant, Trinidad and Tobago

Programming
- Language: English

Ownership
- Owner: Ministry of Education

History
- Launched: January 15, 1992
- Closed: August 15, 2017
- Replaced by: Education Channel
- Former names: Government Information Services Limited (GISL); The National Carnival Commission of Trinidad and Tobago (NCC); The Information Channel (TIC); Audio Visual Media Television (AVM Television)

Availability

Terrestrial
- 9YL-TV: 4 (Port-of-Spain)
- 9YM-TV: 16 (St. James)

Education Channel TV4 formerly "Government Information Services Limited" (Our TV4), "The National Carnival Commission of Trinidad and Tobago" (NCC4), "The Information Channel" (TIC) and "AVM Television", is a free-to-air television station serving Trinidad and Tobago on Channels 4 & 16 with its studios located at TIC Building, Lady Young Road, Morvant, Trinidad and Tobago.

== History ==
In the 1970s, radio and television broadcast veterans Bobby Thomas, Bryan Waller, and brothers Arnold & Dale Kolasingh set up Audio Visual Media (AVM) Caribbean Ltd, a production house that focused on producing commercials and local current affairs programmes. In 1990 AVM Caribbean Ltd went on to become AVM Television. However, before commencement of commercial transmission, the Morvart complex was looted during the 1990 attempted coup resulting in loss of equipment. On January 15 1992, AVM Television was launched and became the second privately owned broadcast station in Trinidad and Tobago, the first being the Caribbean Communications Network Channels 6 & 18 (CCN TV6). AVM was best known for its American based Public Service Announcement commercials and local programming such as Good Morning T&T, The Midday Show, Head Start, On Track, Caribbean Sports Digest, Words, Books & Letters, Cross Country, Painting for Pleasure and Distance Learning TV. Cable feeds from the Sci-Fi Channel and the USA Network was provided occasionally on weekends after station sign-off.

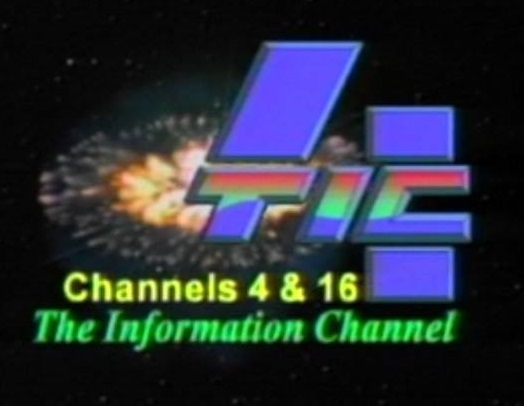
"The Information Channel" Ident 1997–2005

Although the station had some market share, it was largely unprofitable due to insufficient advertising support and the passing of its main founder Dale Kolasingh. Unable to maintain operations, by February 1997 AVM was acquired by the state and merged with the then state owned International Communications Network (ICN) and re-branded "The Information Channel" (TIC). This move was to expand the state's range of educational and information programming as part of an effort to fulfill distance education plans. Cable feeds from the Wisdom Channel and CCTV News China was provided after station sign-off.

As a restructuring initiative by the state, The International Communications Network was itself re-branded to the National Broadcasting Network (NBN) in 1999. Because of continual financial losses by the parent company NBN, dated programming from Trinidad and Tobago Television (TTT) was shifted to The Information Channel in an effort to gain some form of market share but this move failed. As the years passed, the station and by extension NBN continued to suffer heavy financial losses. A decision was made by the state, and on January 15, 2005, NBN was shut down.

The station facilities at Morvant were leased to the National Carnival Commission and the channel was rebranded NCC TV4 to broadcast the Carnival celebrations scheduled to take place in February of that year. Traditionally held on TTT until its closure, NCC TV4 became the main outlet for the National Lotteries Online Draws, including Play Whe, Cash Pot and Lottery Classic from January 15, 2005, until the Caribbean New Media Group, C TV acquired the draws sometime in 2009. Other local programming that was once on TTT moved to NCC TV4 to continue broadcasting.

In 2011, under the management of the Government Information Services Limited (GISL), the station was re-branded Channel 4 – OUR TV broadcasting cultural, sport and state programming. In October 2015, it was found that GISL was suffering from huge financial losses and was subject to bloated budgets, malpractice and political interference. In March 2016, recommendations were made to dissolve the state company and to dispose of its television station TV4. In May 2017, the state commenced the winding up process and to have the company fully shut down by September 30, 2017. On August 15, 2017, the station facilities located on Lady Young Road, Morvant had its final broadcast and was shut down after 25 years of broadcasting. Archives of GISL and its predecessors are now in the custody of the reinstated TTT Limited.

After GISL's closure, the Channel 4 & 16 frequencies was used to temporarily simulcast the Parliament Channel. On August 28, 2020, it was announced that Channels 4 & 16 was assigned to the Ministry of Education and be re-launched for the virtual re-opening of the New Academic Year 2020-2021 amid school closures as a result of the COVID-19 pandemic. On September 2, 2020, the Education Channel was launched broadcasting live instructional material exclusively from 8:00am to 2:00pm with reruns on evenings. Programs include Open Classroom, S.E.A Time and the Sesame Street Workshop for early childhood students. Subjects include Mathematics, Science, English Language Arts, Spanish, Music, Drama, Visual & Performing Arts, Information & Communication Technology (ICT), and Agriculture.

== News and Current Affairs ==
AVM provided local news at 6:00am, 12:00pm, 7:00pm and 11:00pm daily with an international news broadcast by PBS NewsHour with Jim Lehrer at 10:00pm. As The Information Channel, it had its own 7:00pm news until it was decided to simulcast the popular "Panorama" evening news from TTT to cut costs. The international broadcast by PBS at 10:00pm continued together with news provided by Deutsche Welle News Journal on evenings until the closure of TIC in 2005. As NCC-TV, news was originally broadcast twice daily except on weekends at 6:00am and 6:32pm, presented by former TTT news anchor John Victor. As GISL, the station simulcast the 7:00pm Evening News and Good Morning T&T from C-TV on weekdays.

== Network slogan ==
- It must be AVM! (1992–1996)
- The Information Channel. (1997–2005)
- Cherishing our culture. (2005–2011)
- OUR TV (2011–2017)
