= Dominic Kalipersad =

Dominic Kalipersad (/ˈkælɪpərˌsæd/ KAL-ip-ər-sad;) is a veteran journalist, and one of the most recognizable faces in Trinidad and Tobago. He is the Group Head of News at Caribbean Communications Network (CCN) Limited in Port-of-Spain, where he has taken the flagship television arm, CCN TV6, under his wing. Kalipersad is of Indo-Trinidadian descent through his father and Cocoa panyol descent through his mother.

Kalipersad was previously the Editor In Chief of the Trinidad Guardian newspaper which he modernized from its old broadsheet format into a tabloid.

He was also the Programme Director at Trinidad Broadcasting Company Ltd after serving as News Director there.

Kalipersad is best known as the principal news anchor of Panorama, the 7:00 pm flagship newscast of the now defunct Trinidad and Tobago Television (TTT), from the late 1970s to early 1990s. He was later Programme Director at the Trinidad Broadcasting Company, and the News Director and anchor at CCN TV6, the position of which he is again the holder.

While heading the Trinidad Guardian for eleven years, he also served at Cable News Channel Three (CNC3) as a news anchor filling in for then news anchor, Carla Foderingham with Shelly Dass.

In 1990, Dominic Kalipersad was one of the hostages at Trinidad and Tobago Television during the Jamaat al Muslimeen coup attempt. He refused to be specially selected for release in an exchange negotiated between the then NAR government and the hostage-takers, declaring: "I am not leaving unless everyone (his fellow hostages) else leaves!"
