= Commonwealth Broadcasting Association =

Organization

- Logo of the CBA
- Abbreviation: CBA
- Formation: 15 February 1945; 81 years ago
- Type: Non-governmental non-profit
- Purpose: Representative body for broadcasters
- Headquarters: London, United Kingdom
- Members: 102 members and affiliates
- Secretary General: Sally-Ann Wilson
- Parent organisation: Commonwealth of Nations
- Website: www.cba.org.uk

The Commonwealth Broadcasting Association (CBA) is a representative body for public service broadcasters throughout the Commonwealth, founded in 1945. A not-for-profit non-government organisation, the CBA is funded by subscriptions from 102 members and affiliates from 54 countries. The stated goal of the CBA is to promote best practices in public service broadcasting and to foster freedom of expression. It also serves to provide support and assistance to its members through training, bursaries, consultancies, networking opportunities and materials for broadcast.

The CBA holds a biennial general conference, with the last one held in Glasgow, Scotland, United Kingdom in 2014. It also aims to provide consultancy to member organisations in areas of management and finance and help local organisers who need specialised help in running broadcast-related workshops. In addition it offers a number of bursaries to full-time employees of its member organisations to enhance their skills and knowledge.

In 2014, the organization unanimously voted to change its name to Public Media Alliance.

== History ==
The CBA traces its roots to a broadcasting conference on 15 February 1945 between Australia, Canada, India, New Zealand, South Africa and the United Kingdom. This brought together representatives of the broadcasting organisations that had co-operated closely in reporting the Second World War and was held in the council chamber of Broadcasting House in London.

The title "Commonwealth Broadcasting Association" was adopted in Malta in 1974 as well as the CBA charter. It stipulates that membership "shall be open to publicly owned national public service broadcasting organisations, or groups of such organisations, which are responsible for the planning, production and presentation of broadcast programmes in Commonwealth countries". This was modified in 1995 to allow for membership of commercial companies with a commitment to public service broadcasting and to allow for affiliate membership.

== Membership ==
=== CBA Full Members ===
Australia

- Australian Broadcasting Corporation
- Special Broadcasting Service

Bahamas

- Broadcasting Corporation of the Bahamas (ZNS-TV/ZNS-1)

Bangladesh

- Bangladesh Betar (Radio)
- Bangladesh Television

Barbados

- Caribbean Broadcasting Corporation
- Starcom Network

Botswana

- Botswana Department of Broadcasting Services

Brunei

- Radio Television Brunei

Cameroon

- Cameroon Radio Television

Canada

- Canadian Broadcasting Corporation
- TV Ontario

Cayman Islands

- Radio Cayman 1

Cyprus

- Cyprus Broadcasting Corporation

Eswatini

- Eswatini Broadcasting and Information Service
- Eswatini Television Authority

Ghana

- Ghana Broadcasting Corporation

Gibraltar

- Gibraltar Broadcasting Corporation

Grenada

- Grenada Broadcasting Network

Guyana

- National Communications Network

India

- All India Radio
- Doordarshan
- Lok Sabha Television
- New Delhi Television

Jamaica

- CVM Communications Group
- RJR Communications Group

Kenya

- Kenya Broadcasting Corporation
- Nation Broadcasting Division

Lesotho

- Lesotho National Broadcasting Service

Malawi

- Malawi Broadcasting Corporation

Malaysia

- Radio Television Malaysia

Maldives

- MNBC (MNBC One/Voice of Maldives)

Malta

- RTM (RTM)

Mauritius

- Mauritius Broadcasting Corporation

Montserrat

- Radio Montserrat

Mozambique

- Independent Television of Mozambique
- Rádio Moçambique
- Soico Television
- Televisão de Moçambique

Namibia

- Namibian Broadcasting Corporation

New Zealand

- Māori Television
- Radio New Zealand
- Television New Zealand

Nigeria

- Channels TV
- Daar Communications
- Federal Radio Corporation of Nigeria
- Gateway Radio, Ogun State Broadcasting
- Nigerian Television Authority
- Voice of Nigeria

Pakistan

- Eye Television Network Limited (renamed as Hum Network)
- Geo TV
- Pakistan Broadcasting Corporation
- Pakistan Television Corporation

Papua New Guinea

- EM TV

Rwanda

- Rwanda Bureau of Information and Broadcasting

Saint Kitts and Nevis

- Ziz Broadcasting Corporation

Saint Vincent and the Grenadines

- National Broadcasting Corporation

Samoa

- Samoa Quality Broadcasting Corporation

Seychelles

- Seychelles Broadcasting Corporation

Singapore

- Mediacorp

Sierra Leone

- Sierra Leone Broadcasting Services

Solomon Islands

- One News Limited

South Africa

- e.tv
- South African Broadcasting Corporation

Sri Lanka

- The Capital Maharaja Organisation Limited
  (MBC Networks and MTV Channel)

Tanzania

- ITV Independent Television Tanzania
- Tanzania Broadcasting Corporation

Tonga

- Tonga Broadcasting Commission

Trinidad and Tobago

- Caribbean New Media Group
- CCN TV6

Uganda

- Uganda Broadcasting Corporation

United Kingdom

- British Broadcasting Corporation
- Islam Channel
- Manx Radio

Zambia

- Zambia National Broadcasting Corporation

== See also ==
- European Broadcasting Union
- Asia-Pacific Broadcasting Union
- World Radio Network
- North American Broadcasters Association
- Caribbean Broadcasting Union
- Commonwealth Press Union
