= Ken Gordon (Trinidad and Tobago politician) =

Trinidad and Tobago politician

Kenneth Gordon
- Born: 1930 (age 95–96)
- Occupations: Businessman; politician

Kenneth Gordon (born 1930) is a Trinidadian businessman and former politician.

== Biography ==
After attending Saint Mary's College in Port of Spain, Trinidad, he went away to the United States and the United Kingdom for further studies. He entered broadcasting in 1949 as a radio announcer for Radio Trinidad. He later became chairman of a conglomerate. In 1986 he was appointed a Minister of Tourism under the National Alliance for Reconstruction as a senator.

He married three times, his present wife being Marguerite Gordon. He has four children.

He was instrumental in introducing the first private television station in the English Caribbean, CCN TV6, and Prime Radio, which was owned by Trinidad and Tobago Express Newspapers Limited, in 1991. He was the chairman of that company until 2006 when he became chairman of the West Indies Cricket Board. On 28 October 2011, he was appointed Chairman of the Trinidad and Tobago Integrity Commission.

His autobiography, Getting it Write: Winning Caribbean Press Freedom, came out in 1999 from Ian Randle Publishers.
