= Francesca Hawkins =

Trinidad and Tobago news presenter

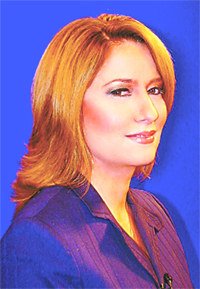
Francesca Hawkins

Francesca Hawkins is a television news presenter and public relations specialist in Trinidad and Tobago. She is a frontline presenter for CNC3 Television. She is the current president of the Media Association of Trinidad and Tobago.

== Media career ==
At 17 years old, Hawkins was one of the youngest voices put on the air at Radio Trinidad. She instantly attracted audiences, particularly the younger age groups and set about including local artists in her formats, a practice that is now a norm, but at that time local artistes were given little airtime. Amid this background, Hawkins made her debut.

Hawkins's television career began at, the age of 21 when she was asked to serve as a frontline news presenter at Trinidad and Tobago Television under the guidance of veteran broadcaster Jones P. Madeira. In the mid-1980s she continued to work for the Trinidad Broadcasting Company as a radio announcer. She later moved to the Caribbean Communications Network where she worked as an announcer for Prime 106 FM.

The Caribbean Communications Network launched its own television station in 1991 and Hawkins served as the main presenter of The TV6 News on CCN TV6 from its inception until 1997.

Hawkins was the face and voice of TV6 in the early 1990s. In addition to her role as primary anchorwoman, she presented a wide range of promotional and special broadcasts such as the station's yearly carnival coverage and other cultural events.

Following her departure from TV6, Hawkins returned to the state-run Trinidad and Tobago Television, where she served as the coordinator of special projects, as well as co-anchor of the nightly news programme, Panorama. In 1999, she left the station to work as a communications officer at the Office of the Prime Minister.

Hawkins returned to the broadcasting arena in 2001 as the morning voice of Hott 93.5FM.

In 2006 she co-hosted and co-presented "Total Football", the only local TV show to follow the historic journey of the National Football Team, Soca Warriors, to the Germany 2006 World Cup. Jamaal Shabaaz, Angus Eve ad Michael McCommie, all football professionals were part of the Total Football team.

In mid-2006 she joined Cable News Channel 3, where she presents various news programmes.

She was also among the first group of students to graduate from the University of the West Indies BA FILM program in 2009, with an honors degree. The Trinidad and Tobago Film Festival recognized her work on the documentary "Siege" which explored for the first time on film, the experiences of media workers who were held hostage at Trinidad and Tobago Television during the 1990 attempted coup.

She works on independent film making projects, in addition to her work as a news presenter.

Served as president, Media Association of Trinidad and Tobago to April 2017.

== Public sector projects ==
Hawkins was a communications officer at the Office of the Prime Minister of the Republic of Trinidad and Tobago and the Ministry of Energy during the term of office of Prime Minister Basdeo Panday.

She was also a member of the organizing committee for the 1999 Miss Universe pageant, which was held in Trinidad and Tobago, where she was the producer for all the local elements of the stage production, including working with the set and costume designers Peter Minshall and Wayne Berkley.

She interned in the Communication Office at the Cabinet Office, Whitehall, London immediately after the 9/11 events in New York.

== Personal life ==
Hawkins is divorced from local businessman, Ross Pollonais. She has two children, Valentina and Jean-Phillipe.
