= Freedom 106.5 =

Radio station in Trinidad and Tobago

Port of Spain; Trinidad and Tobago
- Frequency: 106.5 MHz

Programming
- Language: English
- Format: Talk radio
- Affiliations: CNC3, The TBC Radio Network, Trinidad and Tobago Guardian

Ownership
- Owner: TBC Radio Network; (Guardian Media Limited)
- Sister stations: 95 The Ultimate One, Sky 99.5, Slam 100.5, The Vibe CT 105.1 FM, Sangeet 106.1 FM, Mix 90.1FM

History
- First air date: March 1, 2007
- Former names: Aakash Vani 106.5 FM (2007–2022)

Technical information
- Transmitter coordinates: 10°41′50.9″N 61°32′19.3″W

Links
- Webcast: Listen Live
- Website: https://tbcradionetwork.co.tt/freedom1065/

Freedom 106.5 (106.5 FM) is a radio station Broadcasting from Trinidad and Tobago owned and operated by The TBC Radio Network. The station rebranded from Aakash Vani 106.5FM to Freedom 106.5 in April 2022 with content from Aakash Vani moving to an online format.

Old Aakash Vani 106.5 FM logo
