= Crime Watch (TV series) =

- Presented by: Ian Alleyne
- Narrated by: Ian Alleyne
- Opening theme: "Hunt is On", performed by Kwin (2011-present)
- Ending theme: "Hunt is On" (short version)
- Countries of origin: Trinidad and Tobago
- Original language: Chinese

Production
- Executive producer: Ian Alleyne
- Camera setup: Multi-camera
- Running time: 60 minutes (including commercials)

Original release
- Network: WIN TV (2010-2011); CCN TV6 (2011–2013); CNC3 (2013–2016); Ian Alleyne Network (IAN) (2016-present)
- Release: 2008

Crime Watch is a Trinbagonian television program presented by host Ian Alleyne, to help profile and assist law enforcement in the apprehension of fugitives wanted for various crimes, including murder, rape, kidnapping, child molestation, white collar crime, organized crime, armed robbery and gang violence.

The show airs 6PM weekdays on Synergy TV. It is currently one of the most popular programs in Trinidad and Tobago.

== History ==
Crime Watch started on WIN TV in 2008 airing Thursdays at 6PM. The show gained initial fame until it was later dropped on 17 February 2011 due to complaints of its controversial nature. It was then picked up by CCN TV6 and began airing on 11 April 2011. Disagreements with management resulting from a lawsuit brought against the station after it showed a video clip depicting the rape of a minor, the show's contract was allowed to expire on 10 April 2013.

A new contract was secured with another media house, CNC3, and began airing on 23 April 2013 until the show was axed on 1 September 2016 due to controversial statements made about contracts awarded to complete the Brian Lara Stadium. During its time off air, Crime Watch streamed on Facebook Live until securing a television contract with Synergy TV and began airing on 15 November 2016.

In 2015, the show and its host were profiled by The American Scholar magazine.

Callers are able to dial into the program live and give thoughts and feedback.

Ian Alleyne is currently supported by the Police Commissioner Gary Griffith who has appeared via phone calls on the show multiple times to help resolve criminal occurrences.

Dana Alleyne is a producer of the show.

== On radio ==
- A live stream of CNC3, the channel in which Crime Watch was broadcast on The Vibe CT 105.1 FM and Sangeet 106.1 FM

== See also ==
- Crimewatch, similar program in the United Kingdom
- Crimewatch Singapore, a similar program
