= Paolo Kernahan =

Paolo Kernahan is a television news presenter in the Republic of Trinidad and Tobago.

He was a reporter for Trinidad and Tobago Television (TTT) for several years before moving to CCN TV6 to host the Morning Edition programme. He then returned briefly to TTT where he co-presented the station's morning programme.

Currently, Paolo is the main anchor of the nightly news on Gayelle - The Channel. He is arguably most famous for his show "Skews" on the Gayelle channel in which he mixes wit with candid and comfortably biased opinions on Trinbagonian politics, social issues and the population's lifestyle choices. Though offensive to some more conservative nationals, "Skews" has been widely acclaimed especially by the young adult population of the country. Paolo's no-nonsense "tell-it-exactly-like-I-see-it" commentary is combined with his off-the-wall, sometimes satirical banter to make for interesting viewing.
