= Hazel Ward Redman =

Trinidad and Tobago television personality

Hazel Ward Redman (née Wilson) was a Trinidad and Tobago television personality.

She hosted Teen Dance Party and 12 & Under. She was also known for hosting biology and art-themed programming, with one of her best-known interviews of Aldwyn Roberts, the Mighty Kitchener at his Rain-o-Rama home.

She was the first weather presenter on Trinidad and Tobago Television in 1962. Before that she was at Radio Trinidad, under the rediffusion service known as the 'b station'.

Ward died of cancer on October 27, 2014 at her home in San Fernando, Trinidad & Tobago. She was 79.
