= PanaPress =

African news agency

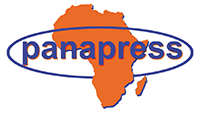
- Industry: News agency
- Founded: 20 July 1979; 46 years ago
- Headquarters: Dakar, Senegal, West Africa
- Website: panapress.com

PanaPress or Pana or PanAfrican News Agency is an African news agency. It has its headquarters in Dakar, Senegal. It was founded on 20 July 1979 in Addis Ababa by the OAU and was relaunched by UNESCO in February 1993. It provides news in English, French, Portuguese, and Arabic. PanaPress works in collaboration with UNESCO.

It contains Pan-African News Agency (PANA), also referred to as Agence d'information panafricaine (AIPA) and Agence panafricaine d'information (API) in French.

== History ==
It was founded on 20 July 1979 in Addis Ababa, with the adoption of a convention by African Ministers of Information. PANA took over the activities of the Union des agences d'informations Africaines, which had been set up in April 1963 in Tunis.

PANA was officially inaugurated and commenced news agency activities on 25 May 1983. PANA is a specialised agency of the OAU and has its headquarters in Dakar, Senegal, with regional offices in Khartoum, Sudan; Lusaka, Zambia; Kinshasa, DR Congo; Lagos, Nigeria; and Tripoli, Libya.

== Relevant treaties and protocols ==
- OAU Charter, adopted on 23 May 1963. South Africa was admitted to the OAU on 23 May 1994 and the OAU Charter became binding on South Africa on that same date.
- PANA Convention

All member states of the OAU were members of PANA. South Africa officially became a member of PANA after becoming a member of the OAU on 23 May 1994. The Seventh Ordinary Session of the Conference of African Ministers of Information took place at Sun City in October 1994. This was the first time that an OAU-related activity took place on South African soil.

== See also ==
- PANATV
- Mass media in Africa
- Caribbean Media Corporation (CMC)
- Caribbean Broadcasting Union (CBU)
- Caribbean News Agency (CANA)
