= Marguerite LeWars =

Jamaican beauty pageant contestant

- Born: 1941 (age 84–85); Kingston, Jamaica
- Occupations: Actress, author, model
- Spouse: Ken Gordon
- Children: 1
- Beauty pageant titleholder
- Title: Miss Jamaica
- Years active: 1962–2000
- Major competitions: Miss Jamaica (Winner); Miss Universe 1961 (Unplaced)

Marguerite LeWars (born 1941) is a Jamaican actress and beauty pageant titleholder who was crowned Miss Jamaica 1961 and represented her country at Miss Universe 1961. While serving in that capacity, she played the role of Dr. No's photographer, Annabel Chung, in the first James Bond film Dr. No, in 1962.

== Early life ==
She was born in Kingston, Jamaica, as Marguerite LeWars. She now uses the surname Gordon taken from her second husband. Her father was Russell LeWars, the Government Town Clerk, and her mother a housewife. She is a former Miss Jamaica. She represented Jamaica in Miss Universe in Miami.

== Career ==
Her only screen role was in Dr. No and it was a matter of chance; the production crew of Dr. No encountered her at Kingston airport as they were preparing for filming. LeWars was an employee there at the time and they decided to use her in the film. She was first offered the role of Miss Taro but she was reluctant because of the sexual theme involved. She was then offered the small role of Annabel Chung. In the commentary of the Dr. No DVD release, LeWars reveals that makeup was applied to her face to make her appear partly Asian. She also states that her voice in the film was dubbed over by the filmmakers without her prior knowledge. LeWars was invited to London to dub but declined. In July 2022 LeWars revealed that the real reason for her refusal to dub was that she had been propositioned by the film's director, Terence Young, also claiming Young sexually assaulted her.

LeWars expressed sadness at the news of Sean Connery's passing, calling him, "a fabulous man and very kind to me when we did Dr.No. I had never done anything like that before, never acted in a film, and he was just so kind to me even when I forgot some of my lines, which were not many, he was still such a gentleman." She is also seen in the documentary Inside Dr. No as herself.

LeWars worked at British West Indian Airlines and Lufthansa. She helped start Air Jamaica. LeWars started her own human resource training company, MK Careers, when she was 30. She is a regular columnist on etiquette in the Trinidad Express. LeWars has written two books.

== Personal life ==
She lives in Trinidad and Tobago. Her second husband is Kenneth Gordon who was Trinidadian government minister, was chairman of Caribbean Communications Network (CCN) and president of the West Indies Cricket Board. She has a son, Gregory, and a granddaughter who live in Vancouver. Her sister Barbara was the wife of former Jamaican Prime minister Michael Manley.

== Bibliography ==
- Dancer, the little dog from Mayaro Beach, 1991 (children's book).
- Manners and Entertaining with Marguerite Gordon: A Guide to Caribbean Life and Style (2008)

== Filmography ==
- Dr No (1962) – Annabel Chung (Photographer)
