= National Broadcasting Service =

National Broadcasting Service may refer to any of the following:

- National Broadcasting Service, former name of the Australian Broadcasting Corporation
- National Broadcasting Services of Thailand
- National Broadcasting Service of Trinidad and Tobago, former name of the now-defunct National Broadcasting Network (Trinidad and Tobago)
