= Vibe CT 105.1 FM =

Vibe CT 105.1FM
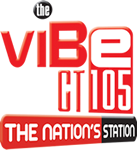

Port of Spain; Trinidad and Tobago
- Broadcast area: Trinidad and Tobago
- Frequency: 105.1 MHz

Programming
- Language: English
- Format: Soca, Sport, Calypso, Variety
- Affiliations: CNC3, The TBC Radio Network

Ownership
- Owner: TBC Radio Network; (Guardian Media Limited)
- Sister stations: 95 The Ultimate One, Sky 99.5, Slam 100.5, Sangeet 106.1 FM, Freedom 106.5, Mix 90.1FM

History
- First air date: January 1, 1991
- Former names: Radio Tempo 105 FM

Technical information
- Transmitter coordinates: 10°41′50.9″N 61°32′19.3″W
- Translator: No
- Repeater: Unknown

Links
- Webcast: Listen Live
- Website: http://www.vibect1051.com

Vibe CT 105.1 FM is a radio station broadcasting from Trinidad and Tobago owned and operated by Guardian Media Limited. The station first started broadcasting on New Years Day, 1 January 1991 as Radio Tempo 105FM but was later rebranded as Vibe CT 105.1, the first Station in T&T to offer an all formatted local music content. The station also touts as being the sports leader as it broadcasts live the majority of the sporting events taking place in the region.

Akhenaton "Ken" Simmons worked at the radio station after years of working at Ebony 104.1 FM.

== See also ==
- Guardian Media Limited
- 96WEFM
- The TBC Radio Network
- CNC3
- Trinidad and Tobago Guardian
