= Sky 99.5 =

Radio station in Trinidad and Tobago

Sky 99.5fm

Port of Spain; Trinidad and Tobago
- Frequency: 99.5 MHz

Programming
- Language: English
- Format: Religious
- Affiliations: CNC3, Trinidad and Tobago Guardian

Ownership
- Owner: TBC Radio Network; (Guardian Media Limited)
- Sister stations: 95 The Ultimate One, Slam 100.5, The Vibe CT 105.1 FM, Sangeet 106.1 FM, Freedom 106.5, Mix 90.1FM

History
- First air date: 5 April 2015
- Former names: Radio Trinidad, Inspirational Radio 730AM
- Former frequencies: 730 kHz

Technical information
- Transmitter coordinates: 10°41′50.9″N 61°32′19.3″W

Links
- Webcast: Listen Live
- Website: http://www.sky995fm.com

Sky 99.5fm (previously Radio Trinidad 730 AM) is a radio station in Trinidad and Tobago owned by the TBC Radio Network.
