= World Broadcasting Unions =

Coordinating body for broadcasting unions

- Formation: 1992; 34 years ago
- Type: Union of broadcasting organisations
- Headquarters: Toronto, Canada
- Members: 9 members
- Website: worldbroadcastingunions.org

The World Broadcasting Unions (WBU) is the coordinating body for continental broadcasting unions. Founded in 1992, it's a coordinating body at the international broadcasting level. The Toronto-based North American Broadcasters Association (NABA) acts as secretariat for the WBU.

== Members ==
The broadcasting unions who are members of the WBU are:

- African Union of Broadcasting (AUB/UAR)
- Arab States Broadcasting Union (ASBU)
- Asia-Pacific Broadcasting Union (ABU)
- Association for International Broadcasting (AIB/AIR)
- Caribbean Broadcasting Union (CBU)
- Commonwealth Broadcasting Association (CBA)
- European Broadcasting Union (EBU/UER)
- North American Broadcasters Association (NABA)
- Organización de Telecomunicaciones de Iberoamérica (OIT/OTI)
