= Dreevay =

Television magazine show in Trinidad and Tobago

Dreevay is a mock television magazine show in Trinidad and Tobago hosted by Reagan Des Vignes, broadcast Tuesdays at 8 p.m. on Gayelle TV in Trinidad & Tobago. The word "dreevay" being patois for "knocking about", the show ranges from comedy to travelogue and beyond., and has run for at least seven seasons.

The show's most popular segment proved to be Dreevay's Next Top Synergistic Soca Model, which featured judges Tyra Blank (Cherane Peters), who played Reagan's housemate, Twiggy Abdul (Giselle Thompson-Lowe), and Janice Cowell (Indra Ramcharan), a regular co-host on Dreevay. The winner of season 1 of DNTSSM was Saucy Aww, an outspoken Diva who was up against Cry Baby JJ. The second season of DNTSSM expanded the concept, with an array of "judges" all parodying celebrities and various aspects of both local and international pop culture.

The third season of the Dreevay commenced in April 2009. As of January 2024 only the first season of Dreevay is listed on TV Guide, "The Best of Dreevay", albeit as not being available for streaming. Segments are available on YouTube, however, which demonstrate that it has been in production for at least seven seasons.
