= Alternative Television =

Alternative Television, better known as Trinidad and Tobago Television (TTT) channels 9 VHF and 14 UHF, was a free-to-air state owned television station in Trinidad & Tobago. Launched in late 1983 to develop more local and educational content, its studios were located at 11A Maraval Road, Port of Spain operating alongside and broadcasting separately from the main service, TTT Channels 2 and 13.

Channels 9 & 14 broadcast between the hours of 6:00pm to 11:00pm with a newscast at 9:00pm. It showed American based programming like Crown Court, Rituals, Prisoner, and Butterflies. The channel also aired educational output.

On July 27, 1990, the TTT studios were taken over during the Jamaat al Muslimeen coup attempt. Several employees were held hostage, and the station was used for propaganda by the Jamaat al Muslimeen. During military engagement between the Jamaat and the Trinidad & Tobago Regiment, the studios of Channels 9 and 14 was destroyed permanently by fire.

At or about 1995, Channels 9 & 14 was used to simulcast Channels 2 & 13 until the main station's closure on January 14, 2005.

TTT was relaunched by the state on August 30, 2018, as a free-to-air television network on Channels 9 and 13.
