= Mix 90.1FM =

Mix FM
- Georgetown; Guyana
- Frequency: 90.1 MHz

Programming
- Language: English
- Format: Pop, Rock, R&B and Variety
- Affiliations: CNC3, The TBC Radio Network

Ownership
- Owner: TBC Radio Network; (Guardian Media Limited)
- Sister stations: 95 The Ultimate One, Sky 99.5, Slam 100.5, The Vibe CT 105.1 FM, Sangeet 106.1 FM, Freedom 106.5

History
- First air date: 2016
- Former call signs: iRadio Guyana

Technical information
- Translators: 91.5 MHz, 103.3 MHz

Links
- Webcast: Listen live
- Website: http://www.mix901fm.com/ http://tbcradionetwork.co.tt/mix901fm/

Mix 90.1 FM is a radio station broadcasting in Guyana owned and operated by Trinidadian Company Guardian Media Limited as part of The TBC Radio Network.

== Related ==
- Radio in Guyana
