= Guardian Media Limited =

- Company type: Private
- Traded as: TTSE: GML; TTSE: GMLP
- Industry: Media
- Founded: September 1917
- Headquarters: Port of Spain, Trinidad and Tobago
- Area served: Trinidad and Tobago
- Key people: Gerhard Pettier (Managing Director), Candice Changoor (Chief Financial Officer)
- Products: Newspapers, Radio Stations, Broadcasting
- Divisions: CNC3; Trinidad and Tobago Guardian; TBC Radio Network
- Website: corp.guardian.co.tt

Guardian Media Limited (often referred to as GML) is the media sector of the Trinidadian-based company ANSA McAL, owned by the Sabga family. Its headquarters are located at 22-24 St. Vincent Street, Port of Spain, Trinidad and Tobago. The current chairman is Peter Clarke with the chief financial officer being Candice Changoor as of January 1, 2025 and the managing director Gerhard Pettier as of November 1, 2024. According to the Trinidad Newsday GML's revenue for 2024 was TT$97.9 million.

== Subsidiaries ==
=== Television ===
- CNC3 (100%) (2005)
  - CNC3 Production
  - CNC3 Sports
  - CNC3 News & Current Affairs

=== Press ===
- Trinidad and Tobago Guardian (1917)
  - Business Guardian

=== Radio ===
- TBC Radio Network (100%) (1947)
  - 95 The Ultimate One
  - The Vibe CT 105.1 FM
  - Slam 100.5
  - Sky 99.5
  - Sangeet 106.1 FM
  - Freedom 106.5FM
  - Mix 90.1FM

Previous

- Radio Trinidad

=== Electronic Billboards ===
- The Big Board Company

== See also ==
- One Caribbean Media
- Trinidad and Tobago Television
- Caribbean New Media Group
- Caribbean Media Corporation
