= Jamaat al Muslimeen coup attempt =

1990 attempt by Islamist militants to overthrow the Trinidad and Tobago government

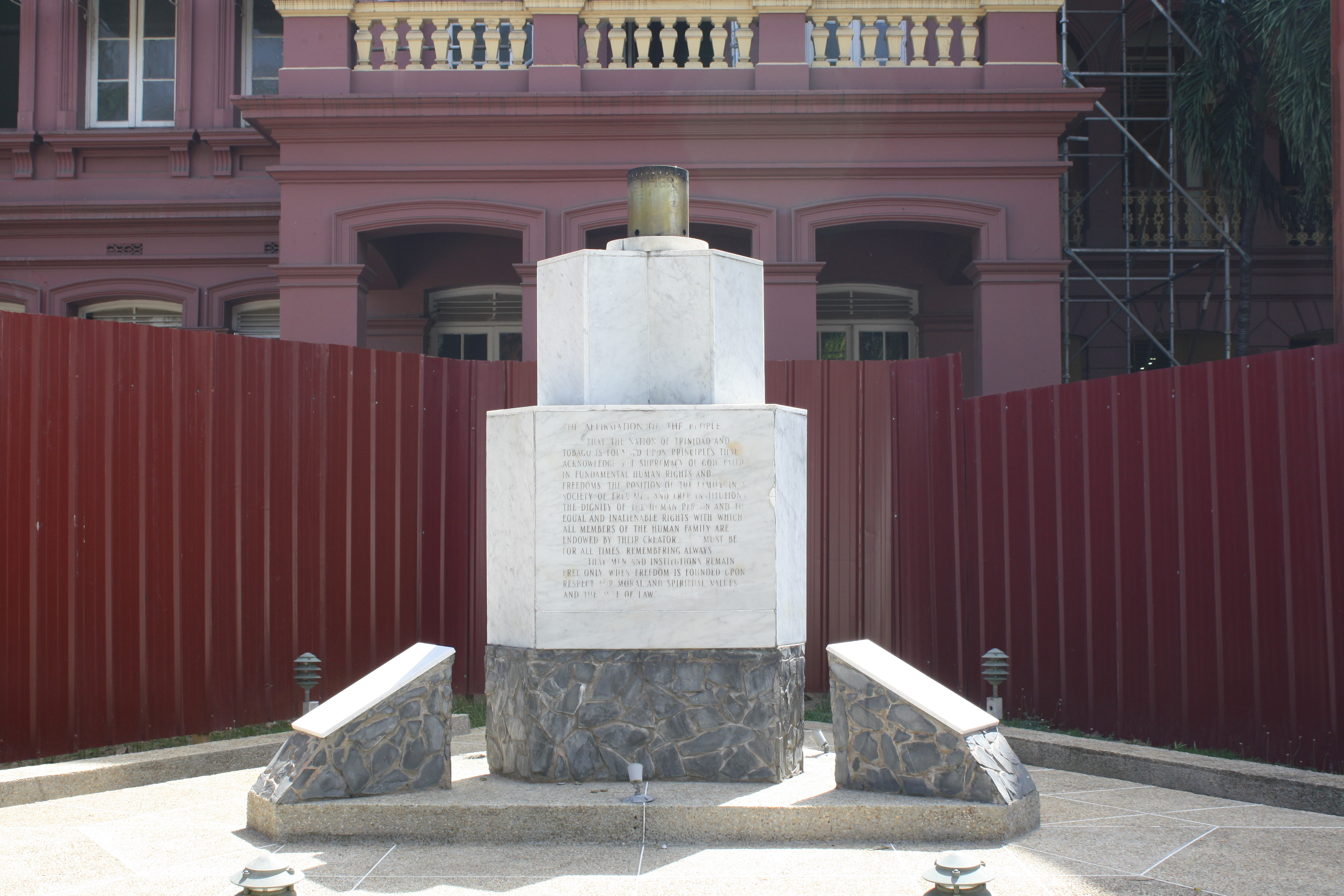
- Eternal flame and 1990 Coup Attempt Memorial, the Red House, Port of Spain, Trinidad and Tobago
Date	27 July – 1 August 1990
Location	Trinidad and Tobago
Result	Government victory (coup suppression, 24 people dead including some insurrectionists, millions of dollars in property damage and losses)

Belligerents
Republic of Trinidad and Tobago; Government of Trinidad and Tobago; Defence Forces; Police Service	Jamaat al Muslimeen

Commanders and leaders
A. N. R. Robinson (Prime Minister); Winston Chandarbhan Dookeran (acting Prime Minister and Minister of Planning and Mobilization); Noor Mohamed Hassanali (President); Joseph Emmanuel Carter (acting President and Senate President); Col. Ralph Brown (Chief of Defence Staff); Jules Bernard (Commissioner of Police); Leonard Taylor (acting Commissioner of Police); Selwyn Richardson (Minister of National Security); Nizam Mohammed (House Speaker); Patrick Manning (Leader of the Opposition)	Yasin Abu Bakr; Bilaal Abdullah
- 24 killed

The Jamaat al Muslimeen coup attempt was an attempt to overthrow the government of Trinidad and Tobago, instigated on Friday, 27 July 1990. Over the course of six days, Jamaat al Muslimeen, a radical extremist Islamist group led by Yasin Abu Bakr, held hostages (including Prime Minister A. N. R. Robinson and other government officials) at the Red House and at the headquarters of the state-owned national television broadcaster, Trinidad and Tobago Television (TTT). On 1 August, the insurgents surrendered. They were charged with treason, but were ordered released by the Court of Appeal. Twenty-four people were killed and many more were injured in the coup attempt.

== Background ==
=== Conflict over No. 1 Mucurapo Road. ===
The Jamaat al Muslimeen was founded in 1982 by Yasin Abu Bakr, a former policeman and converted to Islam, and established a compound at No. 1 Mucurapo Road in Port of Spain, on land owned by the Port of Spain City Corporation. In 1969, the property was granted to the Islamic Missionaries Guild (IMG) by the government of Trinidad and Tobago, but the transfer had never completed because the land belonged to the city, not the central government. In 1984, a court ordered the Muslimeen to vacate the property and demolish the buildings they had constructed without planning permission, including an incomplete mosque. Abu Bakr refused to comply and served a 21-day jail sentence for contempt of court in 1985.

=== Anti-drug campaign ===
In the mid-1980s the Muslimeen launched a vigilante campaign against the illegal drug trade. Muslimeen members drove drug dealers out of "drug blocks" and seized cocaine, marijuana and weapons. They organised their members into a paramilitary force and used their reputation to recruit more members, especially among the disaffected Afro-Trinidadian youth of Port of Spain.

=== Political and economic climate ===
After winning the general elections in December 1986, the National Alliance for Reconstruction (NAR) government implemented policies to deal with an economic decline triggered by a combination of declining petroleum production and falling oil prices. The unemployment rate had risen from a low of 10% in 1981 to a high of 22% in 1986. The NAR government implemented a programme of spending cuts, tax increases and devalued the Trinidad and Tobago dollar in an attempt to reverse the country's economic decline. Cost of living adjustments (COLA) to public servants were suspended in 1987 and their salaries were cut by 10% in 1990. A value-added tax (VAT) was also introduced in the 1990 budget.

Dissent within the ruling party led to a split within the NAR government. Four former members of the United Labour Front who were expelled from Cabinet formed the Caucus for Love, Unity and Brotherhood (CLUB 88) in March 1988, and went on to form a new party, the United National Congress, on 16 March 1988.

In response to the government's economic austerity programmes, trade unions organised a one-day strike on 6 March 1989, and a March Against Hunger on 22 April. On 8 February 1990, a group of 16 trade unions and a variety of civil society organisations including the Jamaat al Muslimeen formed the Summit of People's Organisations (SOPO). In the eight weeks preceding the coup attempt, nurses had engaged in ongoing street protests in Port of Spain.

The government's Social Welfare Department and the public hospitals lacked the resources to handle the increase in demands for their services. The Muslimeen stepped in, offering food, eyeglass frames, and organising medical and dental appointments. For the unemployed and homeless, especially young men, they provided structure and belonging.

=== Escalation ===
In July 1985, former bank Auditor General and one of Abu Bakr's chief lieutenants Abdul Kareem was murdered by an unknown assailant while in police custody. It was later ruled by the Court of Appeal that the officers involved concealed the identity of the killer suspected to be a member of the Police. With the case remaining unsolved, it is widely believed that this event was the genesis of the conflict between the Jamaat and the State.

In 1988, police raided the Jamaat al Muslimeen commune, seizing weapons and ammunition and arresting 34 members. The members were charged with larceny, robbery, illegal possession of weapons, rape and murder. This event led members of Jamaat al Muslimeen to believe that the government was being oppressive and had illegally occupied their land. Before the coup d'état attempt, Abu Bakr was arrested several times on charges of contempt of court and illegal demonstrations.

According to a 2014 interview by former minister of communications Gerald Hadeed, two days before the coup attempt, Prime Minister Robinson was warned that there might be an attempt to overthrow his government on that day and he was asked to have the scheduled sitting postponed. Robinson declined, however, claiming that he had taken an oath of office and he would not deviate from it in front of a potential threat.

== Coup d'état attempt ==
On Friday 27 July 1990 the Jamaat al Muslimeen attempted to stage a coup d'état against the government of Trinidad and Tobago. Their first act was the bombing of the Police Headquarters at around 5:50 pm which by nightfall was completely gutted by fire. Almost simultaneously, forty-two insurgents led by Bilaal Abdullah stormed the Red House, the seat of Parliament, and took Robinson and most of his cabinet hostage, while seventy-two of their accomplices led by Yasin Abu Bakr attacked the offices of Trinidad and Tobago Television (TTT), the only television station in the country at that time. The National Broadcasting Service (NBS Radio 610AM) and the Trinidad Broadcasting Company – Radio Trinidad 730AM, the only two radio stations in the country, were also attacked. At 6.20 pm, Yasin Abu Bakr first appeared on television and announced that the government had been overthrown and that he was negotiating with the army. He called for calm and said that there should be no looting.

Prime Minister Robinson was beaten, degraded and shot in the lower right leg when he tried to order the army to attack the militants. The army and the police responded by sealing off the area around the Red House. Widespread looting and arson took place in Port of Spain and other parts of the East–West Corridor, but the remainder of the country was calm. American Airlines and British Airways cancelled all flights to the capital city. A state of emergency was declared by acting president Emmanuel Carter at 9:00 am on Saturday 28th.

Several cabinet members who had not been present in the Red House at the time of the attack set up office in the Trinidad Hilton. After four broadcasts by the Jamaat, the army on the night of 27 July took control of the TTT transmitters on Cumberland Hill and Gran Couva, thus taking TTT off the air. The establishment of an alternative broadcast facility initially at Cumberland Hill and then Camp Ogden allowed members of the government and the army to disseminate official broadcasts to the public. The takeover by the Jamaat of Radio Trinidad 730AM which was adjacent to TTT failed, and the station was secured by the army. The firebombing of NBS Radio 610AM also failed, and it remained on air during the ordeal. On the night of 27 July, the Jamaat were isolated by the army at both Red House and TTT locations with no access to radio and television for propaganda. After six days of negotiations with an amnesty agreement in place, the Jamaat al Muslimeen surrendered on 1 August and were taken into custody.

== Aftermath ==
The Jamaat al Muslimeen members who surrendered were tried for treason, but the Court of Appeal upheld the amnesty offered to secure their surrender, and they were released. The Judicial Committee of the Privy Council later invalidated the amnesty, but they were not re-arrested.

About 24 people died during the coup attempt, with millions of Trinidad and Tobago dollars in property losses. Among the dead was the Member of Parliament for Diego Martin Central, Leo Des Vignes. Many people saw the coup attempt as the end of the power of the National Alliance for Reconstruction government.

In the aftermath of the 11 September attacks in the United States, Trinidad and Tobago police raided three mosques but no weapons were found. On 22 September, Abu Bakr was detained and questioned for two hours at London's Heathrow Airport while en route to an Islamic conference in Libya. Trinidadian police accused the group of receiving money and training from Libya and Sudan. In the same year, Florida police uncovered a plot to smuggle 60 rifles and 10 submachine guns to the Jamaat in Trinidad.

In late July or early August 2010, the court ruled that many properties owned by the Jamaat would be sold to make up for the cost of the destruction of buildings in the coup attempt. A Commission of Enquiry was appointed to enquire into the events surrounding the attempted coup was formally launched in 2010. On 13 March 2014, the final report was presented to President Anthony Carmona.

The Enquiry found that the proximate cause of the attempted coup was the inadequate communication by Special Branch of the Police Service to inform national security with two years of intelligence that an insurrection by the Jamaat against the Republic was likely. Those within national security who did receive the intelligence either underestimated or discounted the threat which prevented counter-measures. The Enquiry also noted that losses due to arson and looting during the coup was estimated to be TTD $450,000,000.00.

== Books and media ==
Five documentaries were made with respect to the attempted coup:

1. Trinidad Coup 1990 (1990): A post-mortem of the insurrection featured in the series CaribScope produced by the Caribbean Broadcasting Union.
2. Kaiso For 27 July (1991): A 22-minute documentary discussing the aftermath one year later.
3. Caught by Surprise - 1990 Ten Years Later (2000): A four part series produced by CCN TV6 on the 10th anniversary reviewing detailed events.
4. SIEGE (2008): A 28-minute documentary recounting the terror and courage of employees at TTT.
5. 1990 (2009): A 23-minute documentary produced by CCN TV6 reviewing the events and testimonies of some of the hostages.

Five books have been written about the attempted coup:

1. The Muslimeen Grab for Power: Race, Religion, and Revolution in Trinidad and Tobago by political scientist Selwyn Ryan.
2. A Society Under Siege: A Study of Political Confusion and Legal Mysticism by criminologist Professor Ramesh Deosaran documenting the background, culmination and immediate aftermath of the attempted coup.
3. Days of Wrath: The 1990 Coup in Trinidad and Tobago by journalist Raoul Pantin, gives an account of his experience as one of the hostages at TTT.
4. 1990: The Personal Account of a Journalist Under Siege by journalist Dennis McComie who had the humanitarian task to inform the public throughout the ordeal via the lone functioning radio station – NBS Radio 610AM/100FM.
5. Attack with Full Force by retired Brigadier General Ancil Wayne Antoine documenting his experiences during and after the attempted coup as a major in the Trinidad & Tobago Regiment.

On May 30, 2014, Vice News interviewed Yasin Abu Bakr on his role in the attempted coup.
