= National Broadcasting Network =

National Broadcasting Network may refer to:

- National Broadcasting Network (Lebanon), the official television of the Lebanese Amal Movement
- National Broadcasting Network (Trinidad and Tobago)
- People's Television Network, formerly National Broadcasting Network (Philippines)

== See also ==
- National Broadband Network, an Australian open-access data network
