= WIN TV =

WIN TV may refer to:

- Win Sports, a Colombian sports television network
- WIN Television, an Australian regional television network
  - WIN (TV station), the flagship station of WIN Television
- WIN TV (Trinidad and Tobago), a former television station in Trinidad and Tobago
- WinTV, a product range produced by Hauppauge Computer Works

== See also ==
- WINK-TV
- WINP-TV
