= WBU (disambiguation) =

WBU is the World Boxing Union, a boxing sanctioning body.

WBU may also refer to:

== Organisations ==
- World Blind Union, an organization representing the blind or partially sighted
- Welsh Badminton Union, the national governing body for badminton in Wales, now renamed Badminton Wales
- Welsh Baseball Union, the national governing body of British baseball in Wales
- World Broadcasting Unions

== Other uses ==
- Boulder Municipal Airport (IATA code), US
- Wayland Baptist University, US
