= One Caribbean Media =

Holding company in Trinidad and Tobago

One Caribbean Media Limited (OCM)
- Type: Private
- Traded as: TTSE: OCM BSE: OCM
- Industry: Media
- Headquarters: Port of Spain, Trinidad and Tobago
- Area served: Trinidad and Tobago; Barbados; Grenada; St. Lucia
- Key people: Faarees Hosein chairman Dawn Thomas CEO; Karlene Ng Tang CFO & Company Secretary
- Products: Newspapers, Radio Stations, Broadcasting
- Services: Printing, Media Buying, Video Production and Editing
- Revenue: ▼TT$301.17 million (2024); TT$317.99 million (2023)
- Total assets: ▼TT$794.16 million (2024); TT$897.62 million (2023)
- Number of employees: 724
- Divisions: Newspapers; Television; Radio; Internet; New Media
- Subsidiaries: The Caribbean Communications Network (CCN) Group (Trinidad and Tobago); The Nation Corporation Group (Barbados)
- Website: ocmgroup.co/t

One Caribbean Media Limited (OCM) is a Trinidadian and Tobagonian multinational conglomerate headquartered at the Express House in Port of Spain, Trinidad and Tobago. The new company was founded in December 2005, following the merger of the Caribbean Communications Network (CCN) of Trinidad and Tobago, and the Nation Corporation of Barbados. The merger of the respective conglomerates was pursued after both companies held a sizable financial stake in each other for a number of years.

The company currently holds a large financial stake in both the Jamaica Observer, Jamaica's daily newspaper, and Guyana's Stabroek News.

The current chairman is Faarees Hosein, with the chief executive officer being Dawn Thomas, and the Chief Financial Officer & Company Secretary being Karlene Ng Tang. The Trinidad Guardian reported that OCM's revenue for 2024 was TT$301.17 million and total assets as TT$794.16 million. The National Investment Fund (NIF), a government own company, owns 23% shares in OCM.

== Philanthropy ==
Since 2011, the company has sponsored the annual OCM Bocas Prize for Caribbean Literature.

== Subsidiaries ==
The Caribbean Communications Network (CCN) Group (Trinidad and Tobago)

=== Newspaper ===
- The Trinidad Express Newspaper

=== Television ===
- CCN TV6
- Grenada Broadcasting Network (60%)
  - GBN Television

=== Radio ===
- One Caribbean Media (60%)
  - Klassic Radio
  - Sun FM
  - Hott 93

=== ISPs ===
- Green Dot Limited Trinidad and Tobago

=== New Media ===
- Internet Express
- CCN TV6

The Nation Corporation Group (Barbados)

=== Newspapers ===
- The Nation Newspaper

=== Radio ===
- Starcom Network Inc.
  - HOTT 95.3 FM
  - Voice of Barbados (790 VOB)
  - 104 Radio
  - Life 97.5 FM

=== New Media ===
- One Caribbean Media
- NationNews
- Hott 95.3FM
- VOB
- Love FM
- Life FM

== CCCL ==
- Hott 93.5FM (Trinidad)
- The Wave 93.7/94.5FM (St. Lucia)
- The Caribbean Super Station (CSS) (Antigua, Barbuda, British Virgin Islands, Grenada, Montserrat, St. Lucia, St. Kitts, Nevis and Trinidad)

== Citadel Group ==
- i95.5 FM TT
- RED 96.7FM
- Hitz107.1FM

== See also ==
- Guardian Media Limited
- TTT Limited
- Caribbean Media Corporation
