= WEFM =

WEFM may refer to:

- WEFM (FM), a radio station (95.9 FM) licensed to Michigan City, Indiana, United States
- WEFM (Trinidad and Tobago), a radio station (96.1 FM) in the country of Trinidad and Tobago
- The former call sign of the Chicago, Illinois FM radio station now broadcasting as WUSN
