= Colleen Holder =

TV news presenter and producer in Trinidad and Tobago

- Born: Trinidad and Tobago
- Education: University of the West Indies, Mona; BA in Mass Communication (1997)
- Occupations: News presenter, producer
- Years active: 1997–present
- Employer: Office of the Parliament (since 2014)
- Known for: First Up (CNMG), Let's Talk Tobago, CCN TV6 anchor

Colleen Holder was a television news presenter and producer in the Republic of Trinidad and Tobago.

Holder graduated with a Bachelor of Arts Degree in Mass Communication with a major in Radio Production from the University of the West Indies, Mona, Jamaica, in 1997. She worked in the newsroom of Music Radio 97 for four years before moving to Tobago in 2002 to head the newsroom of Tobago Channel 5. She then moved back to Trinidad in July 2003 to become part of the news team at CCN TV6.

She anchored the flagship 7pm and 10pm news broadcasts for four years before resigning from TV6 in 2007.

Holder was noticeably absent from the media for almost two years. In April 2009, she resurfaced on the state-owned television station CNMG, where she anchored the station's coverage of the Fifth Summit of the Americas. She was seen as the primary news anchor of the station's flagship morning programme, First Up, also serving as the station's weekend anchor and producer. In 2010, Holder resigned from the station in protest of the unjust dismissal of one of her First Up colleagues, frontline presenter, Fazeer Mohammed.

Holder went to the Division of Infrastructure and Public Utilities in the Tobago House of Assembly in 2012 as a Communications Specialist where she also presented the THA's flagship programme Let's Talk Tobago, then was recruited to the post of Director, Corporate Communications and Productions at the Office of the Parliament in 2014, a post she still holds.
