= Carla Foderingham =

Carla Foderingham is a former television news presenter in the Republic of Trinidad and Tobago. She is a former anchorwoman at CCN TV6, Gayelle - The Channel and Cable News Channel 3. She is also a former CEO of the Film Company of Trinidad and Tobago.

Carla began her television career in 1996 at CCN TV6 where she presented the morning news, alongside Julian Rogers. She then served as weekend anchor for the station, moving to the primary anchor desk in 1998 after the death of then anchor, Vaughn Salandy. When Gayelle - The Channel signed on in 2004, Carla fronted the station's major 7.00pm newscast. She was also a frontline presenter when Cable News Channel 3 launched in 2005. Carla juggled her anchor slot with her job at the Trinidad and Tobago Film Company for several years, but is now pursuing that responsibility full-time.
