= Jones P. Madeira =

Trinidadian journalist (1944 or 1945 – 2025)

Jones P. Madeira (1944 or 1945 – 10 January 2025) was a Trinidadian journalist. He was editor-in-chief of the Trinidad and Tobago Guardian, from which position he was dismissed after prime minister Basdeo Panday accused him of bias in coverage of the November 1995 general election. Madeira died after a lengthy illness on 10 January 2025, at the age of 80.
