= Sangeet 106.1 FM =

Radio station in Trinidad and Tobago

Sangeet 106.1FM

Port of Spain; Trinidad and Tobago
- Broadcast area: Trinidad and Tobago
- Frequency: 106.1 MHz

Programming
- Language: English
- Format: East Indian
- Affiliations: CNC3, Trinidad and Tobago Guardian

Ownership
- Owner: TBC Radio Network; (Guardian Media Limited)
- Sister stations: 95 The Ultimate One, Sky 99.5, Slam 100.5, The Vibe CT 105.1 FM, Freedom 106.5, Mix 90.1FM

History
- First air date: September 24, 1995

Technical information
- Transmitter coordinates: 10°23′35″N 61°21′44″W

Links
- Webcast: Listen Live
- Website: http://www.sangeet106fm.co.tt/

Sangeet 106.1FM (106.1 FM) is a radio station Broadcasting from Trinidad and Tobago owned and operated by The TBC Radio Network. It was formerly known as Prime 106.1FM broadcasting Pop format.
