= Andina (news agency) =

Peruvian news agency

- Industry: News agency
- Founded: 1981
- Founder: Peruvian government
- Headquarters: Lima, Peru
- Area served: Worldwide
- Website: andina.pe

Andina is a news agency owned by the Peruvian government, covering Latin America and the world at large. It was founded in 1981, and its current editor-in-chief is Félix Paz Quiroz.

== History ==
Andina was founded on June 12, 1981, during the second presidency of Fernando Belaúnde Terry. It is an official state outlet of the Peruvian government, part of the group Editora Perú, which also publishes the daily newspaper El Peruano. The two outlets were briefly combined in 2001, before Alejandro Toledo's government reestablished Andina as a separate news agency the following year, under the leadership of the journalist Gerardo Barraza.

The agency, which has correspondents in every province of the country, sends more than 90 dispatches a day, on average, to 69 radio stations, 40 local and national newspapers, and four international news agencies. It also contributes relevant news bulletins to Bolivian outlets.

Since 2012, Andina has been a member of the Latin American Union of News Agencies.

== See also ==
- Andina de Televisión
- Media of Peru
