= 95 The Ultimate One =

Radio station in Trinidad and Tobago

Port of Spain; Trinidad and Tobago
- Frequency: 95.1 MHz

Programming
- Format: Pop, Rock, R&B, Soca and Variety
- Affiliations: CNC3, Trinidad and Tobago Guardian

Ownership
- Owner: TBC Radio Network; (Guardian Media Limited)
- Sister stations: Sky 99.5, Slam 100.5, The Vibe CT 105.1 FM, Sangeet 106.1 FM, Freedom 106.5, Mix 90.1FM

History
- First air date: March 14, 1976
- Former names: 95.1FM; Rhythm Radio 951; 951 The Rock (1999–2001); 951 The Best Mix (2001–2017); 951 Remix (2017–2022)

Technical information
- ERP: 100,000 watts
- Transmitter coordinates: 10°41′50.9″N 61°32′19.3″W

Links
- Website: tbcradionetwork.co.tt/95theultimateone/

95 The Ultimate One (95.1 FM) is a radio station broadcasting from Trinidad and Tobago owned and operated by Guardian Media Limited. It is currently the oldest station in Trinidad and Tobago. The station rebranded from "951 The Best Mix" to "951 Remix" on November 27, 2017, and then to "95 The Ultimate One" on March 28, 2022.

== See also ==
- Hott 93
- Star 947
- Guardian Media Limited
- Rick Dees Weekly Top 40
- The TBC Radio Network
- CNC3
- Trinidad and Tobago Guardian

Previous 951 Remix Logo
