= The Nation Barbados =

Barbadian newspaper

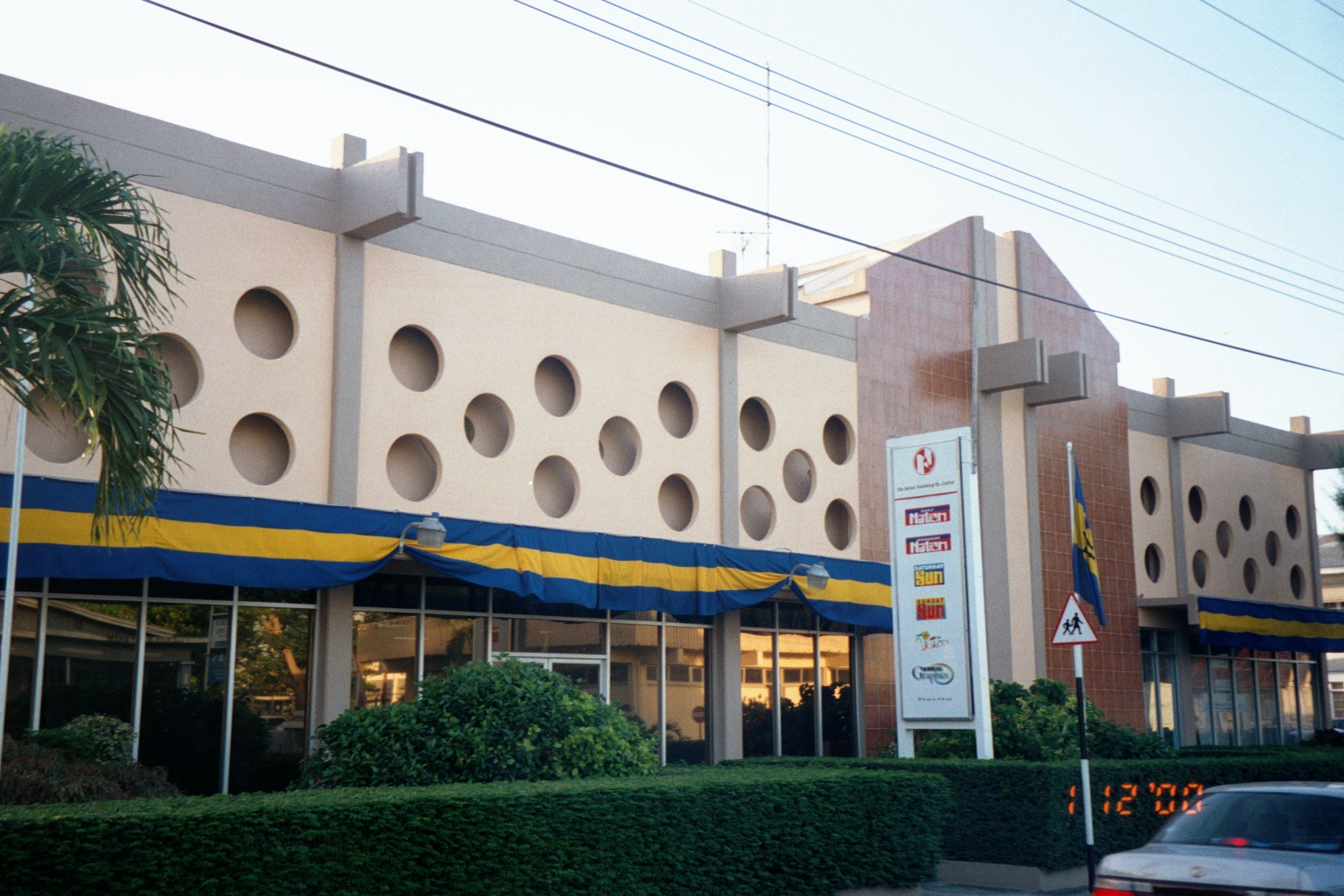
The Nation newspaper building in Fontabelle, Saint Michael, Barbados (2000).

The Nation Publishing Co. Limited is the publisher of the Nation Newspaper, which is the dominant daily newspaper in the country of Barbados. Co-founded by Harold Hoyte and Fred Gollop, it was first established in 1973. the Daily Nation is printed daily in colour and distributed at many points around the country. Covering the topics of business, sports, politics, lifestyles, editorials and entertainment, the Daily Nation reports many aspects of news in Barbados, in addition to regional, and International news.

The name of the publications vary according to different weekdays. Mondays, Tuesdays and Thursdays, it is the Daily Nation. Wednesdays it is the Midweek Nation and Fridays the Weekend Nation. On weekends the newspaper is the Saturday Sun and Sunday Sun respectively. The Nation Publishing Company also publishes a weekly youth magazine called Attitude and a visitors' booklet called Explore Barbados.

In 2004, a weekly Canadian print version was created, as a joint venture with the Carib-Cana Media Inc. (CCMI), to service a growing clientele in Canada for weekly news from Barbados. The Canadian version was mainly for the expatriate community of Barbados, and others living in Canada to remain up to date on Barbadian current events.

The parent company of the Nation Publishing Company is One Caribbean Media Limited (OCM) based in the country of Trinidad and Tobago.

== See also ==
- Media in Barbados
- Barbadian companies
