= Bad Granny =

- Genre: Docu-Series
- Developed by: Stephanie Pemberton & Jason Reece
- Directed by: Stephanie Pemberton
- Presented by: Jason Reece
- Countries of origin: Trinidad and Tobago
- Original language: English
- No. of seasons: 4
- No. of episodes: 52

Production
- Running time: 24minutes

Original release
- Network: CCN TV6 (Episode 1); CNC3 (2013–present)
- Release: May 25, 2013 – present

Bad Granny was a vehicle modification TV show, which was hosted by Jason Reece in Trinidad and Tobago.

The first season was 13 episodes each 30 minutes long, and aired once weekly. The show had four seasons.

The TV-show developed into Bad Granny Media, an advertising agency founded by Pemberton and Reece.
