= Hott 93 =

Radio station in Trinidad and Tobago

- Port of Spain; Trinidad and Tobago
- Frequency: 93.5 MHz

Programming
- Language: English
- Format: Pop, Rock, R&B, Soca and Variety
- Affiliations: TV 6, Caribbean Communications Network

Ownership
- Owner: One Caribbean Media
- Sister stations: Taj 92.3, I95.5, Red 96.7, W 107.1 FM

Links
- Webcast: Listen Live
- Website: http://www.hott93.com

Hott 93 (93.5 FM) is a radio station broadcasting from Trinidad and Tobago, broadcasting a Top 40/CHR format. Licensed to Port of Spain, it serves most areas of the country.

The station's sister stations are: Taj 92.3, i95.5, Red 96.7, and W 107.1.

Logo used until 2015

As of June 29, 2025, at 6:10 PM, the latest song that was played is Only Girl (In The World) by Rihanna.

== See also ==
- 95 The Ultimate One
- Star 947
