= Grenada Broadcasting Network =

National broadcaster of Grenada

- Type: National broadcaster
- Country: Grenada
- TV stations: 7, 11, 20
- Radio stations: 98.5, 98.7 (Hott FM); 105.5, 105.9 (Klassic FM); 96.9, 97.1 (GBN Gospel)
- Headquarters: St. George's
- Owner: One Caribbean Media (60%); Government of Grenada (40%)
- Official website: gbn.gd

The Grenada Broadcasting Network (GBN) is the national broadcaster of the Caribbean island nation of Grenada. It operates three radio stations (Klassic Radio, Hott FM and GBN Gospel) and one television channel (GBN Television).

== History ==
Grenada was first served by radio in 1955, with the establishment of the West Indies Broadcasting Service (WIBS), which covered St. Lucia, St. Vincent, Dominica and Grenada. WIBS was dissolved in 1971 and Radio Grenada was established on 1 January 1972. Grenada Television Co. Ltd. was incorporated on 27 May 1974. In its early years, most of its programs were relayed from Trinidad and Tobago Television. The station had limited advertising revenue, causing limited receiver sales, as Grenada Television was given a monopoly to import television sets.

In 1981, Television Free Grenada took over the existing television station. The channel only broadcast from 6pm to 10pm on Wednesdays and Sundays and had a limited coverage area. In 1982–83, plans were underway to install relay stations to cover all three islands, as well as planning to join the Soviet Intersputnik system and finding arrangements with the Soviet news agency TASS. In November 1989, a public-private joint acquired the other television station on the island, Discovery Television (channel 11), making it a part of Grenada Television.

The company was formerly entirely government-owned and was known as the Grenada Broadcasting Corporation (GBC). It was formed in July 1990 from the merger of two separate government bodies, Radio Grenada and Grenada Television, following the passing of the Grenada Broadcasting Act of December 1989. The first chairman of the new corporation was George Grant, who was formerly the general manager of Radio Grenada and later Television Grenada. As of 1991, it operated one radio station (Radio Grenada) and one television channel (Television Grenada, operating on two VHF frequencies in the NTSC standard).

15% of its equity was sold in 1996, followed by an additional 50% in 1997. In 1998, the Caribbean Communications Network acquired 60% of GBC, renaming it as GBN. The government continued to hold a 40% stake in the broadcaster. The new company was initially profitable, but in 2000, it started suffering a crisis driven by industrial action in mid-2000.
