= WIN TV (Trinidad and Tobago) =

Former television channel in Trinidad and Tobago

World Indian Network Television
- Country: Trinidad and Tobago
- Broadcast area: National
- Affiliates: WIN Radio 101.1FM
- Headquarters: Corner of Henry and Bonito Street, Chaguanas, Trinidad and Tobago

Programming
- Language: English

Ownership
- Owner: WIN Communication Network
- Key people: Mohan Jaikaran; Sunil Ramdeen

History
- Launched: 1 May 2007; 19 years ago
- Closed: 16 June 2016; 10 years ago

Links
- Website: http://www.wintvworld.com

Availability

Terrestrial
- 37 and 39

Streaming media
- JW Player: http://wintvworld.com/

World Indian Network Television (commonly known as WIN TV) was a television station in Trinidad and Tobago. Launched in 2007, it was one of two local television stations (the other being ieTV) dedicated to the Indo-Trinidadian and Tobagonian market. Its headquarters were located at the corner of Henry and Bonito Street, Chaguanas, Trinidad and Tobago.

== History ==
WIN TV was founded by media personality and entrepreneur, Mohan Jaikaran with company shareholdings held by Neil Seepersad and The Tsidkenu Investment Corporation. The station was launched on 14 July 2006 at the Trinidad Hilton where it began broadcasting on 1 May 2007 on Channel 37 on the UHF band and Cable Channel 12 on the Flow Trinidad cable service. In January 2011, the station secured VHF Channel 7 (Trinidad) and UHF Channel 39 (Tobago). An alliance with Tempo Networks saw WIN TV programming being broadcast throughout the Caribbean, while the station itself carried into Canada on Bell Fibe TV and Rogers Cable as WIN Caribbean

WIN offered Indian movies, local events and original programming such as Sunrise, Mid-Morning Live, Medical Matters, Market to Market, the BUZZ weekly, Bollywood Countdown, Big Rich Lime, Point of Focus, Community News, Eyewitness News, The War Room, Rapid Fire, Eye On Crime, Eye on Legal and Crime Watch.

=== Closure ===
The Telecommunications Authority of Trinidad and Tobago (TATT) found WIN TV in violation of the country's Telecommunications Act by not paying outstanding fees and arrears. Troubles increased when the station's founder, Mohan Jaikaran, died on 12 April 2015. It was found that the non-transferable broadcasting licence was not awarded to WIN TV but to Jaikaran, who accumulated fees and arrears since 2011. Subsequent to his death, the Jaikaran family took over operations at the station, and negotiated with TATT for a new license which was denied. Renewal will only be considered if the arrears were cleared where failure to pay will result in the station forced to discontinue operations. Court action was brought by WIN TV against TATT hoping to force a temporary extension of the license as it was set to expire on 29 February 2016. On 26 February, the court rejected WIN TV's application, giving TATT the clearance for "cease & desist" operations. On a televised address, members of the Jaikaran family appealed to the public for financial support towards WIN TV's operations. Although negotiations between WIN TV and TATT continued, financial woes increased resulting in downsizing of staff and the station broadcasting reruns. With most of the debt still being unpaid, WIN TV and its associated radio station WIN Radio 101.1FM were ordered by TATT to cease and desist operations on 14 June 2016.

Currently, only WIN Radio 101.FM is operating via internet live stream under Win Radio Livestream.

== See also ==
- Crime Watch
