= June Gonsalves =

Trinidad and Tobago radio broadcaster (c.1927–2018)

Dame June Gonsalves (c.1927-2018), DSG, was a radio broadcaster in Trinidad and Tobago for many years. She was an announcer on Radio Trinidad, where she started in 1956 and was programme director there from 1964 to 1970. Prior to joining the staff at Radio Trinidad, she hosted the 'Catholic Forum of the Air', a Catholic religious programme, on Sunday afternoons at 12.45. It was while doing that programme that she came to the attention of the Radio Trinidad management.

She died at her home in Anderson Terrace, Maraval, at 6.45 p.m. on Friday, 10 August 2018, aged 91, after battling Alzheimer's disease for the previous seven years.

She was the widow of national football goalkeeper Joey Gonsalves who died on 30 September 2010. They were married for more than 60 years.

Gonsalves was the first female programme director of a radio station in Trinidad and the West Indies. She moved on to Trinidad and Tobago Television as a TV newscaster in the early 1970s. She also worked as the secretary to the late Roman Catholic archbishop of Port-of-Spain, Anthony Pantin, until his death in 2000.

In 2000, she became the first woman in Trinidad and Tobago to be named a Dame Commander of the Order of St Gregory the Great in the Roman Catholic Church.
