= Slam 100.5 =

Radio station in Trinidad and Tobago

Port of Spain; Trinidad and Tobago
- Frequency: 100.5 MHz (HD Radio)

Programming
- Language: English
- Format: Urban, soca, dancehall
- Affiliations: CNC3, Trinidad and Tobago Guardian

Ownership
- Owner: TBC Radio Network; (Guardian Media Limited)
- Sister stations: 95 The Ultimate One, Sky 99.5, The Vibe CT 105.1 FM, Sangeet 106.1 FM, Freedom 106.5, Mix 90.1FM

History
- First air date: April 10, 2011

Technical information
- ERP: 100,000 watts (Predicted)
- HAAT: 94.4 m (300 ft)
- Transmitter coordinates: 10°41′50.9″N 61°32′19.3″W

Links
- Webcast: Listen Live
- Website: http://www.slam1005.com/

Slam 100.5 is a radio station in Trinidad and Tobago.
