= Surujpat Mathura =

Surujpat "Pat" Mathura, (1923 – 9 August 2007) was the longest serving radio broadcaster in Trinidad.

== Biography ==
Surujpat Mathura, the son of Chandar Bahadoor Mathura and Rookmin, was working in his father's printery when he decided to embark upon a career in journalism and radio announcing.

With the encouragement of his father, he started in 1947 at Radio Trinidad, where he worked for 47 years as an announcer, as well as producing radio programmes, with special emphasis on Indian art, culture and religion.

Mathura's primary education started at St. Theresa's Private school at De Verteuil St., Woodbrook. The principal, Mr. Cherry, saw him as an asset to the school and from very early he prepared him to meet the challenges of being a student. After leaving Woodbrook C.M. School he entered Tranquility Boys Intermediate where McDonald Bailey, the principal, again gave him special training. He transferred to St. Mary's College, where he became a member of the fifth Trinidad Sea Scouts Troupe, of which he remained a lifelong member.

At the height of World War II, he graduated from St. Mary's College and took up a job at the American base at Cumuto where he worked for two years before deciding to join his father's printery in Port of Spain. At that time the main function of Band R Printing Service was the production of a magazine called The Indian. While there, Mathura decided to embark on a career as a radio announcer.

He joined Radio Trinidad where, in the beginning, he had to purchase time and sell commercials to cover the cost of his programme, which was an important first focus on Indian culture on the subcontinent and around Trinidad. He remained at the radio station from 1947 until April 1994, when he moved FM 103, the country's first station completely dedicated to Indian programming.

In the 1956 Trinidad and Tobago general election he fought for the seat of Tunapuna and lost to Learie Constantine.

He was the longest-serving radio broadcaster in Trinidad, and was also the youngest mayor of Trinidad's capital city, Port-of-Spain. He was a widely respected radio personality in Trinidad and Tobago. He was affectionately referred to as Uncle Pat, and hosted a show called Vintage Favourites Masala Radio. Upon his death, he was recognized by the National Council for Indian Culture (NCIC) and the Hindi Nidhi Foundation of Trinidad and Tobago. Mathura died on August 9, 2007, at age 84.
