= National Broadcasting Network (Trinidad and Tobago) =

Former state-owned broadcaster of Trinidad and Tobago

The National Broadcasting Network (NBN), formerly National Broadcasting Service of Trinidad and Tobago (or just National Broadcasting Service, abbreviated to NBS) and International Communications Network (ICN), was a state-owned broadcasting station in the Republic of Trinidad and Tobago between November 1969 and January 2005.

== Early days ==
The precursor to the National Broadcasting Service (NBS Radio) was Radio Guardian, established on October 13, 1957, by the Thompson Group, the British owners of the Trinidad Guardian newspaper. On November 1, 1969, the Government under Eric Williams acquired Radio Guardian and Trinidad and Tobago Television (TTT). Radio Guardian was nationalised and renamed the National Broadcasting Service of Trinidad and Tobago (NBS Radio 610), although continued to be referred to by its old name. The radio broadcast and production studios continued to be located at 17 Abercromby Street in downtown Port-of-Spain, the capital city.

On October 6, 1972, the National Broadcasting Service became the first media company in Trinidad & Tobago to operate an FM stereo station, Radio 100 FM, which remained the sole FM stereo signal available until the privately owned Trinidad Broadcasting Company (Radio Trinidad) opened Radio 95 FM Stereo on March 14, 1976.

Over the days of the attempted coup attempt led by the Jamaat al-Muslimeen on July 27, 1990, NBS Radio remained on the air around the clock as the only source of information for listeners in the country, up the eastern Caribbean and also overseas via short-wave signal.

== International Communications Network ==
In 1995, with the addition of Radio 98.9 FM, catering largely to the urban youth, the National Broadcasting Service (i.e. the radio frequencies) were relocated to the TTT compound at 11A Maraval Road in Port of Spain. Yet a further frequency came on board shortly thereafter - 91.1 FM. This frequency was for a while also used to rebroadcast NBS Radio 610 AM as an FM signal. Under the re-branded International Communications Network (ICN), 91.1 FM eventually changed its format entirely to East Indian programming in 1998. Radio 610 continued to broadcast on the AM dial, but progressively lost its traditional listening audience due to a weakening of the quality of its broadcast signal and a reduction in allocated financial resources to upgrade its equipment and programming.

== National Broadcasting Network ==
In 2001 there was another name change, with ICN rebranded as the National Broadcasting Network (NBN). Due to financial losses, both radio and TV broadcast entities of NBN ceased operations at midnight on January 15, 2005.

In early 2007, a newly created state-owned media company began operations under the name of the Caribbean New Media Group, as the successor to Trinidad and Tobago Television.

== See also ==
- Radio in Trinidad and Tobago
