= C TV =

Television station in Trinidad and Tobago

C Television (C TV)
- The C Television logo at time of closure
- Country: Trinidad and Tobago
- Broadcast area: National
- Network: Caribbean New Media Group
- Affiliates: 91.1 Talk City, Sweet 100.1, Next FM 99.1.
- Headquarters: 11 A Maraval Road, Port of Spain, Trinidad and Tobago

Programming
- Language: English
- Picture format: 480i (SDTV)

Ownership
- Owner: The Caribbean New Media Group Limited (CNMG)
- Key people: Ingrid Issac

History
- Replaced: TTT
- Former names: Trinidad & Tobago Television (ttt)

Links
- Website: http://www.ctntworld.com/

Availability

Terrestrial
- 9 and 13

Streaming media
- BitGravity: http://ctvtt.com/stream.htm

C Television (C TV) was the flagship television station of the Caribbean New Media Group, a state-owned media company in Trinidad and Tobago that was formed in 2005 as the successor company to Trinidad and Tobago Television (TTT). Until August 2018, C TV operated from studios at 11 A Maraval Road, Port of Spain, Trinidad and Tobago. The station boasted that its facilities were the most technologically advanced of its kind in the Caribbean region at the time of launch. The station was replaced by a rebranded TTT in August 2018.

== History ==
The Caribbean New Media Group was formed in 2005 after the financial demise of its predecessor, the National Broadcasting Network (NBN), the parent company of the flagship television station, Trinidad & Tobago Television (TTT). The studios, located on Maraval Road, Port of Spain, were refurbished where the station commenced operations on June 5, 2006. During the initial test period, programming consisted of a four-hour block from 6.00 to 10.00p.m.

The formal launch of the Caribbean New Media Group occurred in mid-2007 and the station was re-branded from CNMG Television to C. In 2011, the station was then rebranded to CTV.

In August 2017, Minister Maxie Cuffie announced that CNMG would be wound up and replaced by TTT Limited. The rebranded TTT station was launched on August 30, 2018.

== Programming ==
C TV's programming line-up included local and foreign content. The station gained popularity with its broadcast of the Miss World Pageant annually, Digicel Rising Stars programme and the coverage of the 2007 ICC Cricket World Cup. C TV's foreign line-up included popular US television series such as Pretty Little Liars, Hawaii Five-0, Hellcats, The Cleveland Show, The Doctors, The Simpsons, Grimm (TV series), Blue Bloods (TV series), Law & Order: Special Victims Unit, House (TV series), Motive (TV series), NCIS, NCIS: Los Angeles and Vampire Diaries among others.

== News and current affairs ==
CTV would broadcast four and a half hours of news programming on weekdays and thirty minutes of news programming on weekends. The station's breakfast programme First Up, was one of the highest rated programmes in the country. "First Up" was simulcast on its sister radio station Talk City 91.1. CTV also carried an hour-long newscast at 7.00pm and news updates carried at 6pm, 9pm and 10pm. There was also a thirty-minute newscast at noon. All newscasts were available on demand on the station's website.

== Controversy ==
On November 8, 2010, outspoken First Up presenter Fazeer Mohammed was replaced by GISL Chief Executive Officer Andy Johnson. The incident led many commentators to speculate that it was politically motivated, stemming from an interview between Mohammed and Minister of Foreign Affairs, Suruj Rambajhan. The Media Association of Trinidad and Tobago condemned the action. The incident also caused a massive public outcry on the station's social networking sites.

== Coverage ==
CTV broadcast on VHF channels 9 and 13 on the island of Trinidad and channel UHF 20 on the island of Tobago. The station was also transmitted on all of the country's major cable systems on the following channels:

- Flow (National): Ch. 6 (Digital) Ch. 106 (Advanced Video Service)
- Massy Communications (National): Ch. 105
- Digicel Play: Ch. 7
- Trico (Tobago): Ch. 2
- RVR International (Rio Claro): Ch. 9
- Mayaro Cable: Ch. 9
- Diamond Vale Cable: Ch. 13

CTV was also available on national platforms Blink (IPTV) and Green Dot (Satellite).

== Anchors and presenters ==
- Samantha John - C News At 7
- James Saunders - C News At 7 (sports)
- Ean Wallace - C News At 7 (weather)
- StacyAnn Providence - C News At Noon
- Paul Richards - Good Morning T&T
- Jessie May Ventour - Good Morning T&T

== Radio ==
C TV was available to listen live on Talk City 91.1 FM.
