= Latin American Union of News Agencies =

Alliance of news agencies

The Latin American Union of News Agencies (Spanish: Unión Latinoamericana de Noticias), or ULAN, is an alliance of news agencies based in Latin America. It was formed in Caracas, Venezuela, in 2011.

== Members ==
As of 2014, the ULAN consists of nine members:

- Agência Brasil
- ABI
- Prensa Latina
- ANDES
- Notimex
- Andina
- Agencia Venezolana de Noticias
- Latin America News Agency
- Secretariat of Communications (Uruguay)

== See also ==
- Caribbean Media Corporation (CMC)
- Union of South American Nations
