= Caribbean News Agency =

The Caribbean News Agency (CANA) was founded in 1975 as successor to the former Reuters Caribbean service, created by the Caribbean region's print and broadcast media outlets. Stake-holding media companies share their own local content with CANA which in turn would have access to other media houses' stories and articles. Using this method enabled editors in the region to have their news shared in other neighbouring countries within the Caribbean region.

On June 9, 2000, the commercial operations of CANA were merged with the Caribbean Broadcasting Union (CBU) to form the Caribbean Media Corporation (CMC), based in Barbados. CANA and CBU remain the sole joint owners of CMC, not-for-profit corporation.

== See also ==
- List of news agencies
