= Shelly Dass =

Trinidad and Tobago television personality

Shelly Dass-Manning
- Born: Shelly Dass; Trinidad
- Occupations: Journalist & Media executive

Shelly Dass (now possibly Dass Manning) is an international and government relations strategy advisor. She has worked with public and private partners on energy and development projects across the Americas. She has served as a senior political advisor in Washington, D.C to the Organization of American States working with 34 member states and 64 observer countries, partner agencies and special interest groups. Shelly Dass started her career as a journalist, television news anchor and current affairs producer and has been recognized for her work in media through multiple local, regional and international awards.

Dass worked as the highest rated television news presenter in Trinidad and Tobago through May 2010. She was anchor of the nightly newscast on Cable News Channel 3.

== Childhood and early career ==
Dass was born and raised in the private oil community of Pointe-a-Pierre, south Trinidad. Her father was a senior employee of Texaco, Trintoc, and state-owned Petrotrin for many years. She was educated at St Peters' Private Primary School in Pointe-a-Pierre, St. Joseph's Convent, and later, Oral Roberts University in the United States, where she studied broadcast journalism. She has been accredited by MIT in AI Negotiation, Stanford University in Communication, the London School of Economics and Political Science in Risk and Crisis Management and pursued an LLB with the University of London.

== Anchorwoman ==
Dass was a news anchor at both CCN TV6 (where she started in September 1998) and Trinidad and Tobago Television, prior to her stint at Cable News Channel 3. She was a co-presenter of Morning Edition and later the anchor of the News At Ten on TV6, and the CCN TV6 news at 7, before moving to the anchor chair at TTT's Panorama. She briefly returned to TV6 in 2005, before joining CNC3. She was also the producer and moderator of the current affairs programme The Big Story on CNC3. With Dass as both producer and host, the show won 4 awards for analysis and coverage and picked up international acclaim just three months into its airing. Dass left for Washington DC to serve as a senior Advisor to the OAS, and then returned to Trinidad & Tobago in 2015. Dass was head hunted to be the moderator of the Prime Minister's Debate between then Prime Minister, Kamla Persad-Bissessar and then Opposition Leader, Dr. Keith Rowley. This debate however, never happened. In 2015, Dass returned to CNC3 to anchor the station's 10 year anniversary newscast along with other former anchors Odeka O'Neil Seaton and Roger Sant. She would stay with the company and be promoted to Group Head of News of the Guardian Media Limited, parent company of CNC3 taking up responsibility for all news and editorial content of CNC3, the Guardian newspaper, 6 associated radio stations and multiple online news platforms. The platforms are all owned by the Ansa McAL Group.

== Personal life ==
On December 12, 2020, Dass wed Brian Manning MP, a Trinidadian and Tobagonian politician, in a small, intimate wedding at Stollmeyer's Castle, in Port of Spain, Trinidad. Manning is the son of former Prime Minister of Trinidad and Tobago, the late Patrick Manning, and former education minister Hazel Manning.

Dass was previously married to Robert Clarke, a producer and reporter in a million dollar beachfront ceremony at a private family owned resort in Tobago. Clarke is the great great grandson of Captain Arthur Andrew Cipriani, former Trinidad & Tobago politician, mayor, and trade union leader. Clarke, a journalist and writer, met Dass during a cabinet press conference in Port of Spain. The couple is divorced and share one child together.
