= Radio Turks and Caicos =

Radio station in Turks and Caicos Islands

Radio Turks and Caicos (RCT98FM) is a public radio station broadcasting to the British Overseas Territory of Turks and Caicos Islands. It is owned by the Government of the Turks and Caicos Islands.

== History ==
Radio Turks and Caicos was founded by Cable and Wireless.
