= SVG-TV =

Saint Vincent and the Grenadines
- Channels: Digital: 9

Ownership
- Owner: SVGBC

History
- Founded: March 2, 1980

Links
- Website: http://watchsvgtv.com

SVG-TV is the national television station of Saint Vincent and the Grenadines, owned by SVGBC. The station's main transmitter broadcasts on channel 9, with several other low-powered relay stations (7, 10, 11, 13 and 14).

== History ==
SVG-TV started broadcasting on March 2, 1980. In the mid-1980s it took part in a six-island project financed by IPDC.

Unlike its competitors, SVG-TV is the only channel that broadcasts its signal over-the-air. By the early 2000s, the channel was affiliated to CBS, as well as having agreements with CNN and the Barbadian Caribbean Media Corporation. Main programmes at the time included the news, Jamz TV produced by sister radio station Hitz FM, Take Two, Sportweek and Inside Out. Key foreign programmes were Sunset+Vine's Gillette World Sport and the CBS newsmagazine 60 Minutes, aired live on Sundays in place of the 7pm news. Most of the local programmes disappeared by the late 2000s, with only The Evening News and Sportweek surviving. Business Round Table replaced the slot left out by 60 Minutes.

As of 2011, SVG-TV employed a staff of 40, having increased its local output, and with hopes that the broadcaster would reach the levels of the BBC and CNN. For Emancipation Month that year (August) it introduced Chronicles of the Community: beyond the surface, about the facets of life in the country. In 2013, it was carrying the Caribbean Professional League, for which it had paid a sum between US$3,000 and 5,000 without sponsorship agreements.

Since Saint Vincent and the Grenadines is one of the few countries in the world that recognize Taiwan as the legitimate Chinese government, SVG-TV has routinely received foreign support from Taiwan. On January 17, 2019, SVG-TV signed an agreement to air the Taiwanese drama series The New World, produced by Taiwan Television.
