= Radio Trinidad =

Former radio station in Trinidad and Tobago

- Port of Spain; Trinidad and Tobago
- Broadcast area: Trinidad and Tobago
- Frequency: 730 kHz

Programming
- Language: English
- Format: Religious

Ownership
- Owner: Guardian Media Limited
- Sister stations: TBC Radio Network

History
- First air date: 1947
- Last air date: April 5, 2015

Radio Trinidad was the oldest radio station in Trinidad and Tobago. It began broadcasting in 1947 at 11B Maraval Road in Port of Spain on the frequency 730 AM.

Over the years, the station successfully hosted a wide variety of programmes including soap operas, local and international news, educational documentaries such as the School Broadcasting Unit's show, which aired around 10a.m. on Mondays to Fridays when school was in session, and The Passing Parade hosted by John Doremus.

The station's announcers included June Gonsalves, Barbara Assoon, Glen Antoine, Sam Ghany, Val Douglas, Russell Winston, Trevor McDonald, Errol Chevalier, David Evelyn, Patrick Mathura, Peter Minshall, Don Proudfoot, Bob Gittens and Ashton Chambers.

Two of the most popular programmes were:

- Sunday Serenade, a show that featured performers of the day including the Mighty Sparrow and Ken Hutcheon), broadcast at 11.00 a.m. on Sundays and hosted by Sam Ghany.
- Auntie Kay, a children's talent show named after its presenter Kathleen Davis, which ran on Sundays at 2 p.m. and was sponsored by the Bermudez Biscuit Company. The back-up band was Choy Aming and the featured pianists were Aldwyn Albino and Dawlett Ahee.

Among other regular features were the Cook Caribbean Jazz programme (which took its name from a Trinidad recording company, Cook Caribbean, that originally produced 78 rpm records and later continued with the 33 1/3 format), and The Indian Hour at 6 p.m. every day. There was also a programme for children called I'll Tell You A Story with Auntie Wendy (Wendy Price), and a classical music show entitled Music of the Masters.

Radio Trinidad covered the many events linked with the thoroughbred horse breeding fostered by Trinidad and Tobago: horse races at the Queen's Park Savannah, in Port of Spain, at the Arima Race Track, at Union Park in San Fernando and at Shirvan Park on Tobago, and aired live commentary on races in Barbados. The main race and sporting commentator was Ralph Ellis Knowles, better known as Raffie Knowles, who was Head of Sports at the station for years. (When television came to Trinidad on Independence Day in 1962, he moonlighted there as Trinidad and Tobago Television's main sportscaster. Raffie's photographic memory enabled him to work without benefit of script or teleprompter, providing detailed scores, giving historical data and anecdotes on players and teams on a whole variety of sports and sporting personalities.)

A sister station at 95 FM was officially launched on Sunday March 14, 1976; prior to that, 95 FM merely broadcast the same programming as Radio Trinidad.

The Radio Trinidad 730 AM frequency was dedicated to inspirational music and other church and religious broadcasting.

Radio Trinidad ceased broadcasting on the AM band on Easter Day, April 5, 2015. The format (inspirational music and Christian broadcasting) of the AM frequency has now been vested in a new station, operating at 99.5 FM. Like the old Radio Trinidad, the FM stations are currently located at the Guardian building in Port of Spain named Sky 99.5

== Sources ==
- Sky's the limit. Retrieved 13 April 2015
