= Multi Technology Vision =

- Country: Guyana
- Broadcast area: National
- Headquarters: Georgetown

Programming
- Language(s): English
- Picture format: 480i (NTSC and ATSC)

History
- Launched: 1997

Links
- Website: https://mtvgy.com

Availability

Terrestrial
- UHF: Channel 14

Multi Technology Vision (MTV) is a Guyanese commercial television station founded in 1997. The channel broadcasts over-the-air on UHF channel 14 and on channel 65 on cable.

== History ==
In February 2008, MTV condemned violent attacks in Lusignan and Bartica, aiming to hold a telethon for family members of the victims.

The channel gained a license from the NFMU in October 2013. In August 2014, Martin Goolsarran, formerly of NCN Television, joined MTV as a managing director.

On August 31, 2017, MTV's transmitter was knocked down, under suspicions of sabotage. As a consequence of the act, MTV suspended all programs until further notice. Broadcasts resumed on September 9, but at a limited capacity due to problems in sourcing the equipment. The transmitter was set to restore to its previous capacity by the end of the month.
