= Star 947 =

Radio station in Trinidad and Tobago

STAR 947

Port of Spain; Trinidad and Tobago
- Frequency: 94.7 MHz (HD Radio)

Programming
- Format: Pop, Rock, R&B, Soca and Variety

Ownership
- Owner: Trinidad and Tobago Radio Network
- Sister stations: 96WEFM, 107.7 FM Music for Life

Links
- Webcast: Listen Live
- Website: Official Website

Star 947 (94.7 FM) is a radio station broadcasting from Port of Spain, Trinidad and Tobago. It is a member of Trinidad and Tobago's Radio Network (TTRN) and has been broadcasting since 2010.

== News ==
The radio station provides news, through Newsfeed bulletins throughout the weekday. Along with 96 WEFM and 107.7 FM Music For Life, short news summaries are provided roughly hourly on the half-hour during the daytime hours between 6:30 am and 6:30 pm.

== See also ==
- 95 The Ultimate One
- Hott 93
