= 96WEFM =

Radio station in Trinidad and Tobago

Port of Spain; Trinidad and Tobago
- Frequency: 96.1 MHz

Programming
- Format: Soca, Urban

Ownership
- Owner: Trinidad & Tobago Radio Network Limited
- Sister stations: Star 947, 107.7FM Music for Life

History
- First air date: December 16, 1993

Links
- Webcast: Listen Live
- Website: 96WEFM's Website

96WEFM is an FM radio station broadcasting on 96.1 MHz in the country of Trinidad and Tobago. The commercial radio station is privately owned by Trinidad and Tobago Radio Network Limited and began broadcasting on December 16, 1993.

The radio station's format is based on Urban Caribbean (soca, dancehall), R&B and hip-hop music, and seeks an audience bases of youth and teenagers.

DJ groups from WEFM have revolutionized the art of DJing in the country, with present and former DJs such as Rodney King, Ishmael, Dawg E. Slaughter & X-Caliber, Hoppy (Hypa-Hoppa) of RadioActive, Shal Marshall & Barry Perryman (Jugglers Sound), Akil and associate degree, Tweez, Arelon the ArtMan, Trevlyn and Umba D' Sheppard.

Additionally, morning show hosts Paul Richards and Nicky Crosby and Rachel Price and Tweez - The price is right are renowned for their quick wit, sense of humor and their level of fairness towards all issues. One of the nations highest-rated radio time slots belongs to Stephenson "Shal" Marshall.

== News ==
The radio station provides news, through Newsfeed bulletins throughout the weekday. Along with STAR 947 and 107.7 FM Music For Life, short news summaries are provided roughly hourly on the half-hour during the daytime hours.

== See also ==
- Radio in Trinidad and Tobago
- Slam 100.5
