= Gayelle =

Trinidad and Tobago cable television station

Gayelle The Caribbean (GayelleTV)
- Alternate Gayelle logo
- Country: Trinidad and Tobago
- Broadcast area: Trinidad and Tobago
- Headquarters: 13 Southern Main Road, Curepe, Trinidad and Tobago

Programming
- Language: English

Ownership
- Owner: Errol Fabien
- Key people: Christopher Laird; Errol Fabien

History
- Launched: 16 February 2004

Links
- Website: https://www.facebook.com/GayelleTheCaribbean/

Availability

Streaming media
- Ustream.tv: https://tegotv.com/livetv/864

Gayelle Television (Gayelle) is a privately owned television station, serving Trinidad and Tobago. The television station broadcasts on UHF channel 23 to the city of Port of Spain and has recently started broadcasting to Central Trinidad on UHF channel 27. It is available on the Flow Trinidad cable system as channel 7 and also on cable systems in Tobago and Grenada. The station offers 100% local and Caribbean programming, and much of its programming consists of live talk-shows. The station's studio is located at 13 Southern Main Road, Curepe, Trinidad and Tobago.

== News ==
Gayelle TV carried a weeknight news-hour at 7pm, anchored by Paolo Kernahan and a thirty-minute equivalent on weekends, anchored by Adonis Ballah. The station also carries hourly news updates on weekdays from 6am to 6pm. Gayelle News is known for its focus of community features such as We The People and Community Connection.On March 31, 2009, the station closed its news department and laid off 16 members of staff due to the global economic downturn. As of April 1, 2009, the station entered into an agreement with CNC3 Television to simulcast the CNC3 7pm newscast.

== Network Slogans ==
- At last we own television! (16 February 2004 – 19 January 2010, currently used on website)
- Haiti We Have Your Back (19 January – 9 February 2010)
- Long Live Gayelle (19 February – 1 April 2010)
- Change is Here...Keep Watch- All Fools Day (1 – 9 April 2010)
- celebrating our community, celebrating six years together (10 June – 16 August 2010)
- a space for us all (18 April – 24 October 2011)
