= Radio Montserrat =

- Montserrat
- Frequency: 95.5 FM

Programming
- Language: English

Ownership
- Owner: Government of Montserrat

History
- First air date: 1952

Links
- Website: https://www.zjbradio.com/

Radio Montserrat, known by the callsign ZJB, is a Montserratian public radio station broadcasting to the British Overseas Territory of Montserrat. The station broadcasts from studios in the Davy Hill area of the island. The station broadcasts a mixture of music, news and religious programming with some content provided by the BBC World Service.

== History ==
Radio Montserrat was launched in 1952 by Frank Delisle. Initially it was a privately owned venture although it was nationalised in 1957. Originally broadcast from Olveston the station moved to the capital Plymouth at the same time.

After the eruption of the Soufrière Hills volcano in 1995 the station was forced to abandon its studios on Lovers Lane Plymouth and relocate to the safer northern part of the island.

== Studios ==
Radio Montserrat was formerly broadcast from a temporary studio complex in the Sweeney's area of the island. The station now broadcasts from their new studio in the Davy Hill area of the island.

== Transmitter ==
Radio Montserrat is broadcast from the Silver Hill transmitter at the very north of the island.

== ZTV ==
In 2011, ZJB started television broadcasts under the name ZTV, delivering video coverage of news and events.
