= Caribbean Media Corporation =

The Caribbean Media Corporation (CMC) is a Barbados-based centralised content-provider for the various Caribbean media houses in the region. Formed in June 2000, through the merger of the Caribbean Broadcasting Union (CBU) and the Caribbean News Agency (CANA). The Caribbean Media Corporation mainly serves as a regional clearinghouse of regional news and information in the countries of CARIFORUM. In addition to the CMC's regional media stake-holders, the CMC also caters to several International associate media organisations.

Operationally the CMC organisation is predominantly funded through contributions of the regional media houses involved. However, in 2004, the Government of Barbados provided a home for the CMC with the creation of the Caribbean Media Centre in a government-owned office complex on an industrial estate. The centre's rent-free status was to end in 2007.

== See also ==
- Comparison of feed aggregators
- Caribbean Broadcasting Union
- Caribbean News Agency
- CaribVision
- Latin American Union of News Agencies
- PanaPress
