= Trinidad Express Newspapers =

Daily newspaper in Trinidad and Tobago

Trinidad and Tobago Express

- Trinidad Express cover on 6 March 2015
- Type: Daily newspaper
- Owner: Caribbean Communications Network
- Founded: 6 June 1967; 58 years ago
- Headquarters: 35 Independence Square, Port of Spain, Trinidad
- Website: www.trinidadexpress.com

The Trinidad and Tobago Express, better known as Daily Express (and the weekend editions Saturday Express and Sunday Express), is one of three daily newspapers in Trinidad and Tobago. The Daily Express as per its masthead is published by the Caribbean Communications Network (CCN) and is headquartered on Independence Square in Port of Spain. The newspaper commenced operations on 6 June 1967. The website for the Trinidad and Tobago Express was first registered in 1997 and launched subsequently very soon thereafter. The Express newspaper is the second-oldest of the daily Trinidad and Tobago newspapers.

== Online presence ==
The Trinidad and Tobago Express news website, then known as the Internet Express, grew quickly into one of the top visited websites about Trinidad and Tobago. With up to 10,000 hits per day, the website has become one of the online centrepieces of CCN. Originally online as express.co.tt in 1996, it later acquired the address trinidadexpress.com roughly one year later. In 2002, newscasts of the television channel CCN TV6, and its televised daily polls, were carried out using an integrated website of the Trinidad and Tobago Express. That same year, the joint staff of the Trinidad and Tobago website also created an e-commerce venture online called the Express MarketPlace, which was later renamed CaribBuy in 2003. In order to remain focused, a CCN New Ventures division was created within CCN to take control of the various websites.

== History ==
Raoul Pantin, a former journalist and editor for the Trinidad Express, authored a book, The Trinidad Express Story which chronicles the history and establishment of the newspaper.

In 1986 the Express helped launch the Stabroek News, the first independent, general circulation newspaper in Guyana.
