= North American Broadcasters Association =

Nonprofit broadcasting organization

- Headquarters: Canadian Broadcasting Centre
- Location: Toronto, Ontario, Canada
- Affiliations: World Broadcasting Unions
- Website: www.nabanet.com

The North American Broadcasters Association (NABA) is a non-profit group of broadcasting organizations in the United States, Canada and Mexico. It is "committed to advancing the interests of broadcasters at home and internationally."

As a member of the World Broadcasting Unions, NABA "creates the opportunity for North American broadcasters to share information, identify common interests and reach consensus on international issues." NABA also provides representation for North American broadcasters in global forums on topics including protection of content, spectrum related concerns, the territorial integrity of broadcasters’ signals and digital transition issues.

NABA's full members, who represent network broadcasters both public and private, work together with their colleagues including national broadcasting associations, speciality services, service providers and vendors to provide a common voice for the North American broadcast community.

== NABA annual general meeting (AGM) and conference ==
Each year, NABA holds a conference and annual general meeting (AGM). This event provides members with the opportunity to gather in one place to discuss important issues in official meetings and through conference panels. NABA members host each event at their facilities, with the most recent AGMs taking place at CNN (Atlanta), Fox (Los Angeles), CBC/Radio-Canada (Toronto), NBC-Universal (New York), Televisa/TV Azteca (and Grupo Salinas) (Mexico City) and NPR (Washington, DC).

== Full members ==
- Amazon
- AMC Global Media
- Bell Media
- Canadian Broadcasting Corporation/Société Radio-Canada
- Charter Communications
- E. W. Scripps Company
- Fox Corporation
- Hearst Communications
- Lionsgate
- NBCUniversal (a subsidiary of Comcast)
- Skydance
- Sony Corporation of America (a subsidiary of Sony Group Corporation)
- Starz Entertainment
- Televisa
- TelevisaUnivision
- The Walt Disney Company

== Associate members ==
- Corus Entertainment
- Imagen Televisión
- NAB
- National Association of Television Program Executives
- Nexstar Media Group
- NPR
- PBS
- Sinclair Broadcast Group
- Tegna Inc.

== Affiliated & Telecommunication members ==
- Ad-ID
- AT&T
- Dolby Laboratories, Inc.
- Dish Network
- Eutelsat
- Google
- Grupo Vazol
- iHeartMedia
- Imagine Communications
- IMAX Corporation
- Intelsat
- Microsoft
- Netflix, Inc.
- News Corp
- Omnicom Group
- Pearl TV
- Ross Video
- Saban Capital Group
- Samsung
- Scholastic Corporation
- Sesame Workshop
- SES
- SiriusXM
- T-Mobile US
- Verizon Communications
- WildBrain
- Xperi
