= Trinidad and Tobago Television =

Public television network in Trinidad and Tobago

TTT Limited formerly Trinidad and Tobago Television
- Country: Trinidad and Tobago
- Headquarters: 11 A Maraval Road, Port of Spain, Trinidad and Tobago

Programming
- Language: English
- Picture format: 1080i HDTV

Ownership
- Owner: Government of Trinidad and Tobago (100%)
- Key people: Lord Roy Thompson; Ronald F. Goodsman; Barry Gordon; Mr. Michael Clarke; Jack Elvin; Norman Hartley; Neville Welch

History
- Launched: 24 August 1962; Re-launched on 30 August 2018
- Replaced: C TV

Links
- Website: www.ttt.live/

Availability

Terrestrial
- Analog VHF: Channels 9 and 13

TTT Limited is a state owned national television broadcaster in Trinidad and Tobago with its headquarters located at 11 A Maraval Road, Port of Spain.

The company formerly operated two stations; TTT channels 2 & 13 from 1962 to 2005, and Alternative Television popularly known as TTT Channels 9 & 14 from 1983 to 1990. The station and its parent company, the National Broadcasting Network (NBN) was closed at midnight on 14 January 2005 due to bankruptcy with C TV becoming its successor in 2006. After several years of being off the air, it was found that TTT still had a strong brand identity among the population and a cult following on social media. On 30 August 2018, TTT Limited was re-launched by Prime Minister Keith Rowley at 3:00 PM AST.

== Company information ==
TTT was the state-owned television broadcaster, and the only television operator for over thirty years from 1962 to 1991. TTT showcased the diversity of Trinidad and Tobago's society by featuring exponents of indigenous artistic expression. Today, its main goal is to develop an ecosystem for the distribution of local content that would be relevant to modern Trinidad & Tobago and attractive in the fluid global markets.

== History ==
TTT "It's Yours" rebrand 2001

TTT's logo from 1962 to 2005

Trinidad & Tobago Television was created by Canadian businessman Roy Thomson, then owner of the Thomson Organization. The Trinidad & Tobago Television Company, a partnership by the Thompson Organization (50%), Rediffusion (30%), CBS (10%) and the Government of Trinidad and Tobago (10%) was developed to serve the two islands of Trinidad and Tobago.

On Friday 24 August 1962, Trinidad and Tobago Television was launched one week before the two-island state of Trinidad and Tobago gained independence on 31 August 1962 within the Commonwealth of Nations. It was the first television service to operate in the Commonwealth Caribbean. Mervyn Telfer, a former Radio Trinidad announcer, read the station's first broadcast, the 7.00 p.m. News. The two channels to transmit the service to the new twin island state were channels 2 and 13. News shown during that first week included highlights of Independence Day preparations.

Other former Radio Trinidad personnel who joined TTT were announcers Clyde Alleyne and Hazel Ward (later Hazel Ward-Redman); salesman (later 'Scouting for Talent' host) Holly Betaudier; and technical operators, including Errol Harrylal, Hugh Pierre and Miley Duke.

The first events that were shown on the evening of 30–31 August were the flag raising ceremony and the playing of the national anthem, and the inauguration of television. TTT teamed up with US network CBS to provide technical assistance at launch. In 1963, it broadcast the first televised Trinidad Carnival. The station also employed Admags early on. In the 1970s, some of its programmes were relayed to Grenada via Grenada Television.

In 1986, TTT installed a TVRO dish, relaying mainly American output. By the late 80s, 86% of viewers (650,000 people) watched such content.

== Timeline of events ==
- 24 August 1962: Trinidad and Tobago Television began broadcasting one week ahead of Independence Day on 31 August, with Mervyn Telfer reading the nightly news at 7:00.
- 1 November 1962: TTT was opened formally by Government Minister Dr Patrick Solomon.
- 1 November 1969: Government of Trinidad & Tobago acquired the shares of the Thompson Organization and British Rediffusion making the station a state-owned majority.
- 1977: Colour television was introduced as the station was traditionally black and white.
- 1983: The Trinidad & Tobago Television Company opened a second television station "Alternative Television" popularly known as TTT Channels 9 & 14.
- 27 July 1990: The stations were taken over during the Jamaat al Muslimeen coup attempt. Several employees were held hostage, and the station was used for propaganda by the Jamaat al Muslimeen. The studios of TTT Channels 9 and 14 was destroyed and went off the air permanently after this incident.
- 1991: Cable feeds from news channel CNN was provided occasionally after station sign-off. Other cable feeds such as MOR Music TV, Trinity Broadcasting Network and ARTS was also provided in the latter years.
- 13 March 1994: The Trinidad and Tobago Television Company was merged with the state-owned radio company, the National Broadcasting Service. The new entity was called the International Communications Network.
- February 1997: The Government of Trinidad & Tobago acquired the bankrupt AVM Television (AVM Channels 4&16), which merged with the state-owned International Communications Network (ICN). AVM Television was renamed and relaunched as "The Information Channel".
- 3 September 1999: The International Communications Network was restructured and renamed the National Broadcasting Network (NBN). "TTT It's Yours" re-branding exercise was launched. Archived content from TTT was shifted and later broadcast on The Information Channel.
- 11 January 2005: The new state owned Caribbean New Media Group Ltd (CNMG) was incorporated as the successor of the NBN which was suffering from financial losses.
- 14 January 2005: The NBN was shut down with TTT Channels 2 and 13 ending their transmissions at midnight. The Information Channel, was leased to the National Carnival Commission to become NCC4.
- 5 June 2006: CNMG TV, later renamed C TV was formally launched as the successor to TTT.
- 24 August 2017: The Government of Trinidad & Tobago announced that the state owned CTV will be revamped and revert to its former name TTT in the near future.
- 26 June 2018: A new state board was appointed to execute the transition process. Operations of the reinstated TTT is set to commence in July 2018.
- 25 July 2018: Minister of Communications Stuart Young announced that the new Trinidad and Tobago Television (TTT) is scheduled to launch on 30 August, one day before Independence Day.
- 30 August 2018: TTT Limited is re-launched as a re-branded version of former media group CNMG by Prime Minister of Trinidad and Tobago, The Honourable Dr. Keith Rowley at 3:00 PM AST.
- 18 February 2019: The Filmmakers Collaborative of Trinidad & Tobago (FILMCO) signed a local partnership agreement to showcase locally produced content.

== Programming ==
The previous incarnation of TTT was best known for its local and cultural programming such as Know Your Country, At Home, College Quiz, It's in the News, Time To Talk, Turn of the Tide, Teen Dance Party, Party Time, Play Your Cards Right, Meet The Press, Mainly for Women, Rikki Tikki, Beulah Darling, Calabash Alley, Mastana Bahar, Community Dateline, 12 & Under, Treasured Classics, Forever Classics, Indian Variety, Indian Cultural Magazine, Party Flava by Request, Calypso Showcase, Steelband Concert, Planet Bollywood, Zingray, The Issues Live, Best Village Competition and Scouting For Talent.

The station's flagship news programme, Panorama, remains an icon in Trinidad and Tobago, even as the station has gone off the air. For 29 years it was the nation's only evening news programme, allowing the citizens of Trinidad and Tobago access to television pictures from across the country and around the world.

Alongside the TTT re-launch in 2018, new programming introduced included TTT News, NOW Morning Show, Got Carnival, Video Vibe, Indigenous Bites with Wendy Rahamut, Miss Supranational 2022, and Mister Supranational 2022.

== Personalities ==
Trinidad and Tobago Television launched the careers of several of the most recognized journalists and broadcasters in the Caribbean across two generations which are listed below. With the 2018 relaunch, TTT retains the on-air personalities from its predecessor, C TV.

=== Current staff members ===
- Kimoy Thomas-Williams (C.E.O Ag.)
- Diane Robertson (TV Programming Manager)
- Ayanna Cyrus (Finance and Accounting Manager)
- (Legal Secretary)
- J'son Jackman (Sales & Marketing Manager)
- Tristan Dodson (Production Manager (ag.))
- Dike Rostant
- Khary Roberts
- Ria Roopchandsingh
- Mahalia Joseph-Wharton
- Cherrylene Lewis
- Sunil Lalla
- Terry-Ann Browne-Campbell
- Marie Therese Bernard
- Wayne Cunningham

=== Former staff members ===
- Dominic Kallipersad – now Head News Anchor at CCN TV6
- Francesca Hawkins – now News Anchor at CNC3 Television
- Shelly Dass
- Wendell Constantine
- Hansley Ajodha
- Tony Fraser (Now on Power 102.1fm)
- Debbie Lewis-de Gannes
- Errol Pilgrim
- Sir Trevor McDonald – ITV anchor
- Allyson Hennessy – (deceased)
- Ian Ali (deceased)
- Terrance Greaves – (deceased)
- Horace James (deceased)
- Mervyn Telfer – first News Anchor (deceased)
- Dale Kolasingh (deceased)
- Hazel Ward-Redman – (deceased)
- Holly Betaudier – (deceased)
- Sham Mohammed (deceased)
- Jai Parasram
- Jones P Madeira
- Hans Hanoomansingh
- Anthony Harford
- Robin Maharaj – (Weatherman)
- David Parasram – (Weatherman)
- Michael Clarke
- John Victor
- Paolo Kernahan
- Ashford Jackman
- Clyde Alleyne (deceased, who went on to become the first black television broadcaster in England. He worked for Tyne Tees Television (TTT) there).

Other notable presenters include Peter Minshall, Ann Austin, O'Brian Haynes, Freddie Wharwood (deceased, 1994), Melina Scott (deceased, 2009), June Gonsalves (died 10 August 2018), Errol Chevalier (who died in London, England, on 6 June 2021), David Evelyn (deceased, 1994), Salisha Ali (deceased), Carl Redhead (deceased, 2002), Gideon Hanoomansingh, Mariel Brown, Sharon Coward, Danielle Dieffenthaller, Gary Moreno (now Bermuda Broadcasting Company), Debbie Lewis-DeGannes, Raffie Knowles (deceased), Don Proudfoot (deceased, 1982), Ashton F Chambers (deceased, 2013), Farouk Muhammad, Jose Ramon-Fortune, Lloyd Roehler, Brian Carter, Bobby Thomas (deceased, 2001), Terrance Greaves (deceased), Vaughn Salandy (deceased), Gary Moreno, Josanne Leonard, Afzal Khan, Bernard Pantin.

== Network slogans ==
- Eyes and ears of the nation (1962–1983)
- This is TTT (1984–1998)
- it's yours! (1999–2005)
- Live for Local (2018–present)

== See also ==
- One Caribbean Media
- Guardian Media Limited
- Caribbean New Media Group
- Caribbean Media Corporation
