= Caribbean Communications Network =

CCN logo

The Caribbean Communications Network Ltd. (CCN) also known as the "CCN Group" Ltd., is a subsidiary of ONE Caribbean Media Limited. In December, 2005 both the Trinidad and Tobago–based Caribbean Communications Network (CCN) and the Barbados-based Nation Corporation entered into a merger agreement for formation of the new ONE Caribbean Media Limited company. Following the merger (officially on January 1, 2006), Caribbean Communications Network Ltd. as the larger of two companies continued to hold the aegis of the new dynamic media conglomerate based in Independence Square of Port of Spain, in Trinidad and Tobago. Prior to merger, CCN was ranked as one of the top 50 largest Caribbean companies.

== History ==
The genesis of Caribbean Communication Network (CCN) was the Trinidad Express newspaper. The newspaper was founded in 1967 by a group of journalists who found themselves displaced when the British-owned Daily Mirror was brought out by foreign owners of the rival Guardian newspaper. The local group enlisted the help of a number of their country's leading businessmen and on 6 June 1967 the first paper rolled off the presses. Later, Caribbean Communication Network Group became a holding company for the Trinidad Express and other media properties. The company subsequently acquired significant holdings in a number of Caribbean media houses.

On 31 August 1991 CCN television, channels 6 and 18, became the first independently operated television station in the English-speaking Caribbean, broadcasting to over 80% of Trinidad and Tobago’s population.

On 24 June 1991 CCN become one of eleven radio stations in the country when it began transmission of its own radio station, Prime Radio 106FM. The group later sold 106FM in August 1995.

In 1995 CCN group formed a subsidiary called Galaxy Caribbean, which began cooperation with South American Cisneros Group. After two years, CCN's Galaxy Caribbean began roll-out of DirecTV Caribbean television services to the region. After its launch in Trinidad and Tobago, CCN's Galaxy became the region’s first direct-to-home digital, satellite entertainment service and made Trinidad and Tobago only the fifth country in the world to institute DirecTV service. As CCN Group changed direction it allowed for Cisneros Group to buy Galaxy Caribbean for $9.9 million and to roll DirecTV Caribbean into the wider DirecTV Latin America. That deal was completed on 1 November 2000.

== Business segments ==
The company operates CCN TV6 which is the number one privately owned television station in the Trinidad and Tobago market. CCN also holds an interest in the Grenada Broadcast Network.

The Caribbean Communications Network owns one of the two leading daily newspapers of Trinidad and Tobago, the Trinidad Express.
