= CCN TV6 =

Trinidad and Tobago television station

- Country: Trinidad and Tobago
- Broadcast area: National
- Affiliates: Trinidad Express Newspaper, Hott 93, Taj 92.3, W 107.1, I95.5, Red 96.7
- Headquarters: 35-37 Independence Square, Port of Spain, Trinidad and Tobago

Programming
- Language: English
- Picture format: 1080i (HDTV)

Ownership
- Owner: One Caribbean Media
- Parent: Caribbean Communications Network
- Key people: Richard Purcell; Shida Bolai; Dominic Kalipersad; Sharon Hamilton

Links
- Website: http://www.tv6tnt.com/

Availability

Terrestrial
- OTA Analogue: 6, 18

Streaming media
- Field59: https://www.tv6tnt.com/watch_live/

The Caribbean Communications Network Television 6 (CCN TV6) is a Trinidadian free-to-air television network. It operates an analog NTSC television system, broadcasting on channels 6 and 18 in the island of Trinidad and channel 19 in Tobago. Its studios are located at 35-37 Independence Square, Port of Spain.

== History ==
CCN TV6 began broadcasting on 31 August 1991, with viewing hours from 6:00 a.m. to 10:00 p.m. daily. Before that date, audience choices were limited as the government-owned Trinidad & Tobago Television (ttt) was the only choice. TV6 became the first independently operated television station in the English-speaking Caribbean, broadcasting to over 80% of Trinidad and Tobago’s population. Once TV6 was launched, the television monopoly was broken with the market opening.

TV6 has been the home of several veteran broadcasters in Trinidad and Tobago over the years, including Francesca Hawkins and Dominic Kalipersad.

== Corporate information ==
The station was launched by Caribbean Communications Network, owners of the Trinidad Express, in 1991. By the first half of 2002, TV6 started to solidify its online integration with the flagship Trinidad Express website. CCN TV6 began including much of its nightly newscast online, for customers to access as news-on-demand on the Trinidad Express website. In 2005, CCN merged with the Barbados Nation to form a new company One Caribbean Media Ltd. The General Manager of CCN TV6 is Shida Bolai.

== Programming ==
The station is the top-rated broadcaster in Trinidad and Tobago. Its programme lineup consists of popular local and American television series such as Crime Watch, Grey's Anatomy, Without a Trace, Smallville, Monk, Desperate Housewives and CSI: Crime Scene Investigation, US Daytime soap-operas such as The Bold and the Beautiful and The Young and the Restless, local and regional drama series such as Westwood Park and the Jamaican series Royal Palm Estate and local news. In 2013, TV6 premiered the Bad Granny reality show about cars.

The station also has a long-standing commitment to sport programming and is the official broadcaster of the FIFA World Cup.

On June 3, 2015, TV6 (among other local stations) broadcast a paid program featuring an address by indicted former FIFA and CONCACAF executive and Trinidad native Jack Warner titled Jack Warner: The Gloves are Off, in which he stated that he had documents linking the outcome of the 2010 Trinidad and Tobago general election with FIFA finances and himself and said that his life was in danger, that he had given the documents to lawyers, and that he would "no longer keep secrets for them who actively seek to destroy the country." In response, comedian John Oliver, host of the HBO news-comedy series Last Week Tonight, arranged for his own paid address, John Oliver: The Mittens of Disapproval are On, to air on TV6 on June 9. During the broadcast, Oliver called upon Warner to release the information he said he possessed.

== News ==
The TV6 News runs a full hour and a half from 7:00 pm which also has a radio simulcast of that program on 88.7 FM. The station also ran a half-hour newscast at 10:00 pm anchored by Michelle Awai with Damian Salandy fronting the weather forecast but this was discontinued in 2016. The station was the first to air a lunchtime newscast beginning in 2005 which runs for 15 minutes. The morning current affairs programme Morning Edition features interviews with top newsmakers in Trinidad and Tobago.

The TV6 News is anchored by Desha Rambhajan, James Saunders, and Josette Deonanan. Dominic Kallipersad headed the station's newsroom on two occasions, in the 90's and from 2006 - 2016.

The flagship 7:00 pm broadcast has been ahead in ratings since 1997, making it one of the most watched programmes in Trinidad & Tobago and is also the leader in bringing breaking news from around the country.

== Anchors and presenters ==
=== Former Anchors and presenters ===
- 1991–1993 - Nigel Augustus, Francesca Hawkins and Ira Mathur
- 1993–1995 - Dominic Kalipersad and Francesca Hawkins
- 1995–1997 - Francesca Hawkins
- 1997–1998 - Vaughn Salandy
- 1998–2003 - Carla Foderingham, Roger Sant, Shelly Dass
- 2003–2005 - Nathalie Williams, Colleen Holder Roger Sant Shelly Dass
- 2006–2007 - Colleen Holder, Cherise D'Abadie and Samantha John
- 2007–2008 - Samantha John and Cherise D'Abadie
- 2008–2011 - Samantha John, Fabian Pierre, Diane Baldeo-Chadeesingh, Joel Villafana, James Saunders and Damian Salandy
- 2011–2013 - Samantha John, Faine Richards, Diane Baldeo-Chadeesingh, Phillip Lopez, Gail Rajack, Terrance Clark, Joel Villafana, Michelle Awai and Damian Salandy
- 2013–2014 - Samantha John, Faine Richards, Phillip Lopez, Marlon Hopkinson, Joel Villafana, Michelle Awai and Damian Salandy
- 2014–2019 - Desha Rambhajan, Faine Richards, Phillip Lopez, Marlan Hopkinson, Joel Villafana, Michelle-Ann Awai, and Damian Salandy
- 2019–Present- Desha Rambhajan, James Saunders, Josette Deonanan, Anselm Gibbs, Urvashi Tewari-Roopnarine and Michelle-Ann Awai

=== Current anchors and presenters ===
- Desha Rambhajan - The TV6 News Main Anchor
- Anselm Gibbs - The TV6 News
- Urvashi Tewari-Roopnarine - The TV6 News Anchor
- Dominic Kalipersad - TV6 Weekend News
- Roshel Edwards - TV6 Weather
- Sachin Ramsubhag - TV6 Sport
- Michelle Ann Awai - TV6 Weekend News

Francesca Hawkins served as the station's first primary anchor from its inception to 1997. She was then succeeded by Carla Foderingham who was the second long-serving anchor from 1998–2003, followed by Colleen Holder who anchored between 2003–2007. Samantha John served as the station's last long-serving primary anchor from 2006–2014, a stint spanning a total of eight years bypassing her predecessors but her successor, Desha Rambhajan is the current and longest-serving anchor since 2014 to present, over 10 years.

== Network Slogans ==
- CELEBRATING 20 YEARS OF BROADCAST EXCELLENCE (Thursday September 15, 2011)
- IF IT'S HAPPENIN' IT'S ON 6!
- THE TV6 NEWS - REVEALING FACTS, PROVOKING OPINIONS

== Radio ==
TV 6 is available to listen live on 87.7 FM

Tv6 is also part of the OCM group which includes I95.5fm, Word W107.1fm, HoTT 93.5fm, Red 96.7fm, and TAJ 92.7fm in Trinidad and Tobago.

== Mobile App ==
The CCN TV6 launched its new mobile App on Friday 16 June 2023 (link). The new App is a user-friendly application developed by Caribbean Communications Network (CCN) Group Technology, for mobile devices. The CCN TV6 App offers breaking news, livestreams, originals (Beyond the Tape, Morning Edition, etc.) for users in Trinidad and Tobago and beyond. The CCN TV6 App is available for download free of charge on both iOS (link) and Android (link) platforms.

== See also ==
- CNC3
- TTT Limited
