= TBC Radio Network =

- Company type: Subsidiary
- Industry: Media
- Founded: 1947
- Headquarters: Port of Spain, Trinidad and Tobago
- Number of locations: 2
- Area served: Trinidad and Tobago, Guyana
- Products: Radio Stations, Broadcasting
- Services: Radio
- Parent: Guardian Media Limited
- Website: http://www.tbcradionetwork.co.tt/

The Trinidad Broadcasting Company (TBC) Radio Network is a network of radio stations in Trinidad and Tobago and Guyana owned and operated by Guardian Media Limited. It is headquartered at 22-24 St. Vincent Street, Port of Spain, Trinidad and Tobago, W.I.

== Radio Stations in Trinidad and Tobago ==
- 95 The Ultimate One
- The Vibe CT 105.1 FM
- Sangeet 106.1 FM
- Freedom 106.5
- Slam 100.5
- Sky 99.5

=== Defunct Radio Stations ===
- Radio Trinidad

== Radio Stations in Guyana ==
- Mix 90.1FM
