= Caribbean New Media Group =

- Company type: Public- owned by Government of Trinidad and Tobago
- Founded: 5 June 2006
- Defunct: 30 August, 2018
- Headquarters: 11A Maraval Road, Port of Spain, Trinidad and Tobago
- Area served: Most of Trinidad and Tobago

The Caribbean New Media Group was a state-run media company in Trinidad and Tobago, formed in 2005. It was the successor company to Trinidad and Tobago Television (TTT). In August 2017, Minister Maxie Cuffie announced that CNMG would be wound up and replaced by TTT Limited. The new TTT Limited was launched by Prime Minister Keith Rowley, in August 2018, with the rebranded TTT television station replacing C TV. CNMG's three radio stations — Sweet 100.1, Next 99.1 and Talk City 91.1 — were retained under TTT Limited.
