= CNC3 =

Trinidad and Tobago television station

CNC3 Television (CNC3)
- Current CNC3 logo
- Country: Trinidad and Tobago
- Broadcast area: Nationwide
- Affiliates: Trinidad Guardian, TBC Radio Network
- Headquarters: 22–24 St. Vincent Street, Port of Spain, Trinidad and Tobago

Programming
- Language: English
- Picture format: 480i (SDTV)

Ownership
- Owner: Guardian Media Limited
- Key people: Gergard Pettier (Managing Director); Kaymar Jordan (Managing Editor)

History
- Launched: 26 September 2005
- Former names: Cable News Channel 3

Links
- Website: http://www.cnc3.co.tt/

Availability

Terrestrial
- OTA Analogue: 12, 14 and 22

Streaming media
- Livestream: https://www.cnc3.co.tt/live-stream/
- CNC3 App: Android and iOS

CNC3 Television (CNC3) is a television station privately owned by Guardian Media Limited serving Trinidad and Tobago. It broadcasts over-the-air on channels 12 and 14 and is seen throughout the FLOW cable system on channel 3 (DVS) or 103 (AVS). CNC3's studios are located at the Trinidad Guardian building located on 22–24 St. Vincent Street, Port of Spain, Trinidad and Tobago. It is both a local broadcast partner and affiliate of Al Jazeera and CNN International running simulcasts of both stations throughout the day.

== History ==
The acronym CNC3 originally stood for Cable News Channel 3, as the station was originally a news and current affairs themed channel which was carried on Channel 3 on the Flow national cable service, and the network slogan for CNC3 since 2005 is “Covering your world”. When the station went free-to-air, the name CNC3 was retained, but the focus shifted from exclusively news programming to include general entertainment and movies as well.

CNC3 broadcast begun on 26 September 2005. Approximately three hours prior to the station's debut, the Telecommunications Authority of Trinidad and Tobago (TATT) ordered that CNC3 not proceed with its broadcasts, claiming that the broadcaster had no authority to proceed. TATT reversed its decision late the following day, and broadcasts began shortly thereafter.

In December 2007, CNC3 was recommended by the Telecommunications Authority of Trinidad and Tobago for a national free-to-air broadcast license. The station went free-to-air on 1 November 2008. The station can also be seen on VHF Channel 12, UHF channel 14 and UHF Channel 22 in Tobago.

== Programming ==
When the station was launched there was an implied public perception that it would feature a 24-hour news schedule. Instead, the station carries its major newscasts at the same time as competing broadcast stations, and it carries no news content during the afternoon or overnight periods, and there is only one thirty-minute news broadcast on weekends. Hourly News Updates from 6 am to 7pm are available on Mondays to Fridays on CNC3 and the TBC Radio Network.

As the station went free-to-air in November 2008, the schedule was expanded to add primetime shows such as Nip/Tuck, Top Gear, Everybody Hates Chris, Family Guy, Fringe, Modern Family, Cougar Town, The Unit, George Lopez, America's Got Talent, Accidentally on Purpose and Glee.

In April 2013, Crime Watch hosted by Ian Alleyne, which was formerly broadcast on CCN TV6 and WIN TV, began on CNC3 with a first week of live broadcasts over the country. Also in 2013, CNC3 took over Bad Granny, a reality show about cars.

The station entered into a strategic alliance with Gayelle TV on 1 April 2009 to simulcast its newscast on Gayelle due to Gayelle's closure of its News department. That arrangement concluded in 2010 and later resumed in 2011.

CNC3 broadcast the 2018 FIFA World Cup in HD on Digital Cable platforms and on their website. They were unable to broadcast in HD over the air as they still utilise NTSC to broadcast, which only supports up to 480i.

CNC3 is part of Guardian Media Limited, a Member of the ANSA McAl Group of Companies.

== Anchors and presenters ==
CNC3 boasts a team of experienced anchors and presenters including:

- Ria Rambally – CNC3 Anchor
- Ryan Bachoo – CNC3 Anchor
- Seigonie Mohammed – CNC3 Weather Anchor
- Gyasi Merrique – CNC3 Sport Anchor

Shelly Dass, who was the station's primary anchor since its inception left the station on May 28, 2010 to commence a job as a special advisor to the Organization Of American States and returned in 2015 to anchor the station's 10th anniversary newscast along with Odeka O'neil Seaton and Roger Sant, after which she took up the portfolio of Head of News in 2016. She was later promoted to Head of News of the Guardian Media Company, having editorial control of the company's newspaper together with leading the station's newsroom.

Roger Sant was the former Sport Director, who left the station to commence a job at NGC.

== See also ==
- CCN TV6
- TTT Limited
