= Trinidad and Tobago Guardian =

Daily newspaper in Trinidad and Tobago

Trinidad and Tobago Sunday Guardian
- Front page of the Trinidad and Tobago Guardian (24 March 2020)
- Type: Weekly newspaper
- Format: Tabloid
- Owner: Guardian Media Limited
- Editor: Debra Wanser
- Managing Editor: Kaymar Jordan
- Founded: 1917 (108 years ago)
- Language: English
- Headquarters: 22–24 St. Vincent Street, Port of Spain
- Circulation: 40,000 (2002)
- Website: guardian.co.tt

The Trinidad and Tobago Guardian (together with the Sunday Guardian) is the oldest daily newspaper in Trinidad and Tobago. The paper is considered the newspaper of record for Trinidad and Tobago. The slogan of the paper is The Guardian of Democracy.

The newspaper is owned and published by Guardian Media Limited. The main office of the Guardian is located at St. Vincent Street, Port of Spain.

== Format ==
It began as a broadsheet but in November 2002 changed to tabloid format, known as the "G-sized Guardian". In June 2008, the paper changed to a smaller-size tabloid. On 11 September 2017, the company launched a new layout.

== History ==
Its first edition was published by the Trinidad Publishing Co. on Sunday 2 September 1917. In 1955, according to an advertisement in Editor & Publisher, the Trinidad Publishing Co. operated the Guardian, the Sunday Guardian, and the Evening News.

On 2 September 2017, the Trinidad and Tobago Guardian celebrated its 100th anniversary.

== Staff ==
Debra Wanser has been the editor of the Trinidad and Tobago Sunday Guardian since 2007, and daily news editor since 2001. Kaymar Jordan is the current managing editor of Guardian Media Limited; she started in 2022.

Journalists have included the writer Seepersad Naipaul. A book published by Peepal Tree Press, Seepersad Naipaul, Amazing Scenes: Selected Journalism 1928–1953 covers 25 years of Naipaul's columns and articles in the Guardian. Naipaul was initially charged with reporting on the lives of the "East Indians". The articles often reflect on topical issues of the day but are notable for their humour.

== See also ==
- TBC Radio Network
- CNC3
