= Television in Trinidad and Tobago =

Television in Trinidad and Tobago was introduced in 1962 beginning with Trinidad & Tobago Television. TTT was the sole television station for 29 years being operated by the state until the first independently operated television station, the Caribbean Communications Network, CCN TV6 was launched in 1991 breaking the television monopoly market. In 1992, a second independently operated station, AVM Television was launched. The first independently operated cable station, The Trinity Network (TTN) now Trinity TV began operations in 1993 broadcasting on weekends only.

AVM Television was acquired by the state in 1997 and renamed The Information Channel (TIC) until it was leased by the National Carnival Commission in 2005 and re-branded NCC4. Once the lease ended in 2011, the state began controlling the station once more under the Government Information Services Limited (GISL TV4) until 2017. The station was closed for three years and re-launched as the Education Channel in 2020.

TTT was shut down by the state on 14 January 2005 due to financial difficulties. In its place a new state entity was created, the Caribbean News Media Group (CNMG), where C Television (CTV) began broadcasting in 2006. Since the closure of TTT, new independently operated stations were launched, the most notable being the Cable News Channel 3 or CNC3. After several years of being off the air, it was found that TTT still had a strong brand identity among the population and a cult following on social media. On 30 August 2018, TTT was re-launched replacing CTV.

Broadcast networks in Trinidad and Tobago can be divided into three categories:

- Commercial broadcasting networks (which air English-language programming to a general audience). Example: CNC3
- Educational and other non-commercial broadcasting member stations (which air English- and some foreign-language television programming, intended to be educational television or otherwise of a sort not found on commercial television). Example: The Parliament Channel
- Religious broadcasting networks. Example: TV Jaagriti

== Table of broadcast networks ==
All of the networks listed below air on cable and satellite services.

=== English-language networks ===
Television Network	Founded	Genre/Subject	Terrestrial	FLOW	Amplia	Digicel+	Air Link	Satellite (Green Dot)	Satellite (DirecTV)
ACTS25	15 August 2006	Christianity	25	153	116	10	Yes	Yes	No
CCN TV6	31 August 1991	Commercial	6, 18 & 19	105	106	6	Yes	Yes	130
CNC3	26 September 2005	Commercial	12 &14	103	103	5	Yes	Yes	131
Darut Tarbiyah – The Islamic Network (T.I.N.)	2006	Islam	No	116	114	18	10	10	No
Education Channel	2020	Educational	4 & 16	104	104	4	4		
Gayelle	16 February 2004	Community	No	107	107	No	5	No	No
ieTV	2005	Indian Culture/News/Hinduism	No	113	101	9	7	1	No
Islamic Broadcast Network	28 October 2005	Islam	No	108	108	18	8	Yes	No
TV Jaagriti	February 2015	Hinduism	No	119	109	15	14	9	No
Sankhya TV	2010	Hinduism	No	117	102	17	13	13	No
Synergy TV	March 2003	Local & Caribbean Music	33	112	111	16	12	15	134
T&T Entertainment Network (TTEN)	January 2017	Local & Caribbean Music	No	111	117	20	10	No	No
Trinidad and Tobago Television (TTT)	24 August 1962 (originally); 30 August 2018 (relaunch)	Commercial	9 & 13	106	105	7	Yes	Yes	No
The Parliament Channel (Trinidad and Tobago)	18 August 2006	Public Affairs	11, 26 & 29	109	110	11	Yes	No	No
Tobago Channel 5	2001	Community	5 (Tobago Only)	No	No	No	No	No	No
Tobago Inspirational Network (TIN)	2012	Christianity	(Tobago Only)	No	No	No	No	No	No
Trinity TV	1993	Roman Catholic	No	151	113	12	15	No	No
WESN	2020	Community	No	110	118	21	17	7	No
Multicultural Television (MCTV)	May 2021	News, Weather & Sports	No	114	119	22	18	2	No

== Over-The-Air Television Networks ==
- Trinidad and Tobago Television (TTT Channels 9 & 13) – (1962–2005 as Channels 2 & 13) – State owned television station re-launched in 2018.
- CNC3 Television (CNC3) – National television station owned by Guardian Media Limited.
- The Caribbean Communications Network Limited (CCN TV6) – A national television station owned by OCM Ltd, publishers of the Barbados Nation and the Trinidad Express.
- Advance Community Television Station (ACTS25) – A religious community station serving the city of San Fernando.
- Parliament of the Republic of Trinidad and Tobago – (The Parliament Channel) – Broadcasts proceedings of the Parliament of Trinidad and Tobago.
- Tobago Channel 5 – Airs Tobago based programming – Broadcasts in Tobago only.

== Non-Commercial Television Networks ==
- The Parliament Channel – Broadcasts proceedings of the Parliament of Trinidad and Tobago.
- Education Channel (Channels 4 & 16) - State owned television re-launched in 2020 under the Ministry of Education.

== Cable-Only Television Stations ==
- Darut Tarbiyah – The Islamic Network (TIN) – Broadcasts Islamic Programming.
- Gayelle Television (Gayelle) – Broadcasts local and cultural programming.
- TV Jaagriti – Broadcasts Hindu and Indian programming.
- ieTV (ieTV ) – Broadcasts Indian Cultural, current Affairs and News programmes.
- Islamic Broadcasting Network (IBN 8) – Broadcasts community and Islamic programming.
- Sankhya Television – Broadcasts Hindu and Indian programming.
- Synergy Entertainment Network Television (Synergy TV) – Music channel with original programming featuring local and Caribbean artistes.
- T&T Entertainment Network (TTEN) – Music channel with original programming featuring local and Caribbean artistes.
- Tobago Inspirational Network (TIN) - Broadcasts Christian programming in the isle of Tobago on the Trico Cable Network Channel 137.
- Trinity Communications Network (Trinity TV) – Formerly The Trinity Network (TTN) – Broadcasts Roman Catholic programming.
- "WE" Entertainment, Sport and News (WESN) - Broadcasts local and cultural programming.

== Subscription Television Broadcasters ==
- bmobile (Telecommunications Services of Trinidad and Tobago Limited) – National
- Digicel+ – National
- DirecTV Limited – National
- FLOW (Cable & Wireless Communications) – National
- Green Dot Limited – National
- Amplia (Formerly Massy Communications) – National
- Independent Cable Network of Trinidad and Tobago (ICNTT) – Major Territorial Network
- TRICO Industries Limited – Minor Territorial (Tobago only)
- Air Link Communications – Niche – Princes Town and Environs
- Mayaro Cable Television (MCTV) – Niche – Mayaro and Guayaguayare
- RVR International Limited – Niche – Princes Town and Rio Claro

== Defunct Television Networks ==
- Caribbean New Media Group Limited – (CTV Channels 9 & 13) – (2006–2018) – State owned national station.
- Trinidad & Tobago Television (TTT Channels 9 & 14) – (1983–1990) – State owned television station.
- AVM Television (Channels 4 & 16) – (1992–1996) – Privately owned television station.
- The Information Channel (TIC Channels 4 & 16) – (1997–2005) – State owned television station.
- National Carnival Commission (NCC TV4 Channels 4 & 16) – (2005–2011) – State owned television station.
- Government Information Services Limited (GISL Channels 4 & 16) – (2011–2017) – State owned television station.
- Caribbean Video Network (CVN) – (1996–2002) – Privately owned cable television network based in Tobago.
- SUN TV – (1996–1998) – Privately owned cable television network.
- West Indian Network (WIN TV) – (2007–2016) – Privately owned cable and over-the-air television station.

== See also ==
- Communications in Trinidad and Tobago
- Radio in Trinidad and Tobago
