= ACTS =

Acts or ACTS may refer to:

== Christianity ==
- Acts of the Apostles (genre), a genre of early Christian literature
- Acts of the Apostles, the fifth book in the Bible's New Testament
- ACTS Retirement-Life Communities, a faith-based long-term care network
- Action of Churches Together in Scotland, the national ecumenical organisation for inter-church relations in Scotland
- ACTS: adoration, contrition, thanksgiving, and supplication: aspects of prayer in the Catholic Church

== Communications and television ==
- Advance Community Television Station, a television station in Trinidad and Tobago
- Advanced Communications Technology Satellite (ACTS), a satellite launched in 1993 by Space Shuttle Discovery on mission STS-51
- American Christian Television System, a defunct television network run by the Southern Baptist Convention
- Air Corps Tactical School, the first military professional development school for officers of the US Army Air Service and US Army Air Corps
- Advanced Crew Transportation System, a proposed joint European/Russian/Japanese crewed spaceflight system

== Computing, automation, computer networks ==
- Automated Coin Toll System, a system used for collecting coins at payphones

== Healthcare ==
- Administrative, Clerical, Technical and Supervisory section of the former TGWU, a British trade union, now amalgamated into the Unite trade union

== Transportation ==
- ACTS Nederland BV, railfreight company in the Netherlands
- ACTS (roller container), Abroll Container Transport System (German) or Afzet Container Transport Systeem (Dutch), a type of intermodal road/rail container system designed for operation without the use of cranes or lifting gear

== See also ==
- Act (disambiguation)
- ACT (disambiguation)
- Artemisinin-based Combination Therapies, an antimalarial medication
