= United Islamic Organisation of Trinidad and Tobago =

Islamic organization based in Trinidad and Tobago

The United Islamic Organisation of Trinidad and Tobago is an umbrella organization designed to promote and facilitate harmony and co-operation among the smaller Muslim associations in Trinidad and Tobago.

== History ==
These organizations had applied for membership in the Muslim Co-ordinating Council of Trinidad & Tobago (MCC) comprising the "big three" of ASJA, TIA, and the TML in July 1989. However the guidelines of the MCC effectively prevented any of these smaller organizations from joining the MCC. Therefore, in September 1989 these organisations formed the Council of Islamic Organisations of Trinidad and Tobago. In February 1990 the name was changed to the United Islamic Organisation. In 2000 the UIO was incorporated by an Act of Parliament.

Faiz Amin, chairman of the United Islamic Organisation of Trinidad and Tobago, helped to raise funds for assistance to people who survived the Asian tsunami disaster.

The UIO was one of several Muslim organizations that opposed statements by a leader of Jamaat Al Muslimeen demanding payment of supposedly unpaid charitable contributions from rich Muslims.

== Members ==
The following organisations are members of the UIO: Dar ul Uloom, Iqra Productions, Islamic Dawah Movement, Islamic Trust, Muslim Credit Union, Muslim Youth Brigade, North Eastern Muslim Youths, Tobago Muslim Association, UWI Islamic Society, Islamic Resource Society (joined in 1995) and Islamic Housing Co-operative (joined in 1996).

The following organizations have observer status with the UIO: Abdul Aziz Trust, Majlisul Ulama (in 1992), Islamic Missionaries Guild (founding member, downgraded in status in 1999), Islamic Fadaa’il Services Trust (founding member, downgraded in status in 1999).

Former member: Jamaat al Muslimeen (founding member, left in 1994).

== See also ==
- Islam in Trinidad and Tobago
- Organisation of Islamic Cooperation
