= Islam in Trinidad and Tobago =

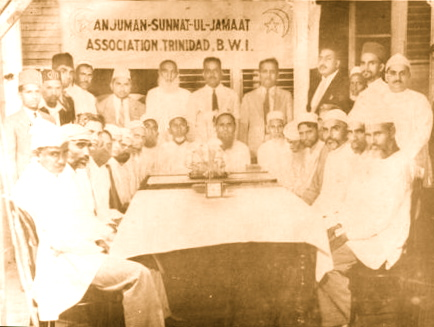
Anjuman Sunnat-ul-Jamaat Association members (1936)

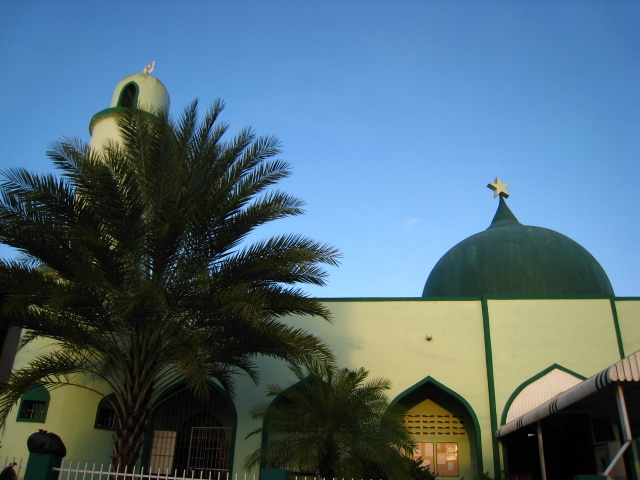
A mosque in Montrose, Chaguanas.

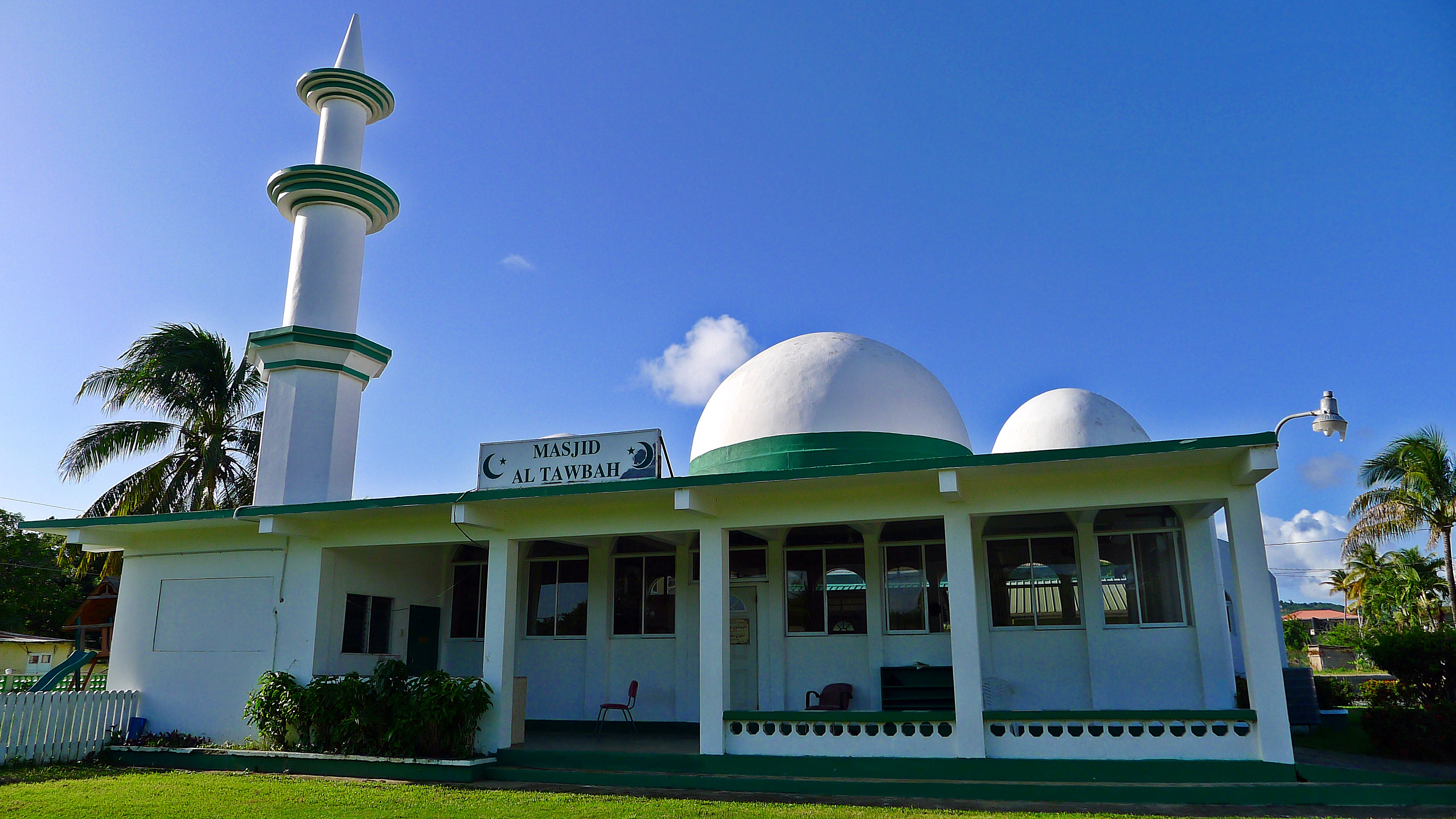
Masjid al Tawbah in Lowlands, Tobago

Muslims constitute 5.6 percent of the population of Trinidad and Tobago. The majority live in Trinidad but there are a handful in Tobago as well.

== History ==
The first Muslims to arrive in the country arrived from Africa brought as slaves by the colonists. The second group arrived in 1816 as a small proportion of those of the Corps of Colonial Marines who were African and had been recruited in 1815 in Georgia during the War of 1812, mostly settled in Fifth and Sixth Companies within the Company Villages near Princes Town. They were followed by African Muslims among disbanded members of the West India Regiments settled between 1817 and 1825 in Manzanilla on the East Coast and in a group of villages south-east of Valencia, and further African Muslims were brought to Trinidad as a result of the Royal Navy's interception of slaving ships following the Slave Trade Acts. From the 1840s, Muslims came from South Asia as part of the Indian indenture system to work on sugar cane and cacao plantations. Muslims today are mostly of South Asian descent but there are converts from all races. In Trinidad there are Islamic primary and secondary schools. The first Muslim secondary school in the country, ASJA Boys' College, San Fernando, was established in 1960.

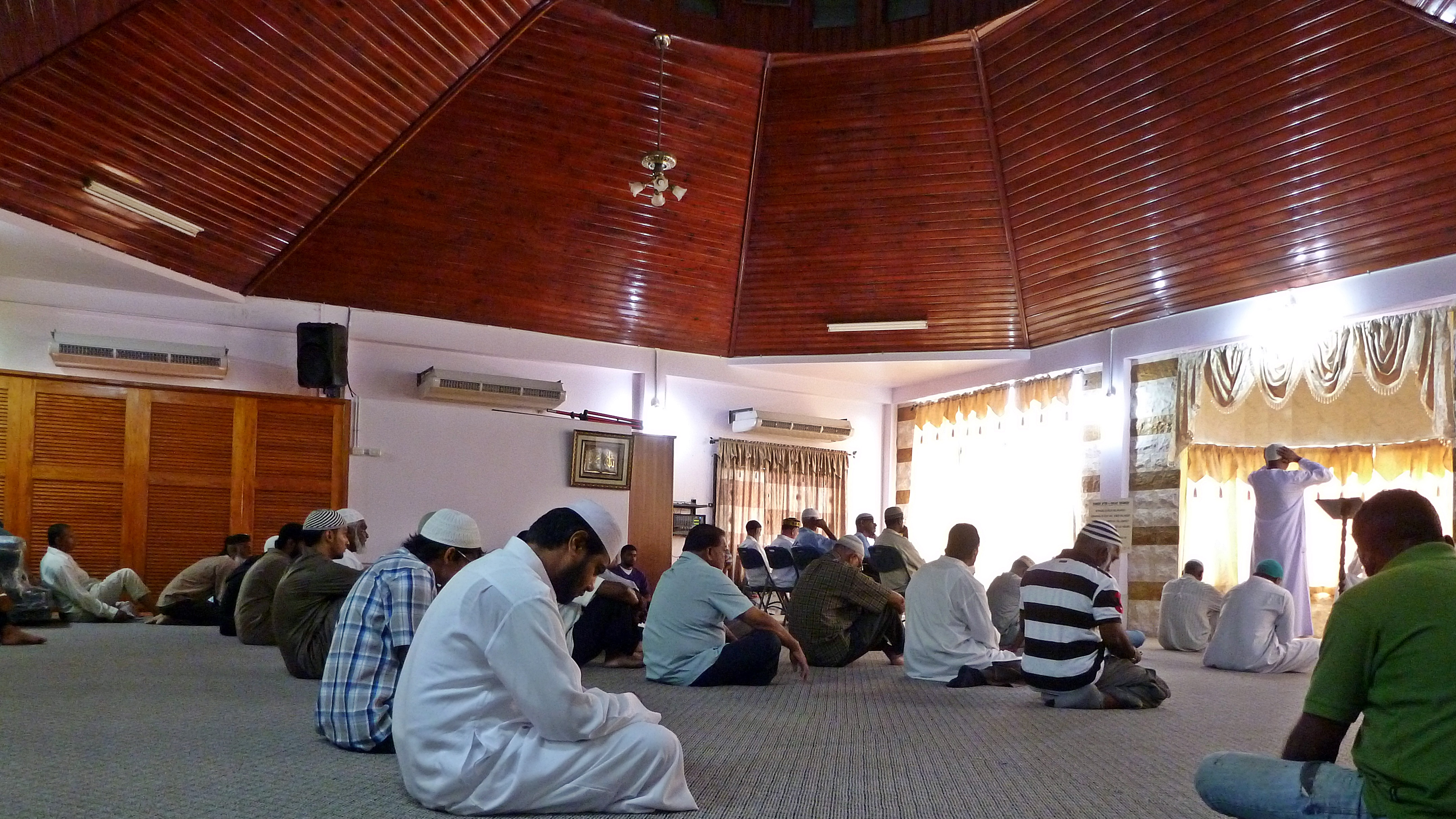
A mosque in Hermitage Village

There are many mosques and Eid ul Fitr is a public holiday.

In 2005, an Islamic television channel IBN Channel 8 was born. In 2006 Darut Tarbiyah - The Islamic Network (T.I.N.) was established.

== Number ==
In 2011, Trinidad and Tobago had 65,705 Muslims, an increase of 1.6% from 64,648 Muslims in 2000. Muslims made up about 5% of the total population in 2011, down from 5.8% in 2000. In 1990, there were 74,262 Muslims living in the country, representing 6.6% of the total population.

Large communities of Muslims live in Princes Town (10.5% of the population in 2000), Chaguanas (9%), Couva–Tabaquite–Talparo (8.7%), Penal–Debe (7.5%) and Mayaro–Rio Claro (7.4%). On the island of Tobago, Muslims make up only 0.5% of the total population.

== Notable Muslims ==
- Inshan Ali
- Wahid Ali, former President of the Senate
- Mahaboob Ben Ali
- Radanfah Abu Bakr
- Yasin Abu Bakr, leader of the attempted coup d’état of 1990.
- Khalid Hassanali
- Noor Hassanali, former President
- Imran N. Hosein
- Haji Gokool Meah
- Jamaal Shabazz
- Inshan Ishmael, the owner of IBN
- Saddam Hosein, MP for Barataria/San Juan

== See also ==
- Hosay
- Hosay massacre
- Jonas Mohammed Bath
- Organisation of Islamic Cooperation
- Jamaat al Muslimeen
