= IBN =

IBN or ibn may refer to:

== Communications and media ==
- CNN-News18, Indian news TV channel, formerly CNN-IBN
- Islamic Broadcast Network, Trinidad and Tobago TV station

== Other uses ==
- ibn, patronymic ("son of") in Arabic
- Code page 865, known as IBN in BBS software
- ICICI Bank (NYSE: IBN), bank based in India
- Invariant basis number, in mathematical ring theory
- Internet background noise
