= India–Trinidad and Tobago relations =

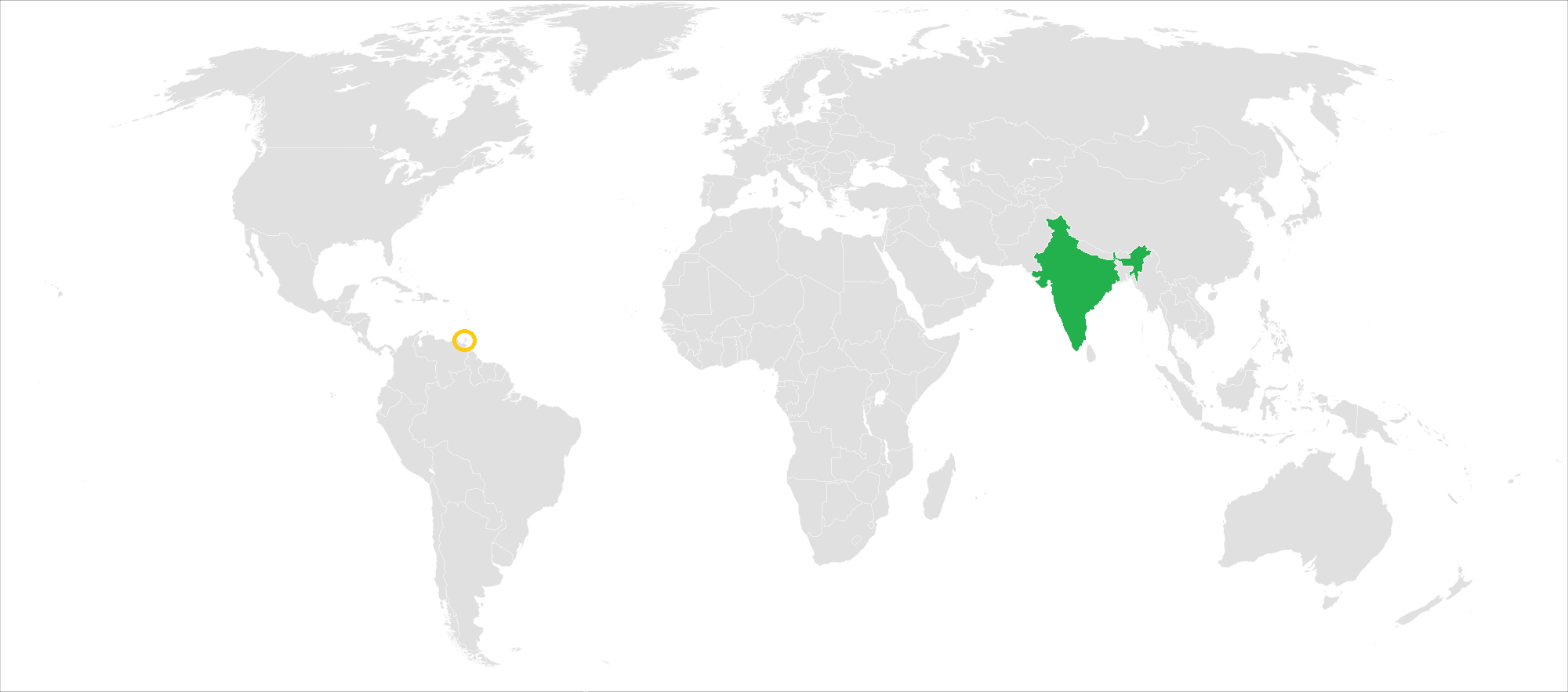

- India: Trinidad and Tobago

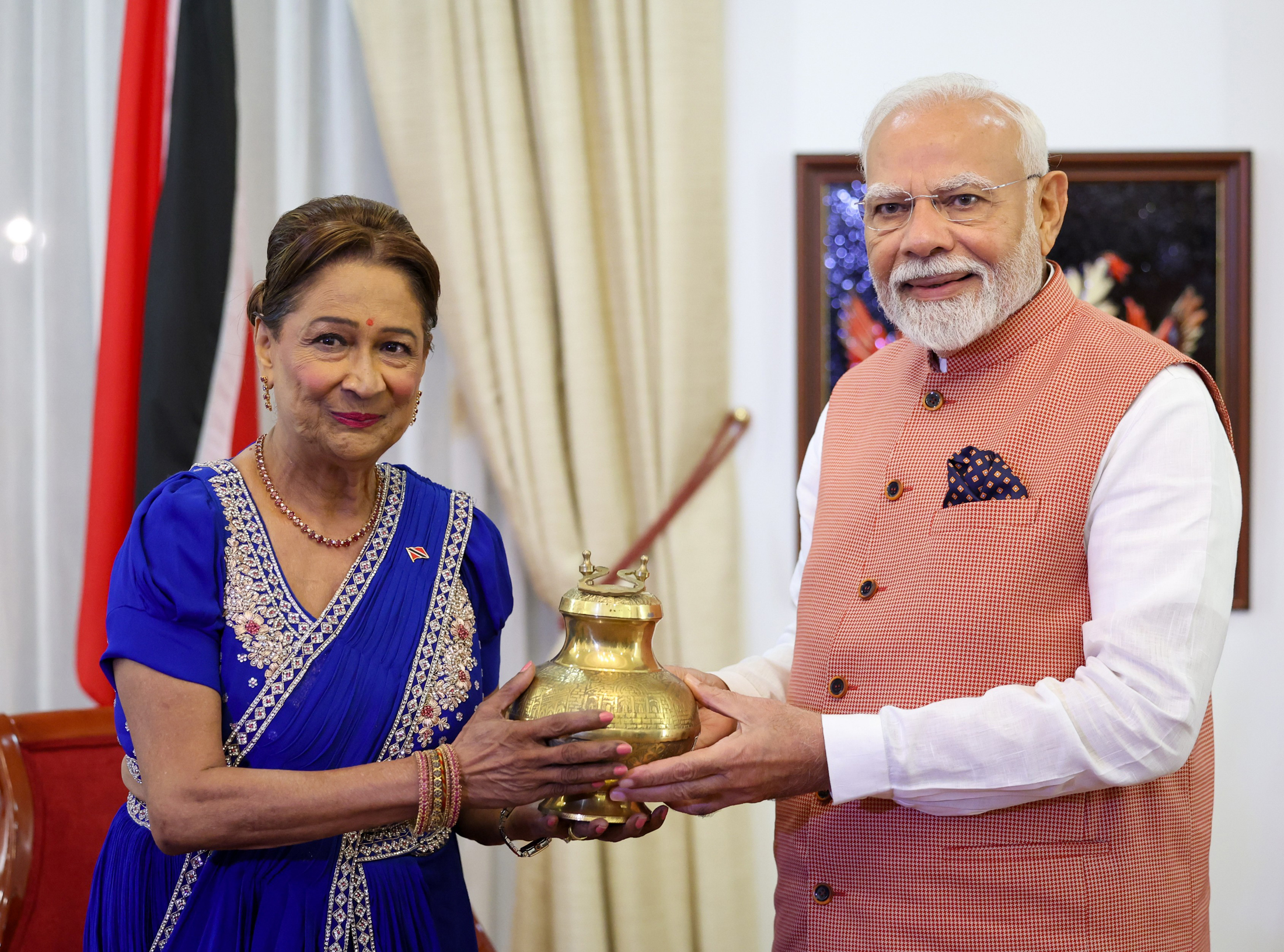
Prime Minister Kamla Persad-Bissessar of Trinidad and Tobago (left) and Prime Minister Narendra Modi of India (right)

Prime Minister Narendra Modi of India (left) and President Christine Kangaloo of Trinidad and Tobago (right)

The bilateral relations between the Republic of India and the Republic of Trinidad and Tobago have considerably expanded in recent years with both nations building strategic and commercial ties. Both nations formally established diplomatic relations in 1962. Indo-Trinidadian and Tobagonians form the largest ethnic group in the country at 37.6% of the total population.

== Background ==
Both nations were colonised by the British Empire; India gained independence in 1947 with local support from Indian advocacy groups in Trinidad and Tobago. India supported the independence of Trinidad and Tobago from colonial rule and established its diplomatic mission in 1962, the year that Trinidad and Tobago officially gained independence from British rule and in 1968 donated the chair that the Speaker of the House of Representatives sits on in Parliament. Trinidad and Tobago's ethnic makeup consists of citizens of Indian descent alongside citizens of African, Chinese, Hispanic, Amerindian, Arab, and mixed descent. The nations possess diverse natural and economic resources and are the largest economies in their respective regions. Both are members of the United Nations, Commonwealth of Nations, G-77 and the Non-Aligned Movement.

== Migration ==
The relationship between India and Trinidad and Tobago started on 30 May 1845, when the Fatel Razack brought 225 indentured labourers to Trinidad from India and continued till 1917. In the mid-20th century to present-day many Indians migrated to Trinidad and Tobago for business, medicine, engineering, sports, and religion. 37% of Trinidad and Tobago's population are of full Indian descent. That number is slightly higher when including multiracial individuals, mostly Dougla people. Hinduism and Islam are the second and third largest religions, respectively, and most of their adherents are of Indian descent.

In the later half of the 20th century up till present-day, Trinidadian and Tobagonians migrated to India for education. Especially those of Indian descent, taking advantage of the scholarships provided by the Government of India to students of Indian descent, who are eligible for overseas Indian citizenship. Some also migrate to India for sports, religious, and heritage purposes. Parvati Khan, who sang the international hit song "Jimmy Jimmy Aaja" in the 1982 Bollywood hit movie Disco Dancer, is an example of this reverse migration. Many Indian indentured immigrants also went back to India after they completed their indentureship term. Some reverse migrated years after being settled in Trinidad and Tobago in the mid-1900s.

== Recent relations ==
In 2010, Indian nationals can now travel to Trinidad and Tobago without a visa and can visit up to 90 days. There has also been initiatives by the Government of India to provide Trinidadians and Tobagonians of Indian descent with Overseas Citizenship of India.

== Bilateral agreements ==
Date	Agreement name	Law ref. number	Note
1985	Cooperation in Science and Technology		
1987	Cultural Cooperation Agreement		
1999	Double Taxation Avoidance Agreement		
February 2003	Political, Economic, Scientific, Technological and Cultural Cooperation		
2007	Bilateral Investment Promotion and Protection Agreement (BIPPA)		
2025	15 bilateral agreements		

== Indian Business companies in Trinidad and Tobago ==
- Bank of Baroda
- New India Assurance Company

- ArcelorMittal
- Intercommercial Bank Limited

== State Visits ==
Prime Minister Basdeo Panday of Trinidad and Tobago made a state visit to India in January of 1997 and was the chief guest at the Republic Day celebrations. He visited his maternal ancestral village of Lakhmanpur in the Azamgarh district of Uttar Pradesh, India. He met with extended members of his family and donated INR₹1.5 million to help develop the village.

Prime Minister Kamla Persad-Bissessar of Trinidad and Tobago embarked on a state visit to India in January of 2012, where she was the chief guest of the Pravasi Bharatiya Divas celebration. She also visited her paternal ancestral village of Bhelupur in Bihar, India.

Prime Minister Indira Gandhi of India was the first Prime Minister of India to make a state visit Trinidad and Tobago in October of 1968.

Prime Minister Atal Bihari Vajpayee of India made a state visit to Trinidad and Tobago in February of 1999.

Prime Minister Manmohan Singh of India led a high-level delegation to Trinidad and Tobago in November of 2009 to attend the Commonwealth Heads of Government Meeting and attended several bilateral and multilateral meetings.

Prime Minister Narendra Modi of India made a state visit to Trinidad and Tobago in July of 2025. Fifteen bilateral agreements were signed and Modi visited several places of significance to the Indian population of Trinidad and Tobago and held various audience with the people of Trinidad and Tobago.

== Diplomacy ==
Of India

- Port of Spain (High Commission) - High Commissioner Bharath Kumar Kuthati

Of Trinidad and Tobago

- New Delhi (High Commission) - High Commissioner Chandradath Singh

== See also ==
- Indo-Trinidadian
- Hinduism in Trinidad and Tobago
- Islam in Trinidad and Tobago
