= Jonas Mohammed Bath =

Community leader in Trinidad (died 1838)

Jonas Mohammed Bath (died September 1838) was a community and religious leader during the nineteenth century in Trinidad. Born in West Africa, he was enslaved and transported to Trinidad in 1804 or 1805. He was able to purchase his freedom, and went on to be leader of the Mandingo population in Trinidad and was described as "chief priest and patriarch" of the entire Muslim population of the colony. Bath petitioned the British government to repatriate the Mandingo community to Africa in 1833 and 1838, but both petitions were rejected.

== Early life ==
Bath was born in West Africa, probably in the region between the Senegal and Gambia Rivers, a region then known as Senegambia. He was most likely a Mande speaker, and may have been Susu. He was literate in Arabic and reportedly educated in Islamic law, which indicated that he came from an elite family. Bath said he was the sultan of Yulliallhad Alimant, and a prince by birth.

== Enslavement ==
Bath was captured by non-Muslim slave traders and transported to Trinidad in 1804 or 1805, just before the 1807 abolition of the slave trade. Instead of being sold to a plantation, Bath was purchased by the government of put to work on the construction of Fort George, which was being constructed on the orders of the British governor, Thomas Hislop. Hislop was concerned that the French would attack Trinidad and wanted the fort build quickly. Upon discovering that Bath was a person of some status, Hislop appointed him foreman of the slave gang working to build the fort.

== Mandingo leader ==
By 1812, Bath had purchased his freedom and was recognised as the leader and magistrate of the community of African Muslims. Historian Carl Campbell describes him as "chief priest and magistrate" of the Mandingo community, and quotes contemporary sources who called Bath the "chief priest and patriarch" of the African Muslim community in Trinidad. In the Caribbean, the term Mandingo was used fairly broadly, not merely for Mandinka people, but for anyone people from the Senegambia region, especially Muslims.

Because the demand for public works was so high and the supply of labour limited, Bath was unable to buy his freedom directly. Instead, he was required to purchase another enslaved person at a cost of $500 and turn them over to the government as a replacement for his own labour. The community went on to purchase the freedom of the enslaved Mandingo people. Historian Bridget Brereton estimated that they purchased the freedom of between 50 and 70 enslaved people, which she called a "remarkable achievement" given that the price of slaves was high in Trinidad. Mohammedu Sisei, another member of the community, reported that the cost of freeing enslaved people ranged between $300 and $700 per person. By the time slavery was abolished in 1834, the free Mandingo community consisted of 140 people and, according to Bath "few, if any" of them were still enslaved.

From at least 1812, Bath was treated as a magistrate with authority over the Mandingo community. Henry Fuller, the attorney general of Trinidad from 1812 to 1832, allowed Bath to adjudicate over disputes among members of the community, and often had Bath countersign their statements, since they would make official statements in Arabic and swore oaths using the Qur'an.

== Repatriation attempts ==
In 1833, Bath petitioned the British government to assist the community to return to Africa. Although the slave trade had been abolished, slavery was still legal, and Bath requested assistance from the British Navy to return home safely. The petition was rejected. In 1838, Bath petitioned the Colonial Secretary to help them return to Africa, noting that their knowledge of English and loyal to Britain made them "ideal agents" to bring British culture and civilisation to Africa. Although the Governor of Trinidad met with Bath to discuss the petition, it was ultimately rejected. Bath died in September 1838 and was succeeded by Muhammadu Maguina as patriarch of the Mandingo community.
