= De Scene =

- Genre: Music video countdown
- Presented by: Keisha Marie Charles
- Country of origin: Trinidad and Tobago

Production
- Executive producer: Peter C. Lewis

Original release
- Network: Synergy TV

De Scene (/də ˈsiːn/) is a one-hour show which airs on Synergy TV in Trinidad and Tobago, hosted by Keisha Marie Charles. It is a music video countdown show which airs on weekdays at 6 p.m. Viewers are asked to text the codes of their favourite videos and this influences which videos will appear on the countdown and in what position. The videos that appear on De Scene are usually those of local and regional artists.

While hosting the video countdown, Keisha Marie Charles also visits places of interest in Trinidad and Tobago while interviewing local and regional celebrities, performers and members of the public during the taping of the countdown.
