= Peter Jamadar =

Justice Peter Jamadar is a former Justice of Appeal in the Court of Appeal of the Republic of Trinidad and Tobago. Justice Jamadar served as a Judge in the High Court until his elevation to the Court of Appeal in 2008. As of July 4, 2019, Justice Jamadar has been a judge on the bench of the Caribbean Court of Justice.

== Trinity Cross judgement ==
One of the most public cases he presided over was High Court Action 2065 of 2004, in the San Fernando High Court. This was a constitutional motion filed by Satnarayan Maharaj, secretary general of the Sanatan Dharma Maha Sabha, and Inshan Ishmael, president of the Islamic Relief Centre. The applicants in the case had challenged the constitutionality of the Trinity Cross, Trinidad & Tobago's highest national award, on the grounds that its continued existence and award were in breach of the applicants' fundamental rights as guaranteed by certain Sections of the Constitution. The lawyer for the applicants argued that the State kept the Trinity Cross, knowing that “non-Christians are unable and unwilling to accept (it) because it is perceived to be and/or in fact is a Christian symbol.” The result is an experience of disparate treatment, or unfair discrimination, for “many deserving non-Christian citizens who... will never be rewarded by the State and country.”

In May 2006, Justice Peter Jamadar, a Christian, ruled that "the Trinity Cross-the nation’s highest award-is strictly a Christian symbol, and as a result, it discriminates in a multi-religious society.... In my opinion, leaving aside the savings clause argument for the moment, the respondent has shown no accommodation whatsoever to ameliorate the indirect adverse discriminating effects of the award of the Trinity Cross on the applicants as Hindus and Muslims and as corporate citizens representing Hindus and Muslims in T&T."

Although he found it to be discriminatory, he said that it does not mean that the court can strike it down. As it was protected by the 1976 constitution, it is a matter for the Parliament of Trinidad and Tobago to change.
