= Inshan Ishmael =

Trinidadian broadcaster (d. 2025)

Inshan Ishmael (1967 or 1968 – 29 August 2025) was a Trinidadian Islamic broadcaster. He came into the public eye with his launching of an Islamic television station in Trinidad and Tobago, the Islamic Broadcast Network, where he hosted a popular talk show, "Breaking Barriers" and for his historic court action against the state for using the Trinity Cross as the nation's highest award. In January 2007 he again received national attention when he was arrested under the Anti-Terro.

== Trinity Cross issue ==
In June 2005, High Court Action 2065 of 2004 was heard before Justice Peter Jamadar in the San Fernando High Court. This was a constitutional motion filed by Satnarayan Maharaj, secretary general of the Sanatan Dharma Maha Sabha, and Inshan Ishmael. The applicants in the case had challenged the constitutionality of the Trinity Cross on the grounds that its continued existence and award were in breach of the applicants’ fundamental rights as guaranteed by certain Sections of the Constitution. The lawyer for the applicants argued that the State kept the Trinity Cross, knowing that "non-Christians are unable and unwilling to accept (it) because it is perceived to be and/or in fact is a Christian symbol." The result is an experience of disparate treatment, or unfair discrimination, for "many deserving non-Christian citizens who... will never be rewarded by the State and country."

In May 2006, Justice Peter Jamadar ruled that "the Trinity Cross - the nation’s highest award - is strictly a Christian symbol, and as a result, it discriminates in a multi-religious society." "In my opinion, leaving aside the savings clause argument for the moment, the respondent has shown no accommodation whatsoever to ameliorate the indirect adverse discriminating effects of the award of the Trinity Cross on the applicants as Hindus and Muslims and as corporate citizens representing Hindus and Muslims in T&T." Although he found it to be discriminatory, he said that it does not mean that the court can strike it down. As it was protected by the 1976 constitution, it is a matter for the Parliament to change.

== Arrest and allegation of civil rights violations ==
At the beginning of January 2007, Ishmael called for private owned businesses to close for two days across the nation, to bring media attention to the spiraling crime situation. He called for the 25 and 26 January to be the days of the shutdown, and for an anti-crime rally to be held on Saturday 27 January. Thousands of flyers/pamphlets advertising the shutdown and rally were distributed throughout the country.

Permission was given on 16 January, by the San Juan/Laventille Regional Corporation, for the planned anti-crime rally at the Aranguez Savannah. On January 23 the Regional Corporation, controlled by the ruling People's National Movement party, revoked permission for the use of the savannah.

On the 22nd, Police Commissioner Trevor Paul claimed that members of the business community contacted him expressing anxiety about Ishmael's call. Based on four complaints, the contents of which are yet to be made public, the Police Commissioner recommended that the Telecommunications Authority of Trinidad & Tobago (TATT) investigate the alleged conduct of the talk show host. Columbus Communications, the cable company on which IBN TV8 airs, said they have "no choice" but to pull the popular talk show "Breaking Barriers" off the air over complaints by TATT over "questionable content."

At approximately 9:20 p.m. on the eve of the planned shutdown, he was arrested under the Anti-Terrorism Act (2005) by approximately twelve police officers at his home during a barbecue dinner with his friends. The Anti-Terrorism Act (2005), however, does not give the power to the police to arrest except by a detention order of a judge. Also "any act which disrupts any service and is committed in pursuance of a demonstration, protest, or stoppage of work is specially exempted from the definition of a terrorist act."

When he appeared before Chief Magistrate Sherman Mc Nicolls in the Port-of-Spain Eighth Magistrates’ Court, he pleaded not guilty, and was subsequently released on his own bail in the sum of $10,000.

Condemnation for his arrest, the cancellation of the venue for his rally, and the removal of his television show were roundly criticised by various groups including political parties such as the United National Congress, Congress of the People (Trinidad and Tobago), and the Movement for National Development; The All Trinidad Sugar and General Workers’ Trade Union; the community group YesTT; and rights groups such as Disabled People's International and Rights Action Group. Allegations of intimidation by the Government were denied by Cabinet Minister Kenneth Valley who denied even knowing his name.

Although many business places in South and Central Trinidad closed their doors on 25 and 26 January, many business places along the PNM controlled east–west corridor stayed open.

Even though his lawyers succeeded in getting a High Court Judge, Justice Peter Jamadar, to order the San Juan/Laventille Regional Corporation to allow the anti-crime rally on the 27th, Commissioner of Police Trevor Paul did not respond to Ishmael's application for permission to use a public address system. The rally was moved to a site that did not require permission to use a loud speaker and, according to local newspapers, attracted a crowd of several hundreds.

== 2015 accusations from Suruj Rambachan ==
In August 2015, Trinidadian politician Suruj Rambachan publicly accused Inshan Ishmael of targeting him and his family.

== 2017 arms charges ==
In October 2017, Inshan Ishmael was charged with possession of arms to endanger life, possession of ammunition to endanger life and common assault. He was granted bail of $300,000.

== Death ==
Ishmael died from complications of renal cancer on 29 August 2025, at the age of 57.

== Sources ==
- Editorial in the Trinidad Guardian by Independent Senator, and Senior Counsel, Dana Seetahal. January 28 2007.
