= Trinity Cross =

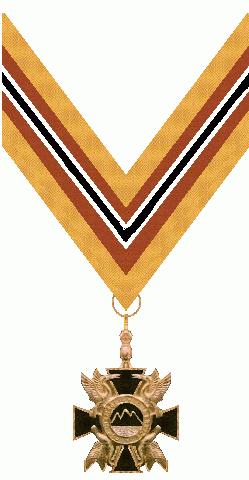
- Trinity Cross in gold
- Type: Three class distinguished service decoration
- Awarded for: distinguished and outstanding service to Trinidad and Tobago. Also awarded for gallantry in the face of the enemy, or for gallant conduct.
- Presented by: Trinidad and Tobago
- Eligibility: Nationals and Non-Nationals
- Post-nominals: TC
- Status: no longer awarded since 2006
- Established: 1969
- Final award: 2005
- Ribbon bar of the award

Precedence
- Next (higher): Order of the Republic of Trinidad and Tobago (since 2008)
- Next (lower): Chaconia Medal

The Trinity Cross (abbreviated T.C. or TC) was the highest of the National Awards of Trinidad and Tobago, between the years 1969 and 2008. It was awarded for: "distinguished and outstanding service to Trinidad and Tobago. It was awarded for gallantry in the face of the enemy, or for gallant conduct." Either nationals or non-nationals were awarded the honour, but no more than five may have been awarded in any year. The President was awarded the Trinity Cross in an ex officio capacity. The award was first presented in 1969, last conferred in 2005, and was subsequently replaced by The Order of the Republic of Trinidad and Tobago (abbreviated O.R.T.T.) in the year 2008.

== Controversy ==
The name of the award has been criticised as being discriminatory against non-Christians (since it used the Christian symbol of the cross).

Prime Minister Dr. Eric Williams in 1972 prevailed upon a reluctant Dr. Wahid Ali, then President of the Senate of Trinidad and Tobago, and a Muslim, to wear the Trinity Cross; he agreed to accept it only after the Prime Minister promised to change the name of the award in the future. In 1973, then Roman Catholic Archbishop Anthony Pantin declined to go on record in favour of renaming the award, but allowed that he lacked "any strong feelings one way or the other."

In 1995 the Dharmacharya (spiritual head of the Hindu organization, Sanatan Dharma Maha Sabha) Pandit Krishna Maharaj, refused to accept the Trinity Cross from Prime Minister Patrick Manning, for his social work on the grounds that it did not represent a true national award involving all religious denominations of Trinidad and Tobago.

In 1997, a cabinet appointed committee was appointed to look at the issue of the Trinity Cross. The committee was chaired by the then Chief Justice, Mr. Justice Michael de la Bastide; recommendations included encouragement of public consultation on the matter, and the suggestion that "The Order of Trinidad & Tobago" should be considered as "the Trinity Cross...was perceived as a Christian symbol" in this multi-religious society.

In June 2005, High Court Action 2065 of 2004 was heard before Mr. Justice Jamadar in the San Fernando High Court. This was a constitutional motion filed by Satnarayan Maharaj (aka Sat Maharaj), secretary general of the Sanatan Dharma Maha Sabha, and Inshan Ishmael, president of the Islamic Relief Centre of Trinidad and Tobago. The applicants in the case had challenged the constitutionality of the Trinity Cross on the grounds that its continued existence and award were in breach of the applicants' fundamental rights as guaranteed by certain Sections of the Constitution. UK based John Horan, Anand Ramlogan and Sir Fenton Ramsahoye, attorneys for the applicants, argued that the State kept the Trinity Cross, knowing that "non-Christians are unable and unwilling to accept (it) because it is perceived to be and/or in fact is a Christian symbol." The result is an experience of disparate treatment, or unfair discrimination, for "many deserving non-Christian citizens who...will never be rewarded by the State and country."

In May 2006, Mr. Justice Jamadar, a Presbyterian, ruled that "the Trinity Cross – the nation's highest award – is strictly a Christian symbol, and as a result, it discriminates in a multi-religious society.... In my opinion, leaving aside the savings clause argument for the moment, the respondent has shown no accommodation whatsoever to ameliorate the indirect adverse discriminating effects of the award of the Trinity Cross on the applicants as Hindus and Muslims and as corporate citizens representing Hindus and Muslims in T&T." Although he found it to be discriminatory, he said that it does not mean that the court can strike it down. As it was protected by the 1976 Constitution, it was a matter for the Parliament to change.

Prime Minister Patrick Manning said in Parliament on 2 June 2006, that the Trinity Cross "will pass into history and this year's National Awards will be conducted on the basis of new and more acceptable arrangements." Manning added that his Cabinet has established a committee, led by UWI history professor Bridget Brereton, to review all aspects of the nation’s highest award and also to examine "such other national symbols and observances which may be considered discriminatory." This led to the creation of a new replacement highest award the Order of the Republic of Trinidad and Tobago, which was first presented in 2008.
