= Indo–Trinidadians and Tobagonians =

Ethnic group

Indo-Trinidadians and Tobagonians
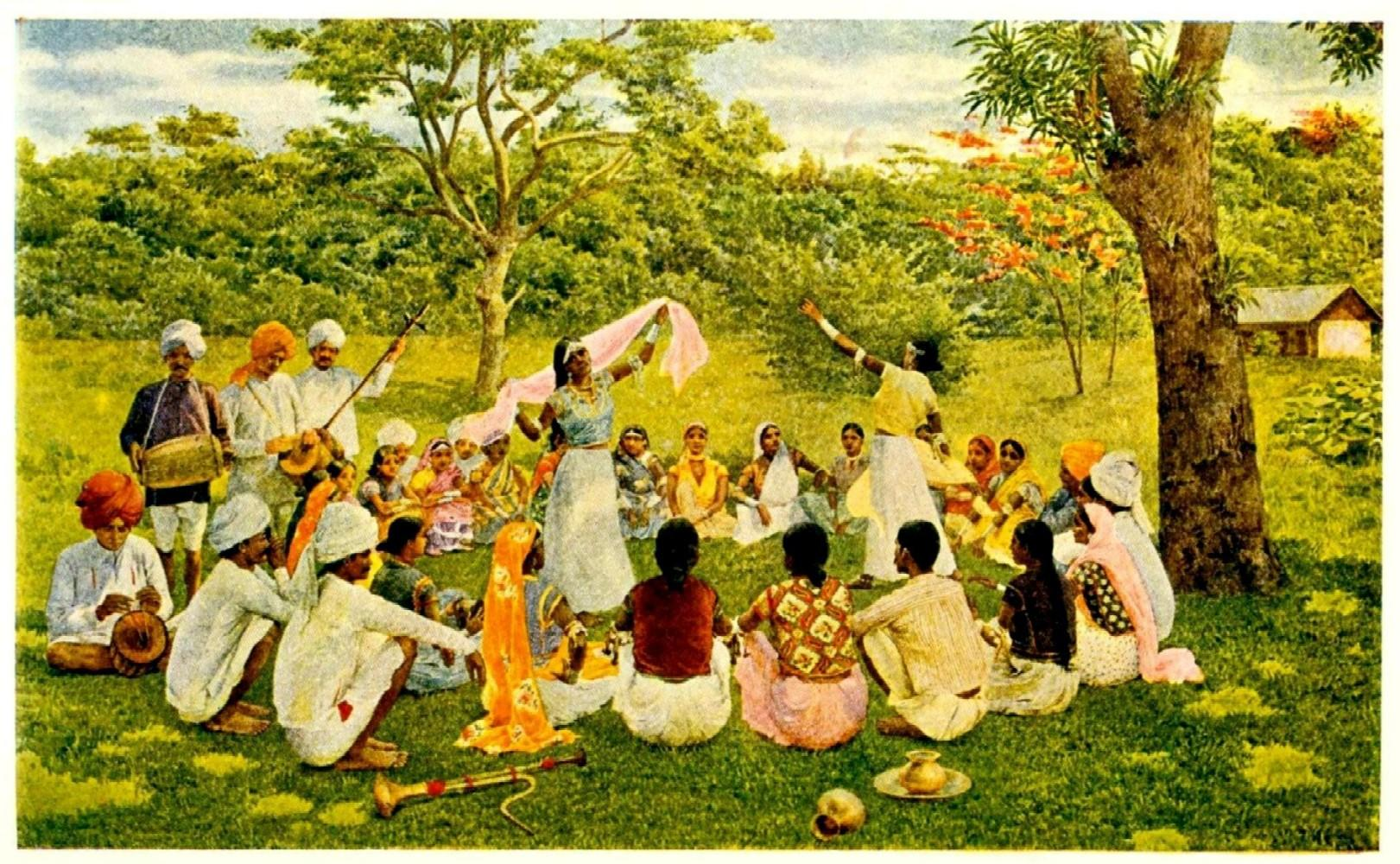
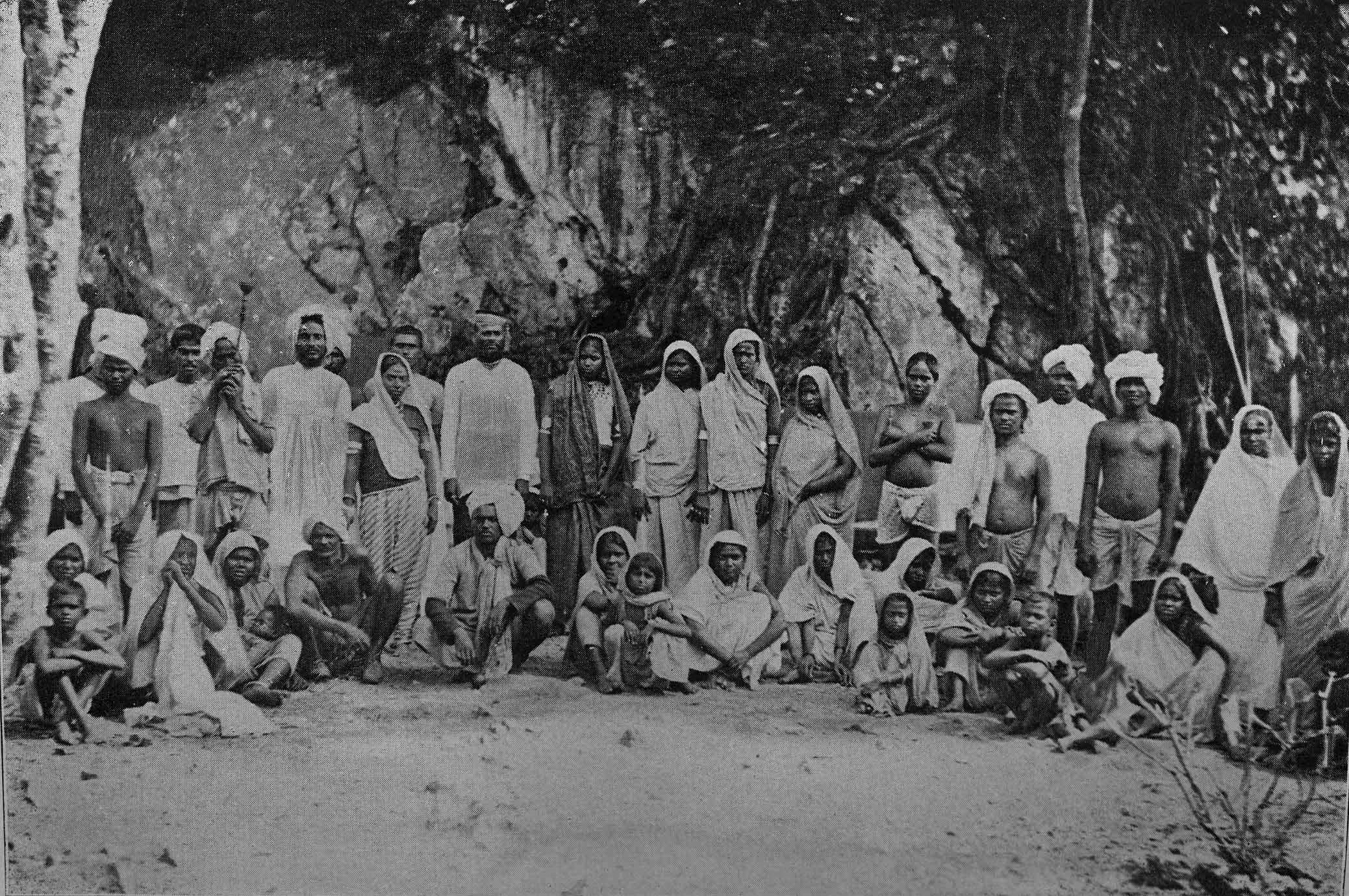
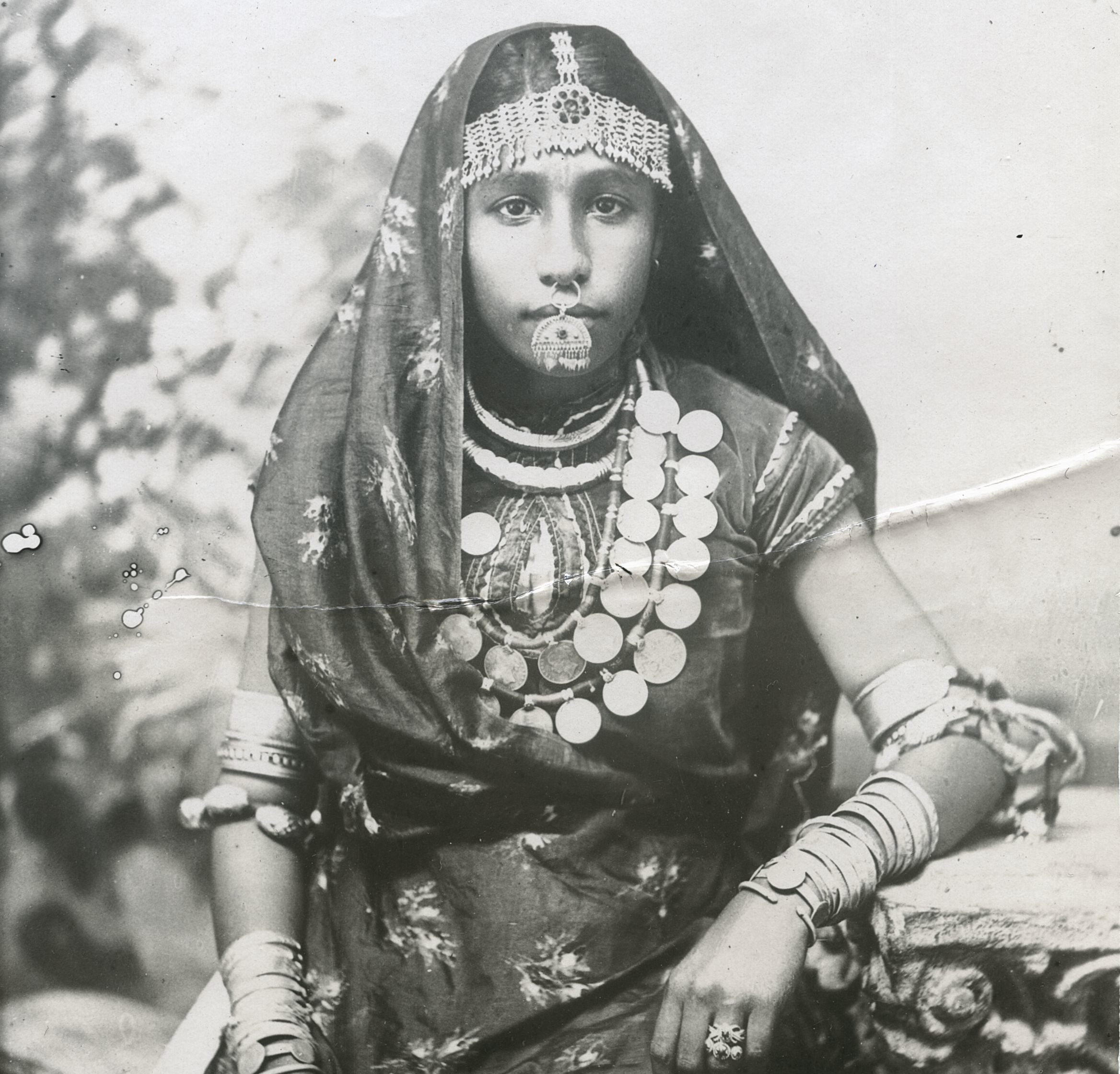
- Early Indo-Trinidadian and Tobagonians

Total population
- c. 718,524

Regions with significant populations
- Concentrated in the South, Central, and East of Trinidad with pockets in the East–West Corridor, St. James, and Diego Martin; Trinidad and Tobago 468,524 (plurality of the population)
- United States: c. 125,000
- Canada: c. 100,000
- United Kingdom: c. 25,000

Languages
- Trinidadian and Tobagonian English (Trinidadian English Creole-Hinglish) · Trinidadian Hindustani

Religion
- Majority: Hinduism; Minority: Christianity · Islam · Others

Related ethnic groups
- Indo-Caribbean people · Indo-Caribbean Americans · British Indo-Caribbean people · Indo-Guyanese · Indo-Surinamese · Indo-Jamaicans · Indo-Grenadians · Indian people · Indo-Fijians · Indo-Mauritians · Indian South Africans · Indian diaspora in Southeast Africa · Indian Singaporeans · Malaysian Indians · Indian diaspora · South Asian diaspora · Bihari-U.P. diaspora · Tamil diaspora · Telugu diaspora · Dougla

Indo–Trinidadians and Tobagonians or Trinidadian and Tobagonian Indians are people from Trinidad and Tobago whose ancestors are of Indian origin that came from India and the wider subcontinent beginning in 1845 during the period of British colonial rule and Indian indentureship.

Indo–Trinidadians and Tobagonians are a subgroup of Indo-Caribbean people, which is a subgroup of the wider Indian and South Asian diaspora. Most Indo-Trinidadians can trace their ancestry back to the Hindi Belt of North India, especially the Bhojpur region of Uttar Pradesh, Bihar, and Jharkhand and the Awadh region of Uttar Pradesh, located in the Indo-Gangetic Plain of the Ganga and Yamuna rivers between the Himalaya and Vindhya mountain ranges. However, some Indo-Trinidadians may trace their ancestry to other parts of South Asia, notably South India, especially Tamil Nadu and Andhra Pradesh.

Indians first arrived in Trinidad and Tobago as jahaji/girmitya indentured labourers from India through the Indian indenture system from 1845 to 1917. Some Indians and other South Asians, along with their families, later came as entrepreneurs, businesspeople, merchants, religious leaders, doctors, engineers, tradespersons, students, academics, or other professionals beginning in the mid-20th century till present-day. Indo-Caribbean people from many other Caribbean nations, such as Guyana, Grenada, Guadeloupe, Jamaica, Martinique, Saint Croix, Saint Kitts and Nevis, and Suriname, also immigrated to Trinidad and Tobago.

Indo–Trinidadians and Tobagonians are the largest ethnic group in Trinidad and Tobago, identified by the official census, accounting for about 35.43% of the population in 2011.

== History ==
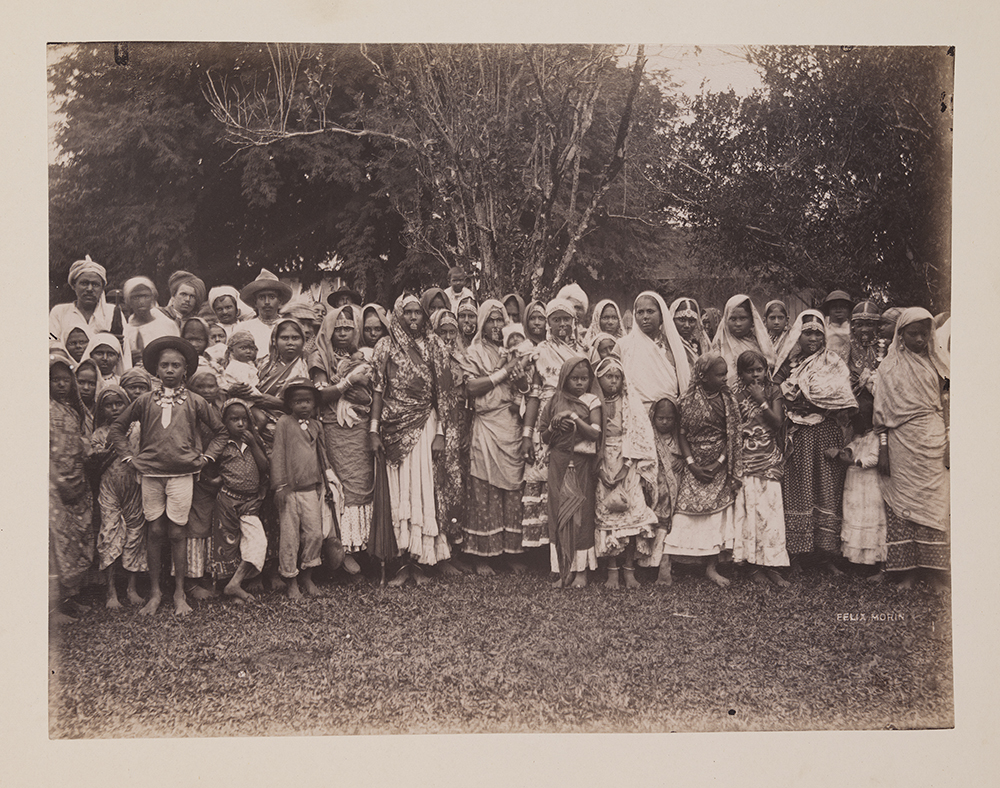
Early East Indian indentured laborers in Trinidad.

Of 94,135 Indian immigrants to Trinidad, between 1874 and 1917, 50.7 percent were from the United Provinces of Agra and Oudh, 24.4 percent came from Oudh State, 13.5 percent were from Bihar Province and lesser numbers from various other parts of the British Raj, such as the Madras Presidency, Bengal Presidency, Central Provinces, Chota Nagpur Division, Bombay Presidency, and Punjab Province. Out of 134,118 indentured labourers from India, 5,000 who left from the Port of Madras distinguished themselves as "Madrasi" and the immigrants who left from the Port of Calcutta distinguished themselves as "Kalakatiyas".

Many were people who were escaping poverty in India and seeking employment offered by the British for jobs either as indentured labourers, workers or educated servicemen, primarily, between 1845 and 1917.

The demand for Indian indentured labourers increased dramatically after the abolition of slavery in 1834. They were sent, sometimes in large numbers, to plantation colonies that produced high-value crops, such as sugar, in Africa and the Caribbean.

== Culture ==
=== Music ===
Indo-Trinidadians have played a foundational role in preserving Indian musical traditions in Trinidad and Tobago. Indian indentured labourers brought instruments such as the tassa, dholak, tabla, harmonium, sitar, and bansuri from the Indian subcontinent. Tassa became particularly important to Indo-Trinidadian culture and remains prominent at weddings, Hosay, religious celebrations, and other cultural events.

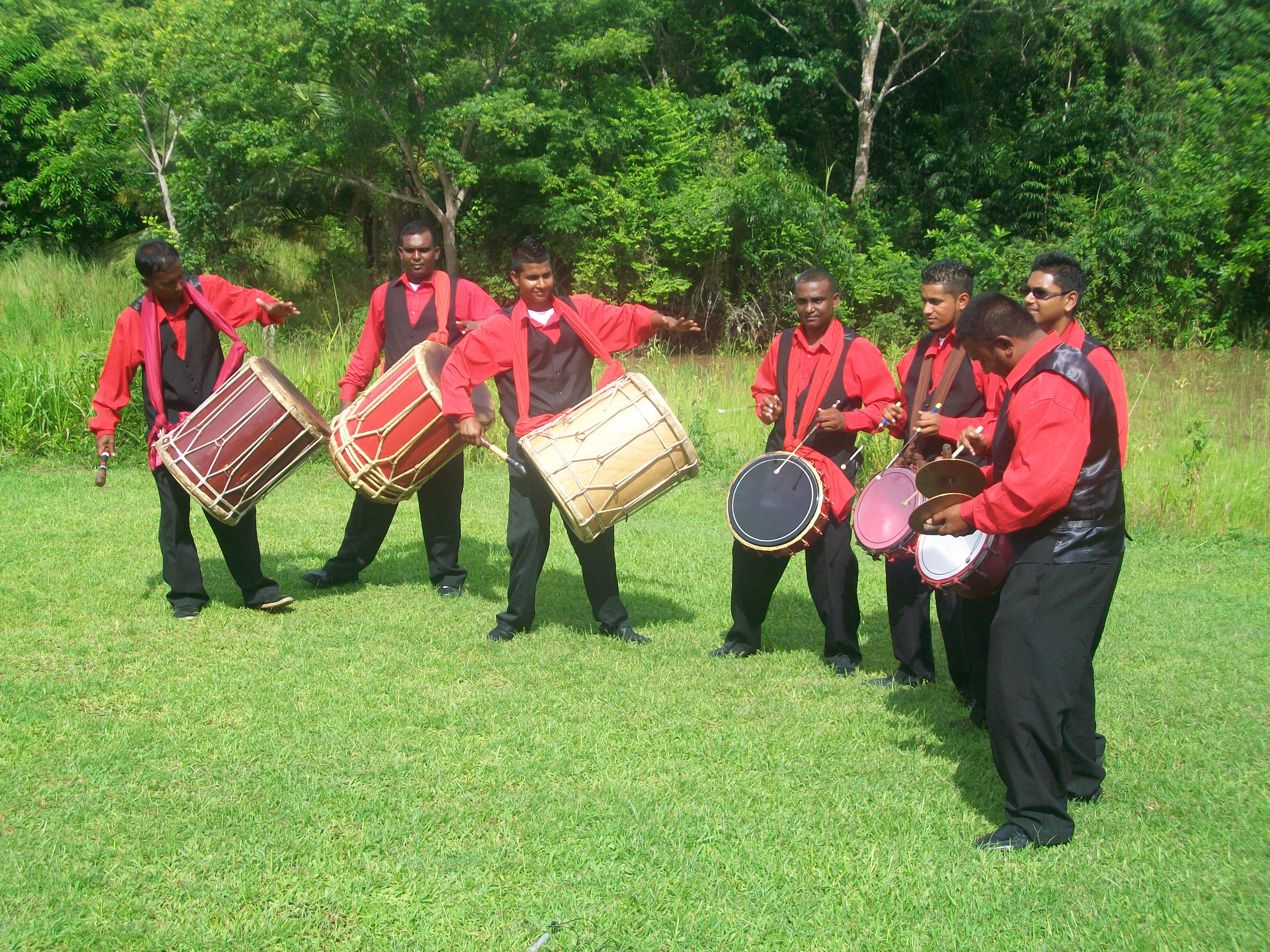
Indo-Trinidadian Tasa players.

Tassa developed into a distinctive Trinidadian form of Indian-derived drumming, combining musical traditions brought by Indian immigrants with the cultural environment of Trinidad and Tobago. Groups of tassa drummers perform together using multiple drums, creating interlocking rhythms that have become strongly associated with Indo-Trinidadian celebrations and public cultural events.

Chutney music also developed within the Indo-Trinidadian community from Indian folk-song traditions adapted to the social and cultural environment of Trinidad. It later developed into chutney soca, a fusion of East Indian musical traditions with Trinidadian soca. Chutney soca incorporates Indian-derived melodies, rhythms and lyrical traditions with the rhythms and instrumentation of soca, contributing to the broader multicultural character of Trinidad and Tobago’s popular music.

Together, these traditions form an important part of Indo-Trinidadian cultural expression and demonstrate how Indian musical traditions were preserved, adapted and transformed within the Caribbean environment. Indo–Trinidadian and Tobagonians have retained their distinctive heritage and culture, while also functioning in a multicultural society. The South Asian languages of their ancestors have largely been lost, although a number of these words have entered the Trinidadian vernacular language (Trinidadian Creole). Indian movies, music, and cuisine have entered the mainstream culture of Trinidad and Tobago. Chutney and chutney soca music rivals calypso and soca music during the Carnival season.

=== Sports ===
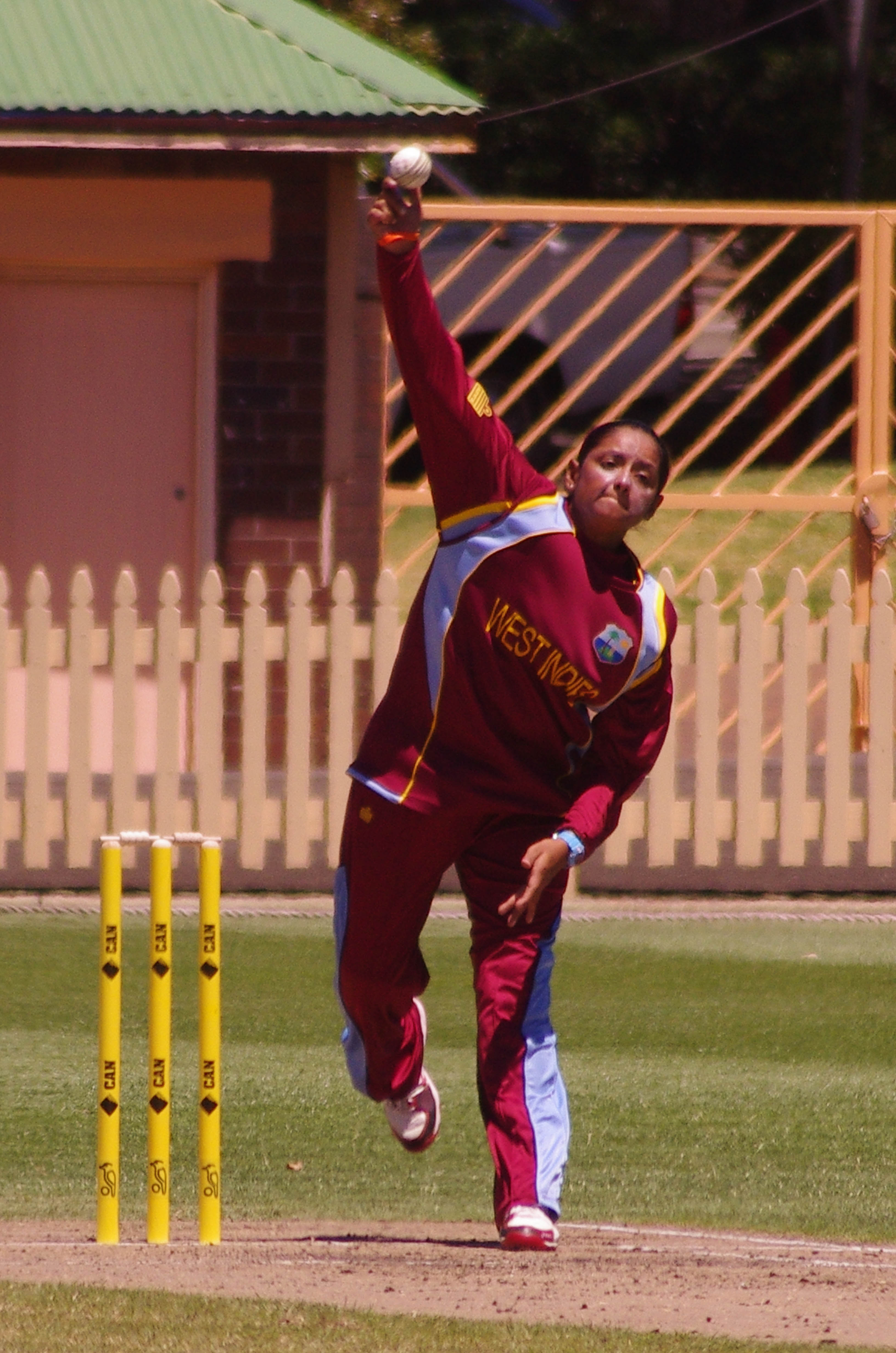
Anisa Mohammed representing Trinidad and Tobago in international cricket.

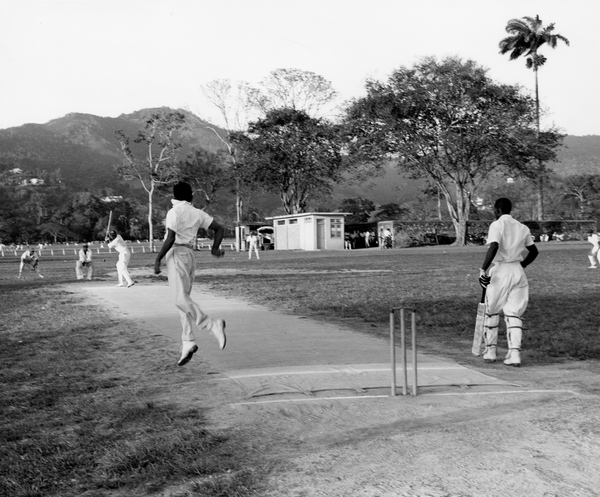
A game of cricket in Trinidad, 1960.

Cricket in Trinidad, 2025.

Cricket has a particularly strong historical and cultural association with Indo-Trinidadian communities, especially in central and southern Trinidad. The sport was introduced to the Caribbean during the period of British colonial rule and had become established in Trinidad by the 19th century. The first recorded first-class cricket in the West Indies dates to 1864–65, while Trinidad, British Guiana (present-day Guyana) and Barbados became the principal participants in the early inter-colonial cricket competitions. The first Inter-Colonial Tournament involving the three colonies was held in 1891, establishing an important regional cricketing tradition linking Trinidad and British Guiana."History of cricket in the West Indies to 1918"."Inter-Colonial Tournament".

The development of Indo-Trinidadian cricket occurred within the wider history of Indian indentureship in the British Caribbean. Between 1845 and 1917, approximately 147,592 Indian indentured labourers arrived in Trinidad, primarily to work on sugar plantations, with the majority eventually making Trinidad their home. Indian communities also developed in British Guiana, where cricket became an important part of social and community life. By the early 20th century, Indian communities in both colonies were organizing their own cricket clubs and competing against established clubs. In 1914, the British Guiana East Indian Cricket Club was established in Georgetown, and the club invited the established Oriental Cricket Club of Trinidad, which was composed of Indo-Trinidadians, to participate in its inaugural celebrations. The Trinidad club defeated the newly formed British Guiana Indian side, demonstrating that organized cricket had already developed within Trinidad's Indian community."Indian Arrival Day 2026: Celebrating the journey of the girmitiyas". National Archives of Trinidad and Tobago.Seecharan, Clem (26 February 2026). "The Limitations of Guyanese Cricket before the Eradication of Malaria". Stabroek News.

Cricket subsequently became particularly prominent in the Indo-Trinidadian communities of central and southern Trinidad, where sugar estates and surrounding villages provided important settings for the development of clubs and competitions. Indian cricket teams were organized on sugar plantations and in villages, while predominantly Indo-Trinidadian clubs increasingly participated in the wider Trinidadian cricket structure. One example was the Wanderers Cricket Club, established in 1951 at the Brechin Castle sugar estate in central Trinidad. Cricket also provided a route for social mobility and greater participation in the institutions governing the sport, as Indo-Trinidadian clubs and administrators became increasingly influential in Trinidad and Tobago cricket during the 20th century.Rampersad, Anand (2014). "Beyond C.L.R. James: Race and Ethnicity in Sport". Research in the Sociology of Sport: 247–264.

The connection between Indo-Trinidadians and cricket became especially visible at the international level with Sonny Ramadhin, who in 1950 became the first Indo-Trinidadian to play Test cricket for the West Indies cricket team. Ramadhin took 158 wickets in 43 Tests and became one of the leading spin bowlers of his generation. He was followed by numerous Trinidadian cricketers of Indian ancestry, including Inshan Ali, Daren Ganga, Denesh Ramdin, Ravi Rampaul and Sunil Narine. Trinidad and Tobago has therefore played a significant role in the development of Indo-Caribbean cricket, producing players who have represented the West Indies as well as, in some cases, other national sides."A sixty year milestone". Trinidad and Tobago Newsday. 6 July 2013.

Cricket has also contributed to the broader cultural identity of Trinidad and Tobago rather than remaining exclusively associated with one ethnic community. Trinidadian-born players such as Brian Lara became internationally renowned figures in West Indian cricket, while later Trinidadian players such as Joshua Da Silva continued the country's presence in international Test cricket. Lara scored 11,953 Test runs for the West Indies and held the Test record for an individual innings with 400 not out, while Da Silva made his Test debut for the West Indies in 2020."Brian Lara". Cricket West Indies."Joshua Da Silva". Cricket West Indies.

=== Holidays and festivals ===
Diwali, Eid ul-Fitr, and Indian Arrival Day are national holidays, and Phagwah/Holi, Maha Shivratri, Hanuman Jayanti, Ram Naumi, Sita Naumi, Navratri, Vijayadashami, Krishna Janmashtami, Radhastami, Saraswati Jayanti, Raksha Bandhan, Vivaha Panchami, Guru Purnima, Ganesh Chaturthi, Kartik Snan, Ratha Saptami, Karagam Puja, Kalbhairo Jayanti, Mesha Sankranti, Makar Sankranti, Tulsi Vivah, Gita Jayanti, Datta Jayanti, Ratha Yatra, Gurpurab, Buddha Purnima, Ramadan, Hosay (Ashura), Eid al-Adha, Mawlid, Shab-e-barat, Chaand Raat, Islamic New Year, and other Hindu and Muslim holidays are widely celebrated.

=== Cuisine ===
Indo-Trinidadian and Tobagonian cuisine is mostly derived from the Bhojpuri and Awadhi cuisines of North India. It has considerable South Indian, especially Tamil and Telugu, influence on preparation and ingredients in the tropical environment of Trinidad and Tobago, which was similar to the tropical environment of South India, where a significant minority of Indians came from. There is also influence from other ethnic cuisines on the island such as Creole, Chinese, West African, Indigenous, French, British, North American, Portuguese, Arab, and Latin American cuisines. It is unlike the mainstream Indian-South Asia cuisines, which are mostly based on Punjabi, Rajasthani, Mughlai, Gujarati, Bengali, Udupi, and Tamil cuisines. This "mainstream" Indian cuisine was brought to the country by more recent immigrants and is termed as East Indian cuisine in Trinidad and Tobago, and is contrasted with the local Indo-Trinidadian and Tobagonian or local-Indian cuisine.

==== Breakfast ====
A traditional Indo-Trinidadian and Tobagonian breakfast consists of sada roti, a type of bread made with flour, baking powder and water. The dough is rolled out and cooked on flat, cast-iron skillet, called a tawa. The cooked sada is cut into quarters and served with a variety of fried vegetables, tarkaris or chokhas. Sometimes fried bake is eaten instead and is made using with flour, baking powder and yeast and is then fried in oil. Usually breakfast is vegetarian, however salt fish is sometimes added. Some breakfast dishes include baigan chokha (roasted and mashed eggplant), damadol chokha (roasted and mashed tomatoes), pepper chokha (roasted and mashed peppers), aloo chokha (boiled, roasted, and mashed potatoes), karaili chokha (roasted and mashed bittermelon), murtani or upar ghar (combination of roasted and mashed eggplant, tomato, pepper, and okra), fried or curried bodi (long beans), fried or curried aloo (potatoes), fried or curried ochro/bhindhi (okra), fried or curried seim (hyacinth beans), fried or curried karaili (bittermelon), pumpkin or kohra tarkari (pumpkin simmered with spices and seasoning), fried or curried saijan (drumstick), fried or curried lauki (bottle gourd), bhaji (made with young dasheen bush (taro) leaves, spinach leaves, saijan (drumstick) leaves, or chaurai (spiny amaranth) leaves), and/or fried plantains.

==== Street foods ====
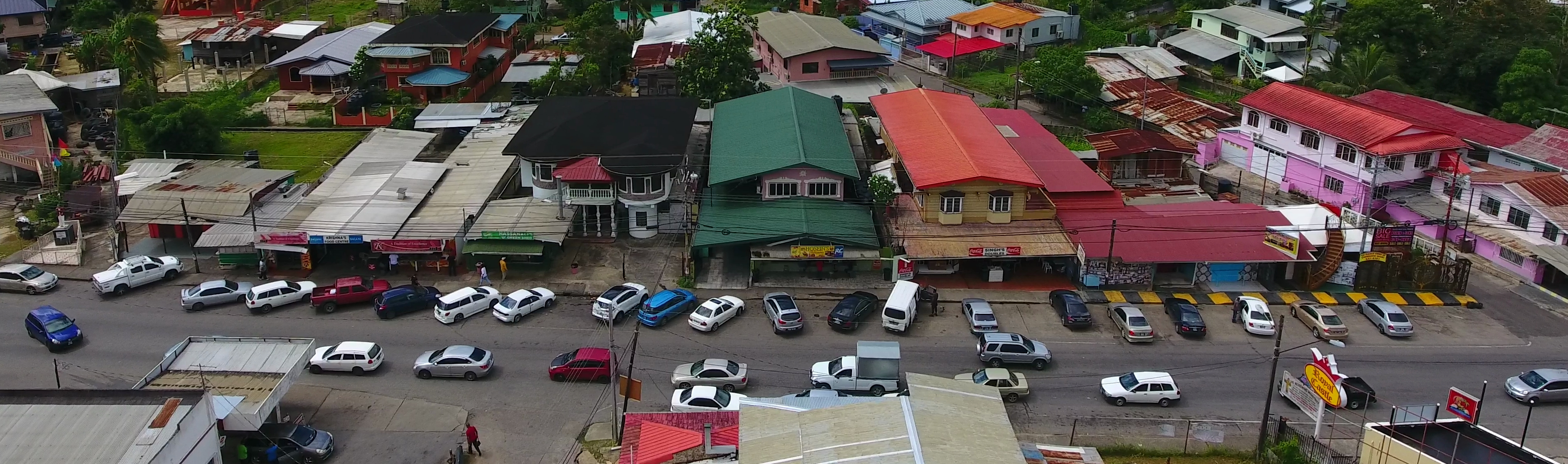
Food stalls in Debe

Indo-Trinidadian and Tobagonian foods like doubles, aloo pie, pholourie, saheena, baiganee, bara, and kachori are popular street foods throughout the country and are served with various chutneys, achars, and pepper sauce. Doubles is made with two baras (flat fried dough) and curried channa (chickpeas) and is served with toppings, like pepper sauce, kuchela, and tamarind, mango, pommecythere, cucumber, coconut and bandhaniya chutneys. It is one of the most popular breakfast foods eaten on the islands; however, it is eaten at any time throughout the day. Another Indo-Trinidadian and Tobagonian street food that is popular is roti, which consists of roti (usually paratha or dhalpuri) that wraps curried vegetables, curried channa (chickpeas) and aloo (potatoes), curried chicken, curried shrimp, curried goat, curried duck, curried conchs, or any other spicy fillings. The town of Debe in southern Trinidad is a popular destination for these street foods.

==== Festival foods ====
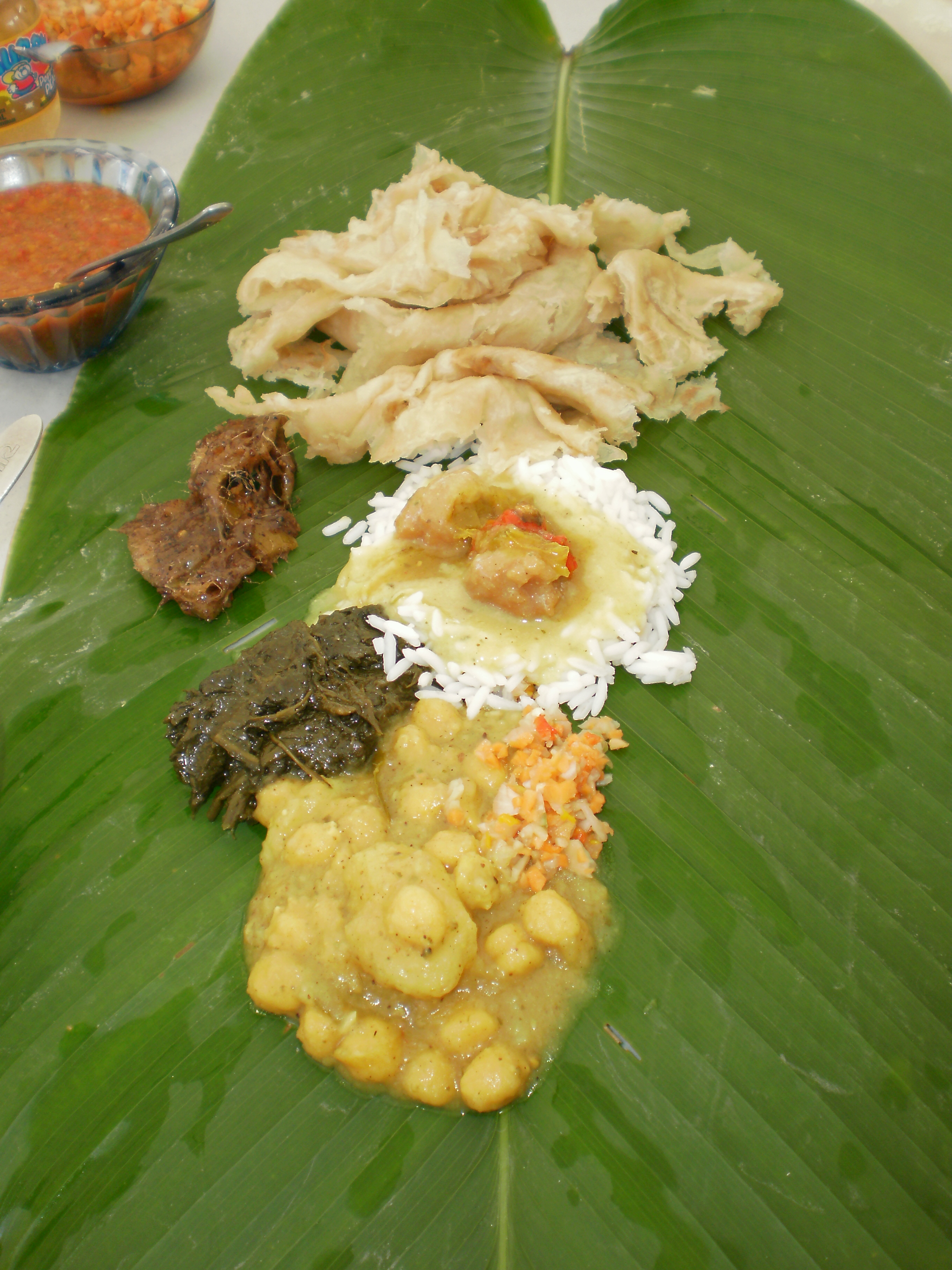
Diwali meal consisting of curry channa and aloo, curried mango, bhaji, karhi, rice and paratha.

Traditional Diwali and other Hindu festivals and prayers foods include appetizers such as pholourie, saheena, baiganee, bara, and kachori. Main dishes include roti (most commonly dalpuri and paratha) and karhi and rice served with condiments such as achar or anchar, kuchela, mother-in-law (pickled vegetables), pepper sauce, and dishes such as curried mango, bhaji (dasheen bush or any spinach), pumpkin or kohra tarkari (pumpkin), curry channa and aloo (chickpeas and potatoes), fried or curried baigan (eggplant), fried or curried bodi (long beans), fried or curried seim (hyacinth beans), curry eddoes (arui), curry chataigne or katahar (breadnut), and other tarkaries (vegetarian curries). Desserts include mohan bhog (parsad), lapsi and suhari, burfi, khurma, gulab jamun, pera, rasgulla, batasa, gujiya, gulgula, roat, kheer (sweet rice), laddu, and jalebi. It is traditionally served on a sohari (Calathea lutea) leaf.

Special Eid, Hosay, and other Muslim festival foods include curry goat, curry channa and aloo, sawine, burfi, rasgulla, sirnee, maleeda, and halwa.

==== Condiments ====
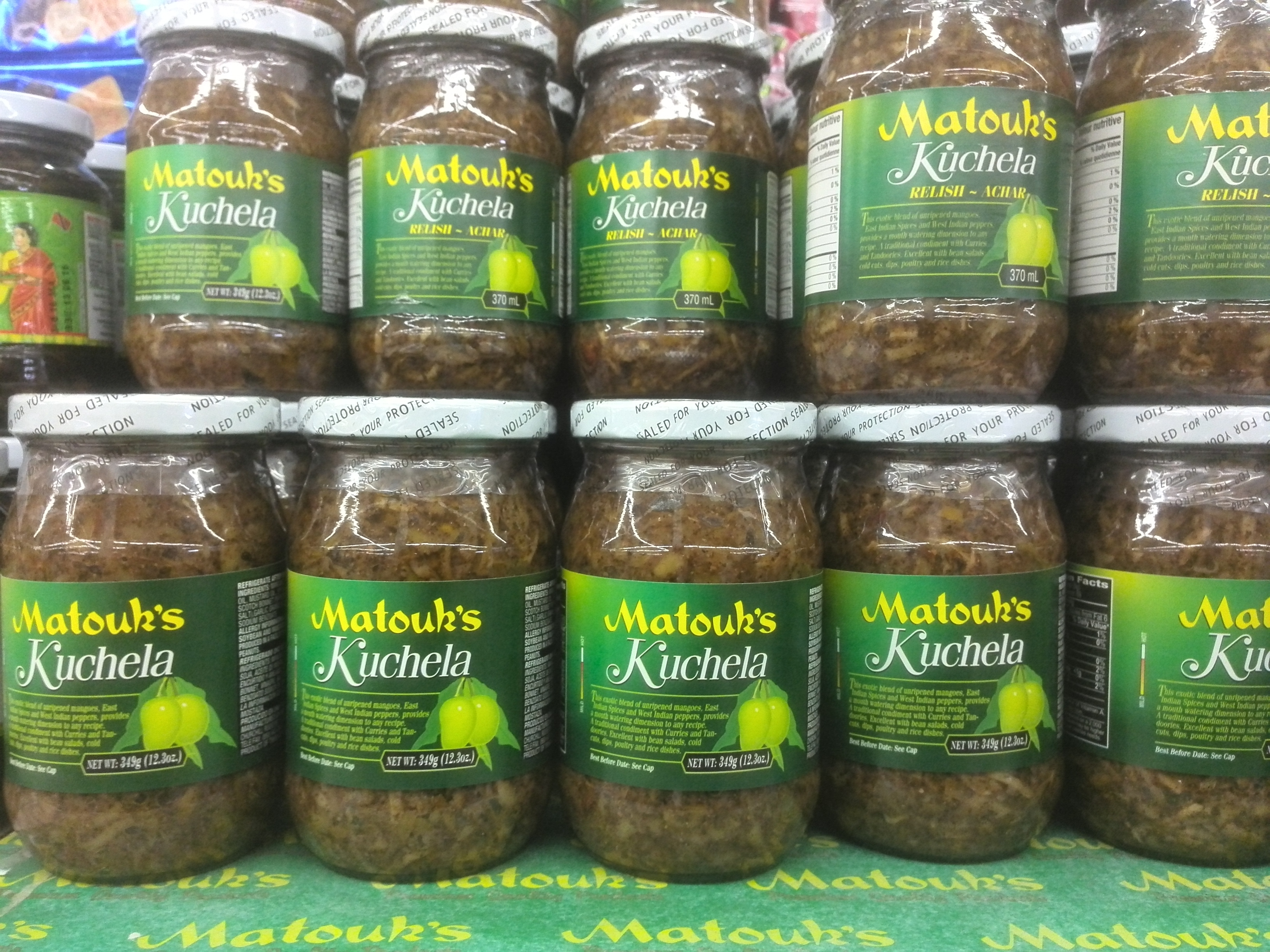
Kuchela jars in a supermarket.

Indo–Trinidadians and Tobagonians accompany their meals with various condiments; these can include pepper sauces, chutneys, and pickles and are often homemade.

Pepper sauces are made by using scotch bonnet or other hot peppers, either minced or chopped, and added to vinegar or lime or lemon juice and sometimes pickled together with carrots, sour cherries, bitter melon, or daikon (murai). Mother-in-law is another popular condiment, which is a coarsely chopped spicy medley of peppers, pimentos, carrots, bitter melon, and other spices.

Chutneys are popular as well and often include mango, tamarind, cucumber, pommecythère, bandhaniya, dhaniya, chalta, and coconut. They are most commonly eaten with doubles, aloo pie, saheena, baiganee, kachori, and pholourie. There are a variety of popular pickles known locally as achar or anchar which are commonly used. Kuchela a grated spicy version, usually made from mango but sometimes made from pommecythère, the mango version being most popular. Other version of achars are made from mango, pommecythère, tamarind, amla, lemon, lime, chayote, chalta, and green apple.

==== Sweets and desserts ====
Indian sweets and dessers are commonplace in Trinidad and Tobago and are distributed especially at Indian weddings and religious events. They include kheer (sweet rice or meetha bhat), sawine, khurma, gulab jamoon, burfi, roat, laddu, jalebi, halwa, mohan bhog (parsad), sirnee, lapsi and suhari, rasgula, tilly cake, gulgula, paynuse, pera, modak, gujiya, and batasa.

=== Dance ===
Indian dance forms are prevalent among Indo-Trinidadian and Tobagonians. Kathak, Odissi, and Bharatanatyam are the most popular Indian classical dance forms in Trinidad and Tobago. Indian folk dances, such as launda ke naach, Bollywood dancing, and chutney dancing are also popular Indian dance forms.

=== Theatre ===
Indian theatre is also popular throughout Trinidad and Tobago. Nautankis and dramas such as Raja Harishchandra, Raja Nal, Raja Rasalu, Sarwaneer (Sharwan Kumar), Indra Sabha, Bhakt Prahalad, Lorikayan, Gopichand, and Alha-Khand were brought by Indians to Trinidad and Tobago, however they had largely began to die out, till preservation began by Indian cultural groups. Ramleela, the drama about the life of the Hindu deity Rama, is largely popular throughout the country during the time between Sharad Navaratri and Vijayadashami leading up to Diwali, with almost each locale having their own celebration. The Ramlila celebrations end with the burning of an effigy of Ravana, the main antagonist of the ancient Ramayana and its 16th century vernacular variation, popular among Hindus in Trinidad and Tobago, the Ramcharitmanas. Rasleela (Krishnaleela), the drama about the life of the Hindu deity Krishna, is popular around the time of Krishna Janmashtami.

=== Influence on Trinidad and Tobago ===
The Indian–South Asian influence is very much noticeable in Trinidad and Tobago as they are the largest ethnic groups in the country. Mandirs, masijids, jhandis (Hindu prayer flags), Hindu schools, Muslim schools, roti shops and stalls, puja stores, Indian groceries/markets, and Indian clothing stores and expos dot the landscape of the country. Many businesses also bear names of Indian-South Asian origin. Many towns, settlements, villages, avenues, traces, and streets in Trinidad and Tobago are named after Indian cities and people, such as Calcutta Settlement, Madras Settlement, Delhi Settlement, Jai Ramkissoon Housing Settlement, Boodoosingh Village, Raghoo Village, Jaraysingh, Hasnalli, Hindustan Village, Patna Village, Gandhi Village, Kandahar Village, Cawnpore (Kanpur) Village, Nepal Village, Pahari Village, Abdul Village, Samaroo Village, Basta Hall, Gopaul Lands, Sumadh Gardens, Mohammed Ville, Gobin Village, Nancoo Village, Coromandel, Malabar, Matura (Mathura), Bangladesh, Morang Village, Poonah, Chandanagore (Chandinagar), Sadhoowa, Divali Nagar, Golconda, Barrackpore, and Fyzabad.

The holidays of Diwali, Eid al-Fitr, and Indian Arrival Day are national public holidays in Trinidad and Tobago. Trinidadian Hindustani and other South Asian languages has had a great influence on the Trinidadian English lingua franca. Most people of South Asian descent in Trinidad and Tobago also speak a unique Hinglish macaronic dialect of Trinidadian English and Trinidadian Hindustani and they incorporate more Hindustani vocabulary into their Trinidadian English dialect than other ethnic groups in the country. Trinidad Hindustani itself is a dying language in Trinidad; as auf 2003, there were only about 1,600 native speakers; another 14,000 spoke it as a second language.

Many indentured labourers taken from British India came from marginalised and lower-caste backgrounds, including a significant number from the Chamar caste. Facing entrenched discrimination, poverty, and limited opportunities in India, they were often drawn by misleading promises of better livelihoods abroad. As a result, they formed an important yet frequently overlooked segment of the indentured workforce in Trinidad and Tobago.

== Politics ==
Indo-Trinidadian and Tobagonian Political Leaders

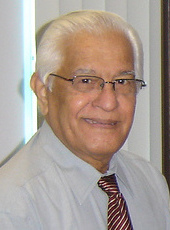
Basdeo Panday

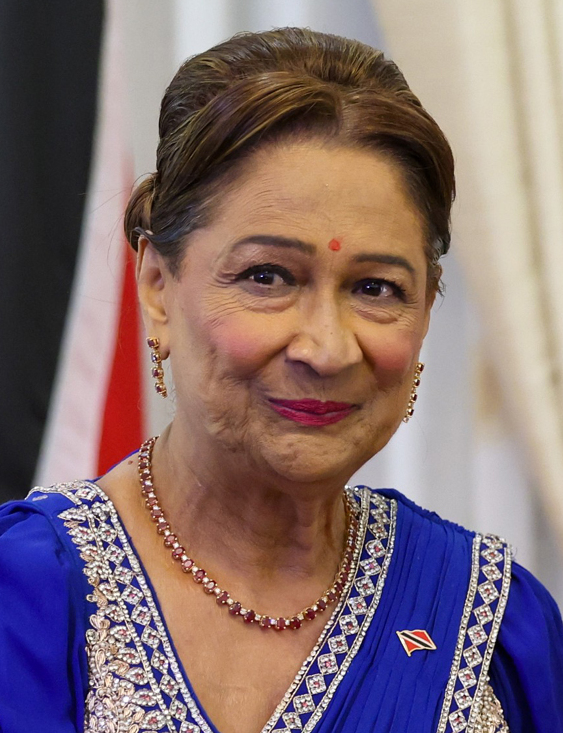
Kamla Persad-Bissessar

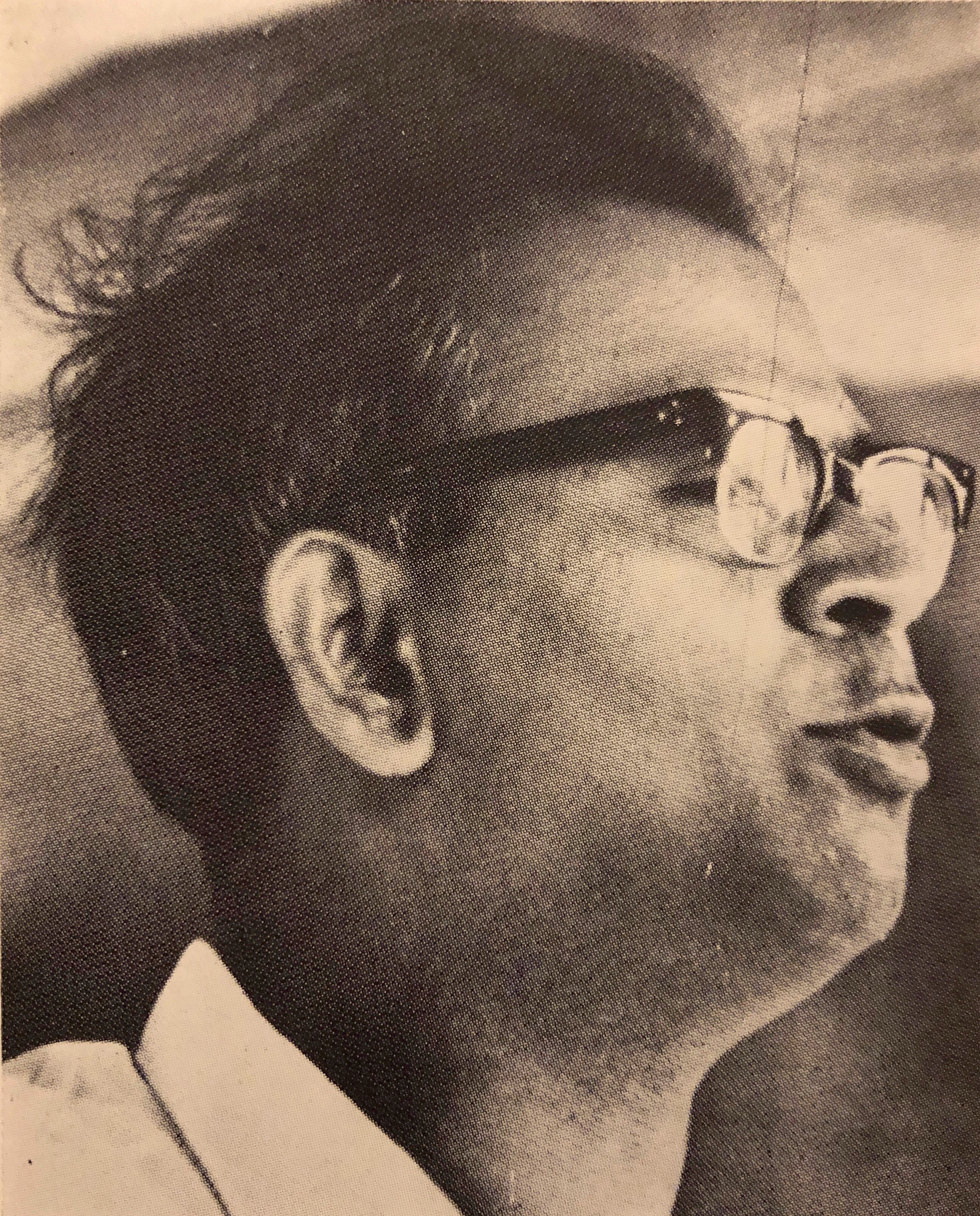
Rudranath Capildeo

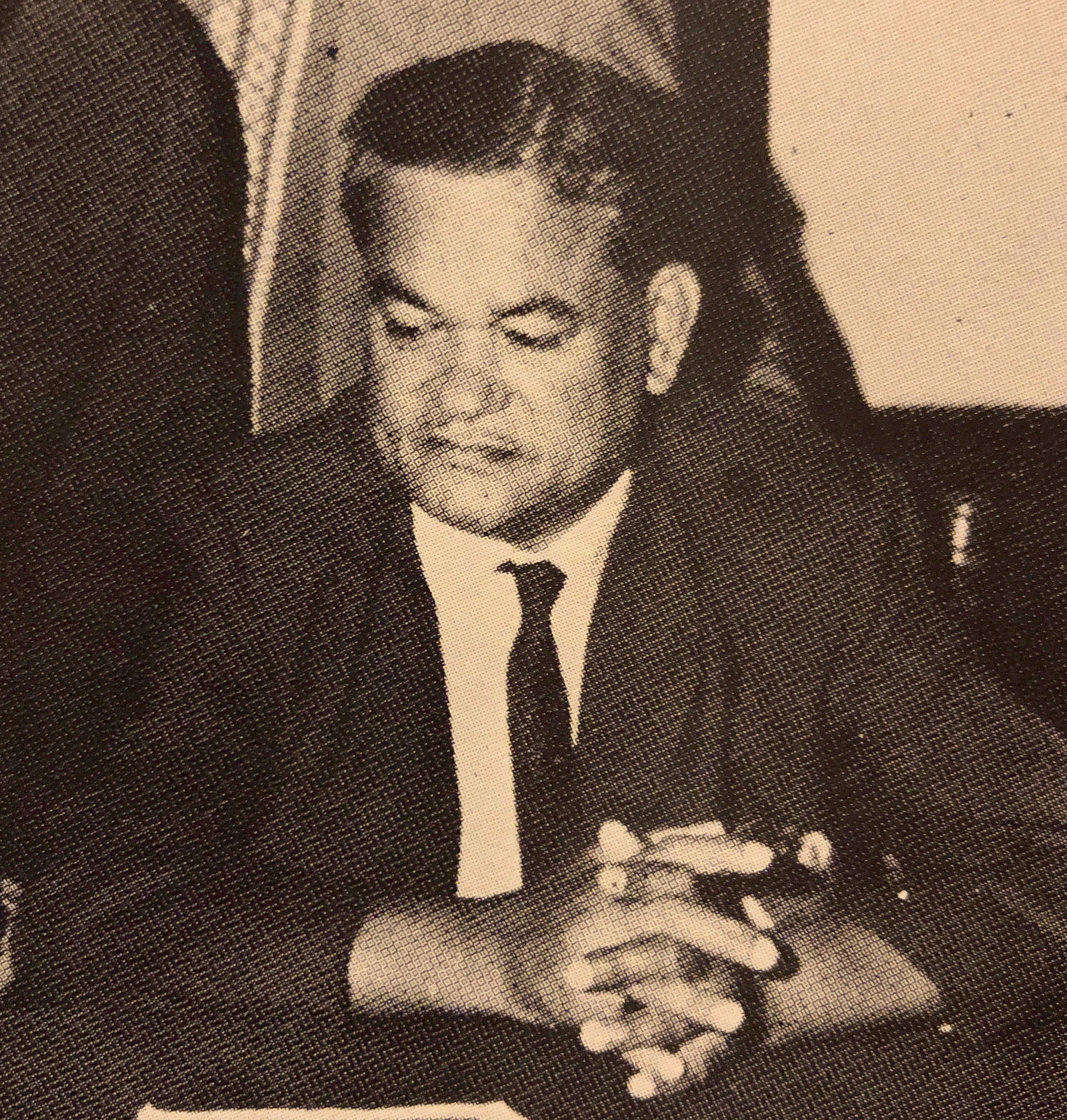
Bhadase Sagan Maraj

Most Indo-Trinidadians have traditionally given their political support to parties that opposed the People's National Movement (PNM) which has historically been perceived as a Christian Afro-Trinidadian dominated party. Voting patterns among Indo-Trinidadians have also been influenced by religion. At times, non-Presbyterian Christian and Muslim Indo-Trinidadians have shown major support for the PNM due to concerns about the Indo-majority led political parties such as PDP, DLP, and ULF that were felt to be Hindu and Presbyterian Indo-Trinidadian dominated parties. With the advent of the NAR and then the UNC this polarization by religion has been on the decline however its existence is still felt with the UNC fielding a Muslim candidate in every election for the San Juan/Barataria seat since 1995 owing to the presence of a large Indo-Trinidadian Muslim population within this constituency.

== Religion ==
Religion of Indo–Trinidadians and Tobagonians
Religion	Census 1921 (Note: Percentages add up to more than 100% because many converts to Christianity answered twice as they still identified with their former religions of Hinduism, Islam, Buddhism, or Zoroastrianism)		Census 1931		Census 1970		Census 2000		Census 2011	
Religion	Number	%	Number	%	Number	%	Number	%	Number	%
Hinduism	99,564	82	94,125	67.88	228,758	61.24	245,459	55.00	232,104	49.54
Islam	19,427	16	20,747	14.96	57,105	15.29	57,042	12.78	54,543	11.64
Presbyterianism	6,071	5	10,335	7.45	34,844	9.33	31,277	7.00	26,631	5.68
Roman Catholicism	4,857	4	8,469	6.11	33,312	8.92	31,823	7.13	30,350	6.48
Anglicanism	2,428	2	3,946	2.85	6,192	1.66	3,035	0.68	2,637	0.56
Other Christian denominations	-	-	433	0.31	191	0.05	34,491	7.73	58,782	12.55
Zoroastrianism	607	0.5	278	0.2	-	-	-	-	-	-
Buddhism	364	0.3	119	0.09	-	-	-	-	-	-
Sikhism	-	-	-	-	-	-	-	-	300	0.06
Trinidad Orisha	-	-	-	-	-	-	-	-	1,466	0.31
Rastafari	-	-	-	-	-	-	-	-	97	0.02
Other	-	-	215	0.16	13,136	3.52	35,540	7.96	27,210	5.81
Not Stated	-	-	-	-	-	-	3,498	0.78	29,518	6.30
None	-	-	-	-	-	-	4,108	0.92	4,887	1.04
Total	121,420		138,667		373,538		446,273		468,524	

Religious Makeup of Indo-Trinidadians (2011)
1. Hinduism 49.54 (44.6%)
2. Christianity 36.54 (32.9%)
3. Islam 11.64 (10.5%)
4. Not Stated 6.3 (5.68%)
5. Other 5.87 (5.29%)
6. None 1.05 (0.95%)
7. Sikhism 0.06 (0.05%)

According to the most recent census (2011) conducted in Trinidad and Tobago, Hinduism is the religion followed by a plurality of Indo-Trinidadians. The breakdown of religious affiliation for Indo-Trinidadians is as follows -

1. Hinduism – 49.54%
2. Islam – 11.64%
3. Pentecostalism/Evangelicalism/Full Gospel – 9.67%
4. Roman Catholicism – 6.48%
5. Not Stated – 6.30%
6. Other – 5.81%
7. Presbyterianism/Congregationalism – 5.68%
8. None – 1.04%
9. Spiritual Baptist – 0.96%
10. Seventh-day Adventist Church – 0.91%
11. Jehovah's Witnesses – 0.73%
12. Anglicanism – 0.56%
13. Trinidad Orisha – 0.31%
14. Other Baptists – 0.21%
15. Sikhism – 0.06%
16. Methodism – 0.05%
17. Rastafari – 0.02%
18. Moravian Church – 0.007%

Hindus in Trinidad and Tobago are represented by several sects, organizations and entities the largest of which is the Sanatan Dharma Maha Sabha, a Sanātanī Hindu organization with Ramanandi, Smarta, Shaiva, and Shaktist roots. Other Hindu organizations and sects include SWAHA International, Arya Samaj, Chinmaya Mission, Kabir panth, ISKCON, the Sathya Sai Baba movement, Seunariani (Sieunarini/Siewnaraini/Shiv Narayani), Aughar (Aghor/Owghur), Kali Mai (Madrasi), Murugan (Kaumaram), Bharat Sevashram Sangha, Jagadguru Kripalu Parishat (Radha Madhav), Ganapathi Sachchidananda movement, Divine Life Society, Brahma Kumaris, and Blue Star.

A majority of Indo-Trinidadian and Tobagonian Muslims are Sunni, however,there are notable Shia and Ahmadiyya minorities. The major Muslim organisation representing Muslims in Trinidad and Tobago is the Anjuman Sunnat-ul-Jamaat Association (ASJA). Other Islamic organizations include the Trinidad Muslim League, Darul Uloom, Ummah T&T, the Muslim Federation, and the Tackveeyatul Islamic Association.

The Sikh community in Trinidad and Tobago, numbering at about 300, consists of the descendants of the few Punjabis who came during the indentureship period, Punjabi Sikhs who came in the twentieth and twenty-first century, and Sindhi Hindus and Punjabi Hindus who also came in the twentieth and twenty-first century and who are, in addition to being Hindu, Nanakpanthis, followers of the Sikh Guru Nanak. The Sikhs have a gurdwara (temple) in Tunapuna dating back to 1929.

=== Caste ===
Although the Girmit system subjected all labourers, regardless of caste, to harsh and exploitative conditions, migration nonetheless offered many Chamars and other oppressed groups an opportunity to escape rigid caste hierarchies. Over time, they established new communities across the globe, reshaping social identities and forging resilience in the diaspora.

== See also ==
- Anglo-Indians
- Awadhi people
- Bengalis
- Bhojpuri people
- Bihari-U.P. diaspora
- Chindians
- Chutney music
- Chutney parang
- Chutney soca
- Dougla people
- History of Trinidad and Tobago
- India–Trinidad and Tobago relations
- Indian Arrival Day
- Indian indenture system
- Indo-Caribbean
- Indo-Caribbean music
- Indo-Guyanese
- Indo-Surinamese
- Pashtuns
- Pichakaree
- Soca music
- Tamil people
- Telugu people
