= IeTV =

Cable television channel in Trinidad and Tobago

Inspirational Exciting Television (ieTV )
- Former ieTV Logo
- Country: Trinidad and Tobago
- Broadcast area: Trinidad and Tobago
- Affiliates: ieRADIO
- Headquarters: Chandrahari Building, 9 Todd Street, El Socorro, San Juan, San Juan–Laventille, Trinidad and Tobago

Programming
- Languages: Trinidadian and Tobagonian English, Trinidadian Hindustani, Modern Standard Hindi, Sanskrit
- Picture format: 1080p (HDTV)

Ownership
- Owner: SWAHA Media Limited (2017-present); VA Films (2005-2017)
- Key people: Pt. Maniedeo Persad

History
- Former names: Indian Entertainment Television

Links
- Website: https://www.ietvtt.com/

Availability

Streaming media
- YouTube: ieTV
- Facebook: ieTV Trinidad & Tobago
- Instagram: ieTV Trinidad & Tobago
- Tego TV: ieTV

Inspirational Exciting Television (shortened to ieTV or internationally as ieTVTT; formerly Indian Entertainment Television) is a cable television station in Trinidad and Tobago and was the first Indo-Trinidadian and Tobagonian cable station in the country. Since the acquisition of the channel, the channel has been run under SWAHA Media Limited and broadcasts Indian cultural programming, news, current affairs and religious programming.

== Availability ==
It is carried on channel 113 on the Flow cable system in Trinidad. Channel 116 on Blink, TSTT's IPTV service and online using Ustream.

== Programming ==
The station's programming consists of a mix of local Indo-Trinidadian and Tobagonian programming and Indian programming from India. Programming includes SWAHA International Inc.’s Hindu services and events, singing and dancing shows, cooking shows, health shows, documentaries, kids and youth programming, talk shows, sportscasts, Islamic programs, Indian movies, and business shows. Newscasts are broadcast at 7.00am, 12.00pm, 6.30pm, and 9.30pm on weekdays and 6:30pm on Saturdays and Sundays.
