= Aloo pie =

Trinidadian fast food dish

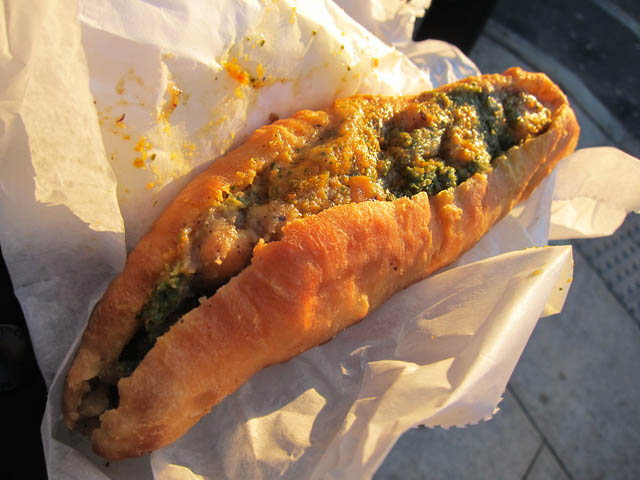
- Aloo pie
- Type: fried dumpling
- Place of origin: Trinidad and Tobago
- Region or state: Caribbean
- Associated cuisine: Indo-Caribbean cuisine
- Main ingredients: dough, potatoes, spices, peppers, chickpea curry (optional)
- Variations: various toppings and spices

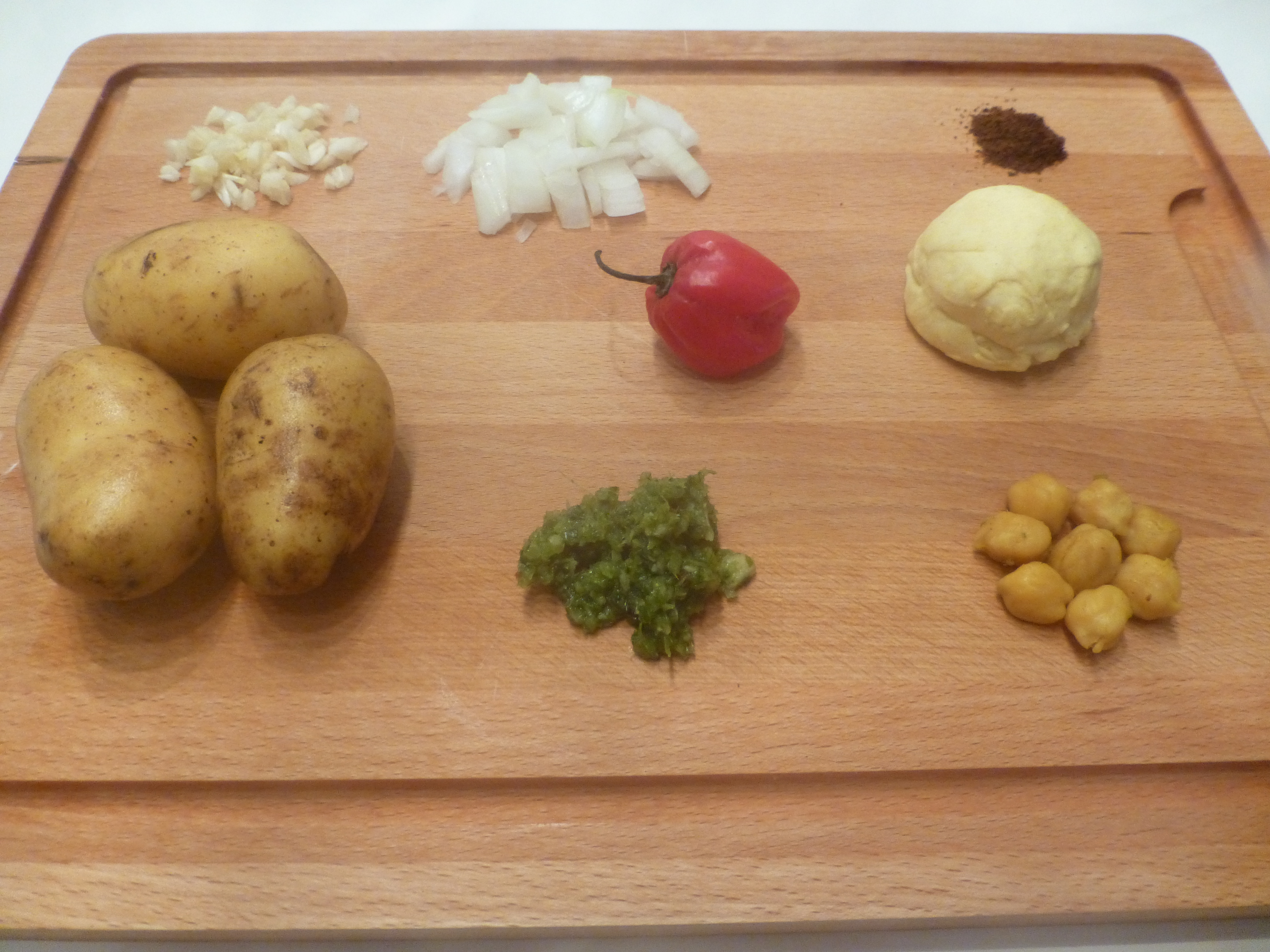
Ingredients

An aloo pie is a Caribbean fast food dish common in Trinidad and Tobago and is of Indo-Trinidadian origin. It is a pastry filled with seasoned mashed potatoes and then fried. It is similar to a samosa, but at 10–15 centimetres (4–6 in) in length it is significantly larger, and it does not have a triangular basic shape, instead resembling a Cornish pasty. The dough consists of flour, water, salt, baking powder and if necessary some saffron for the color. Seasonings and ingredients used in the mashed potatoes include salt, pepper, onion, cumin, and garlic, and occasionally green seasoning and long coriander (chadon beni). As a rule, the dumplings are cut open before serving and garnished with a curry based on chickpeas or green peas. It is seasoned with a chutney (usually based on tamarind or mango), chadon beni and a spicy pepper sauce.

Aloo is a Hindi word meaning potato. Trinidad was a British colony from 1797 to 1962, so English is spoken there. After the abolition of slavery in Trinidad, numerous Indians were recruited from 1845 as cheap labor for the plantations, who in turn introduced curries that were often vegetarian and sometimes contained potatoes. The pies are sold in snack bars, but also in bakeries and cafeterias in Trinidad. On the street, aloo pies are often sold by vendors who also sell doubles, since both dishes are fried and can therefore be made with the same appliance.
