= Acts Retirement-Life Communities =

Not-for-profit operator

- Company type: Not-for-profit
- Industry: Health care
- Headquarters: Fort Washington, Pennsylvania, U.S.
- Key people: Gerald T. Grant, CEO; Karen Christiansen, President
- Number of employees: 8,500+
- Website: actsretirement.org
- Footnotes / references 10,500+ residents

Acts Retirement-Life Communities (Acts), based out of Fort Washington, Pennsylvania, is the third largest not-for-profit owner, operator and developer of continuing care retirement communities (CCRCs) in the United States. Acts Life Care® communities provide independent living residences for people age 62 and above, with access to assisted living and skilled nursing care services, usually on the same campus.

== History ==
Acts began in the early 1970s, when a suburban Philadelphia pastor and members of the Church of the Open Door, a nondenominational church, sought a new and better way of living for the retired church members. Fulfilling instruction of the Scriptures, their idea was to provide a fulfilling and meaningful independent living lifestyle with a quality skilled health care environment that would be available if ever needed. Using their own resources, this group built the first part of what today is known as Fort Washington Estates, which opened in 1972.

As of 2025, Acts provides housing and services to more than 10,500 seniors through its family of 28 senior living communities in nine states, and employs more than 8,500 people.

== Organization ==
Acts is divided into four regions:

- Northeast - includes Pennsylvania with eight campuses
- Mid-Atlantic - includes Delaware, New Jersey, and Maryland with eight campuses
- Mid-South - includes Alabama, Georgia, North and South Carolina with six campuses
- Southeast - includes Florida and Alabama with six campuses

== Locations ==
=== Alabama ===
- Magnolia Trace, Huntsville
- Westminster Village, Spanish Fort

=== Delaware ===
- Country House, Greenville
- Manor House, Seaford
- Cokesbury Village, Hockessin

=== Florida ===
- Azalea Trace, Pensacola
- Edgewater Pointe Estates, Boca Raton
- Indian River Estates, Vero Beach
- St. Andrews Estates, Boca Raton
- The Terraces, Bonita Springs
- Mease Life, Dunedin

=== Georgia ===
- Lanier Village Estates, Gainesville

=== Maryland ===
- Heron Point, Chestertown
- Bayleigh Chase, Easton
- Buckingham's Choice, Adamstown
- Fairhaven, Sykesville

=== New Jersey ===
- The Evergreens, Moorestown

=== North Carolina ===
- Matthews Glen, Matthews
- Tryon Estates, Columbus

=== South Carolina ===
- Park Pointe Village, Rock Hill

=== Pennsylvania ===
- Brittany Pointe Estates, Lansdale
- Fort Washington Estates, Fort Washington
- Granite Farms Estates, Media
- Gwynedd Estates, Ambler
- Lima Estates, Media
- Normandy Farms Estates, Blue Bell
- Southampton Estates, Southampton
- Spring House Estates, Lower Gwynedd
