= The Parliament Channel (Trinidad and Tobago) =

Legislative broadcaster of Trinidad and Tobago

The Parliament Channel - Trinidad and Tobago (The Parliament Channel)
- Current Parliament Channel Logo
- Country: Trinidad and Tobago
- Broadcast area: Columbus subscribers in Trinidad
- Affiliates: The Parliament of Trinidad and Tobago, The Trinidad and Tobago Government
- Headquarters: The Red House, Port of Spain, Trinidad and Tobago

Programming
- Language: English
- Picture format: 480i (SDTV)

Ownership
- Owner: The Parliament of Trinidad and Tobago

Links
- Website: http://www.ttparliament.org/broadcasts.php?mid=7

Availability

Streaming media
- Windows Media Player: http://parlview.ttparliament.org/xrender

The Parliament Channel is a cable television station in Trinidad and Tobago which broadcasts on cable channel 11. It broadcasts proceedings of the Parliament of Trinidad and Tobago. Its headquarters are located at Parliamentary Complex, Cabildo Building, St. Vincent Street, Port-of-Spain, Trinidad.

== History ==
Former Parliament Channel logo

The station began operation on a test basis on August 18, 2006. The idea of broadcasting parliamentary proceedings was first cited by then Opposition Senator Roi Kwabena at a panel discussion during a heated debate with the then Government Senator Camille Robinson-Regis on the topic: "Television Media Coverage and Parliament" chaired by a British MP delegate at the Commonwealth Parliamentary Association's Conference held at the Hilton Hotel in 1993. It was again suggested by the Independent Senators in 2005.

== Availability ==
The live debates air on Channel 11 (Flow). In November 2007, the Parliament began airing its proceedings via FM Radio on the frequency 105.5 FM. This frequency is available in Trinidad and Tobago. The Parliament Channel also broadcasts over free to air television (Channel 29) allowing more citizens the ability to witness proceedings of the Senate, House of Representatives, and Committees. Live debates are also carried on the Parliament's YouTube Channel, ParlView.
