= Synergy TV =

Television channel in Trinidad and Tobago

Synergy Television (Synergy TV)
- Current Synergy TV logo
- Country: Trinidad and Tobago
- Broadcast area: Trinidad and Tobago
- Affiliates: CIN (Caribbean International Network)
- Headquarters: 19 Ariapita Avenue, Port of Spain, Trinidad and Tobago

Programming
- Language: English

Ownership
- Key people: Peter C. Lewis

Links
- Website: https://www.facebook.com/UBeSynergy

Availability

Terrestrial
- 33

Synergy Television (Synergy TV) is the first music oriented channel, serving Trinidad and Tobago. The channel was founded by Peter C. Lewis former Xtatik band member and host of the highly popular Pete's Picks which also airs on Synergy TV. The channel airs music videos of local and regional artists. It showcases many local entertainers as well as local designers and events. It is available on Channel 15 on the Flow Trinidad cable service in Trinidad. Its headquarters are located at 19 Ariapita Ave, Port of Spain, Trinidad and Tobago.

== History ==
The first Synergy TV logo, used until 2011

Synergy TV was launched on Cable Channel 28 in March 2003. The Purpose of the channel was to showcase locally based programming. The station's logo changed in 2011.

== Programming ==
The station airs mostly music videos of local and Caribbean artists and locally based programmes such as De Scene, Synergy TV Soca Star, Synergy Nights LIVE, Roll Call, Dynasty Chutney, Concert Series, I Love My Ride, Pete's Picks, Friday Nights Live, Soca Acts, Synergy Sports, Synergy TV Supermodel, Entertainment News, Karry Yuh Key, Chutney Island, Wrap Up, Synergy Sundays, Synergy Chutney Star and Yuh Done Kno.

== Network Slogans ==
- Bringing Cultures Together (2003–2011)
- LIFE, ENERGY, SYNERGY (2011–present)
