= ASJA Boys' College =

ASJA Boys College
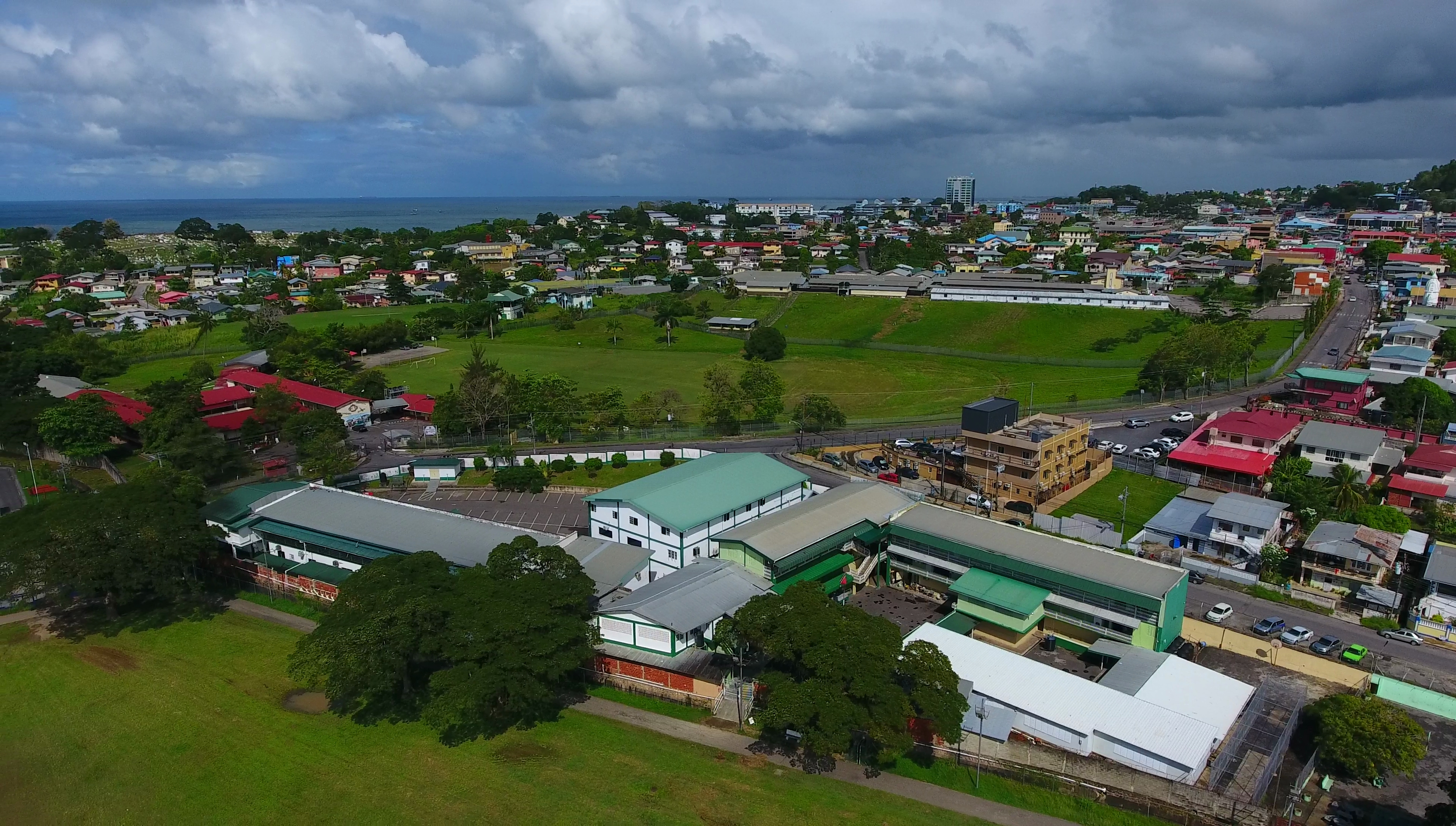
- ASJA Boys' College (right)

Location
- 19-21 Park Street; San Fernando; Trinidad and Tobago; 10.546960°N 61.417801°W

Information
- Type: Secondary school
- Motto: Strive to Excel
- Religious affiliation: Islam
- Established: 1960
- School district: Victoria West
- Oversight: Anjuman Sunnat-ul-Jamaat Association
- School code: 160001
- Principal: Alim S. Ali
- Staff: 30+
- Gender: Male
- Age range: 12-18
- Enrolment: 600+
- Average class size: 38
- Classrooms: 19
- Colour: Green
- Website: asjaboys.edu.tt

ASJA Boys' College is a Muslim secondary school in San Fernando, Trinidad and Tobago. It was founded in 1960 by the Anjuman Sunnat ul Jamaat Association (ASJA), a Muslim organization that operates mosques and schools in Trinidad.

== Facilities ==
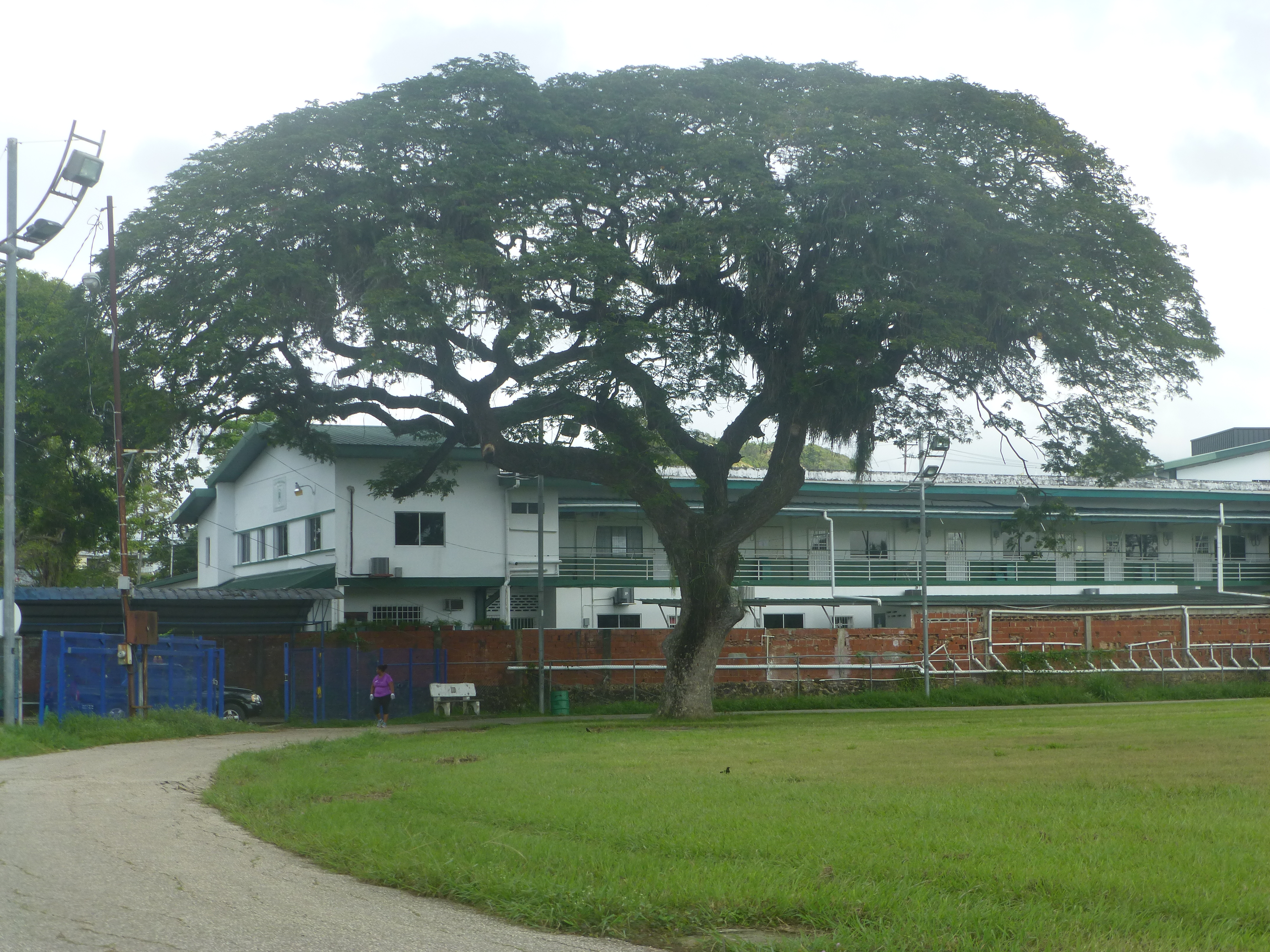
ASJA Boys' College seen from Skinner Park

Facilities at this institution includes:

- Information Technology Laboratory
- Biology/Physics Laboratory
- Chemistry Laboratory
- Art Room
- Mosque
- Auditorium
- Cricket Practice Area
- Basketball Court
- Volleyball Court
- Library
