= The Islamic Network =

TV station

The Islamic Network (T.I.N.)
- Current Darut Tarbiyah The Islamic Network (T.I.N.)logo
- Country: Trinidad and Tobago
- Broadcast area: National
- Headquarters: Darut Tarbiyah Drive, Ramgoolie Trace North, Cunupia, Trinidad and Tobago

Programming
- Language: English
- Picture format: 480i (SDTV)

Ownership
- Owner: Darut Tarbiyah

History
- Launched: 2006

Links
- Website: http://www.theislamicnetwork.org/

Availability

Terrestrial
- Not Available: Not Available

Streaming media
- JW Player: http://www.theislamicnetwork.org/

The Islamic Network (T.I.N.) is a local cable television station in Trinidad and Tobago broadcasting Islamic programming. The station is carried on Channel 96 or 116 on the Flow Trinidad cable system.

Its competitor is IBN. In 2012, a rift between members of the channel and IBN host Inshan Ishmael began. They were making plans to withdraw his program Breaking Barriers from the channel in order to air TIN content instead.
