= Tobago Channel 5 =

Television channel in Tobago, Trinidad and Tobago

- Country: Trinidad and Tobago
- Broadcast area: Cable subscribers in Tobago
- Affiliates: Trico Industries Limited
- Headquarters: 65-67 Lambeau, Signal Hill Road, Signal Hill, Tobago, Trinidad and Tobago

Programming
- Language(s): English

Ownership
- Owner: Trico Industries Limited

Links
- Website: http://www.tobagochannel5.com/

Availability

Streaming media
- Facebook Live: https://www.facebook.com/tobagochannel5/

Tobago Channel 5 is a community television station originating from the island of Tobago in Trinidad and Tobago. The station primarily broadcasts programming on Tobago, Tobago's news, Tobago's people, Tobago's culture and Tobago's perspective on national issues.

Tobago Channel 5 is one of two local television station in Tobago the other being the Tobago Inspirational Network (TIN). Its studios are located at 65-67 Lambeau, Signal Hill Road, Signal Hill, Tobago, Trinidad and Tobago. The station is carried on channel 5 on Trico Industries Limited and a live stream of their programmes is available on their website. Tobago Channel 5's original programming include programs such as Campout, Channel 5 News, Rise & Shine, Total Lockdown, Sports Talk, Half Time Show, Your Point Of View, High 5 and Jamboree.

== Website ==
Tobago Channel 5 officially launched its website on July 1, 2009. The website provides a live stream of the station's programming and has information on Tobago's news and current affairs.

== Personalities ==
- Ayana Carter - Channel 5 News
- Brother B - Rise and Shine
- Christo Gift (SC) - Hi 5 Reloaded
- Gerry McFarlane - Spot On

== Network slogans ==
- Building a stronger community, ...strengthening our nation (2002–present)
