= Anjuman Sunnat-ul-Jamaat Association =

Trinidad and Tobago religious organisation

- Abbreviation: ASJA
- Formation: 1936
- Headquarters: 2-4 Queen Street; Port of Spain; Trinidad and Tobago

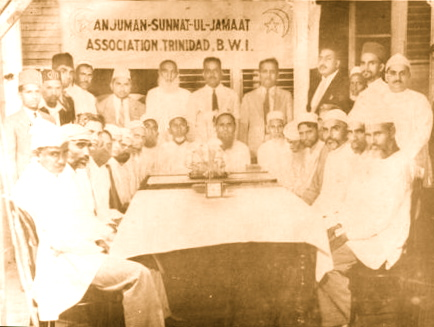
ASJA members (1936)

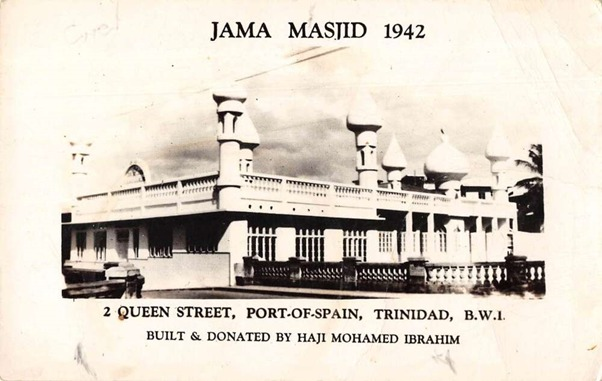
Historical view of the ASJA headquarter in Port of Spain (1942)

The Anjuman Sunnat-ul-Jamaat Association (ASJA) is the largest Muslim organisation of Trinidad and Tobago. More than 80% of the Trinidadian Muslim belongs to Anjuman Sunnatul jamaat association. It operates 53 mosques, 7 Primary School and 6 secondary schools. The members of this organization are Sunni Hanafi Muslim.

== See also ==
- ASJA Boys' College
- Islam in Trinidad and Tobago
