= Acts25 =

Television station in Trinidad and Tobago

Advance Community Television Station (ACTS25)
- Current ACTS25 logo
- Country: Trinidad and Tobago
- Broadcast area: National
- Headquarters: 53B, Circular Road, San Fernando, Trinidad and Tobago

Programming
- Language(s): English
- Picture format: 480i (SDTV)

Ownership
- Owner: Nelson Sammy-Guilarte
- Key people: Nelson Sammy-Guilarte; Keith Ferguson; Johanna Andrews; Rebekah Fuentes

History
- Launched: 15 August 2006

Links
- Website: www.actnvoice.com/index.html

Availability

Terrestrial
- 25

Advance Community Television Station (ACTS25) is a local television station in Trinidad and Tobago. It broadcasts on channel 25 on the UHF band and on 9 through Flow Trinidad's cable TV service. The station focuses on social and spiritual development, and it operates a 24‑hour schedule. The station's CEO & President is Reverend Nelson Sammy-Guilarte. The station's studios are located in 53B, Circular Road, San Fernando, Trinidad and Tobago.

== History ==
ACTS25 was officially launched on Tuesday 15 August 2006, although it has run a test transmission since 2005.

== Programming ==
ACTS25's programming line-up includes original, local and foreign content. The programming is based on The South Land, Family Values, Community Sports & Service and Inspirational / Christian Programming. Currently, the station is the home of Amateur Boxing. The station was the official carrier of the 2008 Olympic Boxing Qualifiers, which was held at the National Stadium. The current lineup includes Scoreboard, Bring De Riddim, Riddim on De Road, Your Health Your Choice, Youth Nation, 2 explosive expressions and Maximized Life.

Additionally, ACTS plays movies and religious programs and concerts whenever live/original programming is not being aired.

== Coverage ==
ACTS broadcasts on UHF channels 25 and 76 in Trinidad and Tobago. The station is also transmitted on Columbus Communications' Flow Cable TV service on Channel 9.

== Slogans ==
- 2006–Present: Shaping People to Change The World
