= Islamic Broadcast Network =

Cable television channel in Trinidad and Tobago

Islamic Broadcast Network (IBN)
- Current IBN logo
- Country: Trinidad and Tobago
- Broadcast area: National
- Headquarters: #61 Bamboo Main Road, Valsayn South, Trinidad and Tobago

Programming
- Language: English
- Picture format: 480i (SDTV)

Ownership
- Owner: IBN Communications Company Ltd
- Key people: Tanvir Kamal

History
- Launched: 28 October 2005

Links
- Website: http://www.ibntt.com/

The Islamic Broadcast Network (IBN) is a local cable television station in Trinidad and Tobago. The station is carried on Channel 8 on the Columbus cable system. The station's studios are located at Bamboo Main Road in Valsayn, and its CEO is Tanvir Kamal. Channel manager and host of Breaking Barriers Inshan Ishmael left in December 2014 after death threats were sent to his family.

== Programming ==
The station carries several hours of local programming daily. While it focuses on religious programming the station's schedule also includes a considerable amount of current affairs and community and lifestyle programming. Shows include Breaking Barriers and Point Blank.

== See also ==
- Islam in Trinidad and Tobago
