= State of emergency =

Government declaration for extraordinary power

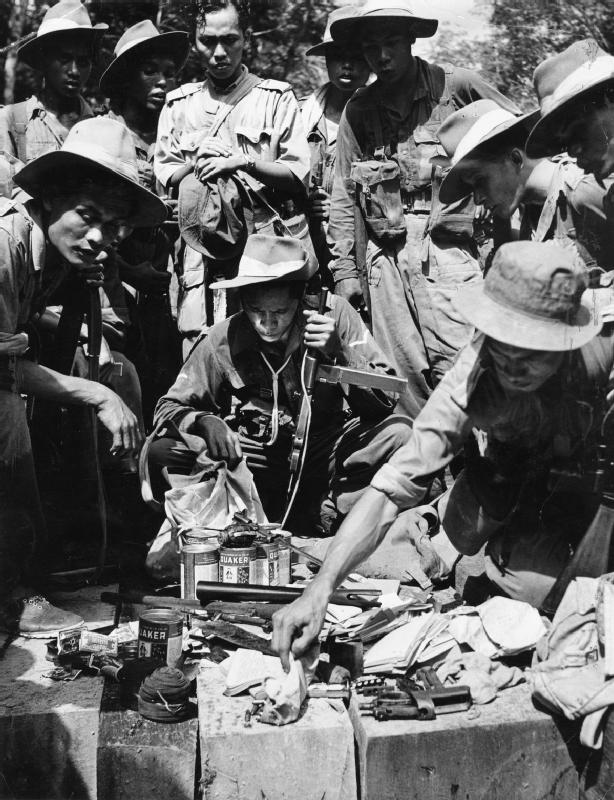
Members of the Royal Malay Regiment during the Malayan Emergency in 1949, inspecting equipment captured in a raid

A state of emergency is a situation in which a government is empowered to put through policies that it would normally not be permitted to do, for the safety and protection of its citizens. A government can declare such a state before, during, or after a natural disaster, civil unrest, armed conflict, medical pandemic or epidemic or other biosecurity risk.

== Relationship with international law ==
Under international law, rights and freedoms may be suspended during a state of emergency, depending on the severity of the emergency and a government's policies.

== Use and viewpoints ==
Democracies use states of emergency to manage a range of situations from extreme weather events to public order situations. Dictatorial regimes often declare a state of emergency that is prolonged indefinitely for the life of the regime, or for extended periods of time, so that derogations can be used to override human rights of their citizens, usually protected by the International Covenant on Civil and Political Rights (ICCPR). In some situations, martial law is also declared, allowing the military greater authority to act. In other situations, an emergency is not declared, and de facto measures are taken, or the government adopts a decree-law. Nicole Questiaux (France) and Leandro Despouy (Argentina), two consecutive United Nations Special Rapporteurs, have recommended to the international community to adopt the following "principles" to be observed during a state or de facto situation of emergency: Principles of Legality, Proclamation, Notification, Time Limitation, Exceptional Threat, Proportionality, Non-Discrimination, Compatibility, Concordance and Complementarity of the Various Norms of International Law (cf. "Question of Human Rights and State of Emergency", E/CN.4/Sub.2/1997/19, at Chapter II; see also état d'exception).

Article 4 to the ICCPR permits states to derogate from certain rights guaranteed by the ICCPR in "time of public emergency". Any measures derogating from obligations under the Covenant, however, must be to only the extent required by the exigencies of the situation, and must be announced by the State Party to the Secretary-General of the United Nations. The European Convention on Human Rights and American Convention on Human Rights have similar derogatory provisions. No derogation is permitted to the International Labour Conventions.

Some, such as political theorist and Nazi Party member Carl Schmitt, have argued that the power to decide whether to initiate a state of emergency defines sovereignty itself. In State of Exception (2005), Giorgio Agamben criticized this idea, arguing that the mechanism of the state of emergency deprives certain people of their civil and political rights, producing his interpretation of homo sacer.

The state of emergency can be used to overthrow an existing regime's constitution. One example was the August 1991 attempted coup in the Soviet Union (USSR) where the coup leaders invoked a state of emergency; the failure of the coup led to the dissolution of the Soviet Union.

Derogations by states having ratified or acceded to binding international agreements such as the ICCPR, the American and European Conventions on Human Rights and the International Labor Conventions are monitored by independent expert committees, regional Courts and other State Parties.

== Law in selected countries ==
=== Africa ===
==== Egypt ====
States of emergency in Egypt are governed by Law 1958/162. The law grants greater powers to the police, suspends some constitutional rights and legalizes media censorship and state detention of individuals, who may be tried before military courts created under emergency rule.

Since the proclamation of the republican system in 1953, Egyptians have lived under four successive periods of emergency rule lasting more than a year: 1956–1964, 1967–1980, 1981–2012 and 2017–2021. The emergency law received widespread criticism during the presidency of Hosni Mubarak, when thousands of civilians were detained under the law according to human rights groups, with estimates of political prisoners running as high as 30,000.

==== Ethiopia ====
Article 93 of the Constitution of Ethiopia provides for a six-month state of emergency under certain conditions.

==== Maldives ====
A state of emergency was declared on 26 December 2004, following the 2004 Indian Ocean Earthquake and Tsunami. The resulting tsunamis caused extensive damage to the country's infrastructure, cutting off communications in large swathes of the nation, decimating islands, and forcing the closure of several resorts.

On 5 February 2018, a state of emergency was declared by Maldives's President Abdulla Yameen for 15 days and ordered security forces into the Supreme Court of the Maldives and arrested former president Maumoon Abdul Gayoom and the Chief Justice of the Maldives.

==== Nigeria ====
In Nigeria, a state of emergency is usually declared during periods of major civil unrest. In recent years, it has specifically been implemented in reaction to terrorist attacks on Nigerians by the Islamic terrorist group Boko Haram.

On 14 May 2013, Goodluck Jonathan declared a state of emergency for the entire northeastern states of Borno, Yobe and Adamawa. A more limited state of emergency had been declared on 31 December 2011 in parts of Yobe, Borno, Plateau and Niger states. This earlier declaration included the temporary shutdown of the international borders in those regions.

On 26 November 2025, Nigerian President Bola Ahmed Tinubu declared a nationwide security emergency and ordered the military, police, and intelligence agencies to expand recruitment and immediately deploy thousands of additional personnel. He also urged the National Assembly to initiate a process of reforming state police forces to address the escalating wave of kidnappings and terrorist attacks across the country.

==== Sierra Leone ====
Sierra Leone declared, on 7 February 2019, a State of Emergency due to ongoing rape and sexual violence in the country. On 24 March 2020, a 12-month state of emergency was declared by (Rtd) Brigadier Julius Madaa Bio due to the COVID-19 pandemic.

==== South Africa ====
States of emergency in South Africa are governed by section 37 of the Constitution and by the State of Emergency Act, 1997. The president may declare a state of emergency only when "the life of the nation is threatened by war, invasion, general insurrection, disorder, natural disaster or other public emergency" and if the ordinary laws and government powers are not sufficient to restore peace and order. The declaration is made by proclamation in the Government Gazette and may only apply from the time of publication, not retroactively. It can only continue for 21 days unless the National Assembly grants an extension, which may be for up to 3 months at a time. The High Courts have the power, subject to confirmation by the Constitutional Court, to determine the validity of the declaration of a state of emergency.

During a state of emergency, the President of South Africa has the power to make emergency regulations "necessary or expedient" to restore peace and order and end the emergency. This power can be delegated to other authorities. Emergency measures can violate the Bill of Rights, but only to a limited extent. Some rights are inviolable, including, amongst others, the rights to life and to human dignity; the prohibition of discrimination on the grounds of race, sex, or religion; the prohibition of torture or inhumane punishment; and the right of accused people to a fair trial. The emergency must strictly require that any violation of a constitutional right occur. Emergency measures may not indemnify the government or individuals for illegal actions. They may impose criminal penalties, but not exceeding three years' imprisonment. They may not require military service beyond what is required by the ordinary laws governing the defence force. An emergency measure may be disapproved by the National Assembly, in which case it lapses, and no emergency measure may interfere with the elections, powers, or sittings of Parliament or the provincial legislatures. The courts have the power to determine the validity of any emergency measure.

The constitution places strict limits on any detention without trial during a state of emergency. A friend or family member of the detainee must be informed, and the name and place of detention must be published in the Government Gazette. The detainee must have access to a doctor and a legal representative. The detainee must be brought before a court within 10 days to determine whether the detention is necessary; if not released, the court may order repeated review every 10 days. At the court review, the detainee must be allowed legal representation and to appear in person. The provisions on detention without trial do not apply to prisoners of war in an international conflict; instead, they must be treated in accordance with the Geneva Conventions and other international law.

==== Zimbabwe ====
In Zimbabwe, the declaration of a state of disaster is regulated by Section 27 of the Civil Protection Act [Chapter 10:06].

=== Americas ===
==== Argentina ====
The Constitution of Argentina, which has been amended several times, has always allowed for a state of emergency (literally estado de sitio, "state of siege") to be declared if the constitution or the authorities it creates are endangered by internal unrest or foreign attack. This provision was much abused during dictatorships, with long-lasting states of siege giving the government a free hand to suppress opposition. The American Convention on Human Rights (Pacto de San José de Costa Rica), adopted in 1969 but ratified by Argentina only in 1984 immediately after the end of the National Reorganization Process, restricts abuse of the state of emergency by requiring any signatory nation declaring such a state to inform the other signatories of its circumstances and duration, and what rights are affected.

==== Brazil ====
The current constitution of Brazil allows the president to declare two states, to "preserve or establish peace and order, threatened by grave and imminent institutional instability or severe natural disasters". The first, and less severe state is the state of defense (estado de defesa), while a more severe form is the state of siege (estado de sítio).

==== Canada ====
The federal government of Canada can use the Emergencies Act to invoke a state of emergency. A national state of emergency automatically expires after 90 days, unless extended by the Governor-in-Council. There are different levels of emergencies: Public Welfare Emergency, Public Order Emergency, International Emergency, and War Emergency.

The Emergencies Act replaced the War Measures Act in 1988. The War Measures Act was invoked three times in Canadian history, most controversially by Prime Minister Pierre Trudeau during the 1970 October Crisis, and also by Prime Minister Robert Borden during World War I (from 1914 to 1920, against threat of Communism during the Revolutions of 1917–1923) and by Prime Minister William Lyon Mackenzie King during World War II (from 1942 to 1945, against perceived threat from Japanese Canadians following Imperial Japan's attack on Pearl Harbor).

Under the current Emergency Act, a state of emergency can also be declared by provincial, territorial, and municipal governments. In addition Canada's federal government and any of its provincial governments can suspend, for five years at a time, Charter rights to fundamental freedoms in section 2, to legal rights in sections 7 through 14, and to equality rights in section 15 by legislation which invokes the notwithstanding clause, section 33, and therefore emergency powers can effectively be created even without using the Emergency Act.

The Emergencies Act was first invoked by Prime Minister Justin Trudeau on 14 February 2022 in response to the Freedom Convoy 2022 protests that occupied the capital, Ottawa. The Canadian House of Commons voted to approve the invocation 185–151 with support from the Liberal Party and the New Democratic Party and opposition from the Conservative Party and the Bloc Québécois. Prime Minister Trudeau previously considered invoking it at the beginning of the COVID-19 pandemic in April 2020, but faced unanimous disapproval from all thirteen provincial and territorial premiers at the Council of the Federation.

==== Trinidad and Tobago ====
Sections 7 through 12 of the Constitution set out the legal basis for declaring that a state of emergency exists. The president, under the advice of the prime minister, may proclaim that a "state of public emergency" exists if:

- "A public emergency has arisen as a result of the imminence of a state of war between Trinidad and Tobago and a foreign state,
- A public emergency has arisen as a result of the occurrence of any earthquake, hurricane, flood, fire, outbreak of pestilence or of infectious disease, or other calamity whether similar to the foregoing or not,
- Action has been taken, or is immediately threatened, by any person, of such a nature and on so extensive a scale, as to be likely to endanger the public safety or to deprive the community or any substantial portion of the community of supplies or services essential to life." (ss. 8 (2)).

Upon declaring a state of emergency, the President may issue regulations to address the situation at hand. The regulations can even infringe upon the rights enshrined within sections 4 and 5 of the Constitution (e.g., freedom of speech, freedom of movement, etc.) but only to such extent as such constitutional encroachments are "reasonably justifiable for the purpose of dealing with the situation that exists during that period." (ss. 7 (3)). Once the President has declared a state of emergency, the initial duration of the proclamation is 15 days, unless revoked sooner. The state of emergency can then be extended for up to three months by a simple majority vote of the House of Representatives. It can be extended by a further three months by a three-fifths majority vote of the House of Representatives and must also be passed in the Senate.

A state of emergency was declared in 1970, during the Black Power Revolution, by then-Prime Minister Eric Williams. During the attempted state coup by the Jamaat al Muslimeen against the NAR government of the then Prime Minister A. N. R. Robinson in 1990, a state of emergency was declared during the coup attempt and for a period after the coup.

On 4 August 1995, a state of emergency was declared to remove the Speaker of the House Occah Seapaul by Prime Minister Patrick Manning during a constitutional crisis. The government had attempted to remove the speaker via a no-confidence motion, which failed. The state of emergency was used to remove the speaker using the emergency powers granted.

On 22 August 2011 at 8:00 pm, Prime Minister Kamla Persad-Bissessar announced a state of emergency in an attempt to crack down on the trafficking of illegal drugs and firearms, in addition to gangs. The decision of the President, George Maxwell Richards, to proclaim the state of emergency was debated in the country's Parliament as required by the Constitution on 2 September 2011 and passed by the required simple majority of the House of Representatives. On 4 September, the Parliament extended the state of emergency for a further three months. It ended in December 2011.

On 15 May 2021 at 2:50 pm, Prime Minister Keith Rowley declared a state of emergency following a mass surge in the number of deaths and COVID-19 infections, no hospital beds being available and a lack of COVID-19 vaccines in dealing with a rapid and deadly spread of the COVID-19 pandemic in Trinidad and Tobago, noted as being one of the worst in the world. On 24 August, the Parliament extended the state of emergency for a further three months.

On 30 December 2024, a state of emergency was declared after a spike in gang violence, which killed 6 people in the previous 2 days.

==== United States ====
The United States Constitution implicitly provides some emergency powers in the article about the executive power:

- Congress may authorize the government to call forth the militia to execute the laws, suppress an insurrection, or repel an invasion.
- Congress may authorize the government to suspend consideration of writs of habeas corpus "when in cases of rebellion or invasion the public safety may require it."
- Felony charges may be brought without presentment or grand jury indictment in cases arising "in the militia, when in actual service in time of war or public danger."
- A state government may engage in war without Congress's approval if "actually invaded, or in such imminent Danger as will not admit of delay."

Aside from these, many provisions of law exist in various jurisdictions, which take effect only upon an executive declaration of emergency; some 500 federal laws take effect upon a presidential declaration of emergency. The National Emergencies Act regulates this process at the federal level. It requires the President to identify the provisions activated specifically and to renew the declaration annually to prevent an arbitrarily broad or open-ended emergency. Presidents have occasionally taken action justified as necessary or prudent in a state of emergency, only to have it struck down in court as unconstitutional.

A state governor or local mayor may declare a state of emergency within their jurisdiction. This is common at the state level in response to natural disasters. The Federal Emergency Management Agency maintains a system of assets, personnel, and training to respond to such incidents. For example, on 10 December 2015, Washington state Governor Jay Inslee declared a state of emergency due to flooding and landslides caused by heavy rains.

The 1977 International Emergency Economic Powers Act allows the government to freeze assets, limit trade, and confiscate property in response to an "unusual and extraordinary threat" to the United States that originates substantially outside of it. As of 2015, more than twenty emergencies under the IEEPA remain active on various subjects, the oldest of which was declared in 1979 regarding the government of Iran. Another ongoing national emergency, declared after the September 11 attacks, authorizes the president to retain or reactivate military personnel beyond their normal term of service.

In 2020, it was common for states to enact a state of emergency due to the COVID-19 pandemic.

Because the Defense Resources Act contains numerous Titles or individual national emergency laws, it provides an important framework. In American film and popular culture, American views on what to expect during national emergencies can be shaped by prominent Cold War television programs such as The Day After, which aired on ABC in November 1983.

Officials under President Ronald Reagan briefed Congress on the Act in 1983. The briefing explained several emergency actions Congress might approve in a grave national crisis such as the nuclear war scare depicted in The Day After. Upon approval by Congress, the Act would have authorized the president to issue orders putting forth wage and price controls, censorship, and the commandeering of private property. The present legal status of these matters is not clear.

Presidential Emergency Action Documents reviews issues concerning national emergencies in the United States as well as legal and constitutional concerns.

In October 2025, officials in Los Angeles County announced a state of emergency due to the continuous federal crackdown on immigrants, aiming to offer financial support to this population. Many immigrants have experienced delays in their rent payments due to these crackdowns and have been denied rent assistance and other financial services. The Trump administration intensified its enforcement actions against immigrants in Los Angeles during the summer of 2025.

=== Asia ===
==== Brunei ====
The 1959 constitution allows the Sultan of Brunei to declare a state of emergency at the national or local level. The sultan may extend the state of emergency after two years or cancel it altogether.

Under emergency rule, the sultan can proclaim royal decrees, known as Orders, which have the force of law and can affect wide-ranging domains such as censorship, freedom of movement, finance, and modification of legislation. These Orders are then subject to review by the Legislative Council, which may promulgate them into law as Acts through the normal legislative process. New Orders from the sultan typically override some Acts.

The current state of emergency in Brunei predates its history as an independent state. It was declared by Sultan Omar Ali Saifuddien III on 12 December 1962 during the Brunei revolt against the then-British protectorate's planned inclusion in the federation of Malaysia. Because the rebellion came to be associated with derhaka (treachery against the Sultan) by the sultanate, it has not lifted the state of emergency nor has it reinstated the previously-elected Legislative Council, dissolved shortly after the proclamation of emergency rule. The state of emergency has also restricted many civil liberties.

==== Hong Kong (China) ====
During a state of war or turmoil which threatens national security or unity, and which the Standing Committee of the National People's Congress believes is beyond the control of the local government, the Standing Committee can invoke Article 18 of the Hong Kong Basic Law and declare a "State of Emergency" in Hong Kong; thus, the Central People's Government can selectively implement national laws not normally allowed in Hong Kong. Deployment of troops from the People's Liberation Army Hong Kong Garrison under the "Law of the People's Republic of China on Garrisoning the Hong Kong Special Administrative Region" can happen.

The Chief Executive of Hong Kong along with the Executive Council can prohibit public gatherings, issue curfew orders, prohibit the movement of vessels or aircraft, delegate authority, and other listed powers, under "Cap. 245 Public Order Ordinance".

Although the People's Liberation Army Hong Kong Garrison may not interfere in internal Hong Kong affairs, the Hong Kong Special Administrative Region Government may invoke Article 14 of the Hong Kong Basic Law and request permission of the Central People's Government to have the garrison assist in "maintenance of public order or disaster relief".

Since 1997, a State of Emergency has never been declared. However, emergency measures have been used to varying degrees over the years, both during British rule and after the establishment of the Special Administrative Region. A few notable mentions are as follows:

- Seamen's strike of 1922 – Enactment of the Emergency Regulations Ordinance, 1922 within one day on 28 February 1922
- Canton-Hong Kong strike 1925 – with involvement of police and soldiers from multiple nations
- Anti-Japanese riot of 1931 – with involvement of Hong Kong Police and British Armed Forces
- Hong Kong 1956 riots – with involvement of British Armed Forces and Hong Kong Police
- Hong Kong 1966 riots – with involvement of British Armed Forces and Hong Kong Police
- Hong Kong 1967 Leftist Riots – with involvement of British Armed Forces and Hong Kong Police
- Hong Kong 1981 riots – with involvement of Hong Kong Police
- 2005 WTO Conference Protests – with involvement of Hong Kong Police and anti-globalization protesters led by Hong Kong People's Alliance on WTO from 148 countries
- 2014 Hong Kong protests – with involvement of Hong Kong Police
- 2016 Mong Kok civil unrest – with involvement of Hong Kong Police
- 2019–20 Hong Kong protests – with involvement of Hong Kong Police

On 4 October 2019, Carrie Lam, the Chief Executive of Hong Kong S.A.R., invoked Section 2(1) of the Emergency Regulations Ordinance implemented since 1922 and last amended by the Legislative Council in 1999, which allow the government to implement the new, Prohibition on Face Covering Regulation. The new regulation forbid public assembly participants from wearing masks or obscure faces during such events without reasonable excuses. The permitted excuses are: pre-existing medical or health reasons, religious reasons, and the use of a face covering for physical safety while performing an activity connected with their profession or employment. Any person who defies the new regulation may face criminal prosecution. The government's motive in doing so is to end months of social unrest and riots; however, it did not declare a "State of Emergency". The new regulation took effect at 00:00 HKT on 5 October 2019. Offenders risked a maximum of one-year imprisonment or a fine of HK$25,000 (US$3,200).

The High Court of Hong Kong denied an application for a judicial injunction against the anti-mask law the same night, shortly before the new regulation took effect. A subsequent attempt by pro-democrats to halt the new regulation also failed; however, the court recommended a judicial review at a later date.

On 18 November 2019, the High Court ruled the "Cap. 241 Emergency Regulations Ordinance" is "incompatible with the Basic Law"; however, the court "leaves open the question of the constitutionality of the ERO insofar as it relates to any occasion of emergency." The court also held that the ordinance meets the "prescribed by law" requirement. However, the court deemed s3(1)(b), (c), (d) and s5 of the regulation do not meet the proportionality test as they impose restrictions on fundamental rights that go beyond what is necessary in furthering its intended goals.

On 22 November 2019, the High Court made the following remark:

Nevertheless, we recognize that our Judgment is only a judgment at first instance, and will soon be subject to an appeal to the Court of Appeal. In view of the great public importance of the issues raised in this case, and the highly exceptional circumstances that Hong Kong is currently facing, we consider it right that we should grant a short interim suspension order so that the respondents may have an opportunity to apply to the Court of Appeal, if so advised, for such interim relief as may be appropriate. Accordingly, we shall grant an interim temporary suspension order to postpone the coming into operation of the declarations of invalidity for a period of 7 days up to the end of 29 November 2019, with liberty to apply.

On 26 November 2019, the High Court announced hearing for the government appeal against the judgement is on 9 January 2020.

On 27 November 2019, the Court of Appeal extended the interim suspension of the judgment until 10 December 2019.

On 10 December 2019, the Court of Appeal refused to suspend the "unconstitutional" ruling by the Court of First Instance on the anti-mask regulation. As scheduled, a full hearing will commence on 9 January 2020.

On 21 December 2020, the Court of Final Appeal ruled that the prohibition on the use of face coverings at public gatherings, regardless of legality, was constitutional.

==== India ====
The State of Emergency can be proclaimed by the President of India when they perceive grave threats to the nation, albeit through the advice of the Union Council of Ministers. Part XVIII of the Constitution of India gives the President the power to overrule many provisions, including the ones guaranteeing fundamental rights to the citizens of India

In India, a state of emergency was declared twice:

1. Between 26 October 1962 to 10 January 1968 during the Sino-Indian War—the security of India having been declared "threatened by external aggression".
2. Between 3 December 1971 and 21 March 1977, originally proclaimed during the Indo-Pakistani War, and later extended on 25 June 1975, along with the third proclamation—the security of India having been declared "threatened by external aggression" and by "internal disturbances".

The first internal State of Emergency, popularly known as the Emergency, was declared by the then President Fakhruddin Ali Ahmed on the advice of then Prime Minister Indira Gandhi. The provisions of the Constitution allow the Prime Minister to rule by decree.

==== Israel ====
The Israeli state of emergency, as authorized by the Defence (Emergency) Regulations, is older than the state itself, having been passed under the British Mandate for Palestine in 1945. The regulations were incorporated into domestic law following the Israeli Declaration of Independence in 1948. A repeal was briefly considered in 1967 but was cancelled following the Six-Day War. The regulations allow Israel, through its military, to control movements and prosecute suspected terrorists in occupied territories, and to censor publications that are deemed prejudicial to national defense.

==== Macau (China) ====
The Standing Committee of the National People's Congress can declare a state of emergency and deploy troops from the People's Liberation Army Macau Garrison under Article 14 of Macau's Basic Law on the defence of the Macau Special Administrative Region.

Since the handover of Macau in 1999, no emergency measures have been enacted. Before 1999, emergency measures were used in the 12-3 incident (1966), with martial law being invoked and Portuguese troops involved.

==== Malaysia ====
In Malaysia, if the Yang di-Pertuan Agong (King) is satisfied that a grave emergency exists whereby the security, or the economic life, or public order in the Federation or any part thereof is threatened, he may issue a Proclamation of Emergency making therein a declaration to that effect.

A state of emergency was declared by the then-colonial government of Britain from 1948 until 1960 to deal with an insurgency of communists led by Chin Peng.

States of emergency were also declared during the Konfrontasi in 1962, the 1966 Sarawak constitutional crisis, and the 1977 Kelantan Emergency.

When a race riot broke out on 13 May 1969, a state of emergency was declared.

Amid severe haze on 11 August 2005, a state of emergency was announced for the world's 13th-largest port, Port Klang and the district of Kuala Selangor after air pollution there reached dangerous levels (defined as a value greater than 500 on the Air Pollution Index or API).

Thierry Rommel, the European Commission's envoy to Malaysia, told Reuters by telephone on 13 November 2007 (the last day of his mission) that, "Today, this country still lives under (a state of) emergency." Although not officially proclaimed as a state of emergency, the Emergency Ordinance and the Internal Security Act had allowed detention for years without trial.

On 23 June 2013, a state of emergency was declared by Prime Minister Najib Razak for Muar and Ledang, Johor, due to severe Southeast Asian haze that pushed the air pollution index to above 750. This was the first time in years that air quality had dipped to a hazardous level, with conditions worsening as dry weather persisted and fires raged in Sumatra.

On 12 January 2021, a nationwide state of emergency was declared by the Yang di-Pertuan Agong Abdullah of Pahang in response to the COVID-19 pandemic in Malaysia, at the request of Prime Minister Muhyiddin Yassin. The state of emergency is planned to end on 1 August 2021. The declaration included the suspension of parliament and elections, and came amid political instability. On 25 February 2021, Yang di-Pertuan Agong announced that the parliament can be convened during the state of emergency.

==== Pakistan ====
In Pakistan, a state of emergency was declared five times in its history:

- In 1958 by President Iskander Mirza
- In 1969 by President General Yahya Khan
- In 1977 by President General Muhammad Zia-ul-Haq
- In 1998 by President Muhammad Rafiq Tarar
- In 2007 by President General Pervez Musharraf

The first three were regarded as the imposition of direct martial law.

==== Philippines ====
Several situations call for various levels of government action in the Philippines. The constitution alludes to these:

- State of war: Declared by Manuel L. Quezon in 1941 after the United States' entry during World War II and lead to its occupation by Japanese forces.
- State of martial law: Six declarations in history (1896, 1898, 1944–45, 1972–1981, 2009 and 2017–2019)

These are not specified in the constitution, but were nevertheless declared at least once:

- State of rebellion: Last declared in 2003 due to the Oakwood mutiny
- State of emergency: Last two declarations were in 2006 and 2016–2023.
- State of public health emergency: Last declared in 2020 due to the COVID-19 pandemic in the Philippines.
- State of national energy emergency: Last declared in 2026 due to the 2026 Philippine energy crisis caused by the closure of Strait of Hormuz.
- State of calamity: Last national declaration was in 2025 due to Typhoon Kalmaegi (Tino). Local governments are also permitted to declare local states of calamity in their areas hit by natural and anthropogenic disasters.

==== Singapore ====
Article 150(1) of the Constitution of Singapore allows the President of Singapore to declare a state of emergency in the event of a security or economic threat and must notify Parliament as soon as practicable under Article 150(3). A state of emergency would last for six months under Article 150(6). With the repeal of the Emergency (Essential Powers) Act (Chapter 90) in 2021, only the powers granted by the Constitution are allowed to be exercised in an event of an emergency.

===== Special Emergency Powers (1964-2021) =====
When Singapore was part of Malaysia, the Federation of Malaysia declared a State of Emergency during the Indonesia-Malaysia confrontation. The Malaysian Parliament subsequently passed the Emergency (Essential Powers) Act 1964, which conferred upon the Yang di-Pertuan Agong (King) special powers during a State of Emergency, such as creating offenses and prescribing penalties, among others. When Singapore gained independence in 1965, that Emergency Act was inherited by Singapore, conferring those powers on the President of Singapore instead. The Act, together with its powers granted to the President, were repealed on 1 March 2021.

===== History of Emergency =====
In response to the Malayan Communist Party (MCP)'s murder of three British planters in Perak on 16 June 1948, Sir Edward Gent, the British High Commissioner of Malaya declared a State of Emergency in the whole of Perak and Johore. This emergency was extended to the whole of Malaya on 18 June, and six days later, Singapore came under a State of Emergency. The emergency officially ended on 31 July 1960, 12 years after its declaration, when Singapore was a self-governing state rather than a colony, where it had been imposed in the first place.

The second time Singapore experienced a State of Emergency was in 1964, when Indonesian commandos were airdropped into Malaysian territories on 1 and 2 September that year, at the height of the Indonesia-Malaysia confrontation. On 3 September, the King of Malaysia, Syed Putra Jamalullail of Perlis, declared a State of Emergency throughout Malaysia (in which Singapore was then part of) under the Article 150 of the Federal Constitution of Malaysia. On 10 and 11 September, the Dewan Rakyat and Dewan Negara of the Malaysian Parliament respectively passed the Emergency (Essential Powers) Act 1964, which became law on 18 September and conferred upon the King with special powers. This Act would then be inherited by Singapore upon its independence and became known as the Emergency (Essential Powers) Act (Chapter 90). The Act would remain in force for close to 57 years, until 2021.

While the British and the Malaysian federal authorities have declared a State of Emergency in Singapore, no Singaporean government has, thus far, declared one since the country's independence in 1965. This is due to the Singaporean government's reliance on the Internal Security Act 1960 and other targeted legislation to deal with security threats.

==== Sri Lanka ====
In Sri Lanka, the president can proclaim emergency regulations under the Public Security Ordinance in the constitution to preserve public security and public order; suppression of mutiny, riot or civil commotion; or maintenance of supplies and services essential to the life of the community. These regulations last for one month unless confirmed otherwise by Parliament.

==== Syria ====
An emergency prevailed in Syria from 1963, following the Ba'athist coup d'état, to 2011. Originally predicated on the conflict with Israel, the emergency acted to centralize authority in the presidency and the national security apparatus while silencing public dissent. The emergency was terminated in response to protests that preceded the Syrian Civil War. Under the 2012 constitution, the president may pass an emergency decree with a 2/3 concurrence of his ministers, provided that he presents it to the People's Assembly for constitutional review.

==== Turkey ====
Since the foundation of the Republic of Turkey in 1923, the military conducted three coups d'état and announced martial law. Martial law between 1978 and 1983 was replaced by a state of emergency that lasted until November 2002. The latest state of emergency was declared by President Recep Tayyip Erdoğan on 20 July 2016 following a failed coup attempt on 15 July 2016 by a faction of the country's armed forces. It was lifted on 18 July 2018.

=== Europe ===
==== Albania ====
The Constitution of Albania grants only the Parliament of Albania the power to declare a state of emergency, based on the advice of the government. The state of emergency can last for up to 60 days, and may be extended by the parliament for no more than 90 days.

==== Finland ====
The Finnish Government, in cooperation with the President of Finland, may declare a state of emergency in Finland, after which it is possible to apply the provisions of the Emergency Powers and Defence Act. A state of emergency may only be declared when all other legislative means have been exhausted.

According to an earlier law, passed in 1930, Finland could be declared a state of war if necessary. Under this law, Finland was declared a state of war on 30 November 1939, after the start of the Winter War, and the state of war continued until 26 September 1947.

The most recent state of emergency was declared during the COVID-19 pandemic in 2020, when the Marin cabinet invoked a state of emergency in Finland to alleviate the epidemic. These measures included, among other things, temporarily isolating the Uusimaa region from the rest of Finland.

==== France ====
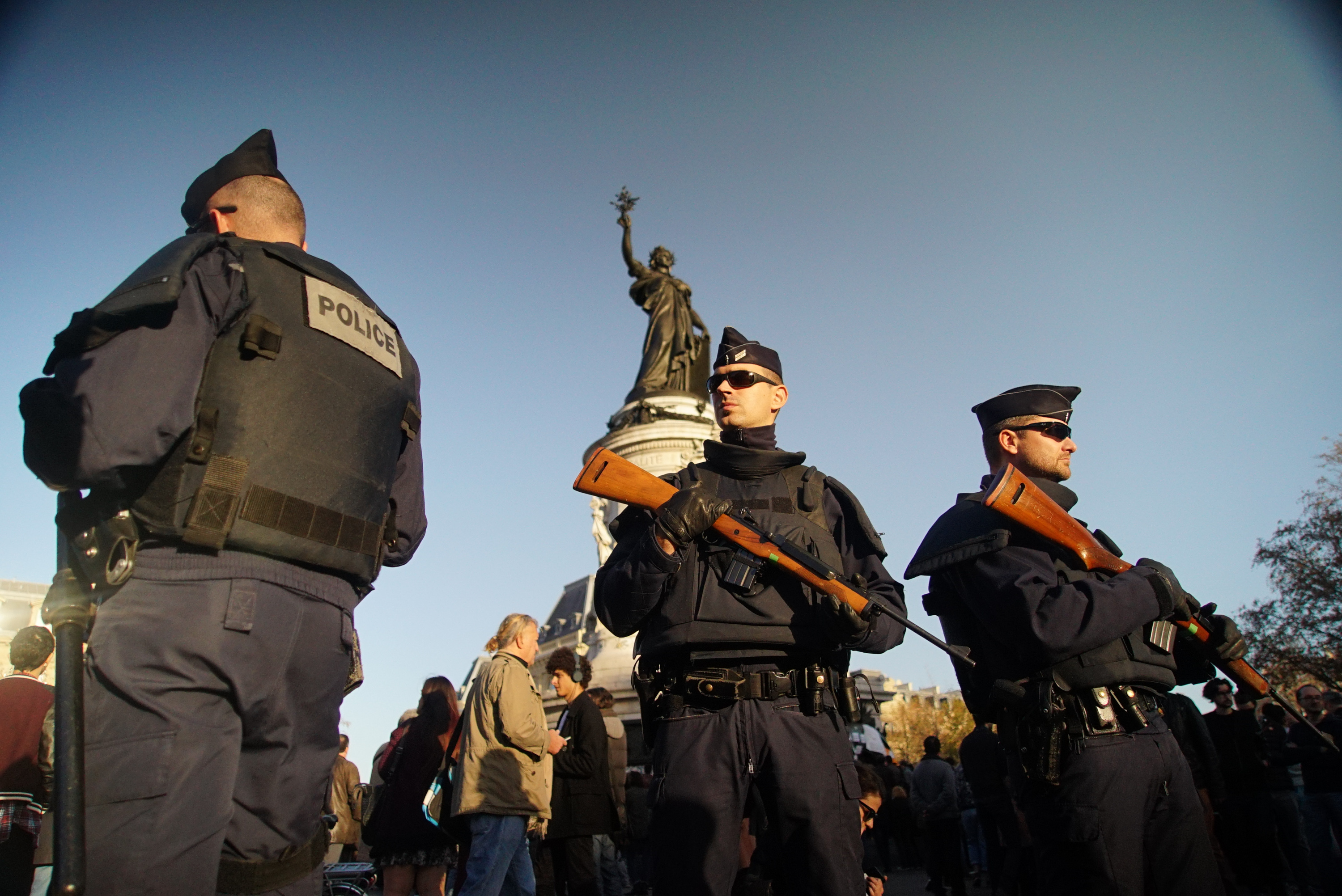
Police stationed in Paris during a state of emergency, November 2015

Three main provisions concern various kinds of "state of emergency" in France: Article 16 of the Constitution of 1958 allows, in time of crisis, "extraordinary powers" to be used by the president. Article 36 of the same constitution regulates a "state of siege" (état de siège). Finally, the Act of 3 April 1955 allows the proclamation, by the Council of Ministers, of a "state of emergency" (état d'urgence). The distinction between article 16 and the 1955 Act concerns mainly the distribution of powers: whereas in article 16, the executive power overturns the regular procedures of the Republic, the 1955 Act permits a twelve-day state of emergency, after which a new law extending the emergency must be voted by the Parliament of France. These dispositions have been used at various times: three times during the Algerian War (in 1955, 1958 and 1961), in 1984 during violent pro-independence revolts in New Caledonia, during the 2005 riots, following the 2015 Paris terrorist attacks, and during the 2024 unrest in New Caledonia.

==== Germany ====
The Weimar Constitution (1919–1933) allowed states of emergency under Article 48 to deal with rebellions. Article 48 was often invoked during the 14-year life of the Weimar Republic, sometimes for no reason other than to allow the government to act when it was unable to obtain a parliamentary majority.

After 27 February 1933, Reichstag fire, an attack blamed on the communists, Adolf Hitler declared a state of emergency using Article 48, and then had President Paul von Hindenburg sign the Reichstag Fire Decree, which suspended some of the basic civil liberties provided by the Weimar Constitution (such as habeas corpus, freedom of expression, freedom of the speech, the freedom to assemble or the privacy of communications) for the whole duration of the Third Reich. On 23 March, the Reichstag enacted the Enabling Act of 1933 with the required two-thirds majority, which enabled Chancellor Adolf Hitler and his cabinet to enact laws without legislative participation. The Weimar Constitution was never actually repealed by Nazi Germany; it effectively became inoperable after the passage of the Enabling Act. These two laws effectively ended the Weimar democracy, and paved the way for the Nazification of society, termed Gleichschaltung, which instituted totalitarianism.

In the postwar Federal Republic of Germany the Emergency Acts state that some of the basic constitutional rights of the Basic Law may be limited in case of a State of Defence, a state of tension, or an internal state of emergency or disaster (catastrophe). These amendments to the constitution were passed on 30 May 1968, despite fierce opposition by the so-called extra-parliamentary opposition (see German student movement for details).

==== Hungary ====
On 25 May 2022, Hungary's governing party approved a constitutional change allowing the government to declare a "state of danger" in the event of an armed conflict or humanitarian crisis in a neighboring country. Soon after, Prime Minister Viktor Orbán, who had been freshly re-elected, invoked this new authority to declare such a state, citing the ongoing war in Ukraine. The amendment was passed without any public input or consultation. It was ended by the Magyar Government on 14 May 2026.

==== Ireland ====
In Ireland declaring a state of "national emergency" involves Article 28.3.3° of the 1937 Constitution of Ireland, which states that:

Nothing in this Constitution [...] shall be invoked to invalidate any law enacted by the Oireachtas [parliament] which is expressed to be for the purpose of securing the public safety and the preservation of the State in time of war or armed rebellion, or to nullify any act done or purporting to be done in time of war or armed rebellion in pursuance of any such law.

In addition, during a "war or armed rebellion", military tribunals may try civilians, and the Defence Forces are not bound by habeas corpus.

The First Amendment of the Constitution of 1939 allows an emergency to be declared during wars in which the state is a non-belligerent, subject to resolutions by the houses of the Oireachtas. By the 2nd Amendment of 1941, an emergency ends, not automatically when the war does, but only by Oireachtas resolutions. The 21st Amendment of 2002 prevents the reintroduction of capital punishment during an emergency.

The first amendment was rushed through the Oireachtas after the outbreak of the Second World War, in which the state remained neutral. Immediately after, the required resolution was passed, in turn enabling the passage of the Emergency Powers Act 1939 (EPA), which granted the government and its ministers sweeping powers to issue statutory orders termed "Emergency Powers Orders" (EPOs). (The period in Ireland was and is referred to as "The Emergency".) The EPA expired in 1946, although some EPOs were continued under the Supplies and Services (Temporary Provisions) Act 1946 until as late as 1957. Rationing continued until 1951.

The 1939 state of emergency was not formally ended until a 1976 resolution, which also declared a new state of emergency in relation to the Troubles in Northern Ireland and in particular the recent assassination of the British ambassador to Ireland, Christopher Ewart Biggs. The Emergency Powers Act 1976 was then passed to increase the Garda Síochána powers to arrest, detain, and question those suspected of offences against the state. President Cearbhall Ó Dálaigh referred the bill under Article 26 of the Constitution to the Supreme Court, which upheld its constitutionality. The referral was condemned by minister Paddy Donegan as a "thundering disgrace", causing Ó Dálaigh to resign in protest. The 1976 EPA expired after one year, but the state of emergency persisted until 1995, when as part of the Northern Ireland peace process it was rescinded as a "confidence building measure" to satisfy physical force republicans after the Provisional IRA's 1994 ceasefire.

The Offences against the State Act does not require a state of emergency under Article 28.3.3°. Part V of the Act, which provides for a non-jury Special Criminal Court (SCC), is permitted under Article 38.3.1°. Part V is activated by a declaration from the government that it is "necessary to secure the preservation of public peace and order", and it can be rescinded by vote of Dáil Éireann. Provision for internment is similarly activated and rescinded (originally by Part VI of the 1939 act, later by Part II of a 1940 amending act). Parts V and VI were both activated during the Second World War and the IRA's late 1950s Border Campaign; Part V has been continually active since 1972.

Several official reviews of the Constitution and the Offences Against the State Acts have recommended a time limit within which the operation of Article 28.3.3° or Article 38.3.1° must either be explicitly renewed by resolution or else lapse.

==== Italy ====
In Italy, the state of emergency established by the legal system is implemented by the Council of Ministers without a parliamentary vote, under Law n. 225 of 1992 on Civil Protection. Moreover, the Article 120 of the Constitution provides that the government can exercise "substitute powers" of local authorities in typically situations: to protect the legal or economic unity of the state, in case of violation of supranational laws and to face a danger for safety and public safety. For other emergency, such as a war, a parliamentary vote is required to give extraordinary powers to the government.

The Parliament of Italy can also give extraordinary powers to the government in case of health emergency, as it occurred during the COVID-19 pandemic in 2020, when the Parliament approved a state of emergency from 31 January 2020 to 31 December 2021, thanks to what the government can implement administrative acts, without the approval of the Parliament.

==== Portugal ====
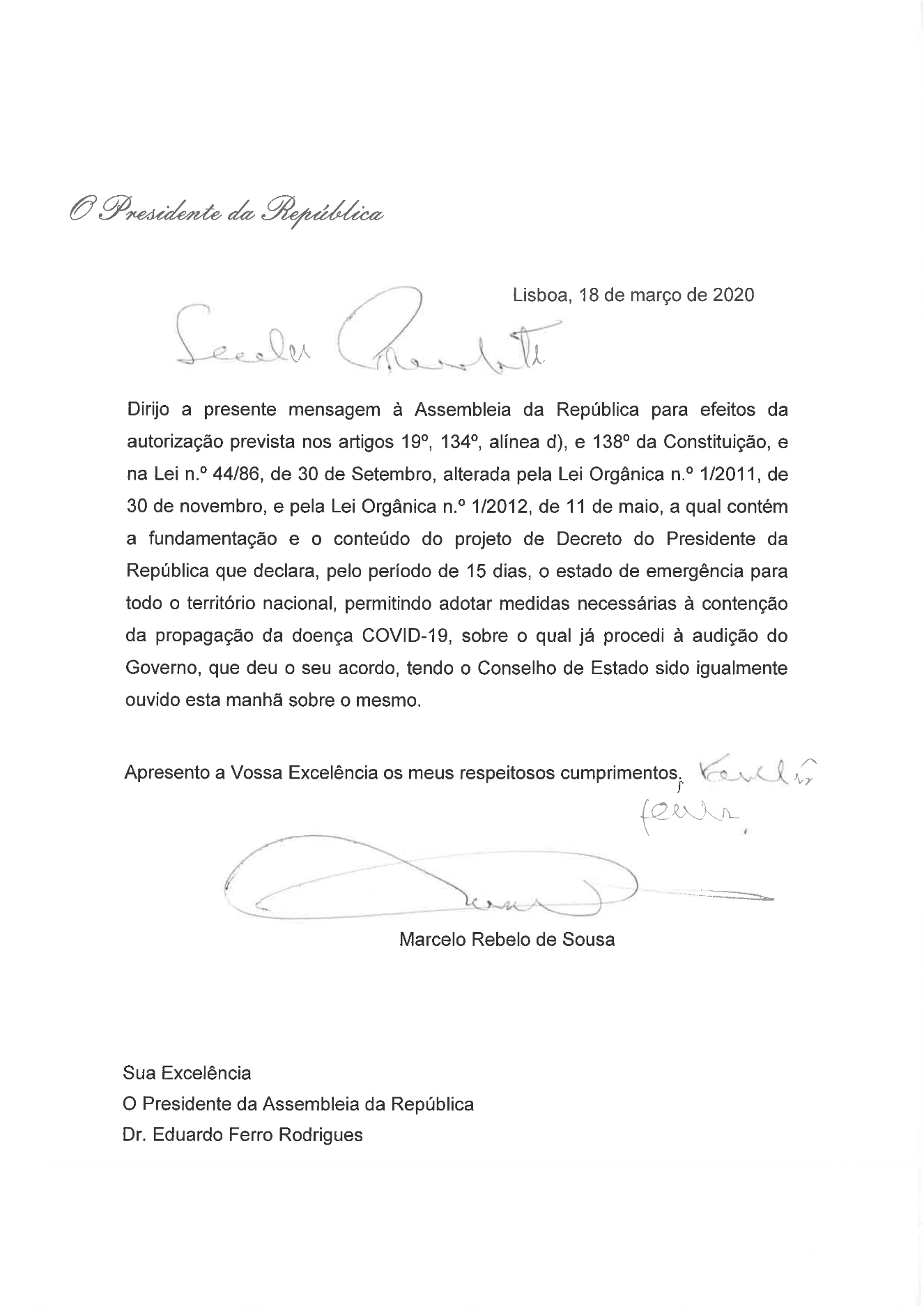
Letter from the Portuguese President, Marcelo Rebelo de Sousa, to the Speaker of the Assembly of the Republic, Eduardo Ferro Rodrigues, requesting Parliament for authorisation under the terms of the Constitution, for a declaration of the state of emergency in the context of the 2020 COVID-19 pandemic

The current Constitution of Portugal empowers the President of the Republic to declare a state of siege (Portuguese: estado de sítio) or a state of emergency (Portuguese: estado de emergência) in part or the entirety of the Portuguese territory, only in cases of actual or imminent aggression by foreign forces, serious threats to or disturbances of the democratic constitutional order, or public disasters.

Such declarations allow the entities that exercise sovereignty from suspending the exercise of some of the constitutionally defined rights, freedoms and guarantees, so that the public authorities can take the appropriate and strictly necessary measures for the prompt restoration of constitutional normality; the Constitution, however, sets a temporal limit for these states of emergency (no more than fifteen days, even though renewal is possible) and forbids any suspension of the right to life, to personal integrity, to personal identity, to civil capacity and citizenship, the non-retroactivity of criminal law, the right to a fair trial, or the freedom of conscience and religion. They also may not affect the constitutionally defined competences and mode of operation of the entities that exercise sovereignty. The Assembly of the Republic may not be dissolved while a state of siege or a state of emergency is in force, nor can the Constitution itself be subject to amendment.

Before declaring a state of siege or a state of emergency, the President is required to consult with the Government and request authorisation to do so from the Assembly of the Republic.

During the Third Portuguese Republic, the only two times such states of exceptional suppression of constitutional provisions were declared were during the failed left-wing coup d'état of 25 November 1975 (state of siege, within the confines of the Lisbon Military Region), and during the COVID-19 pandemic (state of emergency, in the entirety of the Portuguese territory).

Within the remit of the basic law of civil protection services (Portuguese: Lei de Bases da Protecção Civil), the prime minister can, through a Resolution of the Council of Ministers and without the need of parliamentary approval or presidential promulgation, decree a situation of calamity (Portuguese: situação de calamidade). Lesser exceptional statuses, the situation of contingency (Portuguese: situação de contingência) and the situation of alert (Portuguese: situação de alerta) in descending order of importance, can also be set in motion by other civil protection authorities or Mayors. These three situations allow for some extraordinary measures and special restrictions, but not the suspension of constitutional rights and freedoms.

==== Poland ====
In Poland, the institution of the state of emergency was subsumed under the institution of martial law in the constitutional regulations of 1952–1983. According to the provisions of the Constitution of 1997 (Articles 228 et seq.), A state of emergency may be introduced by the president at the request of the Council of Ministers for a specified period of time, but not longer than 90 days, in part or throughout the territory of the country, if the security of the state, the security of citizens or public order has been threatened. The President may extend this state only once (for no more than 60 days) with the consent of the Sejm. During the state of emergency and within 90 days from its end, the Constitution and electoral regulations may not be changed, and the Sejm may not be dissolved; there are also no national elections or referendums. In the event of the expiry of the term of office of the President, the Sejm and the Senate, or local self-government bodies, they are appropriately extended.

==== Romania ====
Special zone of public safety (Zonă specială de siguranță publică in Romanian): Administrative, can be enforced by local police. This implies the installation of road checkpoints and a higher number of police and gendarmes/riot police patrolling the area. There is also a ban that restricts the right to travel for people in the area; any vehicle and individual transiting the zone are subject to screening.

The last instance in which the special zone of public safety was enforced was on 8 December 2013, in Pungești, Vaslui following civil unrest in Pungești from Chevron's plans to begin exploring shale-gas in the village. According to police officials, the special security zone will be maintained as long as there is conflict in the area that poses a threat to Chevron's operations. This special security zone has faced domestic and international criticism for alleged human-rights abuses.

==== Spain ====
In Spain, there are three degrees of state of emergency (estado de emergencia in Spanish): alarma (alarm or alert), excepción (exception[al circumstance]), and sitio (siege). They are named by the constitution, which limits which rights may be suspended, but regulated by the "Ley Orgánica 4/1981" (Organic Law).

On 4 December 2010, the first state of alert was declared following the air traffic controllers strike. It was the first time since the Spanish transition to democracy that a state of emergency was declared. The second state of alert was declared on 14 March 2020 due to the coronavirus pandemic. The third state of alert was declared before the end of October 2020 given the difficulties to control the spread of said pandemic.

==== Switzerland ====
According to Art. 185 of the Swiss Federal Constitution The Federal Council (Bundesrat) can call up in their own competence military personnel of a maximum of 4000 militia for three weeks to safeguard inner or outer security (called Federal Intervention or Federal Execution, respectively). A larger number of soldiers or of a longer duration is subject to parliamentary decision. For deployments within Switzerland, the principle of subsidiarity applies: as a first step, unrest must be addressed with the aid of cantonal police units.

==== United Kingdom ====
A state of emergency was last invoked in the United Kingdom in 1974 by Prime Minister Edward Heath in response to increasing industrial action.

===== Civil Contingencies Act 2004 =====
In the United Kingdom, only the British Sovereign, on the advice of the Privy Council, or a Minister of the Crown in exceptional circumstances, has the power to introduce emergency regulations under the Civil Contingencies Act 2004, in case of an emergency, broadly defined as war or attack by a foreign power, terrorism which poses a threat of serious damage to the security of the UK, or events which threaten serious damage to human welfare or the environment of a place in the UK. The duration of these regulations is limited to thirty days, but may be extended by Parliament.

The act grants wide-ranging powers to central and local government in the event of an emergency. It allows the modification of primary legislation by emergency regulation, except for the Human Rights Act 1998 and Part 2 of the Civil Contingencies Act 2004 itself.

===== Other emergency powers =====
In addition to the emergency regulations power in the Civil Contingencies Act, other acts of Parliament grant the government emergency powers over various sectors of civilian life, including:

- control and operation of the rail network in Great Britain (Railways Act 1993)
- control of civilian air traffic and power to take possession of airports (Transport Act 2000)
- control of broadcast radio and television (Communications Act 2003)
- suspension of use of landline and mobile telephone networks, and access to the Internet (Communications Act 2003)
- suspension of banking and building society transactions, bullion and foreign currency trading and the operation of commodity and stock exchanges (Banking and Financial Dealings Act 1971)
- suspension of controls on drivers' working hours (Transport Act 1968)
- control of the production, supply, acquisition and use of crude oil, petroleum products, natural gas, and any other 'fuel substance', together with electricity (Energy Act 1976)
- control of the public water supply and wastewater disposal (Water Industry Act 1991)

=== Oceania ===
==== Australia ====
State-of-emergency legislation varies by state in Australia. Concerning emergency management, regions (usually on a local government area basis) that have been affected by a natural disaster are the responsibility of the state, until that state declares a State of Emergency, where access to the Federal Emergency Fund becomes available to help respond to and recover from natural disasters. A State of Emergency does not apply to the whole state, but rather districts or shires, where essential services may have been disrupted.

On 18 March 2020, a nationwide human biosecurity emergency was declared in Australia owing to the risks to human health posed by the coronavirus (COVID-19) pandemic, after the National Security Committee met the previous day. The Biosecurity Act 2015 specifies that the governor-general of Australia may declare such an emergency if the Health Minister is satisfied that "a listed human disease is posing a severe and immediate threat, or is causing harm, to human health on a nationally significant scale". This gives the Minister sweeping powers, including imposing restrictions or preventing the movement of people and goods between specified places, and evacuations. The Biosecurity (Human Biosecurity Emergency) (Human Coronavirus with Pandemic Potential) Declaration 2020 was declared by the Governor-General, David Hurley, under Section 475 of the Act.

===== New South Wales =====
In New South Wales, the NSW Premier can, pursuant to the State Emergency and Rescue Management Act 1989, declare a state of emergency due to an actual or imminent occurrence (such as fire, flood, storm, earthquake, explosion, terrorist act, accident, epidemic or warlike action) which endangers, or threatens to endanger, the safety or health of persons or animals in the State, or destroys or damages, or threatens to destroy or damage, property in the State, or causes a failure of, or a significant disruption to, an essential service or infrastructure. The Premier declared a state of emergency on 11 November 2019 in response to the 2019–2020 New South Wales bushfires. It was the fifth time that a state of emergency had been declared in that state since 2006, and it lasted for seven days. Subsequent declarations were made on 19 December for a further seven days, and again on 2 January 2020. In NSW, the 2019–2020 bushfire season resulted in 26 deaths, destroyed 2,448 homes, and burnt 5.5 million hectares (14 million acres).

===== Victoria =====
In Victoria, the Victorian Premier can declare a state of emergency under the Public Safety Preservation Act 1958 if there is a threat to employment, safety or public order. A declared state of emergency allows the Premier to immediately make any desired regulations to secure public order and safety. The declaration expires after 30 days, and a resolution of either the upper or lower House of Parliament may revoke it earlier. However, these regulations expire if Parliament does not agree to continue them within seven days.

The Premier (or a delegate) may operate or prohibit operation of any essential service, such as transport, fuel, power, water or gas, under the Essential Services Act 1958.

If there is an emergency which the Premier, after considering the advice of the relevant Minister and the Emergency Management Commissioner, is satisfied constitutes or is likely to constitute a significant and widespread danger to life or property in Victoria, the Premier, pursuant to the Emergency Management Act 1986, may declare a state of disaster to exist in the whole or in any part or parts of the State. The state of disaster addresses matters beyond public health issues; it is intended to deal with emergencies such as natural disasters, explosions, terrorism or sieges, and it can also be used to deal with 'a plague or an epidemic'.

The Public Health and Wellbeing Act 2008 gives the Chief Health Officer extensive powers to take action 'to investigate, eliminate or reduce public health risks', including power to detain, restrict the movement of or prevent entry of any person in the emergency area, "and to give any other direction that the authorized officer considers is reasonably necessary to protect public health."

==== New Zealand ====
The Civil Defence Emergency Management Act 2002 gives the New Zealand Government and local-body councils the power to issue a state of emergency, either over the entire country or within a specific region. This may suspend ordinary work and essential services if need be. States of emergency in New Zealand expire on the commencement of the seventh day after the date of a declaration unless extended. However, the Minister of Civil Defence or a local mayor may lift a state of emergency after an initial review of a region's status.

- In 1951, the First National Government issued emergency regulations in response to that year's waterfront dispute.
- On 23 February 2011 at 11.28 am the Minister of Civil Defence John Carter declared the first state of national emergency (for a civil-defence emergency) in New Zealand's history in response to the 22 February 2011 Christchurch earthquake. A local state of emergency was declared by mayors of Christchurch City, Selwyn District and Waimakariri District following 4 September 2010 Canterbury earthquake.
- On 25 March 2020 at 12.21 pm, the Minister for Civil Defense Peeni Henare declared a state of national emergency in response to the total cases of COVID-19 reaching 205. Combined with an epidemic notice issued under the Epidemic Preparedness Act 2006, the state of emergency declaration enabled authorities to close most premises in New Zealand and enforce a nationwide lockdown. This also granted special powers to combat COVID-19, including the power to requisition, close roads, and restrict movement. Director of Civil Defence Emergency Management Sarah Stuart-Black said these powers sat alongside other powers to ensure essential services could stay up and running. The state of national emergency was renewed four times, to last for a total of five weeks.
- On 14 February 2023 at 8:43 am, the Minister for Civil Defense Kieran McAnulty declared a state of national emergency in response to Cyclone Gabrielle reaching New Zealand and causing flooding and evacuations.

=== Active in 2026 ===
- On 1 April 2026, the municipal government of Bongao in Tawi-Tawi, Philippines, declared a state of local emergency due to a critical fuel supply shortage, which disrupted their transportation, fishing operations, delivery of basic goods, and essential government services. The declaration authorized the use of local calamity funds and emergency response measures.
- On 24 March 2026, the President of the Philippines, Bongbong Marcos, declared a state of national energy emergency due to an energy crisis in the country because of the closure of Strait of Hormuz amid the 2026 Iran war.
- On 3 January 2026, the President of Venezuela, Nicolás Maduro, declared a state of emergency after strikes from the United States were reported. Maduro was captured some time later.

=== Active in 2025 ===
- On 16 February 2025, the Governor of West Virginia in the United States, Patrick Morrisey declared a state of emergency due to severe flooding across southern West Virginia.

=== Active in 2024 ===
- On 30 December 2024, President of Trinidad and Tobago Christine Kangaloo issued the declaration of a state of emergency on the advice of Prime Minister Keith Rowley over surging violence as weapons from the United States fuel a crime wave around the Caribbean.
- On 26 July 2024, then-Governor of West Virginia in the United States, Jim Justice declared a state of emergency due to an ongoing severe drought. The declaration was originally supposed to last for 30 days; but was later extended on 23 August 2024 for an additional 30 days.
- On 26 March 2024, the Governor of Maryland in the United States, Wes Moore declared a state of emergency due to the collapse of the Francis Scott Key Bridge.
- On 14 January 2024, the Governor of Kentucky in the United States, Andy Beshear declared a state of emergency due to the severe winter storms.
- On 11 January 2024, Papua New Guinea's Prime Minister James Marape declared a state of emergency due to the 2024 Papua New Guinean unrest.
- On 9 January 2024, Ecuador's President Daniel Noboa declared a state of emergency following the escape of José Adolfo Macías Villamar, leader of the Los Choneros drug cartel, from prison.

=== Active in 2023 ===
- On 10 November 2023, Icelandic authorities declared a state of emergency after a series of powerful earthquakes rocked the country's southwestern Reykjanes peninsula, signalling the increased likelihood of a volcanic eruption in the region. The village of Grindavík was ordered to evacuate due to the imminent volcanic eruption of the Fagradalsfjall volcano.
- On 4 August 2023, Ethiopia's Council of Ministers declared a state of emergency in the Amhara region after clashes between regional armed forces and the military.
- On 7 February 2023, Turkey's President Recep Tayyip Erdoğan declared a three-month-long state of emergency in 10 cities due to the 2023 Turkey–Syria earthquake.
- On 8 September 2023, United States President Joe Biden extended the state of emergency declared by George W. Bush after the September 11 attacks.

=== Active in 2022 ===
- On 5 January 2022, Kazakhstan's President Kassym-Jomart Tokayev declared a state of emergency due to the 2022 Kazakh protests.
- On 6 February 2022, Ottawa's Mayor Jim Watson declared a state of emergency due to the Freedom Convoy protests.
- On 11 February 2022, Ontario Premier Doug Ford declared a state of emergency due to the Freedom Convoy protests.
- On 23 February 2022, Ukraine announced in response to the Russian invasion of its territory that it would declare a nationwide state of emergency, excluding the occupied territories in Donbas. On the same day, Russia began evacuating its embassy in Kyiv and lowered the Russian flag from the top of the building.
- On 24 February 2022, Moldova announced that it will declare a nationwide state of emergency in response to the invasion, as thousands of Ukrainians flee into Moldovan territory.
- On 24 February 2022, Lithuania declared a state of emergency due to possible disturbances and provocations as large military forces massed in Russia and Belarus.
- On 26 March 2022, El Salvador declared a state of emergency after 62 people were murdered, making it the most violent day since the end of the civil war in 1992.
- On 2 April 2022, Sri Lanka's President Gotabaya Rajapaksa declared a state of emergency due to the 2022 Sri Lankan protests.
- On 14 April 2022, Georgia's Governor Brian Kemp declared a state of emergency due to supply chain disruptions and the COVID-19 pandemic.
- On 16 May 2022, Poland Minister of Health Adam Niedzielski declared a state of epidemic threat for COVID-19.
- On 24 May 2022, Hungary declared a state of emergency due to the economic impact of the Russian invasion of Ukraine.
- On 18 June 2022, Ecuador declared a state of emergency due to the 2022 Ecuadorian protests.
- On 2 July 2022, Uzbekistan declared a state of emergency due to the 2022 Karakalpak protests.
- On 4 July 2022, Italy declared a state of emergency in five northern regions due to a severe drought, one of the worst of the decade.
- On 11 July 2022, Portugal declared a state of emergency due to forest fires.
- On 15 July 2022, the United Kingdom declared a national emergency due to the 2022 UK Heatwaves
- On 28 July 2022, Kentucky Governor Andy Beshear declared a state of emergency due to historic flooding in Eastern Kentucky.
- On 25 August 2022, Pakistan declared a state of emergency because of the flooding.

=== Active in 2021 ===
- On 1 February 2021, following a military coup in Myanmar, Min Aung Hlaing, Commander-in-Chief of Armed Forces of Myanmar and the new State Leader, declared a state of emergency lasting one year.
- On 15 May 2021, following a mass surge in the number of deaths and COVID-19 infections, no hospital beds being available and a lack of COVID-19 vaccines, Prime Minister of Trinidad and Tobago Keith Rowley, declared a state of emergency due to the rapid and deadly spread of the COVID-19 pandemic in Trinidad and Tobago, noted as being one of the worst in the world.
- On 2 September 2021, Poland declared a state of emergency in the terrain surrounding Belarus–Poland border. The request was motivated by – according to the government – possible threats to security and public order in part of the territory of Poland. It covered 183 localities near the Belarusian border: 115 in Podlaskie Voivodeship and 68 in Lublin Voivodeship
- On 15 September 2021, Alberta declared a state of public health emergency to protect their health care system, which had become in crisis because of COVID-19.
- On 2 November 2021, Ethiopia declared a state of emergency aimed to protect civilians from atrocities being committed by the Tigray People's Liberation Front in several parts of the country.
- On 10 November 2021, Lithuania declared a state of emergency in the border region of Belarus-Lithuania border due to the 2021 Belarus–European Union border crisis.
- On 11 December 2021, Kentucky Governor Andy Beshear declared a state of emergency for parts of western Kentucky due to the Tornado outbreak of December 10–11, 2021.

=== Active in 2020 ===
- On 9 October 2020, Kyrgyzstan's President Sooronbay Jeenbekov declared a state of emergency due to the 2020 Kyrgyzstan protests.
- On 25 August 2020, Wisconsin's Governor Tony Evers declared a state of emergency due to Kenosha unrest.
- On 18 August 2020, California's Governor Gavin Newsom declared a state of emergency because of the multiple wildfires being battled across the state.
- On 5 August 2020, Lebanon's Prime Minister Hassan Diab declared a state of emergency after the 2020 Beirut explosion.
- On 6 July 2020, Georgia Governor Brian Kemp declared a state of emergency for the George Floyd protests.
- On 31 May 2020, Missouri Governor Mike Parson declared a state of emergency for the George Floyd protests.
- On 31 May 2020, Georgia Governor Brian Kemp declared a state of emergency for the George Floyd protests.
- On 31 May 2020, Texas Governor Greg Abbott declared a state of emergency for the George Floyd protests.
- On 31 May 2020, Virginia Governor Ralph Northam declared a state of emergency for the George Floyd protests.
- On 31 May 2020, Arizona Governor Doug Ducey declared a state of emergency for the George Floyd protests.
- On 28 May 2020, Minnesota Governor Tim Walz declared a state of emergency for the George Floyd protests.
- On 9 April 2020, Botswana President Mokgweetsi Masisi declared a state of emergency due to the COVID-19 pandemic.
- On 7 April 2020, Japan Prime Minister Shinzo Abe declared a national emergency for the COVID-19 pandemic.
- On 25 March 2020, New Zealand Minister for Civil Defence Peeni Henare declared a National State Of Emergency for COVID-19.
- On 25 March 2020, Prime Minister of Thailand Prayut Chan-o-cha declared a state of emergency for COVID-19.
- On 22 March 2020, Nova Scotia Premier Stephen McNeil declared a state of emergency for COVID-19.
- On 21 March 2020, Kyrgyzstan Prime Minister Mukhammedkalyi Abylgaziev declared a state of emergency for COVID-19.
- On 20 March 2020, Poland Minister of Health Łukasz Szumowski declared a state of the epidemic for COVID-19.
- On 18 March 2020, Luxembourg Prime Minister Xavier Bettel declared a state of emergency for COVID-19.
- On 18 March 2020, Portugal President Marcelo Rebelo de Sousa declared a state of emergency for COVID-19. It was renewed twice (2 and 17 April) in the constitutionally mandated 15-day periods, lasting until 1 minute before midnight on 2 May 2020. Beginning midnight, 3 May 2020, the country is now in a "situation of calamity" (Portuguese: situação de calamidade), a different status enshrined in the Basic Law of Civil Protection, which allows for restrictions on circulation or conditioning in the operation of certain establishments, but not the suspension of constitutional rights and freedoms as with the state of emergency.
- On 18 March 2020, North Macedonia President Stevo Pendarovski declared a state of emergency for COVID-19.
- On 17 March 2020, Alberta Premier Jason Kenney declares public health emergency for COVID-19.
- On 17 March 2020, Ontario Premier Doug Ford declared a state of emergency for COVID-19.
- On 17 March 2020, Philippine President Rodrigo Duterte declared all of the Philippines to be in a state of calamity following a dramatic rise in cases of COVID-19; the declaration was eventually lifted in September 2022.
- On 16 March 2020, Government of Armenia declared a state of emergency for COVID-19.
- On 15 March 2020, President of Serbia Aleksandar Vučić declared a state of emergency for COVID-19.
- On 15 March 2020, President of Kazakhstan Kassym-Jomart Tokayev declared a state of emergency for COVID-19.
- On 14 March 2020, Quebec Premier Francois Legault declares public health emergency for COVID-19.
- On 14 March 2020, Poland Minister of Health Łukasz Szumowski declared a state of epidemic threat for COVID-19.
- On 13 March 2020, Prime Minister of Spain Pedro Sánchez announced the declaration of the state of emergency in the nation for a period of 15 days, to become effective next day after the approval of the Council of Ministers for the COVID-19 pandemic in Spain.
- On 13 March 2020, President Donald Trump declared a national emergency for the ongoing COVID-19 pandemic
  - On 15 March 2020, Maine Governor Janet Mills declared a state of emergency for COVID-19.
  - On 13 March 2020, Minnesota Governor Tim Walz declared a state of emergency for COVID-19.
  - On 13 March 2020, Louisiana Governor John Bel Edwards declared a state of emergency for COVID-19.
  - On 13 March 2020, Alabama Governor Kay Ivey declared a state of public health emergency for COVID-19.
  - On 12 March 2020, Kansas Governor Laura Kelly declared a state of emergency for COVID-19.
  - On 12 March 2020, Virginia Governor Ralph Northam declared a state of emergency for COVID-19.
  - On 12 March 2020, Wisconsin Governor Tony Evers declared a state of emergency for COVID-19.
  - On 11 March 2020, Arizona Governor Doug Ducey declared a state of emergency for COVID-19.
  - On 11 March 2020, New Mexico Governor Michelle Lujan Grisham declared a state of emergency for COVID-19.
  - On 10 March 2020, Michigan Governor Gretchen Whitmer declared a state of emergency for COVID-19.
  - On 10 March 2020, Massachusetts Governor Charlie Baker declared a state of emergency for COVID-19.
  - On 10 March 2020, North Carolina Governor Roy Cooper declared a state of emergency for COVID-19.
  - On 10 March 2020, Colorado Governor Jared Polis declared a state of emergency for COVID-19.
  - On 9 March 2020, New Jersey Governor Phil Murphy declared a state of emergency for COVID-19.
  - On 9 March 2020, Ohio Governor Mike DeWine declared a state of emergency for COVID-19.
  - On 8 March 2020, Oregon Governor Kate Brown declared a state of emergency for COVID-19.
  - On 7 March 2020, New York Governor Andrew Cuomo declared a state of emergency for COVID-19.
  - On 6 March 2020, Tennessee Governor Bill Lee declared a state of emergency for COVID-19.
  - On 6 March 2020, Kentucky Governor Andy Beshear declared a state of emergency for COVID-19.
  - On 5 March 2020, Maryland Governor Larry Hogan declared a state of emergency for COVID-19.
  - On 4 March 2020. California Governor Gavin Newsom declared a state of emergency for COVID-19.
  - On 29 February 2020, Washington Governor Jay Inslee declared a state of emergency for COVID-19.
  - On 29 February 2020, Florida Governor Ron DeSantis declared a state of emergency for COVID-19.
- On 11 March 2020, Hungarian Prime Minister Viktor Orbán declared a state of emergency for COVID-19.
- On 3 March 2020, Tennessee Governor Bill Lee declared a state of emergency following the tornado outbreak of 2–3 March 2020.

=== Past states of emergency ===
- On 14 February 2023, New Zealand's Minister of Emergency Management Kieran McAnulty declared a national state of emergency following severe and widespread impacts from Ex-Tropical Cyclone Gabrielle. The state of emergency was lifted on 14 March.
- On 12 January 2021, a national state of emergency was declared by the Yang di-Pertuan Agong of Malaysia Al-Sultan Abdullah to curb the spread of COVID-19. The state of emergency was lifted on 1 August.
- On 7 January 2021, Japanese Prime Minister Yoshihide Suga declared the second state of emergency for the COVID-19 in several prefectures. It was lifted on 22 March.
- On 14 January 2021, New Mexico's Governor Michelle Lujan Grisham declared a state of emergency in preparation of Inauguration of Joe Biden.
- On 15 January 2021, Maryland's Governor Larry Hogan declared a state of emergency in preparation of Inauguration of Joe Biden.
- On 6 January 2021, Virginia's Governor Ralph Northam declared a state of emergency due to the attack at the United States Capitol.
- On 11 January 2021, outgoing President Donald Trump declared a state of emergency for two weeks in Washington, DC, in preparation of the inauguration of Joe Biden.
- On 15 October 2020, Thailand's Prime Minister Prayuth Chan-ocha declared a state of extreme emergency in Bangkok due to 2020 Thai protests. and was lifted on 22 October.
- On 7 April 2020, Japan Prime Minister Shinzō Abe declared a national emergency for the COVID-19.
- On 21 March 2020, Georgian President Salome Zurabishvili declared a state of emergency for COVID-19. The state of emergency was extended for one month, starting on 22 April 2020, and expired on 23 May 2020.
- On 19 March 2020, the Moroccan government declared a "state of health emergency" for COVID-19, to take effect the following day (20 March).
- In November 2019, New South Wales, Australia, declared a seven-day state of emergency, granting "emergency powers" to fire-fighting agencies due to major bushfires occurring in the state.
- In October 2019, Ecuador declared a 60-day state of emergency after violent protests following the ending of fuel subsidies.
- On 18 October 2019, a state of emergency was declared in the capital of Chile, Santiago, after violent protests broke out in response to the rising cost of living. This state of emergency was later extended to other cities in the country. The state of emergency was lifted on 27 October 2019.
- At midnight on 23 April 2019, a state of emergency was declared across Sri Lanka following multiple bomb attacks on churches, luxury hotels and other locations across the country in which 253 people were killed and more than 500 injured. After being extended three times, the state of emergency was lifted on 25 August 2019.
- On 15 February 2019, President Donald Trump declared a national emergency on the U.S. border with Mexico to allocate funds towards a border wall.
- In March 2018 a state of emergency was imposed in Sri Lanka in Kandy for 10 days following clashes between Sinhalese and Muslims.
- In February 2018, Ethiopia declared a six-month-long state of emergency following the resignation of Prime Minister Hailemariam Desalegn.
- Following the 2017 Palm Sunday church bombings in Egypt, President Abdel Fattah el-Sisi declared a nationwide three-month-long state of emergency.
- On 12 August 2017, a state of emergency was declared in the U.S. state of Virginia due to escalating tensions amid protesters and counter-protesters in Charlottesville.
- On 4 September 2016, a state of emergency was declared in the Philippines by President Rodrigo Duterte via Proclamation No. 55 following the 2 September bombings in Davao City that killed 14 people and seriously wounded at least 60 others. His successor, Bongbong Marcos, lifted the declaration through Proclamation No. 298, issued on 25 July 2023.
- On 28 June 2016, Namibia declared a state of emergency due to an ongoing drought.
- On 12 June 2016, following the Orlando nightclub shooting in which at least 50 people were killed (including the shooter), the Governor of Florida declared a state of emergency in the immediate Orlando area.
- In May 2016, Venezuela declared a 60-day state of emergency due to mass protests against the government of President Nicolás Maduro, further fueled by the impeachment process against Brazilian President Dilma Rousseff, which Maduro believes is the result of an American conspiracy to overthrow him.
- On 22 November 2015, a state of emergency was declared in Russian-occupied Crimea after pylons in Ukraine were blown up, leaving 1,896,000 people without power.
- France declared a state of emergency in response to the November 2015 Paris attacks which after five extensions ended in November 2017.
- On 27 April 2015 the U.S. state of Maryland declared a state of emergency and activated the National Guard of the United States, as a direct result of the rioting and widespread physical violence during protesting in Baltimore due to the Death of Freddie Gray.
- In March 2013, Myanmar declared a state of emergency in the city of Meiktila due to ongoing sectarian violence.
- Egypt had been under a nearly-continuous state of emergency since 1967 (interrupted for 18 months in 1980–81); the People's Assembly renewed it every two to three years. The state of emergency expired on 31 May 2012.
- Tunisia declared a state of emergency in January 2011, following unrest from economic issues.
- 28 November 2011 – Slovakia declared a state of emergency for numerous hospitals, due to the resignation of many Medicare workers.
- 21 August 2011 – Trinidad and Tobago, in an attempt to crack down on the trafficking of illegal drugs and firearms, in addition to gangs.
- 15 March 2011 – Bahrain declared a state of emergency on 15 March 2011 and asked the military to reassert its control over the capital, Manama, as clashes between Shia and Sunni groups spread across the country. Bahrain has been gripped by deepening political unrest and widespread protests for over a month, with the Shia majority and some Sunni liberals calling for democracy and an end to discrimination.
- 30 September 2010 – A state of emergency was declared in Ecuador due to a coup by armed forces.
- 11 April 2009 – Thailand's Prime Minister Abhisit Vejjajiva declared a state of emergency in the areas of Pattaya and Chonburi, in response to anti-government protesters breaking into the conference center of a hotel complex in the seaside resort city of Pattaya, in the then-venue site of the ASEAN was being held, immediately resulting in its cancellation. Another state of emergency on 12 April 2009, was announced in Bangkok and the surrounding areas, due to a heightened escalation of tension between the government and anti-government protesters, but was later lifted.
- 5 February 2009 – China was in a state of emergency due to extreme droughts in the country.
- January 2009 – Slovakia was in a state of emergency due to natural gas supply shortage.
- 11 January 2007 – Bangladesh was in a state of emergency due to electoral violence. This ended on 16 December 2008, when new parliamentary elections were organized.
- 26 November 2008 – In Maharashtra state, India, the Maharashtra Government declared a state of Emergency following the 2008 Mumbai attacks.
- 2 September 2008 – A state of emergency was declared in Bangkok by Prime Minister Samak Sundaravej following civil unrest; it was lifted on 14 September 2008.
- 1 July 2008 – Mongolian president Nambaryn Enkhbayar declared a state of emergency in the capital Ulaanbaatar for four days after violent protests against the ex-communist Mongolian People's Revolutionary Party (MPRP). The MPRP had claimed a majority of seats in the 2008 parliamentary elections, but was accused of fraud and vote rigging by the less-successful parties.
- March 2008 – Armenia was in a state of emergency from 2 March 2008 to 20 March 2008, declared by President Robert Kocharyan in response to protests over the 2008 Armenian presidential elections.
- 3 November 2007 – Pakistan was in a state of emergency from 3 November 2007 to 15 December 2007. President Pervez Musharraf declared emergency "to stop Pakistan from committing suicide". He lifted the state of emergency after he resigned from the army and took the oath of office as a civilian President of Pakistan.
- 24 February 2006 – the Philippines declared a state of emergency via Philippine Proclamation 1017 for one week until Philippine Proclamation 1021 on 3 March 2006, in response to a supposed coup against President Gloria Macapagal Arroyo's government in the midst of the 20th anniversary of the 1986 People Power Revolution that toppled the rule of Ferdinand Marcos.
- 28 August 2005 – A state of emergency was declared in Louisiana because of Hurricane Katrina. See National Weather Service bulletin for Hurricane Katrina.
- August 2005 – Portugal declares a state of emergency in response to wildfires.
- Mid-August 2005 – Sucumbios and Orellana, two provinces of Ecuador, because of indigenous protests against oil firms
- 15 April 2005 – Quito, capital of Ecuador due to protests; lifted less than a day later, on 17 April 2005.
- December 2004 – Sri Lanka, Indonesia and Maldives because of the tsunami.
- November 2003 – Georgia, following weeks of civil unrest.
- August 2003 – Michigan, Ohio, New York, United States, and Ontario, Canada, in response to the Northeast blackout of 2003.
- March 2003 – Serbia after assassination of Zoran Đinđić (vanredno stanje).
- 15 July 2002 – Paraguay, in response to public unrest.
- November 2001 – Nepal, in response to increased guerrilla activity.
- 30 November 1999 – The U.S. city of Seattle, Washington, stemming from protest of the WTO Ministerial Conference of 1999 and police reaction to it – known as the 1999 Seattle WTO protests.
- May–June 1998 – Indonesia declares state of emergency, due to May 1998 riots of Indonesia.
- 2 March 1997 – The 1997 Albanian civil unrest, also known as the Lottery Uprising or Anarchy in Albania, in which a Ponzi scheme sparked an uprising. Albania descended into anarchy and violence in which the government was toppled, and some 2,000 people were killed. On 1 March, Prime Minister Aleksandër Meksi resigned, and on 2 March, President Sali Berisha declared a state of emergency.
- 5 August 1995 – Trinidad and Tobago to remove Speaker of the House Occah Seapaul who refused to resign.
- Winter 1995 – The U.S. city of Sault Ste. Marie, Michigan, after a severe snowstorm buried the city in 6 feet (1.8 m) of snow.
- April–May 1992 – California, United States. state of emergency was declared by Los Angeles Mayor Tom Bradley in response to the 1992 Los Angeles riots, which were caused by the acquittal of the Los Angeles Police Department officers who had been seen on tape beating Rodney King.
- March 1992 – Republic of Moldova, in response to War of Transnistria.
- 1992 to 2011 – Algeria endures a 19-year state of emergency enacted at the beginning of the 1992 coup. The state of emergency, which suspended citizens' rights in lieu of military power, was lifted after the Algerian Government gave in to protester demands during the 2011 Arab Spring.
- May 1994 – On 4 May, Yemeni President Ali Abdullah Saleh declared a 30-day state of emergency in response to the bombing of Sana'a by separatist air forces during the escalating civil war, and foreign nationals began evacuating the country.
- August 1991 – Soviet Union, enemies of Mikhail Gorbachev's glasnost and perestroika reforms evoked the state of emergency because Gorbachev, according to them, was destroying both communism and the state itself. The coup was led by the acting president of the Soviet Union, Gennady Yanayev.
- July–August 1990 – Trinidad and Tobago declared a state of emergency when a group stormed Parliament and a TV Station holding government officials, including the prime minister, at ransom. See Jamaat al Muslimeen coup attempt
- July 1985 to February 1990 – South Africa, in response to increasing civil unrest and township violence opposing apartheid rule.
- 1975 to 1977 – India, Indira Gandhi declared a state of emergency in 1975 in response to political opposition and her own conviction on charges of electoral fraud. The Emergency lasted for 21 months.
- 1972 to 1976 – Mauritius, due to ethnic and labor-related unrest. Elections were suspended during this period, and political rights were broadly circumscribed.
- 1971 – Queensland, Australia, in response to fears over increasing protests over the 1971 South Africa rugby union tour of Australia
- 1970 to 1972 – Trinidad and Tobago; a state of emergency was declared to deal with the Black Power Revolution, which also included a mutiny in the Military.
- 1972 – the United Kingdom in response to increasingly militant industrial action.
- October 1970 – Quebec in response to the October Crisis kidnappings of government officials.
- July 1967 – Detroit, United States in response to the 12th Street riot started on Sunday morning during a blind pig raid.
- October 1962 – United States in response to the Cuban Missile Crisis.
- 1963 to 2011 – Syria during the Arab–Israeli conflict.
- 1948 to 1960 – Malayan Emergency in Malaysia and Singapore
- 1958 – Malta due to riots against the colonial government following Prime Minister Dom Mintoff's resignation.
- 1950 to 1978 – United States due to the Cold War, specifically the threat of "world conquest by communist imperialism."
- 1948 to 1991 – China declared a state of emergency in response to the communist insurgency during the Chinese Civil War. Martial law was declared in both Mainland China and Taiwan, the latter following the February 28 incident in 1947 but was lifted in 1987. Eventually, mainland China fell to the victorious Communists led by Mao Zedong, who established the People's Republic of China in 1949.
- 1939 to 1952 – United States due to World War II
- 1941 to 1942 – Moscow due to the German advance to within 19 miles (31 km) of the city during World War II.
- October 1936 – Spain in response to the proclamation of the Catalan State and the ongoing Asturian miners' strike of 1934.
- 18 March 1907 – Moldavia and Wallachia in Romania during the 1907 Romanian Peasants' Revolt.

== See also ==
- Arbitrary arrest and detention
- Article 48 (Weimar Constitution)
- Continuity of Government Plan
- Due process
- Force majeure
- International humanitarian law
- Martial law
- Search and seizure
- Senate Report 93-549
- Snow emergency
- State of exception
- Unitary executive theory
- Presidential Emergency Action Documents

== Bibliography ==
- Agamben, Giorgio (2005). State of Exception. Chicago: University of Chicago Press. ISBN 978-0-226-00925-4. Excerpt online: "A Brief History of the State of Exception".
- Barzilai, Gad (1996). Wars, Internal Conflicts, and Political Order. Albany: State University of New York Press. ISBN 0-7914-2943-1.
- Walter Benjamin, Zur Kritik der Gewalt ("Critique of Violence").
- Fabbri, Lorenzo. "Chronotopologies of the Exception. Agamben and Derrida before the Camps", Diacritics, Volume 39, Number 3 (2009): 77–95.
- Hederman, Anthony J.; Committee to Review the Offences against the State Acts 1939 to 1998 (August 2002). "Report" (PDF).
- Carl Schmitt, On Dictatorship and Political Theology.
- Wolf, Conradin (2005). Ausnahmezustand und Menschenrecht.
- Hussein, Nassar (2003). The Jurisprudence of Emergency. Ann Arbor: University of Michigan Press.
- Rooney, Bryan. 2019. "Emergency powers in democratic states: Introducing the Democratic Emergency Powers dataset." Research & Politics.
