= Fuad Abu Bakr =

Trinidadian politician

Personal details
- Born: 30 August 1985 (age 41)
- Party: New National Vision
- Other political affiliations: Jamaat al Muslimeen
- Spouse(s): Kristy Ramnarine (2015), Denecia John (2020)
- Relations: Radanfah Abu Bakr (brother)
- Parent(s): Yasin and Atiyah Abu Bakr
- Education: Queen's Royal College; Kingston University; City, University of London

Fuad Abu Bakr (born 30 August 1985) is a Trinidad and Tobago politician, businessman and community activist who is the leader of the New National Vision political party.

== Early life and education ==
Fuad Abu Bakr was born in 1985, the son of Yasin Abu Bakr, head of the Jamaat al Muslimeen, and his wife Atiyah (formerly Grace Telesford). He is one of his father's 15 children. When Abu Bakr was four his father attempted to overthrow the government of Trinidad and Tobago.

Abu Bakr completed his secondary education at Queen's Royal College in Port of Spain, and then spent two years studying Arabic and Islamic jurisprudence at the Islamic Call Society's college in Libya. He later studied at Kingston University and at the City, University of London, both in the United Kingdom.

== Political career ==
Fuad Abu Bakr is the political leader of the New National Vision.

Under Abu Bakr's leadership, the NNV contested 12 of 41 seats in the 2010 general elections. Abu Bakr was a candidate for the Port of Spain North/Saint Ann's West, and placed third, receiving 93 of 13,344 votes cast.

In the 2015 general elections Abu Bakr contested the Diego Martin West seat and came fourth of six candidates. He received 194 of 17,026 votes cast. In the 2020 general elections he ran for the Port of Spain South seat and came fourth. He received 147 of 10,452 votes cast.

Abu Bakr was arrested on 30 June 2020 during riots in Port of Spain over the killing of three men, Joel Jacob, Noel Diamond and Israel Clinton, by police. He was charged with "using violent language to provoke persons to commit a breach of the peace" and breaking regulations associated with the COVID-19 pandemic. He was also charged with obstructing a police officer, and three counts of assaulting a police officer in connection with a Black Lives Matter protest earlier that month in Port of Spain. His father, Yasin Abu Bakr, claimed his son has been trying to calm protestors, not incite them, when he was arrested. Charges against Abu Bakr stemming from the BLM protest was dismissed in May 2023 after the police officer who filed the charges repeatedly failed to appear in court.

In the 2025 general elections he is a candidate for the Port of Spain South seat representing the NNV. He was the party's only candidate, and has endorsed the UNC as "best hope for poor and disenfranchised citizens". On 9 April he led a protest in east Port of Spain against Keith Scotland, the member of parliament for Port of Spain South, questioning the ruling People's National Movement's commitment to "uplift[ing] African people" what it meant to be a "PNM stronghold".

== Personal life ==
Abu Bakr is married to Kristy Ramnarine, a television producer at CNC3. Footballer Radanfah Abu Bakr is one of his brothers.

== Electoral history ==
2025 Trinidad and Tobago general election: Port of Spain South
Party	Candidate	Votes	%	±%
PNM	Keith Scotland	5,523	59.9%	▼
COP	Kirt Sinnette	2,218	24.1%	Steady
PF	Winzy Adams	670	7.3%	Steady
NTA	Gail Gonsalves-Castanada	352	3.8%	Steady
NNV	Fuad Abu Bakr	268	2.9%	Steady
All People's Party (Trinidad and Tobago)	Kezel Jackson	149	1.6%	Steady
Majority		3,305	35.8%	▼
Turnout		9,215	36.09%	
Registered electors		25,534		
PNM hold				
