= Marlene McDonald =

Trinidad and Tobago politician (1969–2023)

The Honourable Marlene McDonald MP
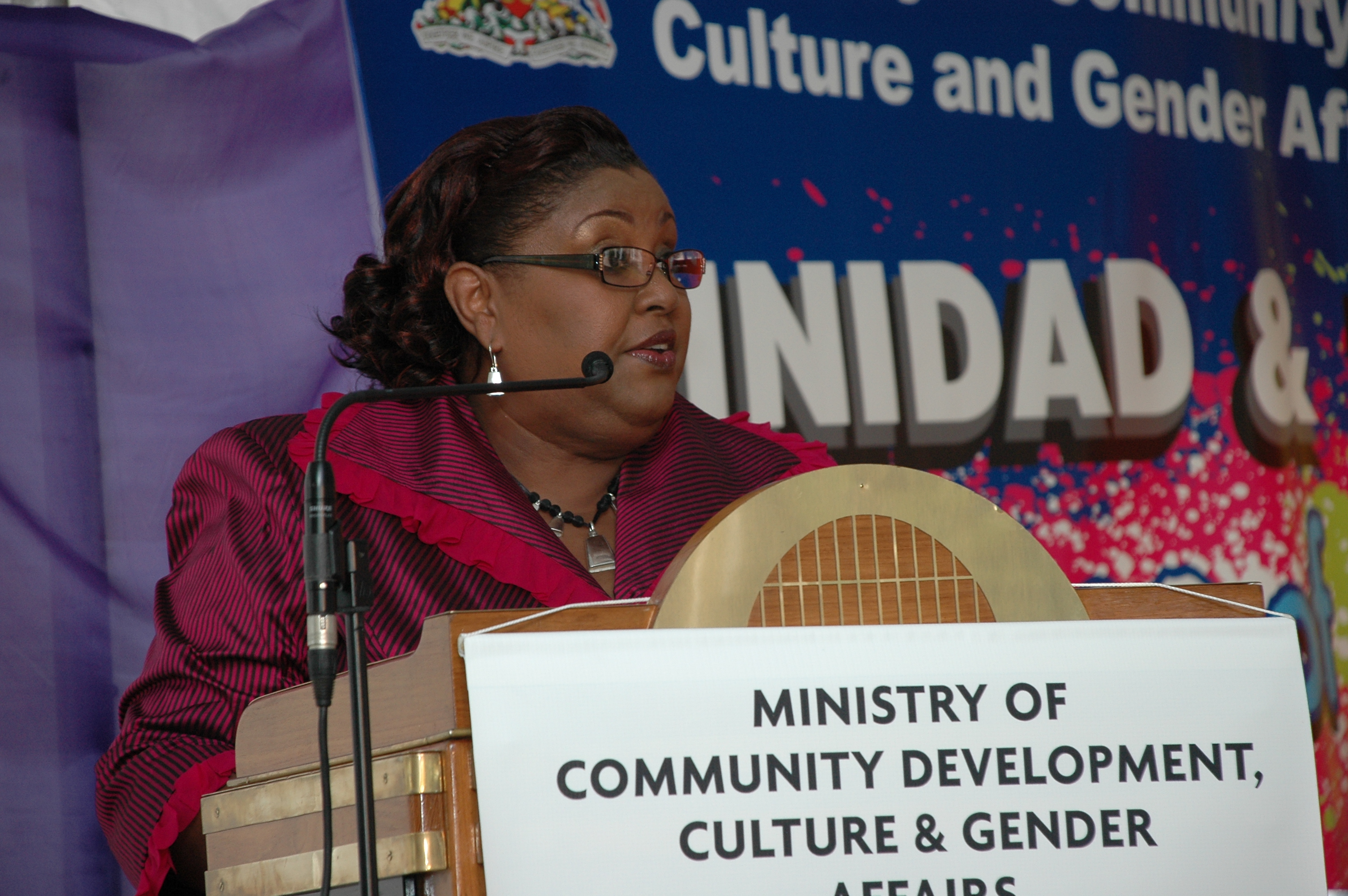
- McDonald in 2009

Member of Parliament for Port of Spain South
- In office 2007–2020
- Preceded by: Eric A. Williams
- Succeeded by: Keith Scotland

Personal details
- Born: 1959
- Died: 8 December 2023 (aged 64)
- Party: People's National Movement
- Domestic partner: Michael Carew
- Education: University of the West Indies

Marlene McDonald (1959 – 8 December 2023) was a Trinidad and Tobago politician from the People's National Movement (PNM).

== Early life ==
McDonald attended Nelson Street Girls' RC Primary School and St François Girls' College. She later studied law at the University of the West Indies at Cave Hill.

== Career ==
McDonald was first elected to the House of Representatives as member for Port of Spain South in the 2007 Trinidad and Tobago general election. She was appointed Minister of Community Development, Culture and Gender Affairs. When her party was returned to Opposition in 2010, she took the parliamentary role of opposition Chief Whip. When the party returned to power in 2015, McDonald was made housing minister. She held the position until March 2016.

In March 2018, the Prime Minister appointed McDonald a minister in the Ministry of Public Administration. In 2019, McDonald was charged with six counts of money laundering, conspiracy to defraud and misbehaviour in public office. The charges were later dropped.

She retired at the 2020 Trinidad and Tobago general election.

== Death ==
McDonald died on 8 December 2023, at St Clair Medical Centre in Port of Spain, at the age of 64.

Her funeral was held at the Cathedral of the Immaculate Conception in Port of Spain. She was buried at the Western Cemetery in St James.
