= Yasin Abu Bakr =

Trinidadian Islamic leader (1941–2021)

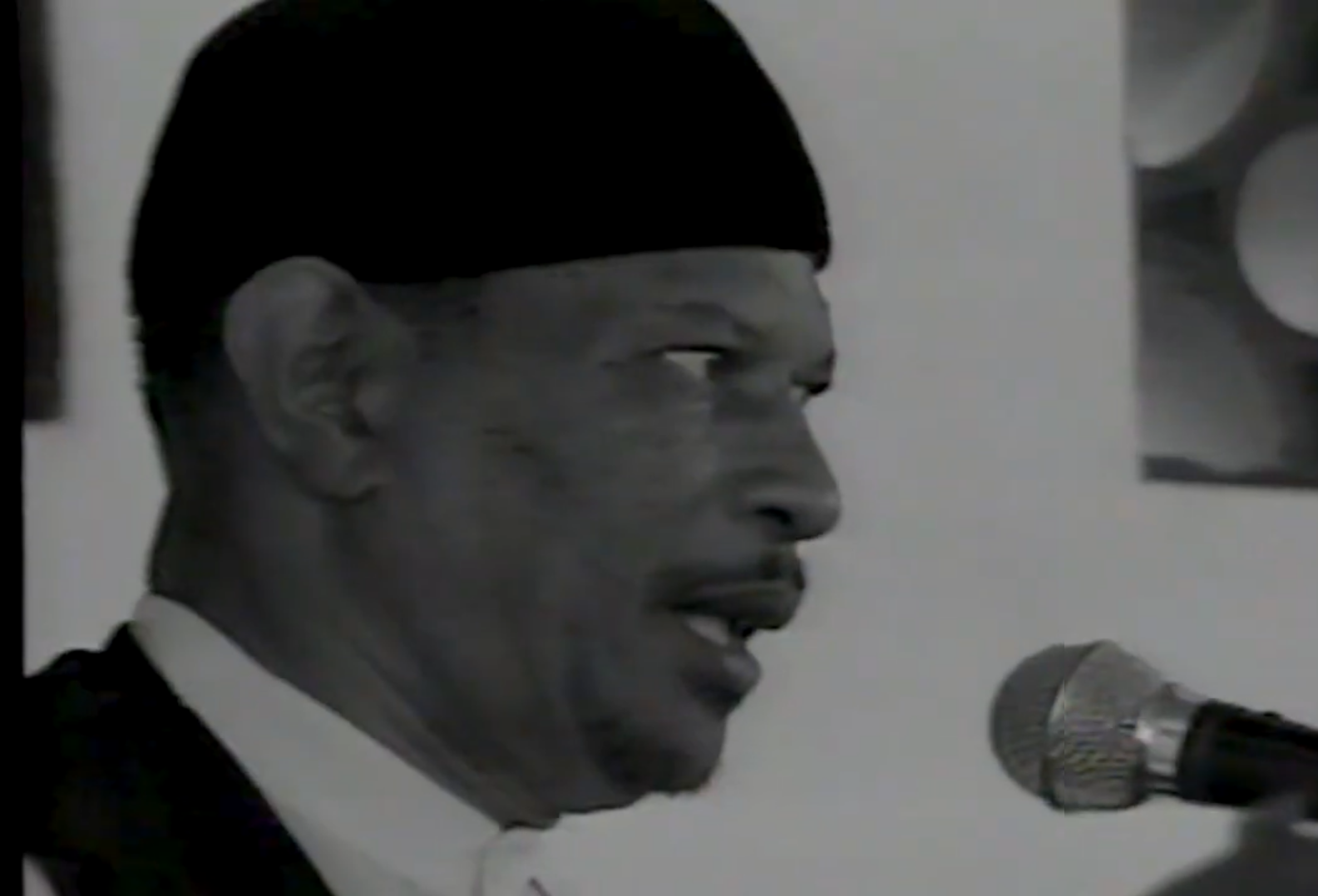
- Yasin Abu Bakr speaking
- Born: Lennox Philip; 19 October 1941; Port of Spain, Trinidad and Tobago
- Died: 21 October 2021 (aged 80)
- Education: Queen's Royal College
- Political party: Jamaat al Muslimeen
- Children: 15, including Fuad and Radanfah

Yasin Abu Bakr (born Lennox Philip; 19 October 1941 – 21 October 2021) was a Trinidadian radical Islamist leader and militant who founded and led the Jamaat al Muslimeen, an Afro-Trinidadian Muslim group in Trinidad and Tobago. He is best known for orchestrating the 1990 coup d’état, during which he and over 100 armed members of his group stormed the Parliament (Red House) and state television station, holding Prime Minister A.N.R. Robinson and several cabinet members hostage for six days.

== Life ==
Abu Bakr was born Lennox Philip in Trinidad and Tobago and grew up in a suburb of Port-of-Spain as the eighth of fifteen children. He graduated from Queen's Royal College, and spent time during his tertiary studies in Toronto, Canada.

Abu Bakr converted to Islam, although there are two conflicting descriptions of how it took place. One story states it occurred in 1969 after an Egyptian preacher visited Trinidad. The other story states it occurred in the early 1970s while still in Canada, and that he returned to Trinidad already converted in 1973. He changed his name shortly after converting.

In the 1970s he lived in Libya as a guest of Muammar Gaddafi. Upon his return to Trinidad and Tobago he founded the Jamaat al Muslimeen.

Abu Bakr collapsed and died at his home on 21 October 2021 at the age of 80.

== Coup ==
In 1990, 100 of Abu Bakr's followers stormed the Parliament of Trinidad and Tobago and took the Prime Minister A. N. R. Robinson hostage. Abu Bakr surrendered to police six days later, and spent two years in jail.

== Personal life ==
Abu Bakr had four wives including Annisa Abu Bakr, an economist, Atiyah Abu Bakr, and Indrani Maharaj-Abu Bakr, an attorney and 15 children: nine daughters and six sons.

His son Fuad later embarked on a political course, eventually becoming the leader of the New National Vision party, a minor political party founded in 1994 in Trinidad and Tobago. He unsuccessfully ran for a seat in the 2020 general elections. Another of his sons, Radanfah, played football professionally.
