= Port of Spain South =

Trinidad and Tobago parliamentary constituency

- Constituency for the Parliament of Trinidad and Tobago
- Port of Spain South is number 4 on this map
- Electorate: 23,711 (2010)
- Major settlements: Port of Spain

Current constituency
- Created: 1956
- Number of members: 1
- Member of Parliament: Keith Scotland (UNC)

Port of Spain South is a parliamentary constituency in Trinidad and Tobago.

== Geography ==
The constituency covers southern areas of the city of Port of Spain. It had an electorate of 23,711 as of 2010.

== Members ==
Election	Member	Party	Notes
1956	Patrick Vincent Joseph Solomon	PNM	
1961	Eric Williams	PNM	
1966	Eric Williams	PNM	
1971	Eric Williams	PNM	
1976	Eric Williams	PNM	
1981	Ronald J. Williams	PNM	
1986	Theodore Guerra	NAR	
1991	Jean Pierre	PNM	
1995	Eric A. Williams	PNM	
2000	Eric A. Williams	PNM	
2001	Eric A. Williams	PNM	
2002	Eric A. Williams	PNM	
2007	Marlene McDonald	PNM	
2010	Marlene McDonald	PNM	
2015	Marlene McDonald	PNM	
2020	Keith Scotland	PNM	
2025	Keith Scotland	PNM	

== Elections ==
2025 Trinidad and Tobago general election: Port of Spain South
Party	Candidate	Votes	%	±%
PNM	Keith Scotland	5,523	59.9%	▼
COP	Kirt Sinnette	2,218	24.1%	Steady
PF	Winzy Adams	670	7.3%	Steady
NTA	Gail Gonsalves-Castanada	352	3.8%	Steady
NNV	Fuad Abu Bakr	268	2.9%	Steady
All People's Party (Trinidad and Tobago)	Kezel Jackson	149	1.6%	Steady
Majority		3,305	35.8%	▼
Turnout		9,215	36.09%	
Registered electors		25,534		
PNM hold				
