= Keith Scotland =

Trinidad and Tobago politician

Member of Parliament for Port of Spain South
- Incumbent
- Assumed office 10 August 2020
- Preceded by: Marlene McDonald

Personal details
- Party: People's National Movement

Keith Scotland is a Trinidad and Tobago politician from the People's National Movement. He has been MP for Port of Spain South in the House of Representatives since 2020.

Scotland is a lawyer and senior counsel. In July 2024, he was named a minister in the Ministry of National Security.

== Electoral history ==
2025 Trinidad and Tobago general election: Port of Spain South
Party	Candidate	Votes	%	±%
PNM	Keith Scotland	5,523	59.9%	▼
COP	Kirt Sinnette	2,218	24.1%	Steady
PF	Winzy Adams	670	7.3%	Steady
NTA	Gail Gonsalves-Castanada	352	3.8%	Steady
NNV	Fuad Abu Bakr	268	2.9%	Steady
All People's Party (Trinidad and Tobago)	Kezel Jackson	149	1.6%	Steady
Majority		3,305	35.8%	▼
Turnout		9,215	36.09%	
Registered electors		25,534		
PNM hold				

== See also ==
- 12th Republican Parliament of Trinidad and Tobago
- 13th Republican Parliament of Trinidad and Tobago
