= Sarah Stuart-Black =

New Zealand official

Sarah Stuart-Black QSO
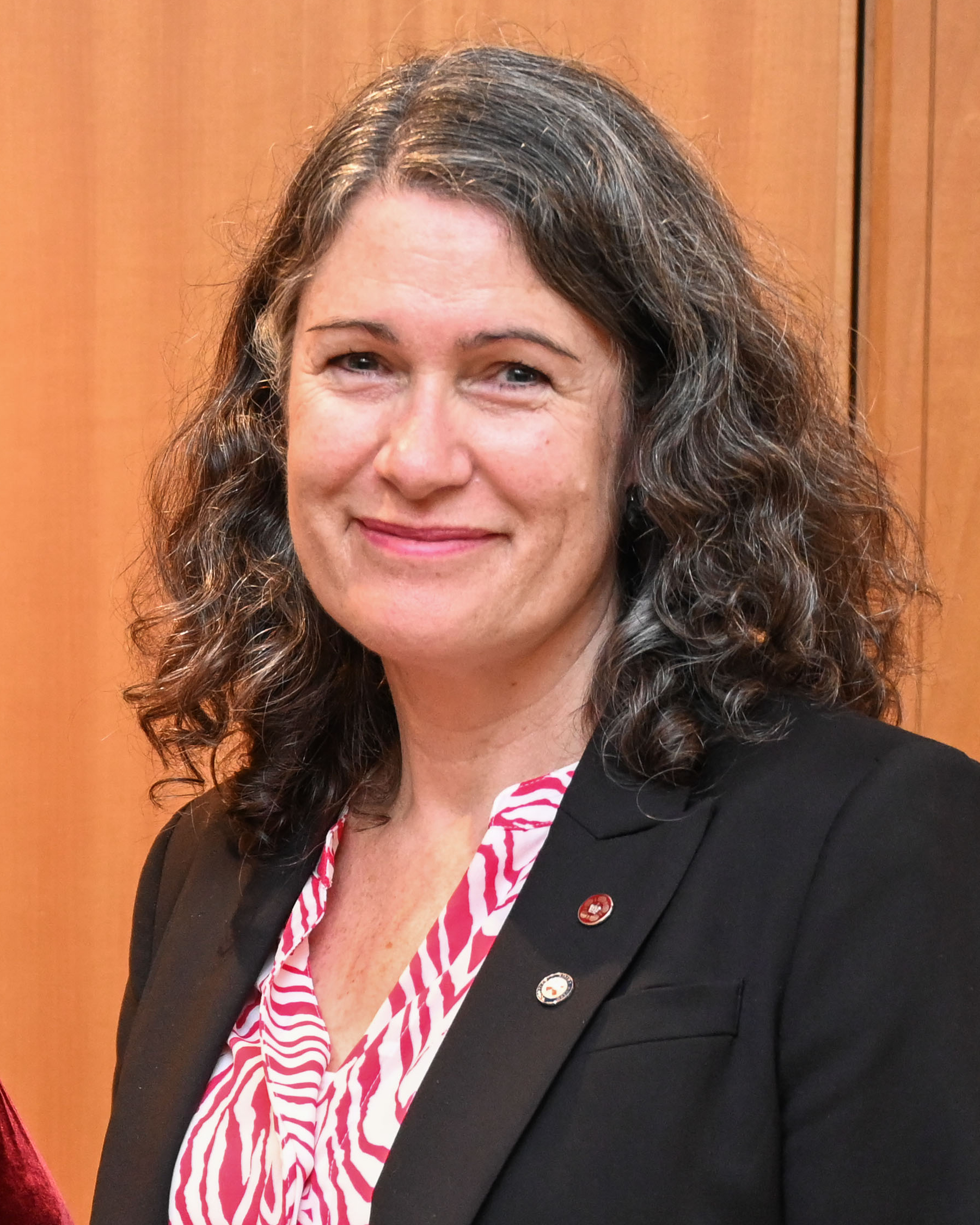
- Stuart-Black in 2024
- Born: Sarah Ann Norman; 1972 (age 53–54)
- Other names: Norm
- Occupation: Secretary General of New Zealand Red Cross

Sarah Ann "Norm" Stuart-Black QSO (née Norman; born 1972) is a New Zealand official, prominent in the fields of emergency management and humanitarian relief. On 7 December 2020, Stuart-Black took up the role of Secretary General of the New Zealand Red Cross.

== Biography ==
Stuart-Black originally trained as a nurse, completing her qualification in 1993. She then worked in New Zealand and England as a nurse. In 1997 she returned to university and completed a bachelor's degree and a master's degree in disaster management. She was a member of the United Nations Disaster Assessment and Coordination Team for nine years and has worked in Ethiopia, Niue and the Solomon Islands.

Stuart-Black joined the New Zealand National Emergency Management Agency Te Rākau Whakamarumaru in 2003, and in December 2014 she was appointed director of Civil Defence and Emergency Management. She led the Civil Defence response to the 2016 Kaikōura earthquake, the 2017 Port Hills fires, the 2019 Christchurch mosque attacks and Whakaari / White Island eruption, and the 2020 response to the coronavirus disease in New Zealand.

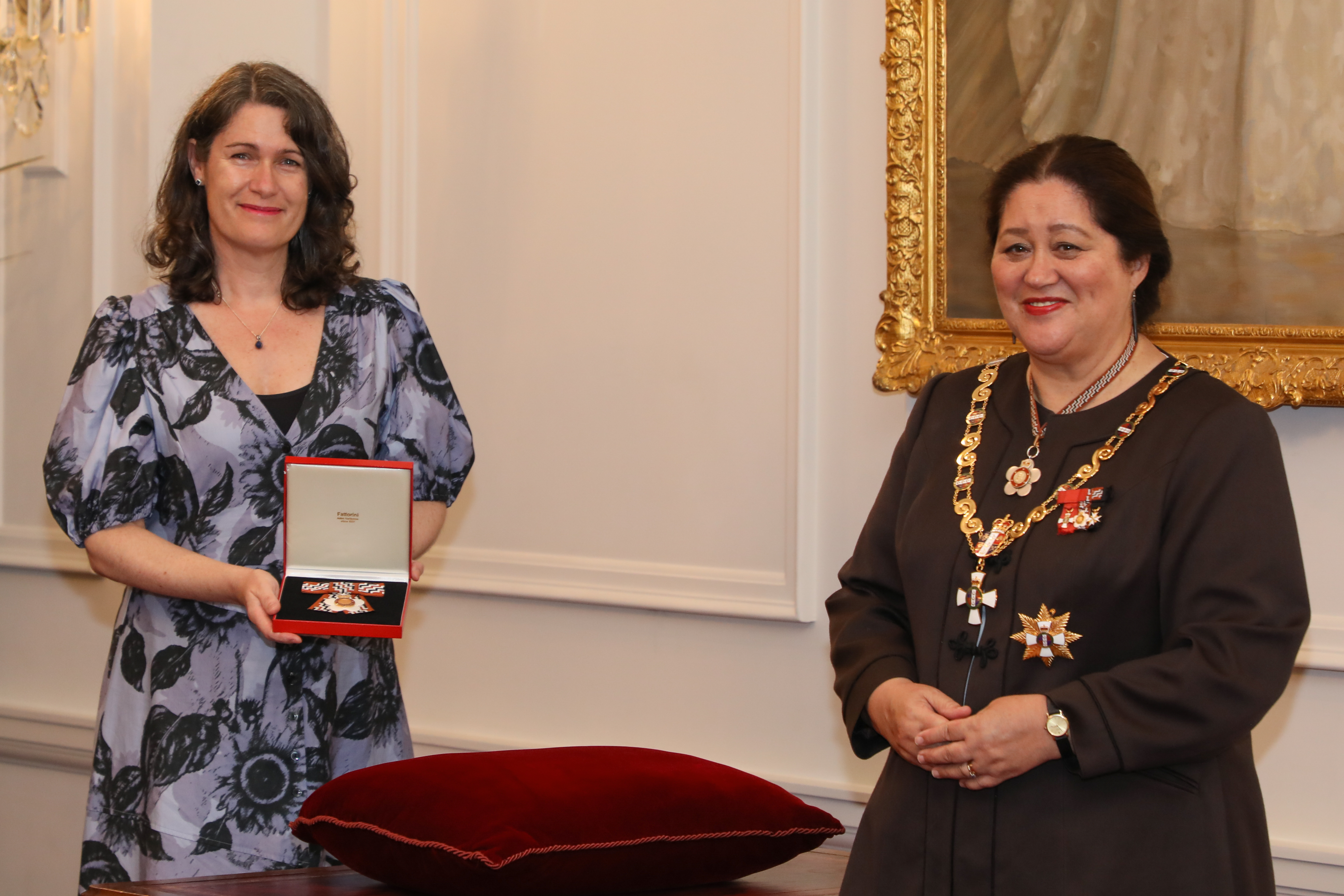
Stuart-Black (left), after her investiture as a Companion of the Queen's Service Order by the governor-general, Dame Cindy Kiro at Government House, Wellington, on 7 December 2021

In the 2021 Queen's Birthday Honours, Stuart-Black was appointed a Companion of the Queen's Service Order, for services to emergency management.

=== Origins of "Norm" ===
Stuart-Black is widely known as "Norm", including by the Prime Minister of New Zealand. In an introductory video to members of the New Zealand Red Cross shortly after taking up the post of Secretary General, Stuart-Black attributes the nickname "Norm" as an enduring professional moniker to her having started working at the Ministry of Civil Defence and being sat next to another Sarah. "After 10 minutes," Stuart-Black said, they decided that the confusion was "never going to work" and she took to being referred to as "Norm", a nickname derived from her maiden name.

== Publications ==
- Norman, S., & Talib, A. (2005). Improving child survival in Ethiopia: Needs assessment for the Ethiopian health care system. Cambridge, Mass: John F. Kennedy School of Government.
- Stuart-Black, J., Coles, E., Norman, S.; Disaster research and the social sciences: lessons learned and future trajectories. (1 January 2005). Bridging the divide from theory to practice. International Journal of Mass Emergencies and Disasters.
- Stuart-Black, S., Stuart-Black, J., Coles, E., & Health Protection Agency (Great Britain). (2008). Health emergency planning: A handbook for practitioners. London: TSO.
