= Radanfah Abu Bakr =

Trinidadian footballer (born 1987)

Personal information
- Full name: Radanfah Abu Bakr
- Date of birth: 12 February 1987 (age 39)
- Place of birth: Port of Spain, Trinidad and Tobago
- Height: 1.98 m (6 ft 6 in)
- Position: Centre-back

Youth career
- 2002–2005: Queen's Royal College
- 2005: Caledonia AIA

Senior career*
Years	Team	Apps	(Gls)
2006–2009	Caledonia AIA	22	(0)
2009	Swansea City	0	(0)
2010–2011	Joe Public	3	(0)
2011	Olympic Charleroi	4	(0)
2012–2013	Caledonia AIA		
2013	Vostok	27	(1)
2014	Kruoja Pakruojis	23	(2)
2015–2016	HB Køge	19	(1)
2016	Sillamäe Kalev	15	(1)
2017	Sūduva Marijampolė	22	(2)
2018	PS TIRA	16	(1)
2019–2020	Churchill Brothers	11	(1)
2023–	AC Port of Spain		

International career^{‡}
2009–2022	Trinidad and Tobago	36	(2)
- * Club domestic league appearances and goals as of 9 December 2018 ‡ National team caps and goals as of 24 January 2017

Radanfah Abu Bakr (born 12 February 1987) is a Trinidadian professional footballer who plays as a centre-back for TT Premier Football League club AC Port of Spain.

== Club career ==
Abu Bakr went to Queen's Royal College in Trinidad and began his career in Trinidad and Tobago side Caledonia AIA, before signing for Swansea City on 30 August 2009, in a short-term loan deal until 1 January 2010. He has been signed to help relieve the injury crisis at the club. He previously had two trial spells at the club, in 2007 and in 2008, but was unable to sign for the Swans after they were denied a work permit. Bakr started his career at a relatively late age which he has put down to him deciding to put his head down and study, he took a degree in business management in Kingston University in London.

In August 2009, a work permit was arranged for the UK, and Radanfah signed a three-month contract with Swansea on 1 September 2009. After this deal expired he was not offered terms to extend his stay and so returned to Trinidad to sign for Joe Public. On 21 July 2011, he was signed by Belgium club Olympic Charleroi after a successful trial. He left Olympic Charleroi and returned to Caledonia AIA during the 2012 season. Abu Bakr helped Caledonia AIA win the 2012 CFU Club Championship on 21 June 2012. He scored his side's goal in a 1–1 draw after extra time against W Connection, with Caledonia AIA winning 4–2 on penalty kicks.

In February 2013 Abu Bakr moved to Kazakhstan Premier League side Vostok. He played 28 league games for Vostok before moving to Lithuanian A Lyga side Kruoja a year later.

On 2 February 2015, he signed a contract with Danish club HB Køge.

In July 2016, Abu Bakr signed with Estonian top division club JK Sillamäe Kalev.

On 25 February 2017, he joined Lithuanian A Lyga side Sūduva Marijampolė.

On 6 September 2019 Abu Bakr penned deal with I-League side and is currently playing for Churchill Brothers.

== International career ==
Abu Bakr made his debut for the Trinidad and Tobago national team on 30 July 2008, coming on as a substitute in a friendly against Haiti. Another substitute appearance followed two weeks later in a friendly against El Salvador.

He would have to wait until June 2009 for his next international; making his first start and competitive appearance in a World Cup qualifier against Mexico, losing 2–1. Abu Bakr scored his first international goal a month later in a 3–2 friendly win against Saint Kitts and Nevis. He went on to play in a further four of Trinidad and Tobago's qualifiers for the 2010 World Cup, but lost his place in the side after that.

Abu Bakr returned to the international side in June 2013 as part of Trinidad and Tobago's build up to the 2013 CONCACAF Gold Cup, playing in friendlies away against Romania and Estonia. He was selected for his nation's squad for the tournament, and helped them reach the quarter-finals where they lost narrowly to Mexico.

== Career statistics ==
=== Club ===
Club statistics
Club	Season	League		National Cup		League Cup		Other		Total	
Club	Season	Apps	Goals	Apps	Goals	Apps	Goals	Apps	Goals	Apps	Goals
Swansea City	2009–10	0	0	0	0	0	0	0	0	0	0
Joe Public F.C.	2010–11	2	0	0	0	0	0	5	2	7	2
Olympic Charleroi	2011–12	4	0	0	0	0	0	0	0	4	0
Caledonia AIA	2011–12	?	1	0	0	0	0	4	2	4+	3
Caledonia AIA	2012–13	?	1	0	0	0	0	3	0	3+	1
Vostok	2013	28	1	1	0	0	0	0	0	29	1
Kruoja	2014	23	2	1	0	0	0	0	0	24	2
HB Køge	2014–15	8	1	0	0	0	0	0	0	8	1
Total		65+	6	2	0	0	0	12	4	79+	10

=== International ===
Trinidad and Tobago football team
Year	Apps	Goals
2008	2	0
2009	6	1
2013	9	0
2014	1	0
2015	8	1
2016	7	0
2017	2	0
Total	35	2

Statistics accurate as of match played 8 January 2017

=== International goals ===
Updated to games played 8 June 2014

#	Date	Venue	Cap	Opponent	Score	Result	Competition	Ref.
1	12 July 2009	Warner Park, Basseterre, Saint Kitts and Nevis	4	Saint Kitts and Nevis	1–0	3–2	Friendly	
2	8 October 2015	Estadio Rommel Fernández, Panama City, Panama	23	Panama	2–0	2–1	Friendly	

== Personal life ==
Radanfah is the son of Yasin Abu Bakr.
