= Israeli state of emergency =

Legal situation in Israel

The Israeli state of emergency was originally authorized under Section 9 of the Law and Administration Ordinance – 1948, and has been in continuous effect in the State of Israel since.

== Statutory authorization ==
The Law and Administration Ordinance – 1948 served as the original authorization for the Israeli state of emergency. This statute was adopted by the Israeli Provisional State Council — which functioned as the transitional legislative authority of the new Israeli state — on May 19, 1948, and was intended as a temporary measure by the council. Section 9 of the Ordinance empowered the council to declare a state of emergency, during which the Prime Minister and cabinet Ministers have the authority to promulgate emergency regulations that “seem to him expedient in the interests of defense of the State, public security and the maintenance of supplies and essential services.” Emergency regulations created under this law expire after three months, but the Law and Administration Ordinance did not impose a sunset period on the state of emergency it authorized, and the Knesset never terminated it. In 1992, the Knesset formally moved the authorization for the state of emergency from the Law and Administration Ordinance – 1948 to the Basic Law: The Government, and this authorization currently rests on §38 of Basic Law: The Government (2001). In contrast to the Law and Administration Ordinance, Basic Law: The Government (2001) §38(b) limits all declarations of a state of emergency to one year, but they may be renewed without limit, which the Knesset has done without exception.

== Impacts on the separation of powers ==
Until the 1980s, ministers faced few practical constraints on their use of emergency regulations even outside of the immediate security context of the state of emergency, with all 204 regulations issued between 1974 and 1982 relating to labor disputes and economic issues. These regulations were largely unchallenged by the judiciary until the cases of Paritzki v. Minister of the Interior and Poraz v. Mayor of Tel Aviv. The Paritzki case directly addressed the significant use of emergency regulations outside the scope of the actual emergency that justified the state of exception, stating that emergency regulations can only address issues that the emergency directly prevents the Knesset from addressing. The Poraz case built on this judicial limitation on the Government, stating that the Government and its ministers cannot enact emergency regulations that impinge on policy areas on which the Knesset is already in the process of legislating. While this provided some limitation on the Government's ability to use emergency regulations to avoid the ordinary legislative process in the Knesset, the Government continued to use emergency regulations to legislate on labor and economic issues through the 1990s.

Basic Law: The Government (1992) imposed important limitations on the use of emergency regulations absent from the Law and Administration Ordinance – 1948 and provided the Knesset with a number of oversight functions over the Government's use of emergency regulations and the state of emergency itself.

== Knesset entrenchment of laws against emergency regulation ==
Section 39(c) of the same Basic Law both serves to empower the Government to adopt emergency regulations affecting any provision of law while allowing the Knesset to entrench any law against modification or suspension by emergency regulation, stating that the Government's emergency regulatory is unlimited “unless there be another provision by law." The Knesset subsequently incorporated entrenchment provisions into a number of Basic Laws, preventing the Government from modifying them via emergency regulation. These entrenchment provisions appear mostly in the Basic Laws affecting the different branches of the Israeli state, entrenching the Israeli form of government against modification during a state of emergency.

== Knesset oversight of states of emergency and emergency regulations ==
Sections 39(a) and 39(f) of Basic Law: The Government (2001) work together to give the Knesset oversight of Government emergency regulations by requiring such regulations be immediately tabled in the Knesset Foreign Affairs and Security Committee, where they can be revoked by a majority of the Knesset. The Supreme Court has emphasized the importance of Knesset oversight of government emergency regulations even in novel contexts, requiring in Ben Meir v. Prime Minister that the Government halt its reliance on emergency regulations to institute contact tracing requirements during the COVID-19 pandemic if the Knesset failed to rapidly establish a committee capable of overseeing emergency pandemic regulations within five days of the Court's decision.

While the Knesset possesses multiple formal mechanisms to exercise oversight of the government during the state of emergency, some Israeli constitutional scholars argue that MKs’ ability to exercise such oversight is limited even in normal times by the parties’ ability to discipline their members. Given that the Government serves with the confidence of the Knesset, upheld by parties forming a majority in that body, the Knesset's oversight of the Government is highly limited in practice.

== Legal recourse and the principle of proportionality ==
Section 39 of Basic Law: The Government (2001) addresses the use of emergency regulations and creates the legal basis for judicial review of emergency regulations.

Section 39(e) imposes a requirement of proportionality, requiring the government only adopt emergency regulations to the extent that the emergency cannot be addressed through an ordinary legislative or regulatory process. This clause is a partial incorporation into the Basic Law of the case law generated by the Paritzki and Poraz decisions.

Some constitutional scholars also argue that this provision should be interpreted as an incorporation of Israel's treaty obligation to adhere to the principle of proportionality in utilizing states of emergency under the International Covenant on Civil and Political Rights (ICCPR), as Basic Law: The Government (1992), which contains the original text of what is now section 39 of Basic Law: The Government (2001), was adopted shortly after Israel ratified the ICCPR. The jurisprudence of the European Court of Human Rights, which the Israeli Supreme Court has cited in interpreting Israel human rights obligations, suggests that the principle of proportionality in states of emergency is governed by the following conditions, derived from The Greek Case decision:

1. The emergency must be actual and imminent.
2. The emergency must affect the entire country.
3. The emergency must threaten the continued existence of the state and/or organized society within it.
4. The actual emergency can only be addressed through a state of emergency, and not through ordinary governance or legislation.

The principle of proportionality under the ICCPR is also governed by the Paris Minimum Standards of Human Rights Norms in a State of Emergency of 1984, which require that a state of emergency not last longer than required to “restore normal conditions” and which reinforce the principle that any derogation of rights under the state of emergency not exceed the absolute necessity created by the actual emergency.

Emergency regulations issued under Section 39 of Basic Law: The Government (2001) are subject to the conditions of the principle of proportionality as articulated by the Supreme Court and the ICCPR, and the Supreme Court has asserted its ability to invalidate such emergency regulations through the precedent set in the Poraz case, imposing a significant check on the powers of the Government during a state of emergency and asserting a separation of powers through judicial review even in emergency conditions. Section 39(d) of Basic Law: The Government reinforces this principle by preventing emergency regulations from depriving individuals of legal recourse, allowing judicial resolution where emergency regulations issued by the Government might otherwise try to prevent it.

== Judicial oversight of the state of emergency ==
While the regulations issued by the Israeli government under the state of emergency are governed by safeguards in the form of Knesset and judicial oversight, the continued existence of the state of emergency and significant government functions reliant upon its regulations are not currently contested by any institutions of the Israeli state. This has not always been the case. The Supreme Court of Israel, sitting as the High Court of Justice, issued in 2012 a Decree nisi responding to a 1999 petition by the Association for Civil Rights in Israel. This order required the government to provide regular updates on its stated intent to eventually repeal the state of emergency and unwinding important regulations from their dependence on it, codifying them into ordinary law. However, the Court ruled the same year that the Government's progress on regularizing some of these laws demonstrated sufficient progress, and it declined to intervene in the process further. Despite noting significant continued concerns about the threat a perpetual state of emergency posed to Israeli democracy, the High Court declared that the original 1999 petition had “exhausted its purpose” in that it spurred the Government to take action to draw down the state of emergency. This prompted the Court to dismiss the petition while leaving open the possibility that it could be revived if the Government's progress significantly faltered. In adopting this limit upon judicial intervention to determine a state of emergency, the High Court of Justice mirrored the state of emergency principles adopted by the European Court of Human Rights in Greek case and Ireland v. UK, where it was acknowledged that a state of emergency presents a significant violation of democratic principles while also conceding that the judiciary is not the appropriate branch of government to determine the state of emergency's existence.
