= Jamaat al Muslimeen =

Islamist group in Trinidad and Tobago

- جماعة المسلمين
- Founder: Yasin Abu Bakr
- Leader: Sadiq al Razi
- Founded: 1982
- Country: Trinidad and Tobago
- Ideology: Islamic extremism Salafism

The Jammat-al-Muslimeen (Arabic: جماعة المسلمين, romanized: al-Jamā‘at al-Muslimīn; also transliterated as Jamaat-ul Muslimeen or Jama'at al-Muslimeen: "School of Muslims", "The Muslim Assembly", "The Muslim Society", "The Muslim Community") is an Islamist fundamentalist group in Trinidad and Tobago.

The organisation was responsible for the Jamaat al Muslimeen coup attempt of July 1990, in which its leader, Imam Yasin Abu Bakr, led members of the Jamaat in an attempted coup d'état against the unpopular Government of Trinidad and Tobago. Over a six-day period, members of the government, including then-Prime Minister A.N.R. Robinson, were held hostage at gunpoint, while the group occupied a television station and parliament, and chaos and looting broke out in the streets of the capital, Port of Spain.

== Origins ==
The movement had its social origins in a widespread presence of black racism and supremacy, the division of community on the basis of race, the illicit drug trade and ideology of extremist jihad. The next step was a development of a militant Islamic discourse which insisted that liberation for especially Afro-Trinidadians and Tobagonians was only found within the ambit of Islam. As a result, a group called Jamaat al Muslimeen (JAM) was founded. With regards to the Trinidadian Muslim communities, it found support among Afro-Trinidadian Muslims, rather than the older group of Indian Muslims who have traditionally been "well-integrated moderates". The movement initially found inspiration in the Nation of Islam's vision of black consciousness, but increasingly moved towards salafism.

On the international stage, JAM received training and support from the Libyan leader Muammar Gaddafi through the latter's World Islamic Call Society.

== Coup attempt ==
In July 1990, forty-two insurgents stormed the parliament, taking Prime Minister Arthur Napoleon Raymond (ANR) Robinson and most of his staff hostage. Seventy-two insurgents stormed a local police station, and at 6:00 PM, JAM leader Yasin Abu Bakr told the public the government had been overthrown. During the four-day siege, in which 24 people were killed, JAM agreed to surrender in exchange for amnesty. Abu Bakr and 114 of his followers were granted presidential pardons, which were later retracted, but no JAM members from the coup have ever served jail time in connection with the attack.

A court ruling upheld an amnesty agreement obtained during the incarceration of parliament by the group. This led to the non-prosecution of its members for this crime despite the contention that the fact that guns and force were used to obtain said amnesty constituted duress. After the attempted coup, it aligned itself publicly first with the United National Congress (in the run-up to the 1995 General Elections) and later with the People's National Movement (PNM), the party which formed the Government of the Republic of Trinidad and Tobago until May 2010.

== Other crimes ==
Before and since those elections, however, present and past members have been connected to or prosecuted for serious violent crimes. These crimes include drug and gang related killings, rape and a spree of kidnappings for ransom of members of the local upper and middle class. The organisation's leader is currently being prosecuted for conspiracy to murder several of the group's former members who had spoken out publicly against the Jamaat al Muslimeen and its practices, and who were suspected of becoming witnesses in legal proceedings against its members.

In 2005, the group was suspected of being linked to a series of bombings in Port-of-Spain; a group member was arrested in the United States for attempting to ship 70 assault rifles from Fort Lauderdale to Trinidad.

Abu Bakr was investigated in 2007 when the reports of an attempted bombing attempt at John F. Kennedy (JFK) Airport linked JAM to one of the perpetrators, a Trinidadian national. The suspects reportedly asked Abu Bakr for assistance in carrying out this plot. Abu Bakr and JAM deny any connection to the plot.

In 2006, businesswoman Vindra Naipaul-Coolman was kidnapped, raped and murdered. Three JAM members later admitted involvement in the killing.

In 2014, the independent senator Dana Seetahal — who had been involved years earlier as a court prosecutor against JAM — was assassinated. The eleven men who were arrested for the murder in 2015 were all members of a JAM-affiliated mosque in Carapo, Tunapuna–Piarco. During the trial, a Special Branch intelligence memo featuring an unconfirmed report was leaked to social media. The report indicated that law enforcement feared violence from JAM, amid reports the group may have been moving arms in preparation for an attack on police stations. No attack materialised, however.

On 14 July 2015, an armed jailbreak took place in a prison in Port of Spain. Multiple of the escapees were JAM members. One of them, Allan Martin, was a gang member connected to the murder of Naipaul-Coolman, whereas another escapee was the brother of one of the suspects in the Dana Seetahal killing. During a shoot-out, Martin and police officer Sherman Maynard were killed. Abu Bakr was detained for questioning in relation to the incidents. The JAM leadership responded by threatening the government and posing a 24-hour ultimatum to liberate Abu Bakr; he was released before the ultimatum passed. Online conspiracy theories claimed that JAM itself organized the jailbreak, but this was never proven.

Abu Bakr collapsed and died at his home on 21 October 2021 at the age of 80. His successor as imam, Sadiq al Razi (who had participated in the 1990 coup attempt), called for conciliation between the JAM and the rest of the country in 2024; he also announced that the organization would partake in the upcoming Emancipation Day procession.
