= Cin =

Cin, CIn or CIN may refer to:

== Science and technology ==
=== Medicine ===
- Cervical intraepithelial neoplasia, the abnormal growth of cells on the surface of the cervix that could potentially lead to cervical cancer.
- Chromosome instability, a type of genomic instability
- Contrast-induced nephropathy, a form of kidney damage caused by exposure to medical imaging contrast material

=== Computing ===
- An object of the C++ Iostream header file (C-In).
- .cin, Cineon file format

=== Other sciences ===
- Convective inhibition, the amount of energy required to overcome the negatively buoyant energy the environment exerts on an air parcel
- Cosine integral, of which the standard mathematical symbol is "Cin"
- Chemical formula of Cyanogen iodide

== Organizations ==
- Werner Reichardt Centre for Integrative Neuroscience
- The ICAO-code of Constellation Airlines, a defunct Belgian airline
- Corporação Industrial do Norte, Portuguese-owned company that is the Iberian market leader for paint & coating products
- Chart Information Network, now known as the Official Charts Company
- Children in Need, an annual UK Telethon Fundraiser shown on the BBC
- The Crime & Investigation Network
- The Caribbean International Network (CIN TV)

== Places ==
- Cincinnati, Ohio
  - The Cincinnati Reds, the city's Major League Baseball team
  - The Cincinnati Bengals, the city's National Football League team
  - The Amtrak code for Cincinnati Union Terminal

== People ==
=== Cin ===
- Kadir Cin (born 1987), Turkish volleyball player
- Miray Cin (born 2001), Turkish-German women's footballer
- Tice Cin (born 1995), British writer

=== Çin ===
- Barış Çin (born 1975), Turkish carom and artistic billards player

== Other uses ==
- Critical Information Needs, information that people need to live safe and healthy lives.
- Corporate Identification Number, a company identifier in India
- Craft Identification Number, a fourteen-digit identifier used for European marine vessels
- Card Identification Number
- Chibi North railway station, China Railway telegraph code CIN

== See also ==
- Qin (disambiguation), sometimes spelled "Cin"
