= Sue Woodford-Hollick =

British businesswoman and consultant (born 1945)

Sue Woodford-Hollick OBE
- Born: 16 May 1945 (age 81)
- Other name: Sue Woodford
- Education: University of Sussex
- Occupations: Businesswoman, consultant, journalist
- Spouse: Clive Hollick, Baron Hollick
- Children: 3
- Father: Ulric Cross

Susan Mary Woodford-Hollick, Baroness Hollick, OBE (born 16 May 1945) is a British businesswoman and consultant with a wide-ranging involvement in broadcasting and the arts. A former investigative journalist, she worked for many years in television (as Sue Woodford), where her roles included producer/director of World in Action for Granada TV and founding commissioning editor of Multicultural Programmes for Channel Four. As a campaigner for human rights, world health, literacy, and the arts, she serves as trustee or patron of a range of charities and foundations. She is founder and co-director of Bringing up Baby Ltd, a childcare company. Other causes and organisations with which she is associated include the African Medical and Research Foundation, the Leader's Quest Foundation, Complicité theatre company, Reprieve, the Free Word Centre, the Runnymede Trust and the SI Leeds Literary Prize. Of English and Trinidadian heritage, she is married to Clive Hollick, Baron Hollick, with whom she has three daughters.

== Early life ==
Sue Woodford-Hollick was educated at the University of Sussex and is the daughter of Ulric Cross, a former High Court judge in Trinidad, Trinidadian High Commissioner to London (1990–93) and much-decorated RAF squadron leader in World War II (who inspired the 2018 film Hero by Frances-Anne Solomon). On BBC Woman's Hour on 8 August 2012, in the feature "Family Secrets" for which she was interviewed by her daughter Abigail, Woodford-Hollick spoke about growing up believing that she had been adopted by the white parents she knew as "Auntie May and Uncle Dick", only to discover in her twenties that her natural father was a Caribbean war hero and that her much older "sister" was in fact her mother, who had been forced to marry someone else: "Illegitimacy was not accepted in those days, and prejudice against black people was rife everywhere." Woodford-Hollick contributed the memoir "Who I Was Then and Who I Am Now" to the 2019 anthology New Daughters of Africa, edited by Margaret Busby.

== Career ==
In 1969, Woodford-Hollick joined Granada Television in Manchester as a newsreader and presenter/reporter on the regional news magazine programme, and she went on to become one of the few women to produce/direct the flagship current affairs programme World in Action.

In 1981, she joined Channel 4 Television as the first Commissioning Editor for multi-cultural programming, one of the priorities of the new channel, where she commissioned a range of programmes to reflect the diversity of Britain's minority ethnic communities. Her work at Channel 4 was described by Farrukh Dhondy as "revolutionary".

== Consultancy and voluntary work ==
She has been involved throughout her life with many campaigns for human rights and diversity. Between 1993 and 2000, she chaired Index on Censorship, the international magazine for free speech, of which she remains a patron.

In September 2000, she succeeded Trevor Phillips as Chair of the London Arts Board, and on the creation of a single funding body for the arts in England, Woodford-Hollick was appointed in 2002 to the national council of the new organisation, Arts Council England, and to chair its London regional council, which she did for seven years.

She has been an adviser on Caribbean affairs to the Foreign and Commonwealth Office, and in 1998 she served on the Commission on the Future of Multi-Ethnic Britain, an independent inquiry set up by the Runnymede Trust and chaired by Lord Parekh. She has also served on the boards of a wide range of organisations, including Talawa Theatre Company, the Theatre Museum, Tate Members, the Royal Commonwealth Society Contemporary Dance Trust, the English National Opera and the University of Westminster.

She is currently a trustee of the African Medical and Research Foundation, Africa's largest health NGO, based in Nairobi, Kenya. She chairs the Leader's Quest Foundation and has served as a trustee of Complicité theatre company and of Reprieve. She is also a patron of the Runnymede Trust and a trustee of the Free Word Centre. In addition, she is a patron of the SI Leeds Literary Prize, an award for unpublished fiction for Black and Asian women in the UK.

In April 2012, in Port of Spain, Trinidad, she announced the inauguration of the Hollick Arvon Caribbean Writers Prize, sponsored by the Hollick Family Charitable Trust and the Arvon Foundation, in association with the NGC Bocas Lit Fest, an award to allow a Caribbean writer living in the Anglophone region and writing in English, and who has not yet published a full-length book, to devote time to advancing a work in progress.

She was named as one of the supporters of the Women's Prize for Fiction 2013.

She is a trustee of the foundation announced in December 2014 in memory of cultural theorist Stuart Hall.

== Personal life ==
She is married to the businessman Clive Hollick, Baron Hollick, with whom she has three daughters.

Woodford-Hollick has two half-siblings whose father was also Ulric Cross: filmmaker Nicola Cross and Richard Finch, an educator who works in South Africa. Finch has spoken of meeting his father for the first time, when in his forties.

== Honours and awards ==
She was appointed Officer of the Order of the British Empire (OBE) in the 2011 Birthday Honours for services to the arts. She is an Honorary Fellow of the University of Westminster and a Fellow of the Royal Society of Arts.

She is regularly included on the Power List of "Britain's 100 Most Influential Black People".

In January 2018, she received an honorary doctorate from the University of Sussex.

She is an honorary fellow of Merton College, Oxford.
