= Angul Aluminum Park =

Industrial Park in Odisha

Coordinates: 20.825°N 85.180°E

Angul Aluminium Park Private Limited
- Type: Special-purpose entity
- Founded: 2014
- Area served: India
- Products: Industrial infrastructure
- Services: Industrial park development and management
- Owners: National Aluminium Company Limited; Odisha Industrial Infrastructure Development Corporation

Park details
- Location: Angul, Odisha, India
- Area: 223 acres
- Project funding: ~₹100–125 crore (earlier estimates); ₹428.95 crore (2022; mega aluminium park phase)
- Established: 2014 (approved)
- Operator: Angul Aluminium Park Pvt. Ltd.
- Industry focus: Manufacturing, ancillary, and downstream activities

Registration details
- CIN: U27203OR2010PTC012284
- ROC: ROC, Cuttack
- NIC: 2720
- NIC description: Manufacture of basic precious and non-ferrous metals
- Footnotes; Developed as a joint venture SPV for aluminium-based industries

Angul Aluminium Park (also referred to as Angul Aluminium Park Private Limited) is an industrial park located in Angul, in the state of Odisha. It is developed by National Aluminium Company Limited and the Odisha Industrial Infrastructure Development Corporation. The project was developed through a special purpose vehicle named Angul Aluminium Park Private Limited (AAPPL). The project is aimed at promoting downstream aluminium industries and strengthening value-added manufacturing in the region.

== History ==
The proposal to establish an aluminium park at Angul was approved by the Government of India in 2014 under the Modified Industrial Infrastructure Upgradation Scheme (MIIUS). The project was initially estimated to cost about ₹125 crore and was envisioned as a dedicated industrial cluster for aluminium-based industries.

Angul Aluminium Park Private Limited (AAPPL) has been formed as a special purpose vehicle for the implementation of the project with joint participation from IDCO and NALCO.

The park was to be developed in phases over some 450 acres, with the first phase comprising some 160 to 224 acres.

However, the project was delayed due to slow progress and local resistance. The central government stopped financial assistance in 2019, citing insufficient progress in development. Physical completion was reported at around 7%.

The project was revived in 2020 with a renewed focus on infrastructure development and completion timelines.

In 2022, the Odisha Government approved a budgetary support of ₹428.95 crore for development of a mega aluminium park at Angul, including the cost of land acquisition and infrastructure.

== See also ==
- National Aluminium Company
