= Lord Have Mercy! =

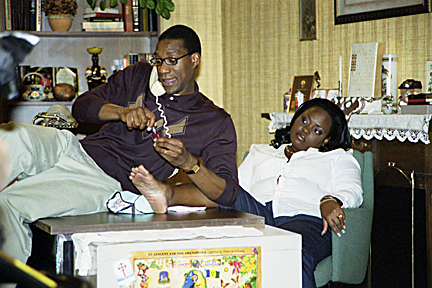
- Genre: Sitcom
- Created by: Vanz Chapman; Frances-Anne Solomon
- Directed by: Frances-Anne Solomon
- Starring: Arnold Pinnock; Dennis "Sprangalang" Hall; Rachel Price; Leonie Forbes; Shawn Singleton d'bi young Russell Peters; Gary Farmer; Louis Negin
- Country of origin: Canada
- Original language: English
- No. of seasons: 1
- No. of episodes: 13

Production
- Executive producer: Paul da Silva
- Producers: Claire Prieto, Frances-Anne Solomon, Vanz Chapman
- Production locations: Toronto, Ontario, Canada
- Editor: Judy Singh
- Running time: 30 minutes
- Production company: Leda Serene Films

Original release
- Network: Vision TV
- Release: 2003

Lord Have Mercy! is a Canadian television sitcom, produced by Leda Serene Films, first shown on Vision TV in 2003. It received further showings in Canada on Toronto One, APTN and Showcase later the same year.

The series, one of the first television productions launched by Vision TV's multicultural television development fund, starred Arnold Pinnock as Dwight Gooding, an ambitious new youth pastor at Mt. Zion, a Caribbean-Canadian church. Other main characters were Dennis "Sprangalang" Hall as head pastor Cuthbert Stevens, Rachel Price as Gooding's wife Desirée, Leonie Forbes as pastoral assistant Hope McCauley, and Shawn Singleton and d'bi young as Hope's grandchildren Kent and Crystal. The cast also included Gary Farmer, Russell Peters and Louis Negin.

Lord Have Mercy! was created by Vanz Chapman and Frances-Anne Solomon, based on an idea by Paul deSilva. It was produced by Solomon, Chapman and Claire Prieto, and directed by Solomon. Scripts were written by Solomon, Chapman and Ngozi Paul.

The series cost about $2 million to produce and was shot live to tape.

The show was nominated for two Gemini Awards, for Best Comedy Series and for Best Female Performer (Leonie Forbes) and has been screened at the African Disapora Film Festival in New York City.

The series has aired in subsequent years in the Caribbean including runs on Gayelle TV and NCC-TV in Trinidad in 2008 It has also been repeated several times on Jamaican-based Caribbean International Network (CIN-TV), a channel which is carried by cable systems in the New York metropolitan area.

== Cast and characters ==
- Arnold Pinnock as Youth Pastor Dwight Gooding, an ambitious up and coming junior pastor at Mt. Zion Church.
- Dennis "Sprangalang" Hall as Pastor Lloyd Cuthbert Stevens, Mt. Zion's head pastor and patriarch.
- Rachel Price as Desiree, Gooding's wife
- Leonie Forbes as pastoral assistant Sister Hope McCauley
- Shawn Singleton as Kent, Hope's grandson
- d'bi Young (credited on-screen as Debbie Young) as Crystal, Hope's granddaughter
- Gary Farmer as Marty C. Marten, the church's window washer and handyman, who is in love with Sister Hope
- Russell Peters as Ryan Sarma, Gooding's childhood friend.
- Louis Negin as Pastor White, a Roman Catholic priest and friend of Pastor Cuthbert's.

== Episodes ==
| No. | Title | Directed by | Written by | Original release date |
|---|---|---|---|---|
| 1 | "Honeymoon Done!" | Frances-Anne Solomon | Teleplay by Vanz Chapman & Frances-Anne Solomon, Story by Frances-Anne Solomon, Vanz Chapman & Ngozi Paul | February 11, 2003 |
As the up and coming Pastor at Mt. Zion, Gooding is determined to make a few changes, which leads Sister Hope to throw a fit and kick him out.
| 2 | "Who the Cap Fits" | Frances-Anne Solomon | Frances-Anne Solomon, Vanz Chapman & Ngozi Paul | February 12, 2003 |
Hope is upset after finding a chocolate-flavoured condom in Crystal's possession.
| 3 | "Tangled Web" | Frances-Anne Solomon | Frances-Anne Solomon, Vanz Chapman & Ngozi Paul | February 12, 2003} |
Pastor Stevens and Pastor White lie to get out of a church event so they can go to a Toronto Raptors game.
| 4 | "The Flesh Is Weak (The Mind Is Willing)" | Frances-Anne Solomon | Frances-Anne Solomon, Vanz Chapman & Ngozi Paul | February 12, 2003 |
Crystal develops a crush on Gooding, creating a moral dilemma for the pastor.
| 5 | "Deranged Marriage" | Frances-Anne Solomon | Teleplay by Vanz Chapman Story by Frances-Anne Solomon, Vanz Chapman & Ngozi Paul | February 13, 2003 |
Ryan (Russell Peters) is in love, and winds up staying at the church when he gets thrown out of the house.
| 6 | "The Choir" | Frances-Anne Solomon | Frances-Anne Solomon, Vanz Chapman & Ngozi Paul | February 13, 2003 |
Tensions develop between Crystal and Des when Crystal starts a youth choir and won't allow Des to be involved.
| 7 | "Everybody Needs Hope/The Date" | Frances-Anne Solomon | Frances-Anne Solomon, Vanz Chapman & Ngozi Paul | February 13, 2003 |
Desiree plays matchmaker for Hope and Marty
| 8 | "Backsliding" | Frances-Anne Solomon | Frances-Anne Solomon, Vanz Chapman & Ngozi Paul | February 13, 2003 |
Kent is eager to help the people of Mount Zion, but he gets discouraged and backslides into old habits.
| 9 | "The Barrel" | Frances-Anne Solomon | Frances-Anne Solomon, Vanz Chapman & Ngozi Paul | February 13, 2003 |
Gooding wants to send hurricane relief to Jamaica, but Hope refuses to support the idea.
| 10 | "The Prodigal Pastor" | Frances-Anne Solomon | Frances-Anne Solomon, Vanz Chapman & Ngozi Paul | February 14, 2003 |
Hope's estranged brother (Oliver Samuels) visits Mount Zion, and cons the congregation.
| 11 | "Immigration Blues" | Frances-Anne Solomon | Frances-Anne Solomon, Vanz Chapman & Ngozi Paul | February 14, 2003 |
Gooding discovers that Des doesn't have any immigration papers.
| 12 | "Blood is Thicker" | Frances-Anne Solomon | Teleplay by Vanz Chapman, Story by Frances-Anne Solomon, Vanz Chapman & Ngozi Paul | February 14, 2003 |
Stevens is asked to resign when Crystal seeks his help in getting an abortion, and Hope leaves Mount Zion.
| 13 | "Greener Pastures (Retirement)" | Frances-Anne Solomon | Frances-Anne Solomon, Vanz Chapman & Ngozi Paul | February 14, 2003 |
Hope leaves and Stevens, feeling out of sorts as a result, declares his plan to retire, but Gooding and Des try to get him to stay while also attempting to get Sister Hope to return.
