= Hero (2019 Trinidad and Tobago film) =

2019 film by Frances-Anne Solomon

- Directed by: Frances-Anne Solomon
- Screenplay by: Frances-Anne Solomon, Nickolai Salcedo, Akley Olton
- Produced by: Frances-Anne Solomon, Lisa Wickham, Anne Marie Stewart
- Distributed by: CaribbeanTales Worldwide Distribution, Capital Motion Pictures
- Release date: 19 May 2019
- Running time: 111 minutes
- Countries: Trinidad and Tobago; Canada
- Language: English

Hero, also released as Hero: Inspired by the Extraordinary Life of Mr. Ulric Cross, is a Trinidad and Tobago dramatic film inspired by the life of the Trinidadian RAF officer, lawyer and diplomat Ulric Cross (1917–2013). It was produced and directed by Frances-Anne Solomon and won an award in the 2019 Africa Movie Academy Award for Best Diaspora Narrative Feature Film category.

== Synopsis ==
In 1941, Ulric Cross, a young man from Trinidad, leaves his island home to seek his fortune. He emerges from World War II as the RAF's most decorated West Indian. His life takes a dramatically different course when he follows the call of history, and joins the independence movements sweeping Africa in the 1950s and '60s.

Reviewed in The Guardian, the film was described as "stimulating and provocative – filmed history that means to prompt debate, rather than light matinee snoozing."

== Cast ==
- Nickolai Salcedo as Ulric Cross
- Pippa Nixon as Ann Cross
- Peter Williams as Anthony "Pony" MacFarlane
- Eric Kofi Abrefa as Kofi Mensah
- Jessica B. Hill as Nicola Cross
- Joseph Marcell as C. L. R. James
- Fraser James as George Padmore
- Jimmy Akingbola as Kwame Nkrumah
- John Dumelo as P. K. Asante
- Valerie Buhagiar as Daphne Park
- Prince David Osei as Mobutu Sese Seko
- O. C. Ukeje as Julius Nyerere
- Tessa Alexander as Ulric's Mother
- Adjetey Anang as Patrice Lumumba
- Ekow Smith Asante as Edouardo Mondlane
- Sam Asante as Journalist
- Jonathan Blaize as Young Ulric
- Ayinde Blake as RAF Pilot
