= Ulric Cross =

Trinidadian lawyer and diplomat (1917–2013)

Ulric Cross DSO DFC
- Cross as shown in a 1944 documentary about the West Indies
- Born: Philip Louis Ulric Cross; 1 May 1917; Belmont, Port of Spain, Trinidad and Tobago
- Died: 4 October 2013 (aged 96); Port of Spain, Trinidad and Tobago
- Children: Sue Woodford-Hollick (daughter); Richard Finch (son); Nicola Cross (daughter)
- Military career
- Allegiance: United Kingdom
- Branch: Royal Air Force
- Service years: 1941–47
- Rank: Squadron Leader
- Nickname: Black Hornet
- Service number: 133060
- Commands: No. 139 (Jamaica) Squadron
- Conflicts: World War II
- Awards: Distinguished Service Order; Distinguished Flying Cross

Philip Louis Ulric Cross DSO DFC (1 May 1917 – 4 October 2013) was a Trinidadian jurist, diplomat and Royal Air Force (RAF) navigator, recognised as possibly the most decorated West Indian of World War II. He is credited with helping to prevent some two hundred bombers from being shot down in a raid over Germany in 1943. He subsequently studied law at London's Middle Temple, and went on to fulfil a distinguished international career as a jurist across Africa and within Trinidad and Tobago. He also served as a diplomat for Trinidad and Tobago to the United Kingdom.

== Early life and education ==
Ulric Cross was born on 1 May 1917, in Belmont, Port of Spain, Trinidad, to Reginald Rufus and Maud Iris Cross. He was the second child in a family of nine. At the age of 11, he came first in Trinidad's Government Exhibition Scholarship Examination, thus qualifying for five years of free secondary education, and went on to attend St Mary's College. He was devastated by his mother's death when he was just 13 years old. His academic focus was completely derailed, and so, after completing five years of college education, he left school. His first job was with the Trinidad Guardian as a copy editor. Then he worked for about four years as a clerk to Leo Pujadas, Solicitor. When Cross turned 21, he joined the Civil Service and worked for a while with the Trinidad Government Railway. In this job, his close colleague was J. O'Neil "Scottie" Lewis.

== World War II service ==
In 1941, aged 24, Cross left Trinidad to join Britain's Royal Air Force (RAF) – being "young, adventurous and idealistic". He served with RAF Bomber Command during World War II, attaining the rank of Squadron Leader. In June 1944 he was awarded the Distinguished Flying Cross and in January 1945, he was awarded the Distinguished Service Order in recognition of his "fine example of keenness and devotion to duty" and "exceptional navigational ability".

Cross was a member of the elite Pathfinder Force that perfected techniques for precision main force bombing. In his own words: "We did a lot of low-level daylight bombing. We flew at just 50 feet instead of the normal 25,000 feet. We dropped four 500-pound bombs. You flew in to your target at 50 feet and as you approached it you went up to 1,200 feet. You then did a shallow dive onto the target and released your bombs. The bomb had an 11-second delay, so you shot up to avoid the bomb blast. We went over in formation and we bombed in formation, but we came back independently." Cross flew 80 missions over Germany and occupied Europe as navigator of a Mosquito fighter-bomber, and was the model for the black character, Squadron Leader Charles Ford, in Ken Follett's novel Hornet Flight.

== Legal career ==
After the war, Cross studied law and he was called to the Bar under the aegis of the Middle Temple, London, on 26 January 1949.

He then returned to Trinidad where, from 1949 to 1953, he was Legal Adviser to the Comptroller of Imports and Exports, Trinidad and Tobago. He also lectured in Trade Union History and Trade Union Law at the Extra-Mural Department of the University of the West Indies, located in Trinidad. He subsequently returned to London, and worked for some time as a producer for Talks and the famed Caribbean Voices at the BBC (1953–1957).

Then his career took an entirely different turn, and he went to practise law in Ghana, Cameroon and Tanzania for many years. Between 1958 and 1960, he worked closely with Kwame Nkrumah in Ghana, where Cross was Crown Counsel and Senior Crown Counsel, and lectured in Criminal Law at the Ghana School of Law. Continuing his African journey, he served in West Cameroon (1960–1966), where he was elevated to Senior Crown Counsel and Attorney General, was a Member of the Cabinet, the House of Chiefs and the House of Assembly Avocat-General at the Federal Court of Justice of the Republic of Cameroon. In 1967, Cross became a High Court judge in Tanzania, where from 1968 to 1970 he was Chairman of the Permanent Labour Tribunal. He also served as a professor of law at the University of Dar es Salaam.

Once again, Cross returned to Trinidad, this time in 1971 to serve as a High Court judge. In 1979, he was elevated to the Court of Appeal. He then became Chairman of the Law Reform Commission of Trinidad and Tobago, from 1982 to 1983, and in this position he made a significant contribution towards furthering the revision and development of the country's laws. On his death, Kamla Persad-Bissessar, then Prime Minister of Trinidad and Tobago, acknowledged his years spent on the judiciary of Trinidad and Tobago, saying: "Some of his judgments changed the landscape of Trinidad and Tobago."

== Diplomatic postings ==
In the United Kingdom, from 1990 to 1993, Cross served as High Commissioner for Trinidad and Tobago at the Court of St James's, UK, combining the position with that of Ambassador to both Germany and France. Previously, he had been appointed chairman of the Commonwealth Foundation in 1983.

== Community service ==
During his final return to Trinidad and Tobago, Cross in April 1993 co-founded – with his colleague, Desmond Allum SC – the charitable non-profit organization called the Cotton Tree Foundation (CTF), that still today works with some of the most deprived communities in Port of Spain in order to combat high levels of poverty and unemployment through counselling, self-help, education and training projects. On his 90th birthday in 2007, the Ulric Cross Cotton Tree Endowment Fund was launched, expanding the work of the Cotton Tree Foundation to include a legal aid clinic, a community sports programme and an art and music programme.

During these years also, as Squadron Leader Cross, he served as president of the Royal Air Forces Association Trinidad and Tobago Branch No. 1075 (established on 17 April 1953) from 2009 until his death in 2013. As President he was very active in running the Branch and inspired the vision to build a Military Veterans Complex for all veterans of military service on the Branch's property at 20 Queen's Park East, Belmont, Port of Spain, Trinidad and Tobago.

=== Awards and honours ===
Cross was the recipient of many awards and accolades. In 2011, at Trinidad and Tobago's 49th Independence Day celebrations, he received the Order of the Republic of Trinidad and Tobago, the nation's highest award, for distinguished and outstanding service in the sphere of law. In June 2011, the Piarco Air Station was renamed the Ulric Cross Air Station. In July 2011 the President of Trinidad and Tobago. George Maxwell Richards, presented Cross with the Heroes Foundation first heroes medallion, and in 2012 a comic book entitled And Justice For All, The True Story Of A Local Hero was published in his honour by the Heroes Foundation, in their "Heroes of a Nation" series.

Cross's remarkable life and career achievements are chronicled in a feature film that has won several international awards. Directed by Frances-Anne Solomon and entitled Hero: Inspired by the Extraordinary Life and Times of Mr. Ulric Cross, it was first released in 2019.

== Personal life and death ==
Cross had two daughters — Nicola Cross, a filmmaker, and Susan Woodford-Hollick, an arts administrator — and a son, Richard Finch, an educator who works in South Africa. Finch has spoken of meeting his father for the first time, when in his forties.

Ulric Cross died, aged 96, on 4 October 2013 at his home on Dere Street, Port of Spain, where, in his retirement, he lived with his daughter Nicola. A memorial service in his honour was held at Memorial Park, Port of Spain, on 10 October 2013. Paying tribute to Cross at the service, the British High Commissioner said: "Without the help of servicemen from the Commonwealth (like Cross), the outcome of World War II would have been entirely different."

On 8 February 2014, a tribute to Cross was held in London by the Trinidad and Tobago High Commission at St Peter's Church, Eaton Square, where the High Commissioner, His Excellency Garvin Nicholas spoke, saying: "Justice Ulric Cross was a man who not only served Trinidad and Tobago tirelessly, but dedicated his existence to the preservation of justice and democracy on an international scale ... His was a distinguished life, a life very well lived. Now more than ever, our society dearly needs role models like Justice Ulric Cross."

== Selected awards ==
- Distinguished Flying Cross (DFC), 1944
- Distinguished Service Order (DSO), 1945
- Order of Merit – First Class, Federal Republic of Cameroon
- Order of Valour, Federal Republic of Cameroon
- Chaconia Gold Medal, Trinidad & Tobago, 1983
- Honorary Doctorate of Law, University of the West Indies, 1993
- Order of the Republic of Trinidad and Tobago, 2011

== Papers published ==
- "First Instance Civil Procedure in Anglophonic Africa" (conference at University of Nairobi sponsored by the Max Planck Institute, Hamburg)
- "The Administration of Legal Systems in Developing Countries" (Law and Development Seminar at the University of Papua New Guinea)
