= Kathleen McClellan =

American actress

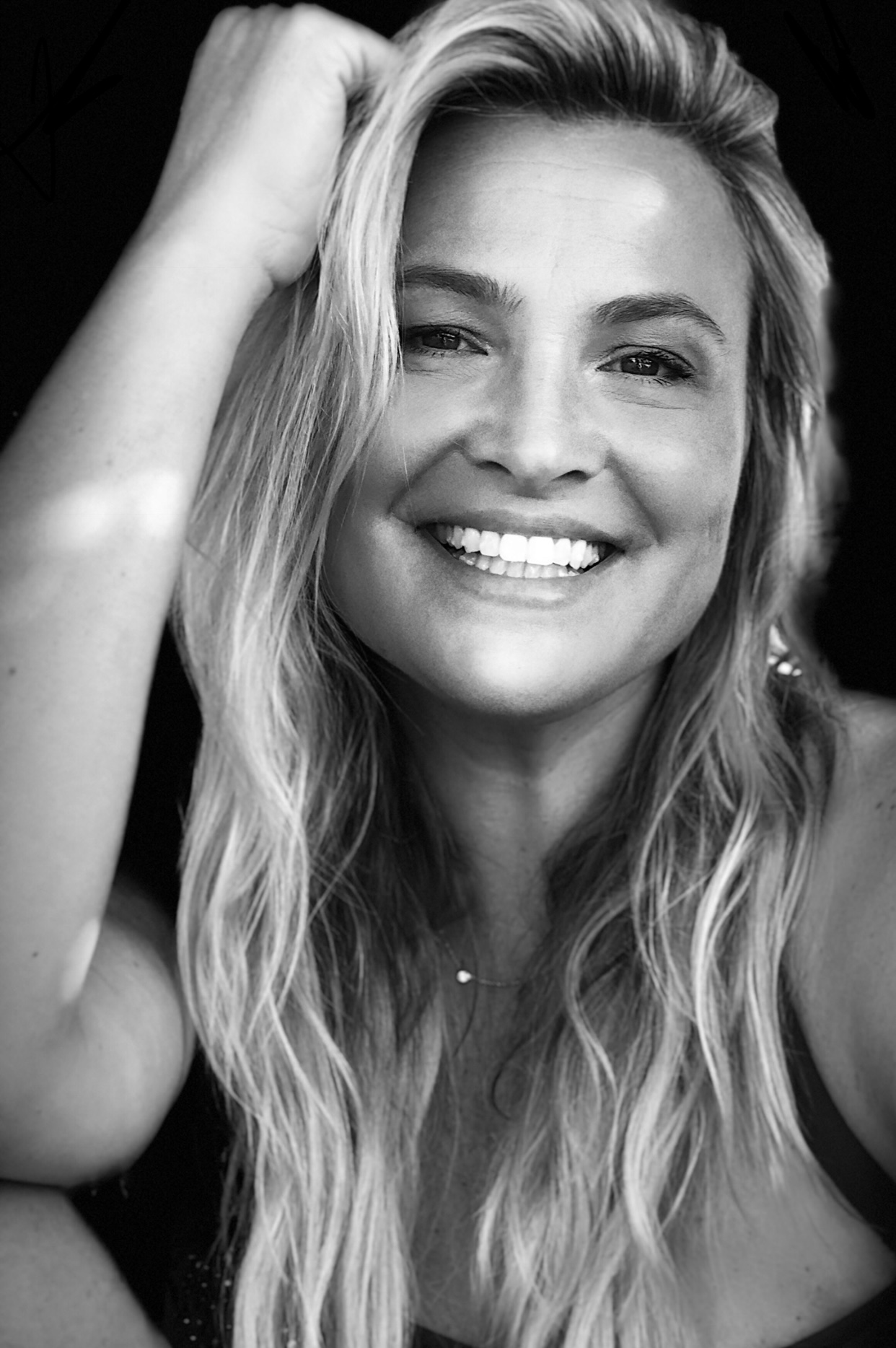
- Born: Kathleen McClellan; April 28, 1970 (age 56); Bloomington, Illinois, US
- Occupations: Actress; model; television host
- Years active: 1990–present
- Known for: The Bold and the Beautiful; Rattlesnakes
- Title: Miss Illinois Teen USA 1988

Kathleen McClellan is an American actress, model, television host, and former Miss Illinois Teen USA.

She is perhaps first recognized for her role on Seinfeld as Melissa, Jerry's naked girlfriend, most recently noted for her starring role in the award-winning film, Rattlesnakes, and for her 2002–2004 role as the host of TLC's For Better or For Worse.

== Early life ==
McClellan grew up in Bloomington, Illinois. In 1988, she was crowned Miss Illinois Teen USA, was named Most Photogenic in the National Miss Teen USA Pageant, and was signed to Elite Model Management, which began her modeling career in Paris.

=== Miss Teen USA ===
The 1988 Miss Teen USA Pageant was hosted by Dick Clark in San Bernardino, California, where McClellan earned the top score in interview, and held the second highest scores in swimsuit, evening gown and overall average score, second only to Jessica Collins.

== Career ==
McClellan is known for her work as a dramatic and comedic actor, fashion model, commercial actress, television personality, spokesperson, and television host. Notable modeling campaigns include Skyy vodka, L'Oréal Paris, Cherokee Jeans, Maui Jim Sunglasses, and Hanes. McClellan has starred in countless commercial campaigns including Coors, Budweiser, Chrysler, Visa, and Toyota.

She has been featured in Muscle and Fitness Magazine, InStyle, Mademoiselle, People, TV Guide, Maxim, and Stuff. She was the international spokesperson for and face of Sense Skincare.

She has guest starred on many comedic television shows such as Seinfeld, Murphy Brown, Suddenly Susan, Herman's Head, and The Fresh Prince of Bel-Air. Recurring roles include Ladies Man and The Bold and the Beautiful. In 1996, McClellean guest starred as an android on an episode of Sliders alongside Eddie Mills and Robert Englund during its third season.

McClellan was the host of TLC's For Better or For Worse (2003-2005). She was the sideline correspondent for Battle Dome (1999-2001) and host of Surprise Weddings (FOX), and Warner Brothers' Live from the Red Carpet. She has appeared as herself as a guest host on shows such as Wild On E!, MTV Spring Break, and as herself as a TV personality on Run Away With the Rich and Famous, Search Party and The X Show. She and her home were featured on E! Celebrity Homes.

Her film work includes a role in the film The Set Effect. She is also featured in Charlie Robison's country music video "El Cerrito Place".

In 2019, McClellan made her comeback in the award-winning film Rattlesnakes. McClellan executive produced and starred in it alongside actors Jimmy Jean-Louis and Jack Coleman. McClellan took the film from initial concept to creation with Jimmy Jean-Louis (producer), and collaborated with Julius Amedume (writer/director) to adapt the original stage play set in London in the 1990s, to a modern-day film set in Southern California. Much of the film was shot in McClellan's own Montecito home. Rattlesnakes enjoyed a limited theatrical release starting in April 2019 and played at over 20 international film festivals, winning eight awards.

=== Awards ===
- Audience award for best feature at the 27th Pan African Film Festival in Los Angeles, California
- Innovative film award at the Haiti International Film Festival
- ScreenNation Independent Sprit Film Production Award at the 14th Screen Nation Film and Television Awards in London
- Best Film award at the 14th Caribbean Tales International Film Festival (CTFF), Toronto, Canada
- Best Screenplay at the Urban Film Festival in Miami, Florida
- Michael Anyiam Osigwe - 2019 African Movie Academy Award For Best Film by an African Director Living Abroad (Diasporia) (African Oscar)
- Winner of the audience choice award at the 9th African International Film Festival 2019, Nigeria
- Winner of the Best Film at the 9th African International Film Festival 2019, Nigeria

== Credits ==
Year	Title	Role	Notes
1990	Grand	Misty	The Return of Yale Pinhaus
1991	Seinfeld	Young Sherry Becker	Episode: "The Library"
1992	The Fresh Prince of Bel-Air	Nurse Bonnie	Episode: "Ill Will"
1992	Married... with Children	Girl	Episode: "Frat Chance"
1992	In Living Color	Guest star	
1993	Herman's Head	Ellen Crawford	Episode: "When Hermy Met Crawford's Daughter"
1993	Basic Values: Sex, Shock & Censorship in the 90's		
1994	Murphy Brown	Inge Sorenson	Episode: "Fjord Eyes Only"
1994	Attack of the 5 Ft. 2 Women	Connie	TV movie
1994	The Bold and the Beautiful	Coco	12 episodes
1995	Blossom	Sorel	Episode: "You Say Tomato"
1995	New York Daze	Laura	Episode: "Pretend You Know Me"
1995	Misery Loves Company	Hildy	Episode: "The Witches of East 6t"
1996	Local Heroes	Melissa	Episode: "Mester Meister"
1996	NewsRadio	Valeri	Episode: "Presence"
1996	Pacific Blue	Leslie	Episode: "All Jammed Up"
1996	The Associate	Frank's Girlfriend	
1996	The Sentinel	Francine Berry	Episode: "Spare Parts"
1996	Sliders	E.R.I.C.A. / Shauna Aldohn	Episode: "State of the A.R.T."
1996	Mulholland Falls		
1997	Seinfeld	Melissa	Episode: "The Apology"
1998	Arli$$	Susie	Episode: "Behind Every Great Client..."
1999	Suddenly Susan	Mia	Episode: "One Man's Intervention Is Another Man's Tupperware Party"
1999	The Set Effect	Amanda	
1999-2001	Battle Dome	Sideline correspondent	26 episodes
2000	Two Guys, a Girl and a Pizza Place	Tina, the body double	Episode: "The Monitor Story"
2000	Surprise Wedding	host	
2001	Ladies Man	Terry	3 episodes
2001	Zigs	Jennifer	
2001-2002	The Bold and the Beautiful	Heidi	4 episodes
2003-2005	For Better or for Worse	Host	49 episodes
2003	Fastlane	Bunny	Episode: "Strap On"
2003	Haunted Mansion	Ghost	
2004	L.A. Twister	Bambi	
2019	Rattlesnakes	Lizzy Hansen	Starring / executive producer
