= Rattlesnakes (film) =

Rattlesnakes is a 2019 film directed by Julius Amedume and produced by Nik Powell of Scala Productions. It is based on the stage play Rattlesnakes written by Graham Farrow.

Starring Jack Coleman, Jimmy Jean-Louis, and Kathleen McClellan, the story revolves around Robert McQueen, whose day takes a turn for the worse when he is held hostage and accused by three vengeful husbands of sleeping with their wives. However, the truths they hear will change their lives forever.

== Awards ==
- Audience award for best feature at the 27th Pan African Film Festival in Los Angeles, California.
- Innovative film award at the Haiti International Film Festival.
- ScreenNation Independent Sprit Film Production Award at the 14th Screen Nation Film and Television Awards in London.
- Best Film award at the 14th Caribbean Tales International Film Festival (CTFF), Toronto, Canada.
- Best Screenplay at the Urban Film Festival in Miami, Florida.
- The Michael Anyiam Osigwe – 2019 African Movie Academy Award For Best Film by an African Director Living Abroad (Diasporia) (African Oscar)
- Winner of the audience choice award at the 9th African International Film Festival 2019. Nigeria
- Winner of the Best Film at the 9th African International Film Festival 2019 Nigeria.
