= Ship identifier =

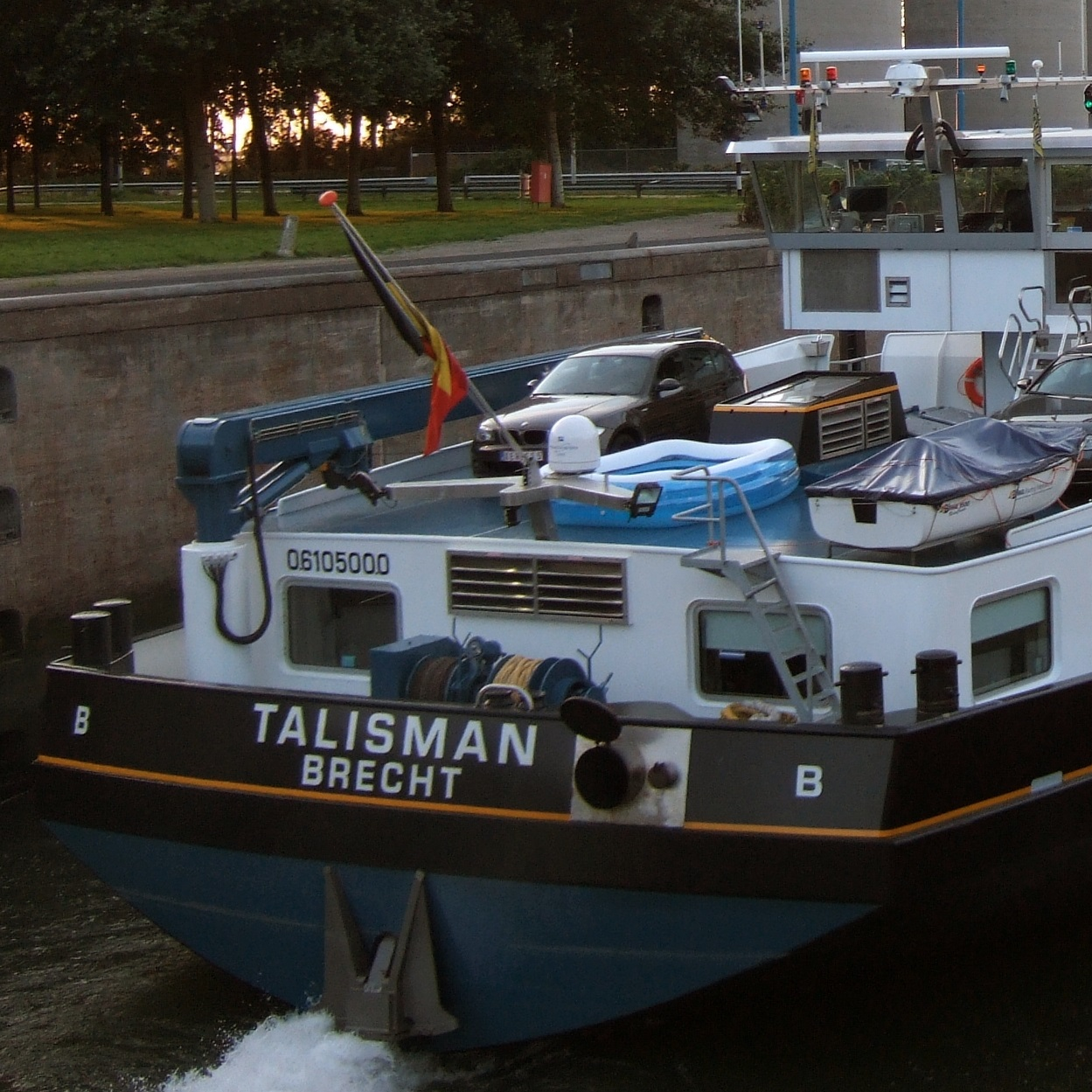
Stern of the Belgian vessel Talisman displaying its ENI number: 06105000

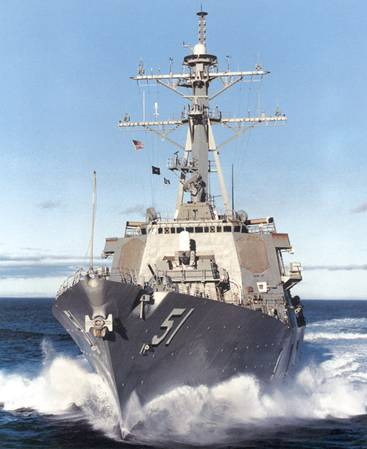
USS Arleigh Burke displays hull number 51

A ship identifier refers to one of several types of identifiers used for maritime vessels. An identifier may be a proper noun (La Niña); a proper noun combined with a standardized prefix based on the type of ship (e.g. RMS Titanic); a serial code; a unique, alphanumeric ID (e.g. A123B456C7); or an alphanumeric ID displayed in international signal flags (e.g., representing U6CH). Some identifiers are permanent for a ship while others may be changed at the owners' discretion although regulatory agencies will need to approve the change. Modern ships usually have several identifiers.

In addition to proper nouns, types of ship identifiers include:

- Code letters – an identifier for a ship that is displayed on vessels by ICS flags representing the letters of the alphabet and numbers 0–9, e.g. the flags (from top to bottom) represented the identifier "USMW"
- Hull number or Hull Identification Number (HIN) – a number used as an identifier for civilian and naval vessels, national/regional subtypes include:
  - Craft Identification Number – a permanent unique fourteen-digit alphanumeric identifier issued to all marine vessels in Europe
  - ENI number (European Number of Identification or European Vessel Identification Number) – a unique, eight-digit identifier for ships capable of navigating on inland European waters that is attached to a hull for its entire lifetime, independent of the vessel's current name or flag
  - Naval Registry Identification Number – United States until 1920s, replaced by hull classification symbol system
- IMO number – a unique identifier issued by the International Maritime Organization (IMO) for ships
- Maritime call sign – an identifier used during radio transmissions, used mainly during verbal transmissions and sometimes incorporating a vessel's MMSI
- Maritime Mobile Service Identity (MMSI) – a unique, nine-digit identifier used over radio frequencies to identify a vessel, used mainly for automated, non-verbal transmissions
- Official number – a ship identifier number assigned to merchant ships by their country of registration, this system has been superseded by the IMO number system
- Ship name – a proper noun chosen at the shipowner's discretion; may change several times during the vessel's lifetime
  - Ship class – a common name for a group of ships with similar design, usually named for the first vessel of the class, e.g. "Nimitz-class aircraft carrier"
- Ship prefix – a combination of letters, usually abbreviations, used in front of the name or hull number of a civilian or naval ship, e.g. "HMS", "MV", "RV", "SS", or "USS"; naval prefix systems include:
  - Hull classification symbol (List of U.S. hull classifications) – United States since 1920s, replaced the Naval Registry Identification Number system
  - Hull classification symbol (Canada)
  - Pennant number – United Kingdom and Commonwealth countries
  - Tactical number – a number painted on the hull of a military ship, for identification either during combat or peacetime.
- Sail number – unique identifiers used especially for racing yachts but also windsurfers, and displayed on the sail to assist with search and rescue operations. The sail code prefixes are mandated by World Sailing. In some countries, out of sequence numbers akin to vanity plates can be purchased, although the registered number remains with the vessel on sale.
