= Sprangalang =

Trinidadian comedian (1949–2020)

Dennis "Sprangalang" Hall
- Born: Dennis Hall; 30 September 1949
- Died: 2 October 2020 (aged 71); Mt. Hope, Trinidad and Tobago
- Spouse: Natasha Nurse

Comedy career
- Years active: 1976–2020
- Medium: Stand-up
- Genres: Observational comedy, Trinidadian humour, satire, self-deprecation
- Subjects: Trinidad and Tobago culture, current events, everyday life

Dennis "Sprangalang" Hall (30 September 1949 – 2 October 2020) was a Trinidadian comedian, historian, actor, producer and singer/composer. His work has a mostly Trinidadian character and lies in its extremely local nature. Hall starred in the 2003 situation comedy Lord Have Mercy! which was produced in Canada for VisionTV but has also aired on Caribbean International Network and other television stations in the Caribbean in the years since it was produced. He was also featured in the 2007 Canadian feature film A Winter Tale, written, directed and produced by Frances-Anne Solomon, as well as the stage play A Man in the Bedroom, alongside fellow Trinidadian comedian Errol Fabien in 2010.

== Career ==
Sprangalang had originally wanted to be a school teacher due to his concerns over what children were being taught in schools in Trinidad and Tobago. He first appeared on the Trinidad and Tobago National Television Show Gayelle, as the character "Draxi" on a segment called "Cultural Sprangalang".

He was a lifetime member of the Trinbago Unified Calypsonians' Organisation (TUCO).

Hall suffered a seizure in June 2019, and died on 2 October 2020 at the Eric Williams Medical Sciences Complex in Mt Hope. His brother, the playwright Anthony "Tony" Hall, had died a few months earlier.
