= LeRoy Clarke =

Trinidadian and Tobagonian visual artist (1938–2021)

- Born: 7 November 1938; Belmont, Port of Spain, Trinidad and Tobago
- Died: 27 July 2021 (aged 82); Trinidad and Tobago
- Occupations: Visual artist, poet, lecturer/inspirationalist, philosopher, Orisha Leader
- Website: leroyclarke.com

LeRoy Clarke (7 November 1938 – 27 July 2021) was a visual artist, poet, lecturer/inspirationalist, philosopher and Orisha Leader, who was born in Belmont, Port of Spain, Trinidad and Tobago.

A self-taught artist, he went in 1967 to live in New York, where the following year he exhibited a series of paintings called "Fragments of a Spiritual" at the Studio Museum in Harlem, going on to become the first artist-in-residence there, between 1972 and 1974. His artwork was shown in several exhibitions over the years, including Douens (1973–76), Honouring LeRoy Clarke on His 80th Birthday and in Memory of his Mother Ellen Clarke (2018), and most recently The Eye Hayti… Cries…Everywhere, in April 2021.

As a poet, he published five books: Taste of Endless Fruit (1972); Douens (1976), Eyeing De Word – Love Poem for Ettylene (2004), De Distance Is Here, The El Tucuche Epic 1984–2007 (2007), and Secret Insect of a Bird Deep in Me, Wanting to Fly (2008).

Among the many awards he received was an honorary doctorate from the University of Trinidad and Tobago.

Clarke died on 27 July 2021, aged 82.

== Publications ==
- 1970: Portfolio: Fragments of a Spiritual (drawings)
- 1972: Taste of Endless Fruit (poems)
- 1976: Douens (poems). Second edition 1981
- 2003: LeRoy Clarke: Of Flesh and Salt and Wind and Current. Port of Spain, Trinidad and Tobago: National Museum and Art Gallery of Trinidad and Tobago, ISBN 978-9769510609
- 2004: Eyeing de Word – Love Poem for Ettylene. ISBN 976-8054-58-1 (softcover); ISBN 976-8054-58-1 (hardcover)
- 2007: De Distance Is Here – The El Tucuche Epic 1984–2007. ISBN 978-976-8054-70-8 (hardcover); ISBN 978-976-8054-71-5 (softcover)
- 2008: Secret Insect of a Bird Deep in Me, Wanting to Fly: A Collection of Drawings. ISBN 978-976-8054-74-6 (hardcover); ISBN 978-976-8054-75-3 (softcover)
- 2010: Voice of a Smouldering Coal. ISBN 978-976-8054-85-2 (hardcover); ISBN 978-976-8054-86-9 (softcover)
