= Official number =

Ship identifier number assigned to merchant ships

Official numbers are ship identifier numbers assigned to merchant ships by their country of registration. Each country developed its own official numbering system, some on a national and some on a port-by-port basis, and the formats have sometimes changed over time. As an internationally recognized ship identifier, national official numbers have largely been superseded by the IMO number, though flag states still use national systems, which also cover those vessels not subject to the IMO regulations.

== British official number ==
Beginning in 1855, with the implementation of the Merchant Shipping Act 1854, all British seagoing vessels were assigned an official number to give each ship a unique identity, even after being renamed or changing the port of registry.

== U.S. official number ==
After the passage of legislation in the United States Congress in 1866, all American ships were required to carve the official number on the main beam; the system was controlled by the Bureau of Statistics.

== See also ==
- IMO number
- Hull number
