= A Winter Tale =

- Film poster
- Directed by: Frances-Anne Solomon
- Written by: Frances-Anne Solomon; Michele Lonsdale-Smith
- Produced by: Frances-Anne Solomon; Susan Fueg; Michele Lonsdale Smith
- Starring: Peter Williams; Leonie Forbes; Michael Miller; Valerie Buhagiar; Lucky Ejim; Ryan Glasgow; Peter Bailey; Nicole Stamp; Ryan Ishmael; Bobby Del Rio
- Cinematography: Kim Derko
- Edited by: Michele Francis
- Music by: John Welsman; Mauri Hall
- Distributed by: CaribbeanTales Worldwide Distribution
- Release dates: April 11, 2007 (Reel World Film Festival); February 13, 2008 (Canada)
- Running time: 100 minutes
- Country: Canada
- Language: English

A Winter Tale is a 2007 Canadian drama film written, directed and produced by Frances-Anne Solomon, featuring Canadian actor Peter Williams and Caribbean stars Leonie Forbes and Dennis "Sprangalang" Hall. It premiered at the ReelWorld Film Festival where it won Solomon the Outstanding Canadian Feature Film Award, as well as Special Mention in the Outstanding Screenplay category. It subsequently screened at the Montreal World Film Festival, Atlantic Film Festival, Bite The Mango Film Festival (Closing Night), Trinidad and Tobago Film Festival (Opening Night, Best Feature Award) & The New York African Diaspora Film Festival (U.S. Premiere - Opening Night).

== Synopsis ==
A Winter Tale tells the story of a Black men's support group that begins to meet at a Caribbean takeaway restaurant in the aftermath of the shooting death of a local child. It was developed through a collaborative improvisational process with the cast, who were drawn from Toronto's Caribbean and multicultural communities. It was shot on location in Parkdale, Toronto.

== Cast ==
- Peter Williams as Gene
- Leonie Forbes as Miss G.
- Michael Miller as DX
- Dennis "Sprangalang" Hall as Professa
- p! Barrington as Clip
- R. O. Glasgow as Lloyd
- Sabio Emerencia Collins as Andrew
- Lucky Ejim as Sam
- Peter N. Bailey as Ian
- Ryan Ishmael as Sibeka
- Mike G. Yohannes as Mickey
- Valerie Buhagiar as Elaine
- Finlandia Casellas as Rain
- Nicole Stamp as Julie
- Shakura S'Aida as Charmaine
- Bobby Del Rio as Guy

== Production ==
The script was developed between 2003 and 2006 by Michele Lonsdale Smith and Frances-Anne Solomon, working collaboratively with the actors. Production began in Feb 2006, on location in Parkdale Toronto and some pickups were shot a year later in January 2007. Editing and post-production were completed in April 2007.

== Critical reception ==
"A Winter Tale" launched the "ReelWorld Film Festival 2007", and won the Tonya Lee Williams Award for Outstanding Canadian Feature, as well as Special Mention in the Outstanding Screenplay category.

It also won the following awards at diverse festivals: 2007 Audience Award for Best Feature Film at the Trinidad & Tobago Film Festival, 2008 Award for Best Foreign Film at the San Diego Black Film Festival, 2008 Remi Award - Best Editing Worldfest Houston Int Film Festival, 2008 Zuma Film Festival, Nigeria: Award for Best Editor, Award for Best Cinematographer & Ousmane Sembene Award for Best Foreign Film, and the 2008 Festival of Black International Cinema Berlin - Best Film.

It screened at the following festivals among others: Montreal World Film Festival (Pick of The Fest, Montreal Gazette), Atlantic Film Festival, Trinidad & Tobago Film festival (Opening Gala), Bite The Mango Film Festival (Closing Night Gala), Abuja Film Festival, 15th New York African Diaspora Film Festival (Opening Night Gala), Best of The New York African Diaspora Film Festival, Los Angeles Pan African Film Festival, Atlanta Women of Color Arts and Film Festival (Opening Night), Kasserian Ingera (Opening Night).

Lead actor Leonie Forbes was honored at the ReelWorld Film Festival with an Award of Excellence, and both Forbes & actor Peter Williams were honored by the Jamaican Consulate, New York and City of New York for their roles in the film.

A Winter Tale opened theatrically in Toronto on Feb 13 at the Revue Cinema, and then at Rainbow Cinema Woodbine. It opened in Jamaica on April 9 on general release to very positive critical reception, followed by Trinidad (May 13) and Antigua (May 22).
