= Miss Illinois Teen USA =

Beauty pageant competition

- Formation: 1983
- Type: Beauty pageant
- Headquarters: Shawnee
- Location: Kansas
- Members: Miss Teen USA
- Official language: English
- Key people: John M. Vannatta; Jason Vannatta; Jennifer Vannatta-Fisher, State Pageant Director
- Website: Official website

The Miss Illinois Teen USA competition is the pageant that selects the representative for the state of Illinois in the Miss Teen USA pageant. It is directed by Vanbros and Associates and is previously directed by D&D Productions from 2001 to 2014 before becoming part of Vanbros organization in 2014, headquartered in Lenexa, Kansas.

Illinois is in the top fifteen states in terms of number and value of placements over the twenty-three years of the Miss Teen USA competition. Illinois ties with Florida and North Carolina for the most Miss Photogenic awards won at Miss Teen USA (3) and has won more awards than any other state. Like the Miss USA Pageant, Illinois went on to win the Miss Teen USA title in the second edition of the pageant.

Ten Illinois teens have competed at Miss USA, six as Miss Illinois USA title. The first was Cherise Haugen, Illinois' only Miss Teen USA, who competed as Miss Teen USA at the 1984 pageant (the first few Miss Teen USAs were given this opportunity). Later three more would compete at the Miss USA pageant, two representing Vanbros states: Terri Bollinger represented Missouri in 1999 and Anne-Marie Dixon Oklahoma in 1998 and Lacey Wilson Massachusetts in 2010. Vanbros is a pageant production company that owns the Miss Teen USA franchises for, and produces and directs, several state pageants in the Midwest. The Miss Illinois Teen USA Pageant has been the single largest official state preliminary competition with over 150 contestants every year since at least 2002 and has always ranked among the top ten largest state preliminary pageants.

Scarlet Mcllrath of Bureau was crowned Miss Illinois Teen USA 2026 on May 24, 2026, at Braden Auditorium in Normal. She will represent Illinois at Miss Teen USA 2026.

== Results summary ==
=== Placements ===
- Miss Teen USA: Cherise Haugen (1984)
- First runners-up: Autumn Waterbury (1997), Lexi Atkins (2010)
- Third runners-up: Kathleen McClellan (1988), Kelly Cruse (2005), Sydni Dion Bennett (2018)
- Top 6: Anne-Marie Dixon (1995)
- Top 10: Lisa Jessen (1985), Nicole Manske (1998)
- Top 12: Julee Kleffman (1992)
- Top 15: Victoria Davis (2007), Olivia Pura (2016), A’Maiya Allen (2019)
- Top 16: Alexandra Plotz (2012)
- Top 20: Vivica Lewandowski (2023)

Illinois holds a record of 15 placements at Miss Teen USA.

=== Awards ===
- Miss Photogenic: Linda Burkholder (1983), Lisa Jessen (1985), Kathleen McClellan (1988)

== Winners ==
- Declared as Winner
- Ended as runner-up
- Ended as one of the finalists or semifinalists

Year	Name	Hometown	Age^{1}	Local title	Placement at Miss Teen USA	Special awards at Miss Teen USA	Notes
2026	Scarlet Mcllrath	Bureau	18	Miss Arlington Teen			
2025	Sophia Xia	Chicago	19	Miss Lake County Teen			
2024	Arianna Thompson	Mahomet	17	Miss Central Illinois Teen	Top 10		
2023	Vivica Lewandowski	Chicago	18	Miss Gold Coast Teen	Top 20		Daughter of Mandy Lane Lewandowski, Miss Illinois USA 1998; Later Miss Illinois USA 2026
2022	Dawn Parks	Chicago	18	Miss Cook County Teen			
2021	Gissell Bahena	Chicago	17	Miss Chicago Midwest Teen			
2020	Victoria Blair Rhemrev	Long Grove	17	Miss North Shore Teen			First Asian American Miss Illinois Teen USA
2019	A’Maiya Allen	Bolingbrook	18	Miss Greater Bolingbrook Teen	Top 15		
2018	Sydni Dion Bennett	Algonquin	16	Miss Chicago Teen	3rd Runner-Up		First African American Miss Illinois Teen USA; Later Miss Illinois USA 2021; 3rd runner-up at Miss USA 2021
2017	Olivia Bohleber	Carmi	18	Miss White County Teen			
2016	Olivia Natalia Pura	Deer Park	17	Miss Deer Park Teen	Top 15		Later Miss Illinois USA 2020; Top 10 at Miss USA 2020
2015	Megan Riesner	Plainfield	18	Miss Will County Teen			
2014	Miranda Fenzau	Chicago	17				
2013	Grayson Hodgkiss	Downers Grove	16				
2012	Alexandra Marie "Alex" Plotz	Geneva	17		Top 16		Later Miss Illinois USA 2019
2011	Paige Higgerson	Cutler	19				
2010	Alexis "Lexi" Atkins	Champaign	18		1st runner-up		Later Miss Illinois USA 2014
2009	Stacie Lauren Juris	Tinley Park	18				Later Miss Illinois USA 2013; 2nd runner-up at Miss USA 2013
2008	Nora Downs	Chicago	16				
2007	Victoria Davis	Thawville	18		Top 15		
2006	Ceitlyn Glenn	Effingham	17				
2005	Kelly Cruse	Marion	17		3rd runner-up		
2004	Brittany Acosta	Warrenville	16				
2003	Tiffiney McCormick	Streator	18				
2002	Lacey Wilson	Hinsdale	17				Later Miss Massachusetts USA 2010
2001	Brittany Richmond	Bristol	17	Miss Bristol Teen			
2000	Kimberly "Kim" Williamson	Goodfield	18				First runner-up at Miss Illinois Teen USA 1999; Died on December 27, 2004
1999	Amber Elizabeth Dusak	Antioch	18				
1998	Nicole DeAnn Manske	Roscoe	18		Semi-finalist		ESPN personality and wife of Australian INDYCAR driver Ryan Briscoe.
1997	Autumn Nicole Waterbury	Marion	18		1st runner-up		
1996	Eisa Istok	Elgin	18				
1995	Anne-Marie Dixon	Highland	17		Top 6		Later Miss Oklahoma USA 1998
1994	Charlotte Ann Martin	Charleston	18				
1993	Jaime Lyn Holbrook	Cave-In-Rock	16				
1992	Julee Kleffman	Hoffman Estates	18		Semi-finalist		
1991	Kara Kline	Champaign	15				
1990	Teri Bollinger	Dupo	18				Later Miss Missouri USA 1999
1989	Kimberly "Kim" Hannell	Chicago	18				
1988	Kathleen "Kathy" McClellan	Duncan	18		3rd runner-up	Miss Photogenic	
1987	Danielle Reese	Riverwoods	16				
1986	Dyann Lowery	Sandwich	17				Later fourth runner-up at Miss Illinois USA 1988
1985	Lisa Jessen	Macomb	17		Semi-finalist	Miss Photogenic	
1984	Cherise Haugen	Sleepy Hollow	17		Miss Teen USA 1984	Best State Costume	Non-finalist at Miss USA 1984
1983	Linda Burkholder	Lansing	17	Miss Lansing Teen		Miss Photogenic	

^{1} Age at the time of the Miss Teen USA pageant
