= Soul Survivor (film) =

- VHS cover
- Directed by: Stephen Williams
- Screenplay by: Stephen Williams
- Produced by: Paul Brown
- Starring: George Harris; Peter Williams; Clark Johnson
- Cinematography: David Franco
- Edited by: Jeff Warren
- Music by: John McCarthy
- Production company: Miracle Pictures
- Distributed by: Xenon Entertainment(Canada); Norstar Entertainment(International)
- Release dates: January 4, 1995 (Sundance Film Festival); September 12, 1995 (Worldwide)
- Running time: 89 minutes
- Country: Canada
- Language: English

Soul Survivor is a 1995 Canadian drama film directed by Stephen Williams, who also wrote the screenplay. Produced by Paul Brown, the film stars George Harris, Peter Williams, and Clark Johnson and is set in Toronto's African-Caribbean sector.

== Plot ==
Tyrone Taylor (Peter Williams) is a Jamaican immigrant living in Toronto and working as a hairdresser at a local salon. He does not enjoy working at the salon and is looking for ways to easy money, in order to quit his job. He starts collecting debts for Winston Price (George Harris), a local gangster and owner of a nearby nightclub. Though Tyrone's new job under Price is violent and illegal, he tries to rationalize it by talking himself into the belief that he will soon have enough money to quit and go into a cleaner business. His jobs become more and more violent and one day he is forced to collect money from his cousin Reuben (David Smith), who will not pay back. Tyrone takes his side and guarantees his ability to pay to Price. Tyrone's girlfriend Annie (Judith Scott) and his family, who soon find out about Tyrone's new employment, try talking him out the job, warning him of all the dangers that come with it. Tyrone however, continues, believing he is too careful to get caught.

== Cast ==
- Peter Williams as Tyrone Taylor
- George Harris as Winston Price
- Clark Johnson as Busha
- David Smith as Reuben
- Judith Scott as Annie
- Arden Bess as Papa
- Leonie Forbes as G'ma T
- Denise Jones as Cherry

== Production ==
Director Stephen Williams explained the journey of Tyrone was loosely based on his personal experiences when first moving to Toronto from Jamaica.

Stephen Williams also commented on working with his brother Peter (Tyrone Taylor) and what it was like, shooting an emotional scene: "It was really hard, it was really painful to watch. [...] I would have felt that for any actor, but more so because he's my brother. I felt badly that I put him through that, but the scene required that kind of emotional response and we had to do it. That took me by surprise. We shot a love scene, for instance, and it didn't feel any different than shooting a love scene with any actor, but for some reason this one here of him crying was painful to witness."

The film was partly funded by the Ontario Film Development Corporation and Telefilm Canada.

== Release ==
The film first premiered on January 4, 1995, at the Sundance Film Festival in Park City, Utah, though it did not compete. In May 1995, the film was shown during the International Critics' Week at the 1995 Cannes Film Festival, where it was hailed (along with Rude) as ushering in a new Black Canadian film aesthetic. It was then released worldwide on September 25, 1995, with a domestic Canadian distribution through Xenon Entertainment and an international distribution through Norstar Entertainment. On September 23, 1997, the film was released on VHS and in June 2003 on DVD.

== Reception ==
Leonard Klady of Variety magazine writes: "While a seemingly familiar tale of urban, ethnic plight, Soul Survivor gets added mileage from its unique setting in the Afro-Caribbean sector of Toronto. A relatively straightforward drama, film's interwoven tales are elevated by assured direction and performances that convey authenticity. A decidedly upscale effort, it should travel well on the arthouse circuit domestically and in foreign climes."

== Accolades ==
| Year | Award | Category | Recipients and nominees | Results |
|---|---|---|---|---|
| 1996 | Genie Awards | Best Actor in a Leading Role | Peter Williams | Nominated |
| 1996 | Genie Awards | Best Original Screenplay | Stephen Williams | Nominated |
