= Peter Williams (actor, born 1957) =

Jamaican-Canadian actor

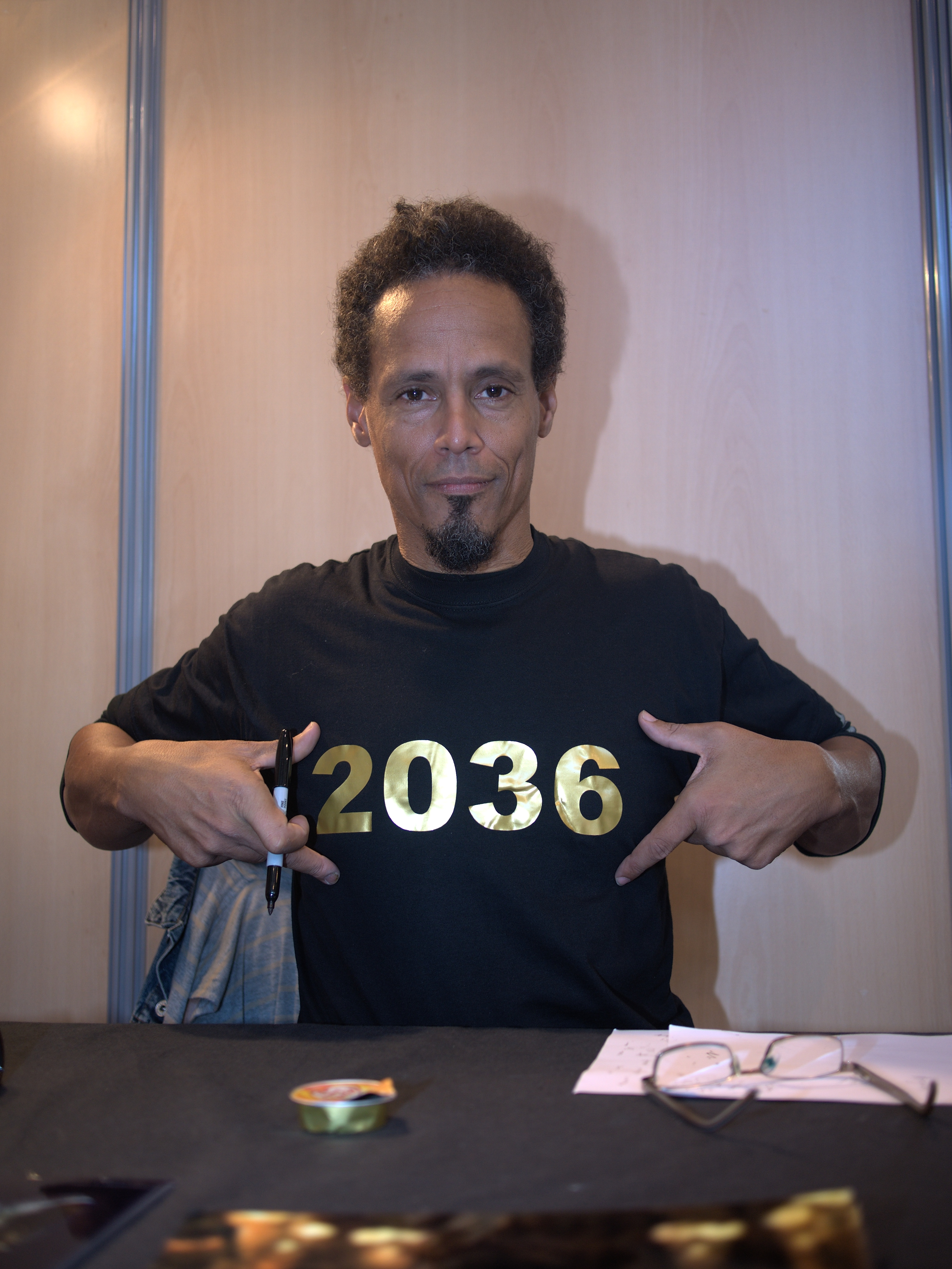
- Williams in 2010
- Born: December 31, 1957 (age 68); Kingston, Jamaica
- Citizenship: Jamaica; Canada
- Occupation: Actor
- Years active: 1982–present

Peter Williams (born 31 December 1957) is a Jamaican-born Canadian actor. He is known for playing Apophis, a primary antagonist on Stargate SG-1.

== Career ==
The majority of his work has been in television, including his role as the primary villain Apophis in the first four seasons of Stargate SG-1 (plus a few appearances thereafter). However, he has also appeared on the big screen in films such as Catwoman and The Chronicles of Riddick. His brother Stephen is also in the entertainment business, and has directed several episodes of television shows including Dark Angel, Crossing Jordan, and Lost.

In 1995, two years prior to Stargate SG-1's premiere, Williams starred in the 1995 movie Jungleground with three other actors from the Stargate franchise: Torri Higginson (Elizabeth Weir), J. R. Bourne (Martouf), and Lexa Doig (Dr. Lam).

In 2007, he played the lead, Gene Wright, in Frances-Anne Solomon's feature film A Winter Tale.

== Filmography ==
=== Television ===
- The Expanse (2017), Santichai Suputayaporn
- Fallen (2006), Kolazonta
- Stargate SG-1 (1997–2005), Apophis
- Life as We Know It (2004), Hal Morello
- Legend of Earthsea (2004), Kargide Soldier #2
- Dead Like Me (2004), Angelo
- Show Me Yours (2004), Marshall
- Eve's Christmas (2004), Brother James
- The Collector (2004), Gangsta
- The Twilight Zone (2003), Tyrone
- Da Vinci's Inquest (1998–2002), Morris Winston
- Dark Angel (2002), Hal
- Mysterious Ways (2001), Raphael Vasquez
- Relic Hunter (2001), Shandar
- Viper (1999), Devon Zerbo
- The Outer Limits (1999), Chili Wayne
- The X-Files (1998), Jackson
- Night Man (1998)
- Welcome to Paradox (1998), Dr. Ben Polaris
- Due South (1994), Gerome
- Neon Rider (1989–1994), Pin
- Wiseguy (1989), Wingate
- MacGyver (1988), Moe

=== Movies ===
- Stargate: Continuum (2008), Apophis
- A Winter Tale (2007), Gene Wright
- Catwoman (2004), Detective #2
- The Chronicles of Riddick (2004), Convict #2
- Liberty Stands Still (2002), Driver
- G-Saviour (1999), Halloway
- Love Come Down (2000), Leon Carter
- A Good Burn (2000), Ruben
- Holiday Heart (2000), Phillip St. Paul
- Sweetwater: A True Rock Story (1999), Albert Moore
- Little Boy Blues (1999), Casino Dealer #2
- Moment of Truth: Into the Arms of Danger (1997), Frank
- She Woke Up Pregnant (1996), Undercover cop
- Halifax f.p: Words Without Music (1994), Milkie
- Someone to Die For (1995), Ray Jackson
- Soul Survivor (1995), Tyrone - Williams Nominated for Genie Award for Best Performance by an Actor in a Leading Role
- Jungleground (1995), Dragon
- Dying to Remember (1993), New York Cabbie
- The Odd Couple: Together Again (1993), Raphael
- Bound and Gagged: A Love Story (1992), Mr. Williams
- Mystery Date (1991), Bartender
- Run (1991), Cab Driver
- The Widowmaker (1990), Philip Newsome
- A Waltz Through the Hills (1988), Driver
- Drop-Out Mother (1988)
- The Hospital (1985), Intern in Elevator
- Heatwave (1982), Graydon Perkins
