= A Goat's Tail =

- Directed by: Julius Amedume
- Written by: Julius Amedume
- Produced by: Julius Amedume; Leon Johnson
- Starring: Godfred Nortey; Lesley Cook; Simon James Morgan; Jason Ramsay
- Cinematography: Julius Amedume
- Edited by: Julius Amedume; Anthony Redman
- Music by: Neil Clements
- Release date: 1 September 2006
- Running time: 120 minutes
- Countries: United Kingdom; Ghana
- Language: English

A Goat's Tail is a 2006 British-Ghanaian film and is the directorial debut feature of Julius Amedume who also wrote the script.

The film won the Best Feature award at the 2007 Los Angeles Pan African Film Festival.

== Plot ==
A young taxi driver named Kojo, is awoken on his break by a woman named Cynthia. Cynthia is a young actress visiting Ghana and hires Kojo as her guide around, their interaction ends with a sexual rendezvous. Cynthia reluctantly invites Kojo to the United Kingdom to live out his dream as a poet. He soon understands that it is not all as it seems as he encounters an underworld of drug culture.

== Cast ==
- Simon James Morgan as Jimmy
- Jason Ramsey as Adrian
- Danny John-Jules
- Lesley Cook as Cynthia
- M.C Creed as Fredrick
- Kwabena Paul Akorfaala as Kojo
- Godfred Nortey as Kojo
- Adrian Philips as Wayne

== Reception ==
Cinemagazine rated the film 3 stars.
