= Maya Chowdhry =

Maya Chowdhry (born 1964) is a British playwright, poet and transmedia interactive artist.

== Life ==
Maya Chowdhry was born in Edinburgh in 1964. She began writing as an adolescent:

I began writing to stay above water; I wrote to survive teenage years: crushes, exams, obsessional cooking – my poetry was a life-line. When my poetry was published I was asked to read at the launch – to perform my life. It slipped easily off the tongue: I had had years of performing answers to society's questions about my identities; I had written about the questions, searching for my true identity. Readings became performances, multi-media shows, commissions. Suddenly my identity was captured, fractured, sliced and served to audiences and I was a 'live' challenge to myself.

Chowdhry worked for Sheffield Film Co-op in the 1980s, and wrote theatre for young people in the 1990s. Like other black women playwrights such as Jackie Kay and Jacqueline Rudet, Chowdhry was helped by the appointment of the black woman producer Frances-Anne Solomon to BBC Radio 4.

Chowdhry's first play, Monsoon (1993), was broadcast as part of the BBC Young Playwrights' Festival. Monsoon portrays the return of sisters Jalaarnava and Kavitaa, two second-generation migrant young women, to their parents' birthplace in India. The play parallels the experience of menstruation with waiting for the seasonal monsoon. Chowdhry's play Kaahini (1997) was toured by Red Ladder, as one of a series of plays aimed primarily at Asian-British girls. Influenced by the story of Shikhandi in the Mahabharata, the play dramatizes a gender reversal narrative: a British Indian teenage girl, Esha, is brought up by her parents as a boy. After a close friend Farooq falls in love with Esha, she reveals herself to him as a girl and is forced to work through her gender identity.

In 2000 Chowdhry moved into digital work, and received an Arts Council Year of the Artist Award for her digital work destinyNation.

In 2015 Chowdhry collaborated with poet Sarah Hymas on "poetic sculptures" exploring the fragility of life and anthropogenic climate change.

In April 2020 Chowdhry was awarded a COVID-19 Creative Commission from Greater Manchester Combined Authority.

== Works ==
=== Plays ===
- (with Jag Rahi Hai) Putting in the Pickle Where the Jam Should Be, Write Back, 1989.
- Monsoon. In Monsoon: Six Plays By Black & Asian Women, Aurora Metro Press, 1993.
- The Crossing Path. In New Plays for Young People, Faber and Faber, 2003.
- Kaahini. Edinburgh: Capercaillie, 2004.

=== Other writing ===
- Contributions in As Girls Could Boast: New Poetry by Women, 1994.
- "Living Performance". Journal of Lesbian Studies. Volume 2, 1998. doi:10.1300/J155v02n02_02
- 'Healing Strategies for Women at War', in Seven Black Women Poets, Crocus Press, 1999.
- "k/not theory; a self dialogue", Journal of Lesbian Studies. Volume 4, 2000. doi:10.1300/J155v04n04_05
- (ed. with Mary Sharratt) Bitch Lit. Manchester: Crocus, 2006.
- The seamstress and the global garment. Manchester : Crocus debuts/Suitcase, 2009.
- Fossil. Leeds, England: Peepal Tree, 2016.
