= Parv Bancil =

British actor (1967–2017)

- Born: Parveen Singh Bancil; 7 February 1967; Moshi, Tanzania
- Died: 1 April 2017 (aged 50); Camden, London, United Kingdom
- Occupation: Playwright
- Spouse: Shivani Ghai (divorced)

Parv Bancil (7 February 1967 – 1 April 2017) was a British-Asian playwright and actor.

== Life and career ==
Parveen Singh Bancil was born in Moshi, Tanzania, in 1967 into an Indian Sikh family, the son of Sohan Singh Bancil and Amrit (Arjan) Kaur Bancil. He was the grandson of Sardar Jogindar Singh Bancil of JS Bancil Building Contractors of Moshi, Tanzania. His maternal grandfather was Sardar Jawala Singh of Messrs Milkha Singh and Jawala Singh Building Contractors and Saw Millers, of Arusha Tanzania. The family moved to London in 1968, where his mother died when he was two years old. He grew up in Hounslow, leaving school at the age of 15. He began writing plays in 1985.

=== HAC period ===
In 1986, aged 19, Bancil joined Hounslow Arts Co-op. One of four professional British Asian theatre companies at the time, HAC was the only one to be telling stories from a second-generation British Asian perspective. While most were writing about partition, or leaving their homeland, Parv Bancil was writing about his world, and tackling issues that were affecting British Asian youth, such as gang culture, drugs, crime and identity. Bancil's first play, co-written with Ravinder Gill, was Curse Of The Dead Dog (1986). It portrays three young Asian men who while away their time drinking beer. Their effort to set up a sound system for a benefit gig is sabotaged by the local Southall gang. The play was followed by How's Your Skull Does It Fit (1987), Kings (1988) and Bad Company (1989). Bancil gained a reputation as a dynamic, uncompromising and controversial writer. He also acted in many plays, was the founder member of One Nation Under A Groove Innit (an umbrella organization that produced comedy), was one half of a comic double act called The Khrai Twins, based on two bumbling drunken Southall gangsters, and a member of a comedy trio called the Sycophantic Sponge Bunch. He was also part of a spoof rock band called The Dead Jalebies. Formed in 1987, they toured nationally and opened for Asian Dub Foundation in 1991 at the Camden Underworld. They also supported the Voodoo Queens band in 1993.

=== Nadir ===
After HAC closed in 1990, Bancil became a freelance writer. In 1991 he won a BBC Radio 4 Young Playwright Award for his play Nadir, about a young second-generation Asian man fresh out of prison. It was produced and directed by Frances-Anne Solomon, and performed by actors Rita Wolf, Nina Wadia, Neran Persaud and Ravinder Gill. "I wrote a play for BBC Radio set in the near future when Britain was being run by an extreme right-wing government. Everyone had to swear allegiance to the country and if they didn't adhere to British culture they were not welcome. The BBC tried to ban it until four producers stood by me and put their necks on the line for it. The critics said it was laughable, that it would never happen. But now we have an immigration policy and people do have to swear allegiance to the flag (the so-called Britishness test where applicants for citizenship have to demonstrate a knowledge and integration of British culture)."

=== Ungrateful Dead ===
In 1993, Bancil wrote Ungrateful Dead, a play about a young Sikh man's descent into a world of gangs, violence and drugs. The play had a huge impact on audiences, and lead to a residency at the Royal Court Theatre.

=== Papa Was A Bus Conductor ===
In 1995 Bancil wrote Papa Was A Bus Conductor, a comedy satire about a dysfunctional family that was an early flowering of the British Asian comedy boom that spawned Goodness Gracious Me. It was his first play to receive a Time Out magazine's Critics Choice, and it was the first of its kind to spark a trend for a whole spate of Asian comedy that followed over the next 10 years.

=== Crazy Horse ===
Bancil's next two plays were to define him as one of the "In Yer Face" writers that dominated the '90s. In 1997, he wrote Crazy Horse. It follows Jas, a young man trying to deal with the death of his mother by losing himself in a world of petty crime, until a tragic accident forces an estranged father and son to confront each other, but with sinister consequences. It was developed through 'Wild Lunch' with Sarah Kane and was directed by Vicky Featherstone, and received another Time Out Critics Choice.

=== Made In England ===
The following year, Bancil then wrote Made In England, initially commissioned as a 15-minute piece by the Red Room. It was first performed as a full-length play in October 1998. Set against the backdrop of the music industry and "cool Britannia", Made In England looked at the idea of trading your cultural identity for success. This play received Time Out Critics Choice twice. It was published in the Black and Asian Plays: Anthology (2000).

=== Later work ===
Bollywood Or Bust (1999), a farcical comedy, and Recall (2000), a combined dance theatre piece with Darshan Singh Bhullar, followed. The next few years saw Papa and Made In England re-staged and Bancil also began to become known as a cultural commentator, writing articles for magazines and newspapers, and often contributing to radio and television debate. He began to write and present TV documentaries and ventured into film and screen writing. In 2007 came another collaboration with Bhullar for Find Me Amongst The Black, and from 2008 to 2009 he was on an attachment with The Soho Theatre. In 2010 he had two new stage plays, Dead Leaves and Rude Boy, ready to go into production. After taking a year out to study film-making, Bancil began writing screenplays. He also became known as a cultural commentator. In a 2008 piece for The Guardian, he asked: "What have multicultural arts policies done for us?"

== Personal life ==
He was married to actress Shivani Ghai. He died in London on 1 April 2017.
