= Belmont, Port of Spain =

District of Port of Spain, Trinidad and Tobago

Coordinates: 10.6653°N 61.4847°W

Belmont
- District of Port of Spain
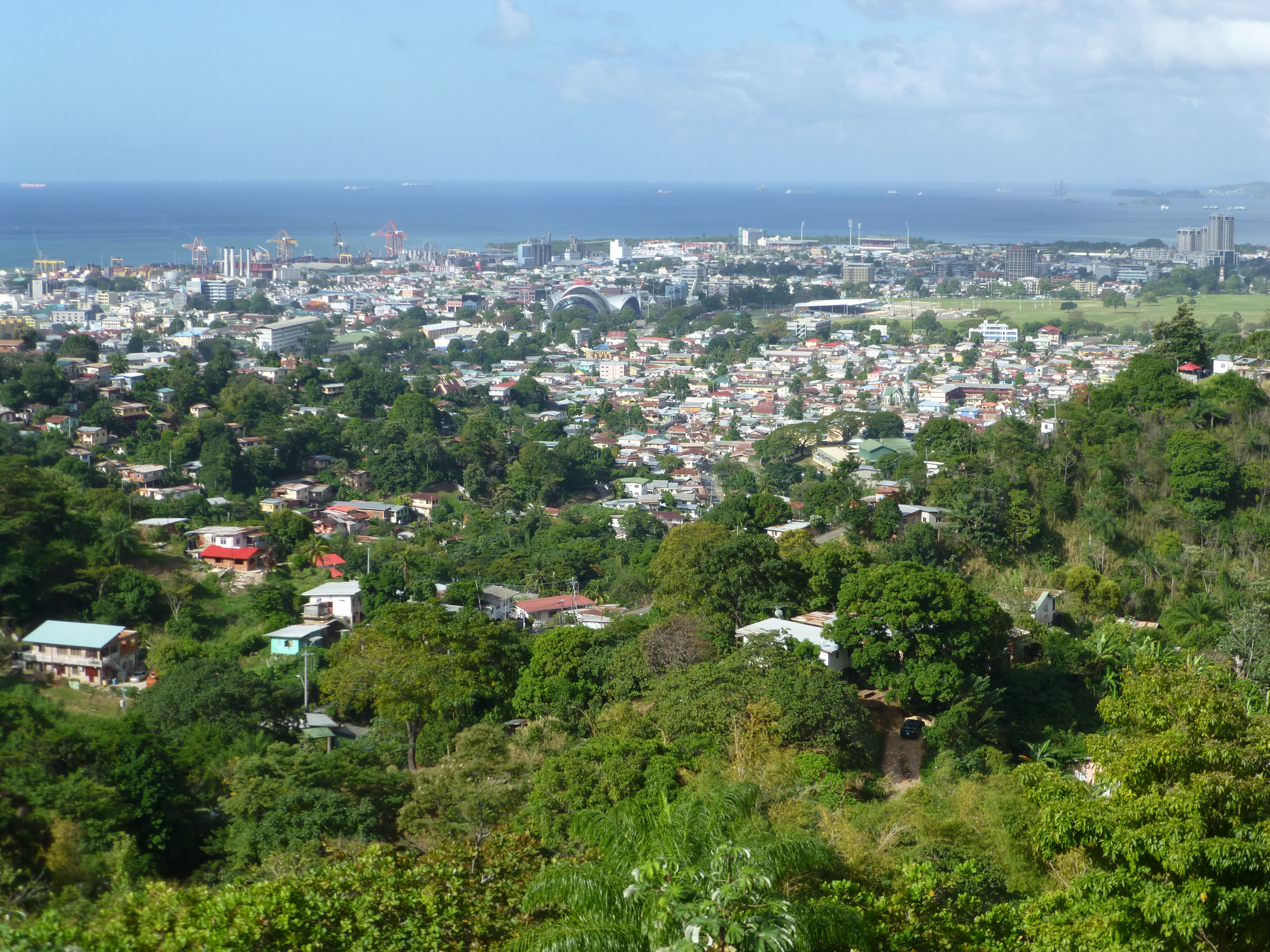
- View of Belmont in Port of Spain.
- Interactive map of Belmont
- Country: Trinidad and Tobago
- County: Saint George County
- City: Port of Spain
- District: Belmont

Population (2011)
  - Total: 9,035
- Time zone: UTC-4 (AST)
  - Summer (DST): UTC-4 (DST)
- Area code: 621

Belmont, in north-east Port of Spain, in the Republic of Trinidad and Tobago, is located at the foot of the Laventille Hills; it was the city's first suburb. In the 1840s–'50s, parts of the area were settled by Africans rescued by the Royal Navy from illegal slaving ships. In the 1880s–'90s, the population swelled rapidly, and the characteristic Belmont street pattern of narrow, winding lanes developed. The black professional class built large homes in Belmont, as they were excluded from the more expensive neighbourhoods such as St. Clair and Maraval; Belmont became known as "the Black St. Clair". Many of these large homes have been renovated and converted to business use, but some remain in family hands. Belmont currently is a lower-middle to middle-class residential neighbourhood. It was the birthplace and early home of many important Carnival designers and bandleaders. Belmont has 9,035 inhabitants.

== Buildings in Belmont ==
One of the more recent renovations in Belmont that was done with a view to preserving the historic character of the building is Myler House. The image in the attached link, is that of Myler House. This house is located on Myler Street and Belmont Circular Road, Belmont. According to Let me tell you about My Island site, "the first President of the Republic of Trinidad and Tobago was born on Myler Street".

Other buildings that are either historic due to the age of the existing building or the principle on which the property was established to be used are as follows:

- St Jude's Home for Girls, located on the Belmont Circular Road. St Jude's was established in 1923, according to the image located on its website.
- The St. Dominic's Home, which is located on the Belmont Circular Road, is in close proximity to St. Jude's Home. St. Dominic's Home is located in the St. Dominic's Compound and has been in existence for approximately 145 years.
- L'Hospice – this home for the aged is located in close proximity to Charlotte and Park Streets, and has been in existence for approximately 159 years.

There are schools and churches of at least two denominations that are located within Belmont. These are Anglican and Catholic schools and churches. There is also a tertiary educational institute that falls under the auspices of the Roman Catholic Archdiocese of Port of Spain – CREDI – Catholic Religious Education Development Institute. This institute is located in the St. Dominic's compound and offers undergraduate and post-graduate programmes, along with certificate programmes and short courses.

Belmont is famous for having one of the few churches in the island, which is dedicated to St. Francis of Assisi. This church is located on the Belmont Circular Road and is approximately 114 years old.

== Cemeteries located in Belmont ==
Although taxi drivers who ply the Belmont route speak of the number of cemeteries that are located in the area, the website "Burial Grounds, Cemeteries & Cremation sites in Trinidad" lists one cemetery with an address located in Belmont, under the heading of Port of Spain, the cemetery referred to being "St. Margaret of Antioch Anglican Church Cemetery, St. Margaret’s Lane, Belmont". Although the address of the cemetery is listed as St. Margaret's Lane, the church and cemetery are also accessed from the Belmont Circular Road, Belmont as the property is situated on a corner.

== Famous persons from Belmont ==
LeRoy Clarke is one of the well-known artists of Trinidad and Tobago. Some of his works are on display at the Unit Trust Corporation Head Office on Independence Square, Port of Spain. His works are done in oil and are abstract in concept. In 1998, he was the first to be conferred the title Master Artist by the National Museum and Art Gallery of Trinidad and Tobago. His hometown was Gonzalez, Belmont.

Other famous persons from Belmont include:

- Stokely Carmichael a.k.a. Kwame Ture - civil rights era leader in the United States of America
- Ellis Clarke - first President of the Republic of Trinidad and Tobago
- Ulric Cross - jurist, diplomat to the United Kingdom, and Royal Air Force navigator
- Claudia Jones - journalist, activist and founder of the Notting Hill Carnival.
- Horace Ové - director and filmmaker
- David Rudder - calypsonian
