= Clive Hollick, Baron Hollick =

British businessman (born 1945)

The Right Honourable The Lord Hollick
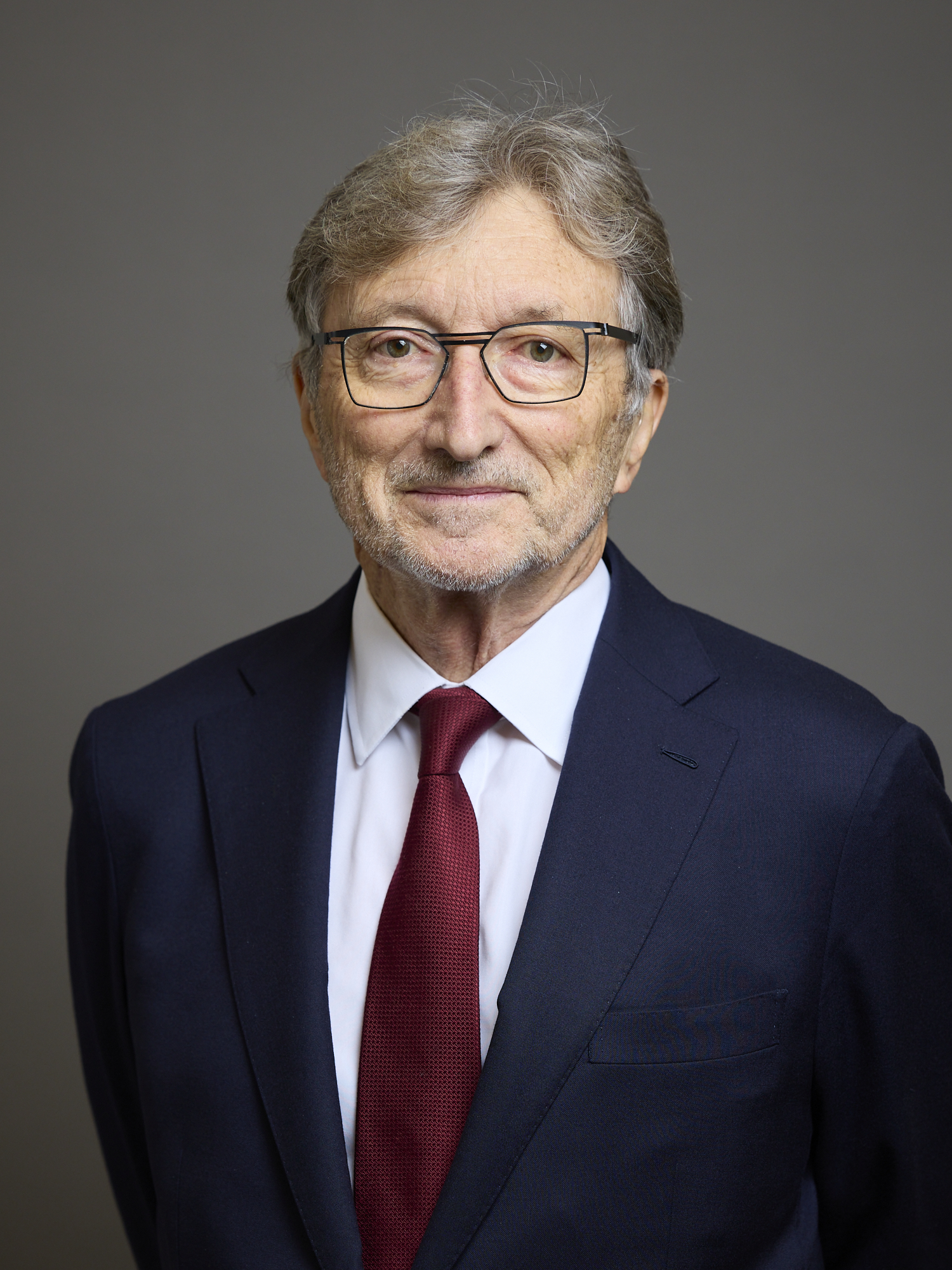
- Official portrait, 2024

Chair of the Economic Affairs Committee
- In office 12 June 2014 – 27 April 2017
- Preceded by: The Lord MacGregor of Pulham Market
- Succeeded by: The Lord Forsyth of Drumlean

Member of the House of Lords
- Lord Temporal
- Life peerage 20 June 1991

Personal details
- Born: 20 May 1945 (age 81) Southampton, England
- Party: Labour
- Spouse: Sue Woodford-Hollick
- Education: University of Nottingham
- Occupation: Businessman

Clive Richard Hollick, Baron Hollick (born 20 May 1945) is a British businessman with media interests, and a supporter of the Labour Party.

== Early life and career ==
Hollick was born in Southampton, the son of Olive Mary (née Scruton) and Leslie George Hollick. He was educated at Taunton's Grammar School, Southampton, and then studied Politics, Psychology, and Sociology at the University of Nottingham. He joined Hambros Bank as a graduate trainee in 1967 and rapidly gained a reputation as a financier and a dealmaker, in 1973 becoming the bank's youngest-ever director.

== Vavasseur and MAI ==
The following year, Hollick became chief executive of JH Vavasseur Group, a failing money broker caught up in the 1973-4 secondary banking crisis. By 1978 the Vavasseur merchant bank was financially secure once again, and Hollick was building it into a successful media company, renaming the group Mills & Allen International (MAI) after taking over advertising billboard company Mills and Allen. The group continued to grow with diversification during the 1980s, expanding into market research and business information services, and buying the National Opinion Polls (NOP) group in 1989 from the Daily Mail & General Trust.

MAI moved into television in 1993, when its subsidiary Meridian Broadcasting won the ITV franchise for South and South East England. The following year it bought Anglia Television for £292m, and in 1995 a 14.8% share in Yorkshire-Tyne Tees, and was a major shareholder in the consortium that was granted the franchise for Channel 5.

== United News and Media ==
In March 1996 the group merged with United Newspapers, publishers of the Daily Express, Daily Star, and a string of local newspapers, to form United News & Media, an international media group with revenues of £2.3 billion and 16,000 employees. Many thought Hollick would meet his match in Lord Stevens of Ludgate, proprietor of United; but it was Stevens who was sidelined as Hollick became chief executive, and within 18 months the Express had undergone a radical shift of political affiliation, dropping its long-standing support for the Conservative Party to become an enthusiastic proponent of Tony Blair's New Labour.

UNM was required to sell its stake in Yorkshire-Tyne Tees as part of the merger, giving Granada control, but the next year it was permitted to add a third ITV franchise to its holdings, HTV, the broadcaster for Wales and the West Country. As ITV continued to consolidate, Hollick proposed to take over Carlton in 2000, which would have made him the dominant player on the network. But his plans were blocked by the then Secretary of State at the DTI, Stephen Byers, who ruled that the merger would only be acceptable if Hollick gave up the prized Meridian franchise – making the deal pointless. Unable to proceed, Hollick sold the three ITV franchises to Granada in July 2000 for £1.75 billion. The UNM share price dived 13% on the news, but history has since revealed that Hollick sold out right at the top of the market. Ironically, the last restrictions on ITV company joint ownership were lifted by the Communications Act 2003, and in February 2004 Granada and Carlton merged to form a single entity ITV plc controlling all of the ITV franchises in England and Wales.

Other parts of UNM were also disposed of advantageously, including the demerging of MAI's original securities business in 1998 as Garban, which subsequently became ICAP; the sale in 1998 of United's Provincial Newspapers including the Yorkshire Post to Johnston Press; the controversial sale of Express Newspapers in 2000 to Richard Desmond, then the owner of a number of pornographic magazines; the sale of the NOP World market research business to GfK in 2005; and the sale of United's 35% stake in Channel 5 to RTL in 2005.

UNM, renamed United Business Media in 2000, is now strongly focussed on business-to-business publications, information services and exhibitions. Principal subsidiaries are PR Newswire, acquired by United in 1982, and CMP Media, acquired in 1999.

== Current activities and other interests ==
Hollick retired as CEO of United Business Media in April 2005 at the age of 60. He immediately became a managing partner at private equity firm KKR, focussing on the media and financial services sectors. This led to speculation that KKR might launch a bid for ITV. In 2006, he was appointed to the supervisory board of media conglomerate VNU, after KKR and Blackstone Group won a difficult takeover battle. He is also vice-chairman of the supervisory board of SBS Broadcasting Group, taken over by KKR and Permira in August 2005, into which in 2007 was merged the German satellite broadcaster ProSiebenSat.1 Media. Hollick is also a director of Diageo (since 2001), and Honeywell International (since 2003).

Other directorships Hollick has held include Hambros Bank, 1973–96; Shepperton Studios (chairman), 1976–79; National Bus Company, 1984–91; Department of Applied Economics, Cambridge University, 1988–95; Logica, 1987–92; British Aerospace, 1992–97 and TRW Inc from 2000-2002. From 2002 to 2008, he was Chairman of the South Bank Centre arts complex in London. He is currently a member of investment bank Jefferies Global Senior Advisory Board.

Hollick has been a longtime supporter and donor to the Labour Party, and was one of the founding backers of the New Labour think tank the Institute for Public Policy Research (IPPR). For a time after the 1997 election, he served as a special advisor to Margaret Beckett and Peter Mandelson at the Department of Trade and Industry. Hollick is a supporter of the 2020 Vision political campaign run by Charles Clarke and Alan Milburn, and currently co-ordinating funds for the campaign. In 2020, he donated £50,000 to Sir Keir Starmer's Labour Party leadership campaign. He is a former Patron of Prisoners Abroad, a charity that supports the welfare of Britons imprisoned overseas and their families.

Hollick has been a partner at the leading European technology and media investment bank GP Bullhound since 2010.

Horllick is a senior advisor at London-based venture firm Hambro Perks.

== Personal life ==
He was created a life peer on 20 June 1991, as Baron Hollick, of Notting Hill in the Royal Borough of Kensington & Chelsea. He is married to Sue Woodford-Hollick and has three daughters.

Orders of precedence in the United Kingdom
Preceded by The Lord Griffiths of Fforestfach	Gentlemen; Baron Hollick	Followed by The Lord Craig of Radley
