= Julius Amedume =

Ghanaian-British director

- Born: Julius Amedume; 6 June 1977 (age 49); Ewe, Ghana
- Education: National Film and Television School
- Occupations: Director, Writer, Producer
- Years active: 2002–present

Julius Amedume (born 6 June 1977), is a Ghanaian-British director, writer and producer. He is best known for directing the award-winning feature films A Goat's Tail and Rattlensnakes.

== Personal life ==
He was born on 6 June 1977 in Ewe, eastern Ghana.

== Career ==
He obtained his Bachelor of Science degree (BSC Hons.) in communication and technology. He was able to move to England after he was awarded a Toledo scholarship, where he completed his master's degree in directing fiction at the National Film and Television School. His first major film work was the short documentary Canal Plus in Belgium and France about the Cinefondation award at the 2001 Cannes Film Festival. In the meantime, he wrote and directed four short films including The Meeting, The Video Tape, and The Phone Call. In 2006, he directed his maiden feature film A Goat's Tail which was later won the Best Feature award at the 2007 Los Angeles Pan African Film Festival. Meanwhile, he founded his production company, "Amedume Films".

In 2009, he directed the short Mary and John, which was later nominated for Best Short at the 2009 Rushes Soho Film Festival and a Golden Lion at the 2010 Taipei county film festival in Taiwan. After the success of the short, he directed another award-winning short Lorraine. This short also nominated for Best Short at the 2010 Rushes Soho Film Festival. In 2010, his short Mr Graham was premiered at The 14th Urbanworld Film Festival in New York 2010. Then he made a film for his graduation with the title Precipice. This work was awarded the Best Short Film Award at the 7th Africa Movie Academy Awards, as well as an African Oscar for Best Diaspora Short at the 2011 African Movie Academy Awards (AMAA) in Nigeria.

After showing brilliance at the university, he became one of 18 the students from the British, French and Polish film schools to be selected by the MEDIA DESK UK to help develop his graduation film into a feature film. In 2012, he made his television directorial debut by making the serial Doctors. Then in 2014, he made the home movie That Thing That Happened which received critics acclaim. In 2019, he directed his second feature film Rattlensnakes which was premiered at the Los Angeles Pan African Festival. The film won the award for the Best Narrative Feature and the Micheal Anyiam Osigwe Award for African Oscar for Film By An African Abroad at the Africa International Film Festival and 15th Africa Movie Academy Awards. In the same year, he became a member of The Academy Of Motion Picture Arts and Sciences.

== Filmography ==
Year	Film	Role	Genre	Ref.
2002	The Meeting	Director, writer, Producer, Cinematographer	Short film	
2003	The Video Tape	Director, writer, Producer, Cinematographer	Short film	
2003	The Phone Call	Director, writer, Producer, Cinematographer	Short film	
2006	A Goat's Tail	Director, writer, Producer, Cinematographer, Editor	Film	
2009	Mary and John	Director, writer, Producer	Short film	
2009	Lorraine	Director, writer	Short film	
2010	Mr. Graham	Director, writer, Producer	Short film	
2010	Precipice	Director, writer	Short film	
2012	Doctors	Director	TV series	
2014	That Thing That Happened	Director, writer	TV movie	
2019	Rattlesnakes	Director, writer	Film	
