= Claire Prieto =

Canadian film director

- Born: 1945 (age 80–81); Port of Spain, Trinidad and Tobago
- Spouse(s): Roger McTair; Charles Fuller

Claire Prieto (born 1945) is a Canadian film director and producer, known as one of the first black filmmakers in Canada. Along with Roger McTair, Prieto was a partner in the Toronto-based production company, Prieto-McTair Productions, which operated from 1982 to 2007.

== Early life ==
Prieto was born in Trinidad in 1945. She immigrated to Toronto, Ontario with Roger McTair in 1970.

== Work ==
Prieto's films explore Canadian black history, culture and experience and were groundbreaking as works produced by Canadian women and people of colour. Her film Some Black Women (1977) was the first film made by independent black filmmakers in Canada and her 2003 series Lord Have Mercy! was the first Caribbean-Canadian sitcom. Meanwhile, Black Mother Black Daughter (1989), produced by Prieto and Sylvia Hamilton for the Canadian National Film Board Atlantic Branch, was the first film created by this branch to employ an all-female crew.

In addition to producing her own work, Prieto has mentored and supported other black filmmakers and film industry members over the course of her career. In 1988, Prieto co-founded the Black Film & Video Network (BFVN), which served as a resource for black producers, directors, and writers.

== Filmography ==
- Some Black Women (1977)
- It's Not an Illness (1979)
- Home to Buxton (1987)
- Black Mother Black Daughter (1988)
- Older, Stronger, Wiser (1989)
- Jennifer Hodge: The Glory and the Pain (1991)
- Love Songs (1999)
- Lord Have Mercy! (2003)
- How She Move (2007)

== Awards and nominations ==
Prieto's 2003 TV series Lord Have Mercy! was nominated for a Gemini award and an Academy of Canadian Cinema and Television Award for Best Comedy Series. Her 1992 short film Survivors was nominated for a Gemini award and her 1979 documentary It's Not an Illness was nominated for a Genie award. In 2010, Prieto was presented with a Lifetime Achievement award by the Caribbean Tales Film Festival.
