= Leonie Forbes =

Jamaican actress and broadcaster (1937–2022)

Leonie Forbes OD
- Born: Leonie Evadne Forbes; 14 June 1937; Kingston, Colony of Jamaica, British Empire
- Died: 25 October 2022 (aged 85); Jamaica
- Education: Royal Academy of Dramatic Art
- Occupations: Actress and broadcaster

Leonie Evadne Forbes OD (14 June 1937 – 25 October 2022) was a Jamaican actress, broadcaster and producer who was active in theatre, radio and television.

== Biography ==
Forbes born and grew up in Kingston, Jamaica. She attended Kingston Senior School before going on to Excelsior College and the Durham College of Commerce.

After leaving school, she worked as a typist at the University of the West Indies. Forbes later began working for playwright Barry Reckord, typing his scripts. She joined the new Jamaica Broadcasting Corporation (JBC) in 1959 as a radio announcer, and later won a scholarship to attend the Royal Academy of Dramatic Art (RADA) in England. Forbes spent six years at RADA studying radio, television, and stage techniques, at the same time working as a writer for BBC Caribbean and appearing in a number of television dramas – including Z-Cars, The Odd Man, Public Eye and Hugh and I. Her first appearance in professional theatre came in 1962, when she played in Lloyd Reckord's Busha Bluebeard.

In 1966, Forbes returned to Jamaica and resumed her work with the JBC. She lived in Australia from 1968 to 1970 while her husband worked at the University of Queensland, and during that time she acted in a number of radio dramas for the Australian Broadcasting Corporation, as well as working part-time as a drama teacher.

In 1972, Forbes was appointed head of Radio Two, the JBC's FM service. She was elevated to overall director of radio broadcasting in 1976. Forbes continued acting both during and after her time at the JBC. She appeared in many locally made plays and films, but also in overseas productions like Milk and Honey, The Orchid House, Soul Survivor, I Is A Long-Memoried Woman, What My Mother Told Me, Lord Have Mercy! and A Winter Tale. In 1980, Forbes was made an Officer of the Order of Distinction for her work. She published an autobiography in 2012.

Forbes died in Jamaica on 25 October 2022, aged 85.
