= Corporate Identification Number =

Company identifier in India

- Acronym: CIN
- Organisation: Ministry of Corporate Affairs, India
- No. of digits: 21
- Example: L01631KA2010PTC096843

A Corporate Identification Number (CIN) is a 21-digit alpha-numeric code issued to companies incorporated in India. CIN is unique identification number that is given by Registrar of Companies (ROC) of various states under the Ministry of Corporate Affairs (MCA). CINs are assigned to companies registered in India by the ROC located in states across the nation.

== Structure ==
CIN have 21 alpha-numeric characters. CIN can be broken down in six sections. Example of CIN issued by ROC– L01631KA2010PTC096843

- Section-1: The listing status
- Section-2: The industry code
- Section-3: The state code
- Section-4: The year of incorporation
- Section-5: The ownership
- Section-6: The registration number

== Importance ==
CIN is used for tracking all the aspects and activities of a company from its incorporation by the ROC and is required to be provided on all the transactions with the respective ROC.
