= Craft Identification Number =

Identifier for marine vessels in Europe

The Craft Identification Number (CIN) or Hull Identification Number (HIN), standardised as EN ISO 10087:2006, is a permanent unique fourteen-digit alphanumeric identifier issued to all marine vessels in Europe. The numbering system is mandated by the European Recreational Craft Directive and descended from the American Ship Hull number system. Larger vessels over 300 gross tonnage also receive a permanent international IMO ship identification number, and European vessels over 20 metres receive a permanent ENI number.

An example CID/HID might appear as "GB-ABC00042-A3-14", where "GB" is the ISO 3166-1 country code, "ABC" would be the Acme Boat Company's Manufacturer Identity Code (MIC); "00042" would be the forty-second hull constructed by the organisation; "A3" would be January 2013 for the date keel was laid to the nearest month and "99" denoted as the year 2014 as the particular model/specification number. Months are denoted from A...L for January...December.

In the United Kingdom, the British Marine Federation manage the issuing of Manufacturer Identity Code on behalf of the British Department for Business Innovation and Skills. Amateur boat builders in the United Kingdom may apply for one-off HIN from the Royal Yacht Association who will issue one number from their "GB-RYAxxxxx" range.
