= Frances-Anne Solomon =

British-Canadian director, producer, entrepreneur

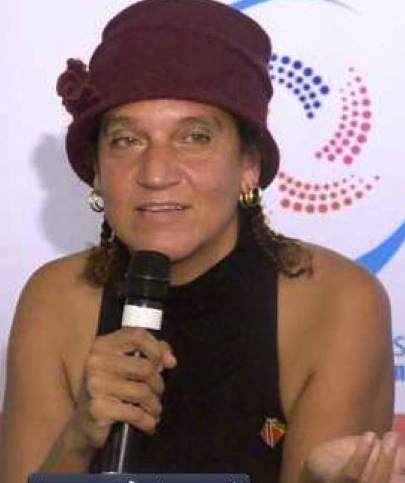
- Solomon in July 2012
- Born: 28 June 1966 (age 60); London, England
- Education: Theatre, Television Production, Directing
- Alma mater: University of Toronto
- Occupations: Filmmaker, producer
- Years active: 1990–present
- Known for: Film, television
- Style: Television drama, Film, radio drama.
- Website: http://francesannesolomon.net

Frances-Anne Solomon (born 28 June 1966) is a British-Caribbean-Canadian filmmaker, writer, producer, and distributor. She has lived in Britain, Trinidad & Tobago, and Toronto, Canada.

== Biography ==
Born in England of Trinidadian parents, who had gone to Britain in 1958, Frances-Anne Solomon began her professional life at the BBC in England, where she built a successful career as a producer, first with BBC Radio then with BBC television drama. She also produced and directed independent films through her company Leda Serene Films.

In 1999, she moved her company to Canada, where she continued to write, direct, and produce films, television programs, theatre plays, and new media projects. In 2001, she founded the CaribbeanTales Media Group, a charitable organisation producing, exhibiting and distributing educational multi-media projects based on Caribbean-heritage stories. The CaribbeanTales International Film Festival, founded in 2006 and based in Toronto, includes an annual festival, community screening series, and youth-focused film challenges. The CaribbeanTales Incubator Program develops original content for the regional and international market, CTFF also holds workshops and festivals in other territories, including to date New York, Barbados, Belize, South Africa, and Cuba. In 2010, Solomon founded CaribbeanTales Worldwide Distribution Inc, the first film distribution company in the English-speaking Caribbean dedicated to the marketing and sales of Caribbean-themed films. In 2014 she launched CaribbeanTales-TV, a video-on-demand platform. Solomon is a Director member of the Academy of Motion Picture Arts and Sciences.

== Early life ==
Solomon is the granddaughter of Trinidad and Tobago independence politician Dr. Patrick Solomon. When her grandfather left politics and took a role as a diplomat, the family lived in different countries including Canada, the United States, Europe and Venezuela. She moved back to Trinidad at nine years old, and attended the girls' "prestige" school, Bishop Anstey High School. At the age of 18 she moved to Canada to live with her mother, and discovered a love of the arts, studying theatre at the University of Toronto's U.C. Playhouse, and poetry with Jay Macpherson. In 1986, she moved to England, to work for the BBC.

== Career ==
She trained in television production through the two-year BBC Production Training Program and worked with Ebony, the corporation's first Black magazine programme, before being hired as a Radio Drama producer in London. While there she was responsible for helping to introduce a number of initiatives aimed at diversifying the talent pool in BBC Radio Drama. Many great talents got their first entry to Radio Drama in this way, including actors Adjoa Andoh and Clarence Smith to the BBC Drama Repertory Company, producers Pam Fraser Solomon and Nandita Ghose, composer Dominique Le Gendre and writers Parv Bancil, Maya Chowdhry, Rukhsana Ahmad, Tanika Gupta and Jackie Kay among others.

Solomon returned to television as a Script Editor for ScreenPlay, a strand of mostly studio-based TV dramas. Between 1992 and 1998 she worked as a script editor and then as a producer and executive producer for BBC Single Drama and Films under George S. J. Faber. For the BBC she produced and executive-produced feature films, including Speak Like a Child, director John Akomfrah's narrative debut, and Love Is The Devil, John Maybury's award-winning first feature. She credits her time at the BBC as providing her with a grounding, and vision of the importance and creative power of public service broadcasting.

In 1993, Solomon won a place on the prestigious BBC Drama Directors Course. While working as a Drama Producer for the BBC, she continued to run her own company Leda Serene Films, where she developed, produced and directed films including What My Mother Told Me, a Trinidad-based autobiographical story of generational violence in the context of a middle-class family; and Peggy Su!, produced by BBC Films. Set in a Chinese laundry in Liverpool in the 1960s, it remains one of the few British films to depict the lives of the Chinese in Britain.

Ultimately she found the racism of the British film and television industry constraining, and like many of her peers, chose to emigrate. Returning to Canada in 2000, she founded the CaribbeanTales Media Group and continued to develop and produce television, feature films and new media projects. Lord Have Mercy!, produced with Claire Prieto and Vanz Chapman, was Canada's first multicultural sitcom, and starred Russell Peters alongside Caribbean stars Leonie Forbes and Dennis "Sprangalang" Hall. A Winter Tale, CityTV, 2007, depicts a Caribbean-Canadian community plagued by gun violence in Toronto. Solomon is the director of HERO, her third feature, inspired by the life and Times of Trinidad and Tobago war hero, judge and jurist Ulric Cross.

Solomon was the recipient of the 2018 Visionary Award from the ReelWorld Film Festival.

On 1 July 2019 Solomon was one of 842 new members invited to join the Academy of Motion Picture Arts and Science. The 2019 class is 50 per cent women, 29 per cent people of color, and represents 59 countries.

== CaribbeanTales ==
=== CaribbeanTales Inc ===
CaribbeanTales Inc a not-for-profit company was formed in 2001, originally as an internet platform for Caribbean-themed film and arts. Early projects include CaribbeanTales.ca, a multimedia e-newsletter, and Literature Alive, a multi-faceted project including an educational website, audio books, and a documentary series, profiling Caribbean authors, many of whom are based in Canada. The non-profit company became a registered Canadian charity in 2014.

In 2006, Solomon founded the CaribbeanTales International Film Festival in Toronto as a platform for Caribbean and Caribbean diaspora films and filmmakers from the region. The CaribbeanTales Youth Film Festival, during Black History Month in Toronto, screens Africentric films in schools and communities. The Film Festival Group has also produced festivals and events in Barbados and New York.

=== CaribbeanTales Worldwide Distribution ===
While teaching film at The University of the West Indies in 2009, she consolidated her connections in the region. This led to the creation of CaribbeanTales Worldwide Distribution, a Barbados-based company, and the first film distribution company dedicated to international distribution of Caribbean-themed audio visual content. The company was co-founded with cultural industries specialist Dr. Keith Nurse, businessman Terrence Farrell, and filmmakers Lisa Wickham and Mary Wells, with the goal to tackle head-on problems of the monetisation of Caribbean-themed content and the development of the Caribbean Film Industry.

=== Creators of Colour Incubator ===
The Creators of Colour Incubator (formerly CaribbeanTales Incubator Program), also founded in 2010, an annual program that takes place during the Toronto International Film Festival, aims to train filmmakers in the creation and marketing of sustainable content, and has been committed to helping to develop an infrastructure and international profile for Caribbean films, in the region and the diaspora. The Program has evolved into a development and production hub for regional content. In 2015, CaribbeanTales won a five-year sponsorship and production deal with Flow, the brand name for Cable and Wireless Ltd, the largest telecommunications conglomerate in the Caribbean. The deal, brokered with Flow C.E.O John Reid, supports the production of at least three television series pilots a year from the CaribbeanTales Incubator Program. In 2016, the first of these projects were selected: Caribbean Girl NYC by Mariette Monpierre, Battledream Chronicle by Alain Bidard, and Heat by Menelik Shabazz. Production is underway in New York, Martinique and Barbados respectively. In 2017 Flow and CaribbeanTales expanded their relationship to give Flow subscribers around the Caribbean access to CaribbeanTales vast catalogue of films through Television on demand.

=== CaribbeanTales-TV ===
CaribbeanTales established an online VOD platform CaribbeanTales-TV.

== Works ==
=== Selected radio drama ===
Year	Radio Play	Credit/Role	Notes
1990	Nadir by Parv Bancil	Director / Producer	
1990	Monsoon by Maya Chowdhry	Director / Producer	Winner— Sony Radio Awards, Best Original Screenplay
1989	The Adoption Papers by Jackie Kay	Director / Producer	
1989	Asha by Tanika Gupta	Director / Producer	
1989	I Is A Long Memoried Woman by Grace Nicholls	Director / Producer	Winner— Sony Radio Awards, Best Feature; Winner - Prix Futura, Best Documentary Feature
1991	Her Father's Daughter by Winsome Pinnock	Director / Producer	
1989	Afrogoth by Peter Kalu	Director / Producer	
1989	Parker's Mood by Alex Ward	Director / Producer	

=== Film and television ===
Year	Film/T.V. Project	Type of Program/Funder	Credit/Role	Awards
1990	I Is A Long Memoried Woman	Documentary Feature - Arts Council of Great Britain/Britannia Entertainment	Writer / Director / Producer	Gold Award - Television Performing Arts - New York International Film and TV Festival; Best Feature - Sony Awards; Prix Futura - Best Documentary Feature
1992	Reunion	Documentary - BBC 2	Writer / Director / Producer	Prized Pieces Award - National Black Programming Consortium, US
1994	What My Mother Told Me	Feature Film - Channel 4 Television	Writer / Director / Producer	Producer's Award - Women of The Sun, US; Best Film Portraying the Black Experience - Berlin Black Film Festival
1994	Siren Spirits	Short Film Series - British Film Institute	Writer / Director / Producer	
1995	Flight	Television Drama - BBC Drama	Executive Producer	
1995	Bideshi	Short Film - BBC Drama	Director	Best Short Film - Bombay Film Festival
1997	Love Is the Devil: Study for a Portrait of Francis Bacon	Feature Film - BBC Films / The British Film Institute	Executive Producer	
1997	Sixth Happiness	Feature Film - BBC Films / The British Film Institute	Executive Producer	
1998	Peggy Su!	Feature Film - BBC Films	Director	BAFTA Award for Best Costume Design (for Joey Attawia); Royal Television Society Award for Best Costume Design
1998	Speak like a Child	Feature Film - BBC Films / British Film Institute	Executive Producer	
2001-2003	Lord Have Mercy!	One / Aboriginal People's Television Network	Co-Creator/Producer/Director	Nominated—Best Comedy Series (shared with Vanz Chapman and Claire Prieto); Gemini - nomination, Best Comedy Series (with Claire Prieto, Vanz Chapman); Gemini - nomination, Best Actress for Leonie Forbes
2006	LiteratureAlive	Documentary Series - Bravo	Creator/Producer/Director(selected episodes)	
2008	A Winter Tale	Feature Film - City TV/Telefilm Canada	Writer/Director	Best Canadian Feature - ReelWorld Film Festival; Audience Award, Best Feature - 'Trinidad & Tobago Film Festival; Best Foreign Film - San Diego Black Film Festival; Ousmane Sembène Award for Best Foreign Film - Lagos Film Festival; Diaspora Award - Fespaco
2008	HeartBeat	Documentary Series - Bravo	Creator/Producer/Director (selected Episodes)	Best Canadian Feature
2013	Kingston Paradise	Feature Film - CPTC / CaribbeanTalesFlix / Caribbean Creativity	Producer/Executive Producer (with Mary Wells)	Audience Award—CaribbeanTales International Film Festival; Programmer's Award - Pan African Film and Arts Festival; Best International Film - Africa Movie Awards
2019	HERO	Feature Film	Writer/Director/Producer / Republic Bank / Telefilm / CaribbeanTales / Imagine Media International	Audience Award—Trinidad & Tobago Film Festival; Janet Dubois Award Best Narrative Feature - Pan African Film and Arts Festival; Best Diaspora Feature - Africa Movie Academy Awards

=== Community awards ===
Year	Organisation	Award	Notes
2017	100 ABC Awards	100 Accomplished Black Women 2016	
2015	Consulate General for the Republic of Trinidad and Tobago in Toronto	For "Outstanding Contributions to Caribbean Film and Television"	
2015	Jackie Robinson Fortitude Awards	2015 Persistence Award	
2014	Planet Africa Television	2014 Heritage Award	
2012	Tropicana Community Centre	2012 Community Builder Award	
