= CaribbeanTales International Film Festival =

The CaribbeanTales International Film Festival is an annual film festival, staged in Toronto, Ontario. The festival programs a lineup of films from Caribbean countries, as well as films from the Caribbean diaspora in Canada.

The festival was launched in 2006 by filmmaker Frances-Anne Solomon, through her CaribbeanTales Media Group production firm. In 2009, the festival also launched a separate sister event for youth films, staged during Black History Month. In 2013, it launched CaribbeanTales TV, a video on demand streaming service dedicated to Caribbean films.

The event is normally staged at Toronto's Royal Cinema. Due to the COVID-19 pandemic in Canada, the 2020 festival was staged online through CaribbeanTales TV.

The festival also sponsors an incubator program to fund film projects by emerging filmmakers within the Caribbean diaspora.
