= Caribbean International Network =

Television channel based in Jamaica

Caribbean International Network, also known as CIN TV, is an internationally broadcast English language television channel headquartered in Jamaica. The main focus of the channel is Caribbean culture, news, sports, lifestyle, opinions, and entertainment. Co-founder Stephen Hill is CEO of the network.

Since 2007, CIN has broadcast to the sizable Caribbean diaspora In New York, where it is available on Channel 73 (WNYC-TV), and on Verizon Fios Channel 26. According to the network, it has a viewership of 550,000 when it is on air.

Popular past programs have included Caribbean Lifestyle Magazine, which featured celebrities and entrepreneurs living in the United States.

CIN sponsors an annual lecture series in New York City bringing guest speakers from Jamaica.
