= Saint Peter's Peacocks men's basketball statistical leaders =

The Saint Peter's Peacocks men's basketball statistical leaders are individual statistical leaders of the Saint Peter's Peacocks men's basketball program in various categories, including points, assists, blocks, rebounds, and steals. Within those areas, the lists identify single-game, single-season, and career leaders. The Peacocks represent Saint Peter's University in the NCAA's Metro Atlantic Athletic Conference.

Saint Peter's began competing in intercollegiate basketball in 1930. However, the school's record book does not generally list records from before the 1950s, as records from before this period are often incomplete and inconsistent. Since scoring was much lower in this era, and teams played much fewer games during a typical season, it is likely that few or no players from this era would appear on these lists anyway.

The NCAA did not officially record assists as a stat until the 1983–84 season, and blocks and steals until the 1985–86 season, but Saint Peter's record books includes players in these stats before these seasons. These lists are updated through the end of the 2021–22 season.

== Scoring ==
Career
Rk	Player	Points	Seasons
1	Keydren Clark	3058	2002–03 2003–04 2004–05 2005–06
2	Ricky Bellinger	1743	1996–97 1997–98 1998–99 1999–00
3	Willie Haynes	1730	1985–86 1986–87 1987–88 1988–89
4	Shelton Gibbs	1688	1981–82 1982–83 1983–84 1984–85
5	Bill Smith	1612	1958–59 1959–60 1960–61
6	Bob Fazio	1590	1974–75 1975–76 1976–77
7	Wesley Jenkins	1557	2007–08 2008–09 2009–10 2010–11
8	Rich Rinaldi	1545	1968–69 1969–70 1970–71
9	Nick Leon	1466	2007–08 2008–09 2009–10 2010–11
10	Ken Slappy	1430	1973–74 1974–75 1975–76 1976–77

Season
Rk	Player	Points	Season
1	Keydren Clark	840	2005–06
2	Keydren Clark	775	2003–04
3	Keydren Clark	722	2002–03
4	Keydren Clark	721	2004–05
5	Elnardo Webster	700	1967–68
6	Rich Rinaldi	687	1970–71
7	Bob Fazio	656	1975–76
8	Elnardo Webster	638	1968–69
9	Ted Martiniuk	611	1971–72
10	Tony Walker	596	1990–91

Single game
Rk	Player	Points	Season	Opponent
1	Rich Rinaldi	54	1970–71	St. Francis, NY
2	Tom Schwester	53	1969–70	Manhattan
3	Elnardo Webster	51	1967–68	Marshall
4	Keydren Clark	48	2002–03	Northern Ariz
5	Keydren Clark	44	2003–04	St. Francis, NY

== Rebounds ==
Career
Rk	Player	Rebounds	Seasons
1	Pete O'Dea	1053	1965–66 1966–67 1967–68
2	Todd Sowell	976	2004–05 2005–06 2006–07 2007–08
3	Quadir Welton	884	2013–14 2014–15 2015–16 2016–17
4	Ryan Bacon	819	2007–08 2008–09 2009–10 2010–11
5	Elnardo Webster	769	1967–68 1968–69
6	Bob Fazio	727	1974–75 1975–76 1976–77
7	Luis Arrosa	687	1992–93 1993–94 1994–95 1995–96
8	Chuck Veterano	678	1987–88 1988–89 1989–90 1991–92
9	KC Ndefo	671	2018–19 2019–20 2020–21 2021–22
10	Darius Conley	662	2009–10 2010–11 2011–12 2012–13

Season
Rk	Player	Rebounds	Season
1	Pete O'Dea	409	1967–68
2	Elnardo Webster	389	1968–69
3	Elnardo Webster	380	1967–68
4	Pete O'Dea	350	1966–67
5	Todd Sowell	326	2005–06
6	Todd Sowell	312	2007–08
7	Quadir Welton	300	2016–17
8	Pete O'Dea	294	1965–66
9	Juan Jiminez	281	1972–73
10	Bob Fazio	277	1974–75

Single game
Rk	Player	Rebounds	Season	Opponent
1	Juan Jiminez	28	1969–70	Upsala
2	Pete O'Dea	26	1966–67	Siena
3	Bob Fazio	25	1974–75	Loyola, MD

== Assists ==
Career
Rk	Player	Assists	Seasons
1	Jasper Walker	674	1987–88 1988–89 1989–90 1990–91
2	Keydren Clark	501	2002–03 2003–04 2004–05 2005–06
	Trevis Wyche	501	2013–14 2014–15 2015–16 2016–17
4	Ken Slappy	404	1973–74 1974–75 1975–76 1976–77
5	Antoine Allen	382	1989–90 1990–91 1991–92 1992–93 1993–94
6	Phil Jamison	377	1980–81 1981–82 1982–83 1983–84
7	Nick Leon	332	2007–08 2008–09 2009–10 2010–11
8	Moe Segar	331	1993–94 1994–95 1995–96 1996–97
9	Ted Martiniuk	308	1969–70 1970–71 1971–72
10	Tony Holm	288	1968–69 1969–70 1971–72

Season
Rk	Player	Assists	Season
1	Jasper Walker	204	1988–89
2	Kevin Boyle	177	1985–86
3	Ken Slappy	175	1976–77
4	Jasper Walker	170	1989–90
5	Jasper Walker	162	1990–91
6	Tony Holm	148	1971–72
7	Latrell Reid	147	2023–24
8	Keydren Clark	140	2005–06
	Tony Holm	140	1969–70
10	Jasper Walker	138	1987–88

Single game
Rk	Player	Assists	Season	Opponent
1	Jasper Walker	20	1989–90	Holy Cross

== Steals ==
Career
Rk	Player	Steals	Seasons
1	Keydren Clark	265	2002–03 2003–04 2004–05 2005–06
2	Moe Segar	230	1993–94 1994–95 1995–96 1996–97
3	Jasper Walker	195	1987–88 1988–89 1989–90 1990–91
4	Phil Jamison	181	1980–81 1981–82 1982–83 1983–84
5	Cliff Anderson	175	1975–76 1976–77 1977–78 1979–80
6	Wesley Jenkins	172	2007–08 2008–09 2009–10 2010–11
7	Trevis Wyche	168	2013–14 2014–15 2015–16 2016–17
8	Ricky Bellinger	155	1996–97 1997–98 1998–99 1999–00
9	Antoine Allen	154	1989–90 1990–91 1991–92 1992–93 1993–94
10	KC Ndefo	145	2018–19 2019–20 2020–21 2021–22

Season
Rk	Player	Steals	Season
1	Keydren Clark	93	2004–05
2	Moe Segar	87	1996–97
3	Keydren Clark	80	2005–06
4	Jasper Walker	78	1990–91
5	Cliff Anderson	72	1979–80
6	William Brown	60	1981–82
7	Brent Bland	59	2025–26
	Nate Brown	59	2001–02
	Ricky Bellinger	59	1998–99
10	Chazz Patterson	58	2016–17

Single game
Rk	Player	Steals	Season	Opponent
1	Moe Segar	8	1996–97	Niagara
	Keydren Clark	8	2005–06	Seton Hall
	Latrell Reid	8	2023–24	UMBC

== Blocks ==
Career
Rk	Player	Blocks	Seasons
1	KC Ndefo	310	2018–19 2019–20 2020–21 2021–22
2	Ryan Bacon	209	2007–08 2008–09 2009–10 2010–11
3	Todd Sowell	198	2004–05 2005–06 2006–07 2007–08
4	Quadir Welton	136	2013–14 2014–15 2015–16 2016–17
5	Samuel Idowu	125	2015–16 2016–17 2017–18 2018–19
6	Darius Conley	114	2009–10 2010–11 2011–12 2012–13
7	Moe Segar	97	1993–94 1994–95 1995–96 1996–97
	Marvin Andrews	97	1987–88 1988–89 1989–90 1990–91
	Daren Rowe	97	1983–84 1984–85 1985–86 1986–87
10	Jim Brandon	92	1978–79 1979–80

Season
Rk	Player	Blocks	Season
1	KC Ndefo	96	2021–22
2	KC Ndefo	91	2020–21
3	Ryan Bacon	73	2008–09
4	Todd Sowell	67	2007–08
	KC Ndefo	67	2019–20
6	Ryan Bacon	65	2010–11
7	Samuel Idowu	59	2018–19
8	Todd Sowell	57	2005–06
9	KC Ndefo	56	2018–19
10	Todd Sowell	55	2006–07

Single game
Rk	Player	Blocks	Season	Opponent
1	KC Ndefo	11	2021–22	Quinnipiac
2	Todd Sowell	7	2005–06	Canisus
	KC Ndefo	7	2020–21	Siena
