= American Morning =

Former CNN Program

- American Morning (with Kiran Chetry and John Roberts) on CNN HD
- Starring: Ali Velshi; Christine Romans; Carol Costello
- Country of origin: United States
- Original language: English
- No. of episodes: 2,688

Production
- Producer: Jim McGinnis
- Running time: 180 minutes

Original release
- Network: CNN
- Release: September 12, 2001 – December 30, 2011

American Morning is an American morning television news program that aired on CNN from September 12, 2001, to December 30, 2011. American Morning debuted with anchors Paula Zahn and Anderson Cooper on the day after the September 11 attacks, five months earlier than planned, replacing CNN Early Edition, CNN Live This Morning, and CNN Money Morning.

Cooper was replaced by Bill Hemmer in February 2002. The show's next permanent co-anchors were Soledad O'Brien and Miles O'Brien, who fronted the show from 2003 to 2007. They were replaced by John Roberts and Kiran Chetry due to poor ratings. After Roberts and Chetry left in 2011, the show did not have a permanent anchor team and was shelved by CNN at the end of the year. American Morning was replaced by two new programs, Early Start and Starting Point.

== About the show ==
American Morning was last hosted by Ali Velshi, Christine Romans and Carol Costello. Others who appeared regularly were Rob Marciano with the weather, Sunny Hostin on legal news, and CNN senior medical correspondent Dr. Sanjay Gupta as well as Elizabeth Cohen with health-related reports.

American Morning maintained a stronger focus on political, domestic and global stories than many U.S. morning shows, as demonstrated by its slogan "the most news in the morning," although it did have segments related to celebrities and entertainment news. There are usually more scripted segments on American Morning than on other morning shows. The program mainly aimed to attract viewers who prefer a more straightforward morning show, without the amount of anchor banter found on the competition. Its main competitors were Fox News' Fox & Friends and MSNBC's Morning Joe.

American Morning aired live every weekday from 6 to 9 am EST. After years of operating from a streetside studio at the 1271 Avenue of the Americas in New York City, the show moved north to an indoor set at the CNN studios in the Time Warner Center at Columbus Circle which was shared with the HLN show Showbiz Tonight. In October 2006, AM received a redesigned set, along with new music and graphics.

On September 26, 2007, American Morning began broadcasting in high-definition television.

Originally AM aired from 7 am to 10 am. After the cancellation of CNN Daybreak in November 2005, the program was expanded to four hours, 6 am to 10 am. However, the air time was reduced in October 2006 to 6 am to 9 am, after the expansion of CNN Newsroom.

== History ==
=== 2001–2009 ===
American Morning originally premiered on September 12, 2001. Paula Zahn began anchoring the program five months early due to the 9/11 attacks which had occurred the previous morning. Jack Cafferty and Anderson Cooper joined her as news anchors and helped deliver news on the attacks.

In February 2002, Bill Hemmer moved to New York to become news anchor Paula Zahn anchored the program solo with no replacement for Anderson Cooper. In April 2003, Bill Hemmer anchored the program solo when Paula Zahn moved to CNN primetime. Heidi Collins and Daryn Kagan temporarily hosted with Bill Hemmer before Soledad O'Brien debuted as co-host.

In January 2002, CNN executives were embarrassed to find out an on-air promotion that was not approved by top executives was being aired that called Paula Zahn "sexy" and included the sound of a zipper. CNN said that the advertisement was approved by a woman in the productions department. CNN later apologized to Paula Zahn.

In June 2005, Bill Hemmer left CNN and was replaced by Miles O'Brien. Heidi Collins was replaced by Carol Costello. Jack Cafferty left the show later that summer. The show moved to the Time Warner Center, and shared a set with the CNN Headline News program Showbiz Tonight. Costello later left the program and was not replaced; she returned in 2011. In October 2006, the show received a redesigned set, along with new music and graphics.

Due to disappointing Nielsen ratings, CNN announced the replacement of Miles O'Brien and Soledad O'Brien with Kiran Chetry and John Roberts as program hosts effective April 16, 2007. In the first quarter of 2007, Fox and Friends on Fox News Channel averaged 769,000 viewers, CNN's American Morning averaged 372,000 and MSNBC's Imus in the Morning averaged 361,000 viewers at the time of its cancellation by MSNBC on April 11, 2007.

=== 2010–2011 ===
On November 22, 2010, American Morning underwent a lighter graphics change.

2011 saw the departures of Roberts and Chetry. Ali Velshi initially filled in alongside Chetry before the latter's departure in July. Chetry was replaced by Christine Romans and Carol Costello.

In October 2011, CNN announced a revamp of its morning lineup to be more competitive against cable entries Fox & Friends on Fox News and Morning Joe on MSNBC. American Morning would be replaced by two new programs from January 2, 2012, Early Start (5-7 a.m.) and Starting Point (7-9 a.m.) (both times ET). The shows are expected to be less politically focused and cover a broad range of news.

The final broadcast of American Morning on December 30, 2011, was anchored by Alina Cho and Deborah Feyerick. Cho and Feyerick brought show staff onto the set, thanking them for their efforts.

== Previous hosts ==
- Anderson Cooper (2001-2002)
- Paula Zahn (2001–2003)
- Daryn Kagan (2002–2003)
- Jack Cafferty (2002–2005)
- Bill Hemmer (2002–2005)
- Andy Serwer (2003)
- Heidi Collins (2003–2005)
- Soledad O'Brien (2003–2007)
- Carol Costello (2005–2006, 2011)
- Miles O'Brien (2005–2007)
- John Roberts (2007–2010)
- Kiran Chetry (2007–2011)
- Ali Velshi (2010–2011)
- Christine Romans (2010–2011)
- Alina Cho (2011)
- Deborah Feyerick (2011)

== See also ==
- Today (American TV program)
- Good Morning America
