= James Loughran (disambiguation) =

James Loughran is a Scottish conductor.

James Loughran or Jimmy Loughran may also refer to:

- James N. Loughran, Jesuit academic
- James Loughran (doctor), Irish general practitioner
- Jimmy Loughran, English footballer
