= Loughran =

Loughran is a surname which may refer to:

- Angus Loughran (born 1966), British sports commentator and pundit
- Beatrix Loughran (1900–1975), American figure skater
- Bill Loughran (1862–1917), American baseball player
- Cara Loughran (2003–2018), one of the 17 victims who was killed in the Stoneman Douglas High School shooting
- Eamonn Loughran (born 1970), Northern Irish boxer
- Frank Loughran (1931–2008), Australian footballer
- Harry Loughran (born 1990s), Irish Gaelic footballer
- James Loughran (1931–2024), British conductor
- James N. Loughran (1940–2006), American Jesuit
- Jimmy Loughran (1897–1970), English footballer
- Joe Loughran (1915–1994), English footballer
- John T. Loughran (1889–1953), American lawyer and politician
- Jonathan Loughran (born 1966), American actor
- Marco Loughran (born 1989), British swimmer
- Matt Loughran, American guitarist
- Nate Loughran, American mixed martial artist
- Paul Loughran (born 1969), Northern Irish actor
- Peter Loughran (born 1940), Australian rules footballer
- PJ Loughran (born 1973), American illustrator, musician and entrepreneur
- Thomas P. Loughran Jr., American physician scientist
- Tommy Loughran (1902–1982), American professional boxer
