= Timothy Law Snyder =

American educator and mathematician

Timothy Snyder
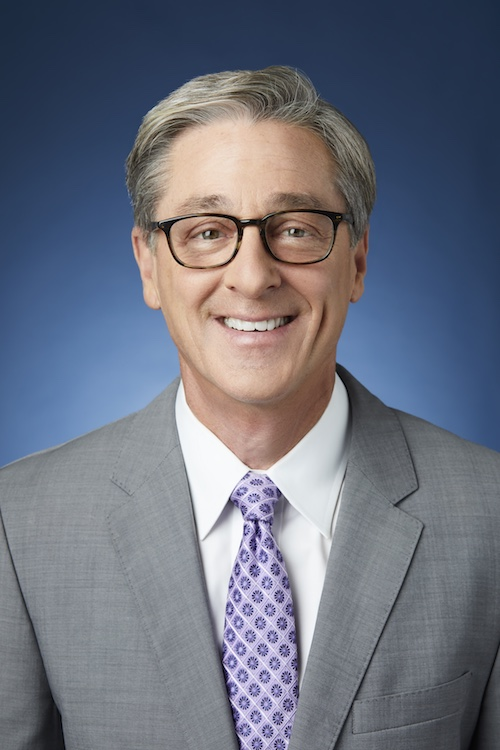
- Snyder in 2021

16th President of Loyola Marymount University
- In office June 1, 2015 – May 31, 2025
- Preceded by: David W. Burcham
- Succeeded by: Thomas Poon

Personal details
- Born: Timothy Law Snyder; 1959 (age 66–67) Toledo, Ohio, U.S.
- Spouse: Carol Costello (m. 2004)
- Education: University of Toledo (BA, BS, MS); Princeton University (MA, PhD)
- Scientific career
- Fields: Mathematics
- Workplaces: Princeton University; Georgetown University; Fairfield University; Loyola University Maryland; Loyola Marymount University
- Thesis: Asymptotic Worst Case Lengths in Some Problems from Classical Computational Geometry and Combinatorial Optimization (1987)
- Doctoral advisor: J. Michael Steele

Timothy Law Snyder (born 1959) is an American academic. He served as the 16th president of Loyola Marymount University in Los Angeles, California from 2015 to 2025.

== Early life and education ==
Timothy Law Snyder was born in Ohio. He graduated from the University of Toledo, where he earned bachelor's degrees in psychology and mathematics in 1981, followed by a M.S. in mathematics in 1983. He then earned a M.A. in 1985 and a Ph.D. in 1987 in applied and computational mathematics from Princeton University, under the supervision of J. Michael Steele.

== Career ==
Snyder's higher education career began as a graduate student and teacher at the University of Toledo in the department of mathematics from 1981 to 1983. From 1984 to 1987, Snyder taught in the program in statistics and operations research at Princeton University, then he taught in the department of civil engineering during the 1986–1987 school year.

Snyder began teaching at Georgetown University in Washington, D.C., in 1987 as an assistant professor of computer science. He served as adjunct associate dean for science education in the college of arts and sciences from 1993 to 1995. He was chair of Georgetown’s department of computer science from 1994 to 1995, and from 1995 to 1999 he was the first dean of science at Georgetown University. Snyder was the Wright Family Distinguished Professor in the department of computer science from 1997 to 2001. His mathematical research has concerned problems in computational geometry, including Steiner trees, convex hulls, and worst-case analysis of total length and individual lengths geometric graphs.

He was a visiting professor at the Wharton School of the University of Pennsylvania, in the summer of 1991 and 1992.

From 2001 to 2007, Snyder served as the dean of the college of arts and sciences at Fairfield University in Fairfield, Connecticut. He was professor of mathematics and vice president for academic affairs at Loyola University Maryland from 2007 to 2014. In 2011, Snyder investigated allegations that Professor Thomas DiLorenzo was a member of the League of the South, a neo-Confederate organization.

Snyder has practiced “technogogy” for more than 20 years and created LCAST, a series of podcasts aimed at helping students. The podcasts also feature original music he has written, arranged, recorded, produced, and mixed.

Snyder was chosen to replace David W. Burcham as the president of Loyola Marymount University in March 2015. He assumed office as LMU's president on June 1, 2015, and was inaugurated on October 6, 2015. Snyder resigned from the position effective May 31, 2025.

== Personal life ==
Snyder was born in 1959 to Shirley and Gordon Snyder in Toledo, Ohio. He attended local public schools, including Rogers High School. Snyder is a convert to Catholicism. He has an older sister, Linda Snyder, and a younger brother, Scott Snyder.

He has been a musician most of his life, and was the lead singer in the touring rock and punk band Whirlwind from 1976 to 1983.

Snyder is married to CNN journalist Carol Costello. They met when she interviewed him for a story on the odds of winning the Powerball lottery. They married in 2004.
