= 1990–91 Saint Peter's Peacocks men's basketball team =

American college basketball season

1990–91 Saint Peter's Peacocks men's basketball
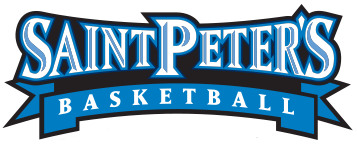

MAAC tournament champions

NCAA tournament, first round
- Conference: Metro Atlantic Athletic Conference
- Record: 24–7 (11–5 MAAC)
- Head coach: Ted Fiore
- Home arena: Yanitelli Center

1990–91 MAAC men's basketball standings
	Conf.				Overall
Team	W		L	PCT	W		L	PCT
Siena	12	–	4	.750	25	–	10	.714
La Salle	12	–	4	.750	19	–	10	.655
Saint Peter's †	11	–	5	.688	24	–	7	.774
Iona	11	–	5	.688	17	–	13	.567
Manhattan	8	–	8	.500	13	–	15	.464
Niagara	6	–	10	.375	8	–	20	.286
Loyola (MD)	5	–	11	.313	12	–	16	.429
Fairfield	4	–	12	.250	8	–	20	.286
Canisius	3	–	13	.188	10	–	19	.345
† 1991 MAAC tournament winner Rankings from AP Poll

The 1990–91 Saint Peter's Peacocks men's basketball team represented Saint Peter's College during the 1990–91 NCAA Division I men's basketball season. The Peacocks, led by fifth-year head coach Ted Fiore, played their home games at the Yanitelli Center and were members of the Metro Atlantic Athletic Conference. They finished the season 24–7, 11–5 in MAAC play to finish in third place. They defeated Niagara, La Salle, and Iona to win the MAAC tournament. As a result, they received the conference's automatic bid to the NCAA tournament – the first in school history – as the No. 12 seed in the Midwest region where they lost to Texas in the first round.

== Roster ==
1990–91 Saint Peter's Peacocks men's basketball team
Players	Coaches
Pos. / # / Name / Height / Weight / Year / Previous school / Hometown; F / / Tony Walker / 6 ft 7 in (2.01 m) / —	Head coach: Ted Fiore; Assistant coach(es) Legend: (C) Team captain; (S) Suspended; (I) Ineligible; (W) Walk-on; Injured; Current redshirt

== Schedule and results ==
Date time, TV	Rank^{#}	Opponent^{#}	Result	Record	Site (attendance) city, state
Regular season
Feb 26, 1991*		La Salle	W 85–53	21–6 (11–5)	Yanitelli Center; Jersey City, New Jersey
MAAC tournament
Mar 2, 1991*		vs. Niagara; Quarterfinal	W 81–59	22–6	Knickerbocker Arena; Albany, New York
Mar 3, 1991*		vs. La Salle; Semifinal	W 57–50	23–6	Knickerbocker Arena; Albany, New York
Mar 4, 1991*		vs. Iona; Championship Game	W 64–58	24–6	Knickerbocker Arena; Albany, New York
NCAA tournament
Mar 15, 1991*	(12 MW)	vs. (5 MW) No. 23 Texas	L 65–73	24–7	University of Dayton Arena; Dayton, Ohio
*Non-conference game. ^{#}Rankings from AP Poll. (#) Tournament seedings in parentheses. MW=Midwest. All times are in Eastern Time.
