= Heidi Collins =

American journalist

- Born: Heidi Elmquist; June 1, 1967 (age 59); Minnesota
- Education: University of Maryland
- Occupation: News anchor
- Spouse: Matt Collins (m. 1992)
- Children: 2

Heidi Collins (born Heidi Elmquist; June 1, 1967) is an American correspondent and news anchor for KMSP-TV Fox 9 News in Minneapolis – Saint Paul prior to her departure on July 29, 2013. She formerly worked for CNN.

== Life and career ==
Collins was born in Minnesota. She graduated from Mounds View High School in Arden Hills and went on to earn a B.S. in Journalism at the University of Maryland.

Collins began her career at KFDX-TV in Wichita Falls, Texas. She was later an anchor for KKTV in Colorado Springs and KUSA in Denver, Colorado. She joined CNN in 2002, originally anchoring on CNN Headline News. Eventually, she moved up to American Morning, the network's morning news program, where she served as news reader and substitute co-anchor. She was replaced on American Morning by Carol Costello and became a correspondent/fill-in anchor for Anderson Cooper 360° until September 2006.

On Veteran's Day in 2008, Collins interviewed President George W. Bush live on the deck of the decommissioned USS Intrepid, an event she calls the highlight of her career.

In early 2010, CNN decided not to renew Collins contract. On January 15, 2010, while reporting on the earthquake in Haiti, Sanjay Gupta (CNN's chief medical correspondent) wished Heidi farewell, mentioning that it was her last day. She acknowledged that she was leaving CNN.

On September 28, 2010, it was announced that Collins would be joining the Minneapolis-Saint Paul station KMSP-TV Channel 9 News at 5 and 9 PM as an anchor, replacing the retiring Robyne Robinson. Her first broadcast was on Wednesday, October 13, 2010.

Collins interviewed newly re-elected Minnesota Secretary of State Mark Ritchie on November 3, 2010, interrupting him several times, one time saying "I ask, you answer - Yes?" The combative tone of the interview generated widespread criticism of Collins, with Kevin Hoffman of City Pages calling it "insanely hostile, " leaving "some viewers questioning her judgment and fairness."

Collins last day on KMSP-TV was on July 29, 2013. Her prepared statement in confirming the departure only indicated that she was going to pursue future opportunities in both television and global business. A local newspaper columnist attempted to contact Collins a number of times to discuss Collins departure from KMSP; however, those attempts were unsuccessful.

== Awards and recognition ==
Collins has received three Edward R. Murrow awards as well as an Associated Press Award in the best documentary category. She was deemed the Most Distinguished Graduate by Mounds View High School.

== Personal life ==
In 1992, she married Matt Collins, a former Air Force fighter pilot. They live in Minnesota with their two sons. Collins enjoys reality television and naps. Collins and one of her sons are among the 1% of the American population diagnosed with Celiac Disease. She reported on the disease on CNN in November 2006 and was the official spokesperson for the National Foundation for Celiac Awareness.

Collins has sought to raise public awareness of Celiac (Coeliac) disease. Having recovered from this disease after suffering a miscarriage, Collins has sought to increase public understanding. This disease manifests itself in a severe reaction to gluten, a substance found in most grain-based products and bread. In 2006, Collins became an "official spokesperson" for the National Foundation for Celiac Awareness (NFCA), now called Beyond Celiac. Due to her increased risk of miscarriage caused by the disease, Collins and her husband elected to use a surrogate mother to carry and deliver their second son.

== See also ==
- List of people diagnosed with coeliac disease
