= CNN Daybreak =

- Starring: Carol Costello
- Country of origin: United States
- Original language: English

Production
- Running time: 60 minutes

Original release
- Network: CNN
- Release: June 1, 1980 – November 25, 2005

CNN Daybreak is an American early morning newscast aired on CNN, last anchored from New York by Carol Costello. It debuted on June 1, 1980, the same day CNN went live.

== History ==
The first program to air live weekdays on the network, it preceded American Morning at 5:00 a.m. ET. Similar to First Look on MSNBC, the program was based on covering the news stories of the morning without talk and analysis, usually with correspondents on location or taped stories from the previous evening.

In the early 1990s, CNN Daybreak ran as a 3-hour show with two different pairs of anchors. While Rick Moore and Molly McCoy presented the 6am and 8am hours, Bob Cain in Atlanta and Norma Quarles in New York hosted the 7am hour.

For a short period in September 2001, the 6 am hour of CNN Daybreak was replaced by CNN Money Morning, which itself was cancelled after two episodes due to the September 11 attacks.

Until spring 2005, Daybreak was aired from the CNN Center in Atlanta. Costello then moved to New York following her marriage. The show moved to the Time Warner Center shortly after.

=== Cancellation ===
In October 2005, as a cost-cutting measure, the program was canceled. The last official broadcast was on November 25, 2005. Carol Costello graciously bid her crew farewell, thanking them, and telling viewers how much they were missed. Costello subsequently was an anchor on HLN until 2018, based in Los Angeles.

The timeslot was occupied by a rerun of Anderson Cooper 360, with the 6am hour being replaced by an expansion of American Morning. The Anderson Cooper 360 rerun was usually replaced with an early live edition of American Morning if there is breaking news. It was then replaced by American Morning Wake-Up Call until the cancellation of American Morning. Both hours are now occupied by CNN This Morning with Kasie Hunt, formerly Early Start.
