= Robert B. Lawton =

American Jesuit, President of Loyola Marymount University

The Reverend Robert B. Lawton SJ

14th President of Loyola Marymount University
- In office 1999 – May 31, 2010
- Preceded by: Thomas P. O'Malley
- Succeeded by: David W. Burcham

Personal details
- Born: May 3, 1947 (age 79) Cumberland, Maryland
- Education: Fordham University; Harvard University
- Profession: Jesuit priest, professor, administrator

Robert B. Lawton SJ (born May 3, 1947) is an American Jesuit and the 14th President of Loyola Marymount University in Los Angeles, California. He also holds tenured professorships in both the Classics and Archaeology Department and the Theological Studies Department of LMU.

A Phi Beta Kappa graduate of Fordham University (summa cum laude) with a major in classics in 1971, he went on to earn his Ph.D. in Near Eastern Languages and Civilizations from Harvard University in 1977, where he was a Danforth and a Woodrow Wilson Fellow. He was ordained a Roman Catholic priest on June 13, 1981.

Lawton taught Hebrew and Aramaic at the Pontifical Biblical Institute in Rome from 1982 to 1984. He also served as the Dean of Georgetown College, the liberal arts and sciences college of Georgetown University.

== Loyola Marymount University ==
Lawton became the 14th President of Loyola Marymount University in 1999, succeeding Thomas P. O'Malley, S.J. New buildings and facilities were added to Loyola Marymount's campus during Lawton's eleven-year presidency, including University Hall and the William H. Hannon Library. Lawton also oversaw the drafting of Loyola Marymount's 20 year "Master Plan."

On March 1, 2010, Father Lawton announced his retirement from the presidency of Loyola Marymount University, effective at the conclusion of the academic year in May 2010. He also announced an immediate medical leave from the university.

Lawton cited two main reasons for his decision to retire as head of the university. In an email to LMU faculty, students and staff, he noted that a long recovery from back surgery in 2009 had "affected my ability, because of my schedule, to do the physical activity and exercise advised and, more importantly, to do my job to the fullest."

He also cited the so-called "rule of ten" as a second factor in his decision to retire saying, "Ten years in these kinds of jobs is usually enough and after that both the institution and the person benefit from change. At least that is true of me."

Lawton said that he had originally hoped to remain president of Loyola Marymount until the school's centennial celebration concluded in May 2012, but health problems, including his back surgery had become an obstacle to administration. He will take an immediate sabbatical following his retirement to concentrate of his health.

The chairman of the Loyola Marymount Board of Trustees, R. Chad Dreier, announced that Executive Vice President and Provost David W. Burcham, the former dean of LMU's Loyola Law School, was appointed the university's acting president while Father Lawton was on medical leave and would become interim president when Father Lawton's retirement took effect on May 31, 2010. On October 4, 2010, The Board of Trustees of Loyola Marymount University unanimously elected Burcham as the 15th President of Loyola Marymount University.

== See also ==
- Presidents of Loyola Marymount University

Academic offices
Preceded by Thomas P. O'Malley	14th President of Loyola Marymount University; 1999—2010	Succeeded by David W. Burcham
Preceded by Royden B. Davis	Dean of Georgetown College; 1989—1999	Succeeded by Jane Dammen McAuliffe
