= Kiran Chetry =

Nepalese-American television broadcast journalist

- किरण क्षेत्री
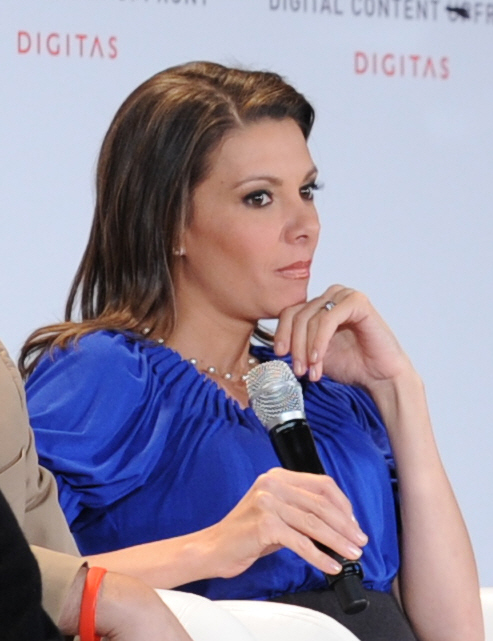
- Chetry in 2010
- Born: Kiran Carrie Chetry; August 26, 1974 (age 52); Patan, Bagmati, Nepal
- Other name: Kiran Kshetri
- Education: University of Maryland, College Park
- Spouse: Chris Knowles (div. 2013)
- Children: 2

Kiran Carrie Chetry (Nepali: किरण क्षेत्री, pronounced [kiɾʌɳ t͡sʰet̪ri], born August 26, 1974) is a Nepalese American former television broadcast journalist who, until 2011, was a cable news anchor for CNN's American Morning. From 2001 to 2007 she reported—and then anchored—cable news at Fox News.

== Early life and education ==
Kiran was born in Patan Hospital (Shanta Bhawan), Patan, Nepal. Seven months later, she moved with her parents and family to the United States. Her surname, Chetry, refers to the traditional caste of rulers and soldiers among Hindus in the Middle Hills of Nepal, and Kiran's father Hom Chetry belongs to this community. Kiran's mother Nancy is of German, Ukrainian, and Dutch ancestry. Her parents met while Nancy was a Peace Corps Volunteer in Nepal.

Kiran grew up in Gaithersburg, Maryland and attended Montgomery Blair High School in Silver Spring, Maryland, where she served in student government, danced on the pom squad, and competed on the swim team. Upon graduation she enrolled at the University of Maryland, College Park's College of Journalism, where she joined the Alpha Pi chapter of Delta Delta Delta sorority and received her Bachelor of Arts in broadcast journalism.

== Career ==
Chetry began her career in 1995 at News 21 in Rockville, Maryland. The next year she moved to WICU-TV in Erie, Pennsylvania, where she was the main anchor and health reporter. (She met her future husband Chris Knowles there who was the prime-time news anchor.) She received the Best Enterprise Reporting award from the Pennsylvania Associated Press Broadcasters Association in 1997 for her series "Young and Hooked," which looked at teen smoking. In 1999, Chetry moved from WICU-TV to KXTV in Sacramento, California, to work as a morning anchor and reporter.

=== Fox News ===
In 2001, Chetry joined Fox News Channel as a general reporter, first appearing on March 8, 2001, in a story about eating ice cream. The following year, in 2002, she was awarded the Making our Mark (MOM) Award from the Association of Nepalis in the Americas. At Fox News, she worked as a rotating anchor for Fox News Live and the early morning news program Fox & Friends First. In late 2005, she became a regular co-host on the network's weekend morning news program, Fox & Friends Weekend.

In 2006, Chetry made Maxim magazine's top-ten list of TV's sexiest news anchors, placing third on the list: she was ranked as America's sexiest female anchor and the world's second-sexiest female anchor.

In early 2007, as Chetry's contract with Fox News neared the end of its term, the network negotiated with Chetry's agent to renew her contract. Her contract was expected to be renewed with her continuing to co-host Fox & Friends Weekend. However, talks ended when Fox News claimed in a February 15, 2007, letter to Chetry's agent, that Chetry had demanded "that Fox News include a clause in her new agreement that would have been detrimental to other Fox News Talent." The cable news network added that it would not renew her contract and that she was free to leave before her contract's expiration. Chetry exercised that option. Chetry allegedly wanted a clause in her contract that would have had Gretchen Carlson, a co-anchor of Fox & Friends, fired. Chetry's agent countered that the allegation of Chetry's wanting Carlson fired was "absolutely false". Another source said that the clause in question merely requested a written clarification of whether Chetry would become a Fox & Friends co-host and, if so, when. If that were not to happen by a certain date, then Chetry would have a window to exit her new contract.

=== CNN ===
CNN hired Chetry following her release from Fox News. On February 16, 2007, Chetry began work as a CNN anchor and correspondent. That day, she served as a co-host on American Morning in the morning and, after being hired by CNN, anchored Anderson Cooper 360 that evening. She went on to substitute as an anchor for Paula Zahn Now and CNN Newsroom.

On April 4, 2007, CNN's President Jonathan Klein announced Chetry as the new co-anchor of American Morning, beginning on April 16, 2007. Her last day on American Morning and at CNN was July 29, 2011.

In August 2014, she co-anchored with Errol Barnett a few late-night telecasts for CNN International.

== Personal life ==
Chetry was married to Chris Knowles, a former Fox News Channel and weekend weathercaster at WPIX-TV; they divorced in 2013 and have two children, a son and a daughter. Chetry is a Roman Catholic. On Easter Vigil Saturday in April 2026, she was confirmed into the Catholic Church while already residing in Larchmont, New York. Before that, Chetry self-identified as an Episcopalian since she was baptized in 2008.
