= List of people diagnosed with coeliac disease =

List of people with celiac disease

The following is a list of notable people diagnosed with coeliac disease.

Name	Notability	Reference
Gordon Banks	British politician	
Alyssa Baumann	American artistic gymnast	
Amy Yoder Begley	American middle-distance runner	
Cedric Benson	American football player	
Jon Bernthal	American actor	
Ben Brown	Australian rules football player	
Sarah Joy Brown	American actress	
Joe C.	American rapper	
Meg Cabot	American author	
Jon Christos	English singer	
Heidi Collins	American news anchor	
maia arson crimew	Swiss developer and computer hacker	
Ty Dellandrea	Canadian ice hockey player	
Jennifer Esposito	American actress	
Susie Essman	American comedian and actress	
Victoria Groce	American quizzer and game show contestant	
Dennis Hallman	American mixed martial artist	
Elisabeth Hasselbeck	American television talk show host	
Bob Holness	British radio and television presenter	
Jameela Jamil	British radio and TV presenter and actress	
Gary Johnson	American politician	
Kaapo Kakko	Finnish professional ice hockey player	
Katharine, Duchess of Kent	British royal	
Claudia Koll	Italian actress and missionary	
Tom Laughlin	American actor	
Arvid Lindblad	English driver	
Betty McCollum	American politician and U.S. representative	
Megan McKenna	English television personality & singer	
Enos Mills	American author and naturalist	
Lisa Kennedy Montgomery	American political satirist	
Eve Muirhead	Scottish curler	
Michael Obiora	English actor	
Keith Olbermann	American sports and political commentator	
Adrianne Palicki	American actress	
Caroline Quentin	English actress	
Mickey Redmond	Canadian professional hockey player	
Emmy Rossum	American actress	
Ivete Sangalo	Brazilian singer	
Stelio Savante	South African actor	
Brooke Stratton	Australian track & field athlete	
Deborah Ann Woll	American actress	
