= Saint Peter's Peacocks men's basketball =

American college basketball team

2025–26 Saint Peter's Peacocks men's basketball team
- University: Saint Peter's University
- First season: 1930–31; 96 years ago
- Head coach: Bashir Mason (4th season)
- Location: Jersey City, New Jersey
- Arena: Run Baby Run Arena (capacity: 3,200)
- Conference: MAAC
- Nickname: Peacocks
- Colors: Blue and white

NCAA Division I tournament Elite Eight
- 2022
Other NCAA Division I tournament results
Sweet Sixteen	2022
Appearances	1991, 1995, 2011, 2022, 2024

Conference tournament champions
- 1991, 1995, 2011, 2022, 2024

Conference regular-season champions
- 1982, 1984, 1987; MCC: 1967, 1968, 1969

CIT tournament champions
- 2017

Uniforms
Home	Away

The Saint Peter's Peacocks men's basketball team is the NCAA Division I intercollegiate men's basketball program that represents Saint Peter's University in Jersey City, New Jersey. The school's team competes in the Metro Atlantic Athletic Conference (MAAC) and plays their home games in Run Baby Run Arena. They are currently led by fourth-year head coach Bashir Mason, who was hired on April 12, 2022. The Peacocks have appeared in the NCAA tournament five times, including a historic run to the Elite Eight as a 15-seed in 2022 where they finished the season ranked No. 24 in the nation by the USA Today Coaches Poll with the best NCAA post-season run and the most wins by a MAAC program in a single NCAA tournament.

In 2004 and 2005, Keydren Clark led the nation in points scored per game, becoming just the eighth player to repeat as NCAA Division I scoring champion. In 2006, Clark became only the seventh NCAA player to score more than 3,000 points in a career. He finished his career as the sixth all-time NCAA leading scorer, the record holder for the most three-point shots made in NCAA history with 435 and was named MAAC Player of the Year. Clark led the MAAC in scoring in all four seasons (2002–2006) at Saint Peter's and is the all-time leading scorer in university history with 3,058 points.

== History ==
Saint Peter's University is one of the founding members of the Metro Atlantic Athletic Conference (MAAC), which began play in men's basketball with the 1981–82 season. Since then, the Peacocks have compiled the second most wins of any MAAC team and have won the MAAC Championship five times (1991, 1995, 2011, 2022, 2024), tied for the third most all-time. Saint Peter's previously competed in the Metropolitan Collegiate Conference (MCC) from 1965 to 1969. Basketball has long been the most popular sport at the university.

Saint Peter's first season of basketball was 1930–31 which was the also the same year the college re-opened on a new campus following its twelve-year closure from the impacts of World War I. To celebrate the school's rebirth, the dean named the Peacock as its official mascot. Collins Memorial Gymnasium was the first campus building and where the Peacocks played most of their home games into the 1950s and continued to practice until its demolition.

The Peacocks recorded their first consecutive winning seasons under head coach George Babich in 1947–48 (16–5) and 1948–49 (18–5).

In the 1950s, Saint Peter's found sustained success with the hiring of head coach Don Kennedy ahead of the 1950–51 season as the fifth head coach in program history. The Peacocks would make back-to-back NAIA Tournament appearances in 1953 and 1954. Saint Peter's would make a run to the NAIA Quarterfinals in 1954 where they would lose to Arkansas Tech 77–81. They would then go on to make back-to-back appearances in the National Invitation Tournament (NIT) in 1957 and 1958.

The Peacocks first gained national recognition on March 18, 1968, with a stunning upset. Led by head coach Don Kennedy, Saint Peter's defeated the nationally ranked No. 10 Duke Blue Devils 100–71 in the 1968 NIT Quarterfinals in front of a sold-out crowd of 19,500 at Madison Square Garden. This was the first sell-out for a college basketball game at the current Madison Square Garden. The Peacocks advanced to the sold-out semifinal game against the Kansas Jayhawks led by future Hall of Famer Jo Jo White. Demand to attend the game was so high that Saint Peter's arranged for the game to be shown on a CCTV feed in the Stanley Theater at Journal Square to a capacity crowd. The Peacocks NIT run ended in a 46–58 defeat and a fourth-place finish. This was the second of three consecutive NIT appearances for Saint Peter's. During the 1967–68 season, the Peacocks went 24–4, 8–0 in conference play and averaged 94 points per game. The team was later nicknamed the "Run, Baby Run" Team after that phrase was found written on a blackboard by Peacocks reserve center Tom Schwester inside the door to the Peacock locker room after their win over Duke.

In 1972, Don Kennedy ended his twenty-two year career as the winningest head coach in program history with a 323–195 (.624) record from 1950 to 1972. Under Kennedy, the Peacocks became known for their fast-pace offensive tactics even with the addition of the shot clock in 1954. During his tenure, the Peacocks registered a winning season in 19 of 22 seasons, three 20-win seasons, including the program's first 20-win campaign in 1957–58, a program-record 24 victories in 1967–68 and appearances in five NIT Tournaments and two NAIA Tournaments.

On November 29, 1975, the Victor R. Yanitelli, S.J. Recreational Life Center (Yanitelli Center) opened on campus on the former site of Collins Gymnasium as the new home court of the Peacocks with an inaugural game against the Dartmouth Big Green. Prior to its opening, Saint Peter's hosted its home games at the nearby Jersey City Armory and still occasionally use the venue for high-profile games.

From 1975 to 1989, the Peacocks made seven appearances in the NIT (1975, 1976, 1980, 1982, 1984, 1987, 1989). Saint Peter's would make its deepest run during that span in the 1980 NIT. Led by head coach Bob Dukiet, the Peacocks defeated the UConn Huskies (71–56) and the Duqesnse Dukes (34–33) en route to a tough Quarterfinal matchup against the Sidney Green led UNLV Runnin' Rebels where they would lose 63–67.

During this period, prior to joining the MAAC in 1981, the Peacocks participated in the ECAC men's basketball tournaments (regional end-of-season tournaments played by Division I schools that were independent, with Saint Peter's being in the Metro region) in 1975, 1976, 1980, 1981. The Peacocks defeated the Fordham Rams 65–47 in the semifinals to make it to the 1980 ECAC Metro Championship game where they were defeated by their future MAAC rival, the Iona Gaels, 64–46.

In the early 1990s, Saint Peter's began to find success in the MAAC Tournament under head coach Ted Fiore. In 1991, the Peacocks won their first MAAC Championship over the Iona Gaels 64–58 to send them to their first ever NCAA Tournament. The No. 5 Texas Longhorns would defeat them 65–73 in the First Round of the Midwest Region. In 1995, the Peacocks were again MAAC Champions after upsetting the No. 1 Manhattan Jaspers 80–78 in overtime. They would be matched up against the Marcus Camby led No. 2 Umass Minutemen in the NCAA Tournament where the Minutemen would be victorious over the Peacocks 68–51 in the First Round of the East Region.

On June 17, 2002, Saint Peter's was one of sixteen schools selected to participate in the NIT Season Tip-Off Tournament. On November 18, 2002, the Peacocks played fellow Jesuit university program the Xavier Musketeers with the Peacocks falling in the opening round 48–87.

From 2002 to 2006, the Peacocks were led by starting point guard Keydren "Kee-Kee' Clark who was one of the most prolific scorers in NCAA Division I history. During his college career at Saint Peter's, Clark amassed 3,058 points and averaged 29.5 points a game. In 2003, he was named MAAC Rookie of the Year. In 2004 and 2005, he led the nation in points scored per game, becoming just the eighth player to repeat as NCAA Division I scoring champion. On March 4, 2006, Clark became only the seventh NCAA player to score more than 3,000 points in his career; on the next day, he passed Hersey Hawkins to become the sixth-leading scorer of all time. The milestone happened in a game where the Peacocks upset the No. 1 Manhattan Jaspers 84–74 in the MAAC Tournament semi-finals. He was later named 2006 MAAC Player of the Year. Clark finished his college career as the sixth all-time NCAA leading scorer and as the NCAA record holder for the most three-pointers made with 435. He was later passed by JJ Redick who finished his college career with 457. Clark led the MAAC in scoring in all four seasons at Saint Peter's and is the all-time leading scorer in Saint Peter's University and New Jersey collegiate history with 3,058 points. He also holds the Yanitelli Center scoring record for most points in a game with 44. Clark returned to the Peacocks ahead of the 2022–23 season and is currently Director of Player Development and an assistant coach.

On December 27 and 28, 2005, Saint Peter's played in the Panasonic Holiday Festival at Madison Square Garden. They took on the UMass Minutemen in the opening round where the Minutemen defeated the Peacocks 66–49. They were then matched up against the Columbia Lions where the Peacocks won 63–54 to finish third in the regular season tournament.

On November 17, 2009, Saint Peter's garnered national exposure by hosting the Monmouth Hawks as part of the second annual ESPN's 24–Hour College Hoops Tip-Off Marathon. The marathon of live games across ESPN's networks marked the first day of the college basketball season. Ahead of the game, the university hosted an 11-hour "all-nighter" of campus activities with free breakfast and a pre-game pep rally. The game tipped-off at 6:05 a.m. and ended with the Peacocks defeating the Hawks, 58–34 in front of 1,246 students, alumni and fans.

In 2011, the Peacocks won their third MAAC Championship over the No. 2 Iona Gaels 62–57 which sent them to the 2011 NCAA Division I men's basketball tournament. This was their first trip to the NCAA Tournament since 1995 and third trip overall. Saint Peter's drew the No. 3 Purdue Boilermakers in the First round. Purdue would go on to defeat Saint Peter's 65–43 in the Southwest Region.

In 2017, led by head coach John Dunne, the Peacocks went 23–13 and 14–6 in conference to play to finish second in the MAAC. In the MAAC Tournament, they defeated the Canisus Golden Griffens in the quarterfinals 61–58 before losing to the lona Gaels in the semifinals 65–73. They were invited to play in the 2017 CollegeInsider.com Postseason Tournament (CIT) where they won their first-ever national postseason title by defeating the Texas A&M–Corpus Christi Islanders 62–61 becoming just the second MAAC program to win a national postseason championship. Saint Peter's hosted and defeated the Furman Paladins in the semifinals of the CIT 77–51 at the Yanitelli Center marking the first time Saint Peter's ever hosted a national post-season tournament.

On July 22, 2020, Saint Peter's announced that through a $5 million lead gift from alum and former basketball player Thomas P. Mac Mahon, they would begin a phased renovation of the Yanitelli Center. The renovation included the creation of a more modern basketball/volleyball arena with new retractable bleachers with an allotment of chairback seating, a full replacement of the hardwood court surface, updated branding and signage, a reimagined entryway to the facility, enhanced lighting and new video scoreboards. Mac Mahon, a 1968 graduate of Saint Peter's, and a member of the Saint Peter's University Board of Trustees, decided to honor his former 1967–68 teammates by naming the renovated space the "Run Baby Run Arena" after that team's nickname for its high-scoring offense. The new arena debuted on November 1, 2021, with Saint Peter's defeating fellow Jersey City school New Jersey City University 90–66 in an exhibition game.

In 2022, the Peacocks won their fourth MAAC Championship defeating the Monmouth Hawks 60–54 and earning a spot in the 2022 NCAA Division I men's basketball tournament where they would again earn national recognition. Led by head coach Shaheen Holloway, Saint Peter's became the tenth No. 15 seed in history to upset a No. 2 seed after knocking off the Kentucky Wildcats 85–79 in overtime. They then defeated the Murray State Racers in the next round 70–60, becoming the third No. 15 seed in tournament history (and the third in the last nine years) to make the Sweet 16. In the Sweet 16, they upset the No. 3 seed Purdue Boilermakers 67–64, to become the first No. 15 seed in tournament history to advance to the Elite Eight. Their historic Cinderella run came to an end with a 49–69 loss against eventual national runner-up No. 8 North Carolina. The Peacocks concluded their historic 2021–22 season with an overall record of 22–12 and the best NCAA post-season run with the most wins in a single NCAA Tournament by any MAAC program (men or women) in the conference's 41-year history. Following the tournament, Jersey City held a parade for the team along John F. Kennedy Boulevard to celebrate the Peacocks' historic run. On April 5, 2022, Saint Peter's was ranked No. 24 nationally in the season's final USA Today Coaches Poll.

On November 15, 2023, the Peacocks took on the FDU Knights in a regionally and nationally televised game on the YES Network dubbed the "Battle of the Bracket Busters" & "Battle for the Hackensack" at the Knights home court, the Bogota Savings Bank Center. Both New Jersey programs were recent NCAA Tournament bracket busters with Saint Peter's being the first No. 15 seed to make a run to the Elite Eight in 2022 and FDU becoming the second No. 16 seed and first First Four team to beat a No. 1 seed when they defeated the Purdue Boilermakers, 63–58 in 2023. The Knights made two free throws with 1.7 seconds left to defeat the Peacocks 71–70.

In 2024, the Peacocks returned to the NCAA tournament after they defeated the No. 2 Fairfield Stags in the MAAC Championship, 68–63 for their fifth conference title. Saint Peter's would not be able to replicate their 2021–22 Cinderella run season and lost in the First Round to the No. 2 Tennessee Volunteers 49–83 in the Midwest Region.

On November 26, 2024, the Peacocks played in a "Battle of the Bracket Busters" & "Battle for the Hackensack" rematch against the FDU Knights at Bogota Savings Bank Center that was also televised on the YES Network. Saint Peter's avenged their 1-point loss the year before with a buzzer beater layup to defeat Fairleigh Dickinson 78–76.

== Postseason results ==
=== NCAA tournament results ===
The Peacocks have appeared in the NCAA tournament five times. Their combined record is 3–5.

Year	Seed	Round	Opponent	Result
1991	#12	First Round	#5 Texas	L 65–73
1995	#15	First Round	#2 Massachusetts	L 51–68
2011	#14	First Round	#3 Purdue	L 43–65
2022	#15	First Round; Second Round; Sweet Sixteen; Elite Eight	#2 Kentucky #7 Murray State #3 Purdue #8 North Carolina +	W 85–79^{OT} W 70–60; W 67–64; L 49–69
2024	#15	First Round	#2 Tennessee	L 49–83

+ Indicates National Championship Game participant.

=== NIT results ===
The Peacocks have appeared in the National Invitation Tournament (NIT) twelve times. Their combined record is 5–13.

Year	Round	Opponent	Result
1957	First Round	Dayton	L 71–79
1958	First Round	St. Joseph's	L 76–83
1967	First Round	Southern Illinois	L 58–103
1968	First Round; Quarterfinals; Semifinals; 3rd Place Game	Marshall; Duke; Kansas; Notre Dame	W 102–93; W 100–71; L 46–58; L 78–81
1969	First Round; Quarterfinals	Tulsa; Temple	W 75–71; L 78–94
1975	First Round	Oregon	L 79–85
1976	First Round	Holy Cross	L 78–84
1980	First Round; Second Round; Quarterfinals	Connecticut; Duquesne; UNLV	W 71–56; W 34–33; L 63–67
1982	First Round	Syracuse	L 75–84
1984	First Round	Tennessee	L 40–54
1987	First Round	Saint Louis	L 60–76
1989	First Round	Villanova	L 56–76

=== CIT results ===
The Peacocks have appeared in the CollegeInsider.com Postseason Tournament (CIT) once, which they won in 2017.

Year	Round	Opponent	Result
2017	First Round; Quarterfinals; Semifinals; Championship Game	Albany; Texas State; Furman; Texas A&M–Corpus Christi	W 59–55; W 49–44; W 77–51; W 62–61

=== NAIA tournament results ===
The Peacocks have appeared in the NAIA Tournament twice. Their combined record is 3–2.

Year	Round	Opponent	Result
1953	First round Second round	Southwestern Oklahoma State; East Texas State	W 81–60; L 68–85
1954	First round Second round Quarterfinals	Wayland Baptist; Regis; Arkansas Tech	W 76–63; W 63–58; L 77–81

== Coaches ==
The Hall of Fame high school basketball coach Bob Hurley is a Saint Peter's alum, Class of '71, and former freshman Peacock basketball player where under head coach Don Kennedy, he averaged 20 points per game. Hurley has credited the "speed and precision" of Kennedy's fast break offense as ahead of its time and the template for the principals he employed as the head coach of the St. Anthony High School Friars in Jersey City. Hurley used those principles to lead St. Anthony's becoming the winningest high school basketball program in United States history.

The following is a list of Saint Peter's Peacocks men's basketball head coaches.

Tenure	Coach	Years	Record	Pct.
1930–1933	Tommy Meyers	3	12–29	.293
1933–1934	Nicholas Landers	1	4–9	.308
1934–1942	H. Morgan Sweeteaman	8	54–96	.360
1942–1946	(No team fielded)			
1946–1949	George Babich	3	39–26	.600
1949–1950	Pete Caruso	1	13–11–1	.540
1950–1972	Don Kennedy	22	323–195	.624
1972–1974	Bernie Ockene	2	16–36	.308
1974–1977	Dick McDonald	3	47–36	.566
1977–1979	Bob Kelly	2	18–33	.353
1979–1986	Bob Dukiet	7	135–64	.613
1986–1995	Ted Fiore	9	151–110	.579
1995–2000	Rodger Blind	5	55–84	.396
2000–2006	Bob Leckie	6	67–107	.385
2006–2018	John Dunne	12	153–225	.405
2018–2022	Shaheen Holloway	4	64–57	.529
2022–present	Bashir Mason	4	62–60	.508

== Awards and honors ==
MAAC Coach of the Year

- Bob Dukiet – 1982
- Ted Fiore – 1987, 1989, 1991
- Shaheen Holloway – 2020

MAAC Player of the Year

- William Brown – 1982
- Keydren Clark – 2006

MAAC Rookie of the Year

- Harun Ramey – 1992
- Ricky Bellinger – 1997
- Keydren Clark – 2003
- Shane Nichols – 2004
- Aaron Estrada – 2020

MAAC Defensive Player of the Year

- Chazz Patterson – 2017
- KC Ndefo – 2020, 2021, 2022
- Latrell Reid – 2024

MAAC Sixth Player of the Year

- KC Nedfo – 2020

MAAC Tournament Most Valuable Player

- Marvin Andrews – 1991
- Randy Holmes – 1995
- Jeron Belin – 2011
- KC Ndefo – 2022
- Corey Washington – 2024

MAAC Scholar Athlete of the Year

- Correy Hinnant – 2005

First Team All-MAAC

- William Brown – 1982
- Shelton Gibbs – 1982, 1983
- Phil Jamison – 1983
- Tommy Best – 1983, 1984
- Daren Rowe – 1987
- Alex Roberts – 1988
- Willie Haynes – 1989
- Tony Walker – 1991
- Luis Arrosa – 1995
- Keydren Clark – 2004, 2005, 2006
- Quadir Welton – 2017
- KC Ndefo – 2021
- Corey Washington – 2024
- Brent Bland – 2026

Peter A. Carlesimo Award (Metropolitan Coach of the Year)

- Bob Dukiet – 1982, 1984
- Ted Fiore – 1987, 1991
- Shaheen Holloway – 2022

Haggerty Award (Metropolitan Player of the Year)

- Keydren Clark – 2005

Metropolitan Rookie of the Year

- Keydren Clark – 2003

First Team All-Met

- William Brown – 1982
- Tommy Best – 1984
- Alex Roberts – 1988
- Willie Haynes – 1989
- Keydren Clark – 2003, 2004, 2005, 2006

NCAA Tournament All-Regional Team

- Daryl Banks III – 2022 (All-East)
- Doug Edert – 2022 (All-East)

Lefty Driesell Award (National Top Defensive Player)

- KC Ndefo – 2022

CIT Most Valuable Player

- Quadir Welton – 2017

== Peacocks in professional basketball ==
=== National Basketball Association (NBA) ===
Name	Position	Draft Year	Draft Team
Thomas F. X. Smith	F	1951	New York Knicks
Bill Smith	G/F	1961	New York Knicks
Elnardo Webster	SF	1969	New York Knicks
Rich Rinaldi	SG	1971	Baltimore Bullets

=== NBA G League ===
Name	Position	Years	Teams
Nate Brown	PG	2009	Austin Spurs
KC Ndefo	PF	2024	South Bay Lakers

=== International Leagues ===
- Kenny Grant, SF (1972–1984)
- Nate Brown, PG (2004, 2005–2008)
- Keydren Clark, PG (2006–2018)
- Jeron Belin, SF/PF (2013–2014)
- Quadir Welton, C/F (2019–2021)
- KC Ndefo, PF (2025–present)
- Latrell Reid, G (2025–present)

== See also ==
- Saint Peter's Peacocks men's basketball statistical leaders
