= Bob Cain (reporter) =

American journalist

Bob Cain (August 11, 1934 – September 2, 2014) was an American radio and television journalist known for his work on NBC Radio from 1971 until 1980 and on CNN from 1980 until 2002.

Cain was an anchor for CNN Daybreak and during the Gulf War and the Centennial Olympic Park bombing. Before joining CNN, Cain was an NBC Radio correspondent based in New York City. During his 10 years with NBC, Cain covered major national and local stories, including both the Democratic and Republican National Conventions in 1976, the arrest of “Son of Sam,” the resignation of President Nixon, the New York visit of Pope John Paul II and the 1976 power blackouts in New York City.

Cain's accolades include a 1988 American Bar Association “Silver Gavel Award” for his work on the CNN documentary, “A More Perfect Union"; a 1975 George Peabody Award for his part in “Second Sunday"; a segment of the NBC News Radio series “Communism in the '70s”; a 1972 New York Council of Churches Award for a documentary on poverty in New York; and a 1966 Providence, R.I., Toastmaster's Gavel Award for his controversial radio talk show, “Open Line.”
