= David W. Burcham =

American academic (born 1951)

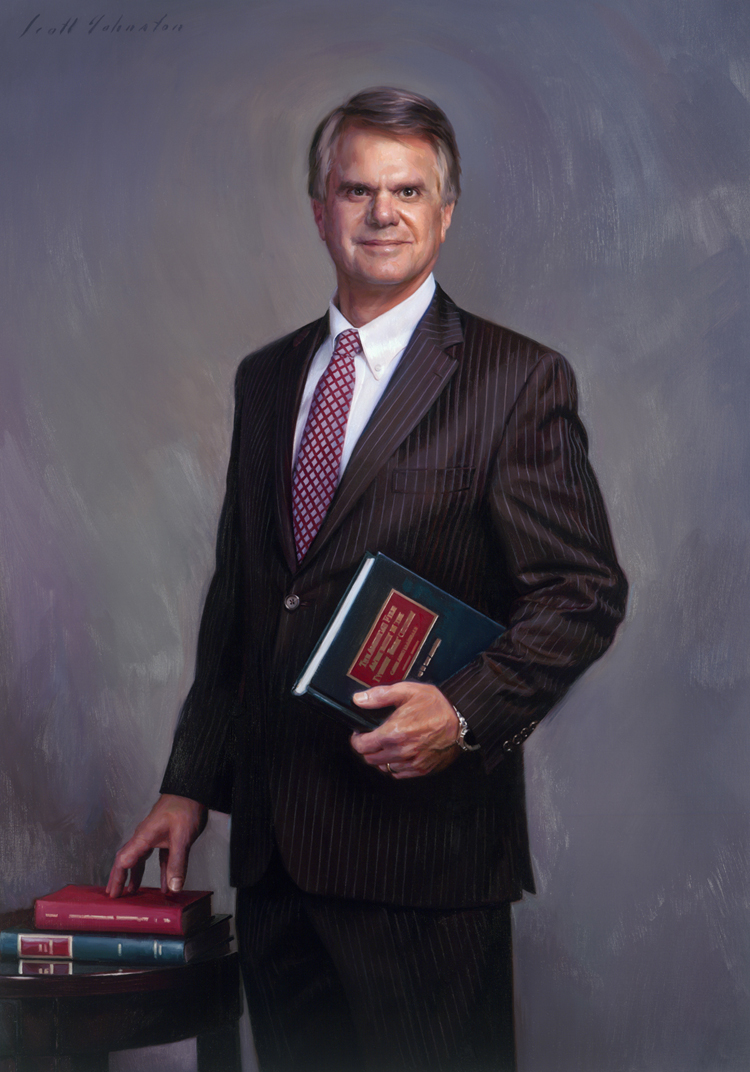
- Burcham's official portrait by Scott Wallace Johnston

15th President of Loyola Marymount University
- In office October 4, 2010 – May 31, 2015
- Preceded by: Robert B. Lawton
- Succeeded by: Timothy Law Snyder

Interim President of Loyola Marymount University
- In office May 31, 2010 – October 4, 2010
- Preceded by: Robert B. Lawton, S.J.

Personal details
- Born: 1951 (age 74–75) California, U.S.
- Education: Occidental College (BA); California State University, Long Beach (MA); Loyola Marymount University (JD)

David W. Burcham (born 1951) is an American academic and lawyer. He was the 15th president of Loyola Marymount University, serving from October 4, 2010 to May 31, 2015. He is a 1984 graduate of Loyola Law School, and was both the first lay president and the first non-Catholic president in the university's history.

== Education and career ==
Burcham earned a Bachelor of Arts in political science from Occidental College in 1973, and a Master of Arts in education administration from California State University, Long Beach in 1978. He graduated first in his class from Loyola Law School, and at the U.S. Court of Appeals for the Third Circuit for Chief Judge Ruggero J. Aldisert (1984–86) then clerked at the U.S. Supreme Court for Justice Byron White (1986–87). He was later in private practice at Gibson, Dunn & Crutcher (1987–91).

After seven years in public and private practice, he returned to Loyola Law School to teach. He was appointed senior vice president of LMU and dean of the law school in 2000. During his tenure as dean of Loyola Law School, Burcham forged strategic improvements in the curriculum. He oversaw a host of innovative programs, including the Business Law Practicum, the Center for Juvenile Law & Policy, the Legal Masters Program (LLM) in International Legal Practice, the London IP Institute, and the Tax LLM program.

Burcham increased the number of full-time law professors by almost 15 percent. He also established the Center for the Study of Law & Genocide, the Civil Justice Program, the Distinguished William J. Landers Lecture on Prosecutorial Ethics, the Fidler Institute on Criminal Justice, the Intellectual Property Special Focus Series, the Journalist Law School and the Sports Law Institute. He raised money to establish seven new faculty chairs, as well as paying for and completing the Girardi Advocacy Center and its flagship classroom, the Robinson Courtroom.

He served as the law school dean until he was named LMU's executive vice president and provost in 2008.

== See also ==
- List of law clerks for the sixth seat of the Supreme Court of the United States

Academic offices
Preceded by Robert B. Lawton	Presidents of Loyola Marymount University; 2010–2015	Succeeded by Timothy Law Snyder
