= Nate Brown (basketball) =

Basketball player

Personal information
- Born: October 10, 1980 (age 46)
- Listed height: 6 ft 1 in (1.85 m)
- Listed weight: 190 lb (86 kg)

Career information
- College: Monroe (1998–2000); Saint Peter's (2000–2002)
- NBA D-League draft: 2012: 8th round, 126th overall pick
- Drafted by: Springfield Armor
- Playing career: 2002–2012
- Position: Point guard

Career history
- 2004: Þór Þorlákshöfn
- 2004–2005: New Jersey Flyers
- 2005: Strong Island Sound
- 2005–2006: Snæfell
- 2006–2007: ÍR
- 2007: AMSB
- 2007–2008: ÍR
- 2008: Snæfell
- 2009: Austin Spurs

Career highlights
- Icelandic Cup (2007); Úrvalsdeild assists leader (2008); steals leader (2008)

Nate Brown (born October 10, 1980) is an American former professional basketball player. He spent the majority of his career in Iceland where he won the Icelandic Cup in 2007.

== College career ==
After spending two years at Monroe College, Brown transferred to Saint Peter's University in 2000. He played two seasons for the Saint Peter's Peacocks, starting all 28 games during his senior season, averaging 9.4 points and 4.1 assists.

== Professional career ==
In December 2003, Brown signed with Úrvalsdeild karla club Þór Þorlákshöfn. He debuted on January 4, scoring 22 points in a losing effort against ÍR. For the season, he averaged 22.1 points and 6.1 assists but was unable to prevent Þór from being relegated to the second-tier 1. deild karla.

After spending the 2004–2005 season with the New Jersey Flyers in the United States Basketball League, where he averaged 12.5 points and 4.6 assists in 17 games, Brown returned to Iceland and signed with Snæfell in the fall of 2005. In 19 regular season games for Snæfell, he averaged 19.7 points and 6.7 assists.

The following season, Brown signed with ÍR. In February 2007, he helped the club win the Icelandic Cup after defeating Hamar/Selfoss in the Cup finals, 83–81. In the fourth quarter of the game, Brown stepped up and scored 12 of his team high 17 points.

Brown started 2007–2008 season with LNB Pro B club Aix Maurienne Savoie Basket where he averaged 10.5 points and 4.7 assists before being released in late November. A month later, Brown returned to ÍR and went on to lead the Úrvalsdeild in assists, averaging 7.7 assists in 14 games. During the playoffs, Brown set a playoffs record with his 18 assists in a victory against Keflavík.

Brown started the 2008–2009 season with Snæfell but due to the Icelandic financial crisis the club released him in early October after two games.

In January 2009, Brown signed with the Austin Spurs. In 13 games, he averaged 7.5 points and 4.8 assists. In 2012, he was selected by the Springfield Armor in the NBA D-League draft with the 126th pick but was released by the club on November 20, before the start of the season.
