= Carol Costello =

American journalist

- Born: October 11, 1961 (age 64); Minerva, Ohio, U.S.
- Education: Kent State University (BA)
- Occupations: LMU First Lady and Professor
- Notable credit(s): CNN Newsroom; CNN Daybreak; The Situation Room; American Morning
- Spouse: Timothy Law Snyder

Carol Costello (born October 11, 1961) is an American television anchor and former host of CNN Newsroom. In 2017, she left CNN to join sister network HLN, based in Los Angeles. In October 2018, HLN announced that Costello would be let go, with the final broadcast of her show taking place on October 26.

== Early life and education ==
Costello is a graduate of Minerva High School, a public high school in Minerva, Ohio, and Kent State University where she earned a B.A. in journalism. After attending Kent State University, Costello worked at Akron, Ohio's WAKR-TV as an award-winning police and court reporter. Following that Costello was an Emmy Award-winning anchor/reporter for WSYX, the ABC affiliate, and WBNS 10-TV, the CBS affiliate in Columbus, Ohio. She also worked as the 6 and 11pm news anchor for WBAL-TV in Baltimore between 1992 and 1995.

== Career ==
=== CNN ===
Costello worked as an anchor at CNN Headline News (now called HLN) and was also the anchor of Good Morning Washington and an investigative reporter at WJLA-TV, the ABC affiliate in Washington, D.C., during the September 11 attacks.

She previously worked out of the network's New York City bureau. She was part of CNN's Peabody-winning coverage of Hurricane Katrina and the 2008 presidential election, and also covered the Virginia Tech massacre, the inauguration of Barack Obama and the Casey Anthony trial. Costello has done in-depth reporting on bullying, coal ash, and women's issues. After a CNN viewer nominated her, Costello ran with the Olympic torch through the streets of Atlanta prior to the Atlanta Olympics.

As a reporter and anchor, Costello has interviewed Jimmy Carter, Bill Clinton, Hillary Clinton and George H. W. Bush. Previously, Costello anchored the CNN early morning program CNN Daybreak and also was news reader and correspondent on American Morning. She was the anchor of CNN Daybreak, then a New York-based correspondent, and subsequently a contributor to The Situation Room. Costello hosted the 9 am–11 am slot of CNN Newsroom, based out of CNN's New York news bureau.

Costello elicited criticism when she referred to audio of Bristol Palin describing an assault on her to police as "quite possibly the best minute and a half of audio we've ever come across." Paul Bedard called Costello's "rude and crude enjoyment" an easy slap by a prominent female media star on a young woman. Costello later stated that "in retrospect, I deserve such criticism and would like to apologize."

On January 30, 2017, Costello announced that she would return to HLN to host a new program from Los Angeles. On August 21, 2017, her new show Across America with Carol Costello debuted.

On October 16, 2018, it was announced by HLN that Costello was to be laid off, along with Michaela Pereira and Ashleigh Banfield, as part of the network's decision to scale back their live news programming. The final broadcasts for their programs took place on Friday, October 26, 2018. Although both Ashleigh Banfield and Michaela Pereira stayed to host their shows until their last days, Costello did not appear on air after October 16, 2018, with CNN correspondent Dianne Gallagher hosting the final broadcast.

Following HLN, Costello took an active role at Loyola Marymount University where she served as first lady until her husband's retirement in May 2025. She is a professor in the newly established journalism major and now also hosts a podcast developed by the university. According to Costello herself, she had been wanting to start a new venture for a while, even back on her days at CNN.

== Personal life ==
A former resident of Atlanta, Georgia, Costello moved to the New York area after marrying Timothy Law Snyder in 2004. She and Snyder later moved to Baltimore, Maryland. In October 2015, Snyder was named president of Loyola Marymount University in Los Angeles. In January 2017, Costello cited her husband's relocation as a primary factor in her decision to leave CNN for HLN and move to Los Angeles.

In April 2015, Costello wrote that she became a "lapsed Catholic" after losing her younger brother Jimmy to cancer when she was 25. However, she stated that Pope Francis "reawakened my faith".
