= Norma Quarles =

American television reporter and anchor (born 1936)

- Born: November 11, 1936 (age 88); New York City, United States
- Occupation(s): Television reporter, anchor
- Years active: 1965–2001

Norma Quarles (born November 11, 1936) is a retired American television reporter and anchor. She worked for NBC, CNN and PBS during her career.

== Early life ==
Quarles was born in New York City in 1936 into a Trinidadian family. Her father worked at Macy's in New York which led to her being cast as an extra in Miracle on 34th Street in 1947. Quarles attended Hunter College and City College of New York before earning her real estate license and moving to Chicago.

== Career ==
She began her career in 1965 as a radio reporter in Chicago. She worked as a general assignment reporter for television station WKYC in Cleveland for three years, where she was the first African-American woman to file reports for a network. She then moved to WNBC in New York where she served as an anchor for the local morning news. While at WNBC, she requested to substitute Barbara Walters on The Today Show, but NBC feared that southern viewers would protest and refused her request. In 1977, Quarles began producing Urban Tales for WMAQ-TV in Chicago. The series' success led her to being named a national NBC correspondent. In 1984, she served as a panelist at the vice presidential debate. In 1988, Quarles joined CNN as a news anchor on CNN Daybreak. She anchored the show for two years and then switched to working as a correspondent, a job which she held until 1999. She then served as a reporter for Religion and Ethics Newsweekly on PBS, retiring in 2001. Quarles was inducted into the National Association of Black Journalists Hall of Fame in 1990.

== Film work ==
Quarles played a reporter in The Last Days of Disco and was an extra in Miracle on 34th Street.

== Awards and honors ==
- 1973 Front Page Award
- 1990 National Association of Black Journalists Hall of Fame inductee
- 1993 CINE Golden Eagle
