= Donald Merrifield =

American Jesuit, physicist and university president

The Reverend Donald P. Merrifield SJ
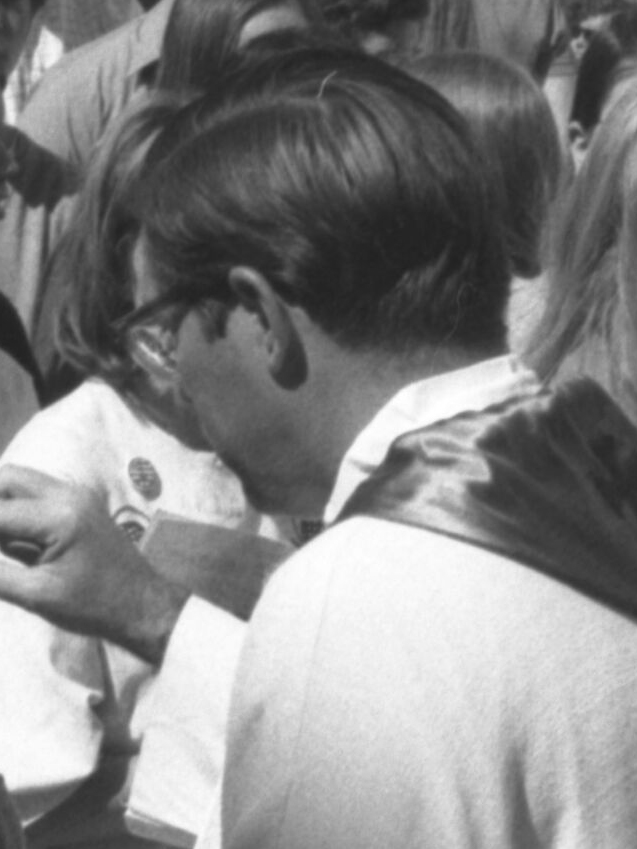
- Merrifield in 1970

11th President of Loyola Marymount University
- In office 1969–1984
- Preceded by: Charles S. Cassasa
- Succeeded by: James N. Loughran

Personal details
- Born: November 14, 1928 Los Angeles, California, U.S.
- Died: February 25, 2010 (aged 81) San Jose, California, U.S.
- Education: California Institute of Technology; University of Notre Dame; Massachusetts Institute of Technology
- Profession: Jesuit, physicist

Donald Paul Merrifield SJ (November 14, 1928 – February 25, 2010) was an American Jesuit who served as the 11th president of Loyola University of Los Angeles. He became the first president of Loyola Marymount University president upon Loyola University's merger with Marymount College in 1973 and remained as the school's president until 1984. Under Merrifield, Loyola Marymount went through a period of rapid expansion in which thirteen new buildings were constructed on the main campus.

== Biography ==
=== Early life ===
Merrifield was born in Los Angeles on November 14, 1928. He graduated from Inglewood High School. He received his bachelor's degree in physics from California Institute of Technology in 1950. He went on to obtain a master's degree in physics from University of Notre Dame in 1951 and his doctorate in physics from the Massachusetts Institute of Technology (M.I.T.) in 1962.

=== Career ===
Donald Merrifield entered the Society of Jesus in 1951 and was ordained a Roman Catholic priest in 1965 at Blessed Sacrament Catholic Church, Hollywood.

He taught physics at the University of San Francisco, Santa Clara University and Loyola University of Los Angeles before becoming president of Loyola in 1969. He also worked as a consultant at NASA's Jet Propulsion Laboratory in Pasadena, California from 1962 until 1969.

=== Loyola Marymount University ===
Merrifield was appointed as the 11th President of the Loyola University of Los Angeles in 1969. Instead of elaborate inauguration celebrations, he asked that celebrations be kept simple so extra funds could be spent on minority scholarships. A strong advocate for interfaith relations, Merrifield had Rabbi Alfred Wolf give the invocation at his inauguration.

When Loyola University and nearby Marymount College merged and assumed the name Loyola Marymount University, Merrifield was selected to remain president of the university. The academic vice president of Marymount College, Sister Renee Harrangue, R.S.H.M., Ph.D., was appointed Provost. Under Fr. Merrifield, thirteen new buildings were constructed on Loyola Marymount's Westchester neighborhood of Los Angeles.

The thirteen buildings constructed during Merrifield's tenure as president include the Von der Ahe Communication Arts Building, the George Page Baseball Stadium, Doolan Hall, Gersten Pavilion, Burns Fine Art Center, the Laband Art Gallery, the Leavey Faculty Center and the Loyola Apartments.

Merrifield also oversaw the expansion of Loyola Law School's campus in Pico-Union, near downtown Los Angeles. Merrifield and the university commissioned internationally known architect Frank Gehry to design the new campus, which was needed to accommodate increased enrollment.

He also emphasized increased minority enrollment in the university's admissions process through scholarships, recruitment drives and financial aid. Loyola Marymount added Latino and African American studies programs to its curriculum during his time in office. Merrifield also helped to form the Loyola Marymount Mexican American Alumni Association in 1981.

He worked closely with the brothers of the Missionaries of Charity to benefit the homeless of Los Angeles.

Merrifield stepped down as president of Loyola Marymount in 1984 and was succeeded by James N. Loughran, S.J. However, he remained at the university as its chancellor until 2002.

=== Later life ===
Merrifield was assigned to the Jesuit community in Honolulu, Hawaii, in 2003. While living in Hawaii Merrifield worked with Oahu's Hispanic population, a prison ministry, and the Catholic community in the Mānoa-Punahou area. He continued to be actively involved in university and student life in Hawaii. He served on the board of governors for Chaminade University of Honolulu. He also became involved with the Newman Center at the University of Hawaii at Manoa, where he led retreats for students.

Merrifield provided breakfast for dozens of homeless at Ala Moana Beach Park twice a week, using his own money. The breakfasts gradually became known as "Fr. Don's Kitchen," inspiring Honolulu area parishes, namely St. Pius X and Sacred Heart, to offer breakfasts to approximately 360 homeless people at parks around the city.

== Last years ==
He moved to an assisted living facility in for elderly Jesuits in Los Gatos, California in 2008. Merrifield died from a heart attack at Good Samaritan Hospital in San Jose, California, on February 25, 2010, at the age of 81.

Academic offices
Preceded by Charles S. Cassassa	President of Loyola Marymount University; 1969–1984	Succeeded by James N. Loughran
