= Thomas P. O'Malley =

American Jesuit and academic

The Reverend Thomas P. O'Malley SJ

13th President of Loyola Marymount University
- In office 1991–1999
- Preceded by: James N. Loughran
- Succeeded by: Robert B. Lawton

President of John Carroll University
- In office 1980–1988
- Preceded by: Henry Birkenhauer
- Succeeded by: Michael Lavelle

Personal details
- Born: March 1, 1930 Milton, Massachusetts
- Died: November 4, 2009 (aged 79) Boston, Massachusetts
- Education: Boston College; Fordham University
- Profession: Jesuit, academic

Thomas P. O'Malley SJ (March 1, 1930 - November 4, 2009) was an American Jesuit and academic. O'Malley was the president of John Carroll University from 1980 until 1988 and Loyola Marymount University from 1991 until 1999. He later became a professor at Boston College after leaving Loyola Marymount in 1999.

== Biography ==
=== Early life and education ===
Thomas O'Malley was born to Irish immigrant parents in Milton, Massachusetts, on March 1, 1930. He received a bachelor's degree in classics from Boston College in 1951 and his master's degree from Fordham University in 1953.

O'Malley entered the Society of Jesus through the Jesuits' former Shadowbrook novitiate in Lenox, Massachusetts. He completed his training at the Catholic University of Leuven in Belgium and was ordained a Jesuit Roman Catholic priest in 1961.

He obtained his doctorate in early Christian theology and literature from Radboud University Nijmegen in the Netherlands, which was known as the Catholic University of Nijmegen at the time.

=== Academia ===
O'Malley became the chairman of the Department of classical languages at Boston College in 1967, and later became the chair of Boston's theology department as well. He was named the dean of Boston College's College of Arts and Sciences in 1973.

O'Malley was appointed the president of John Carroll University, a Jesuit institution in University Heights, Ohio, in 1980. O'Malley oversaw the addition of new endowed chairs and increased the finances of John Carroll's campus ministry programs and scholarships. O'Malley also led the construction of new buildings and residence hall. He remained the president of John Carroll University until 1988.

After his departure from John Carroll University, O'Malley taught in Nigeria for a year. He then became the rector of Fairfield University's Jesuit community in Connecticut.

=== Loyola Marymount University ===
Thomas O'Malley was appointed the 13th President of Loyola Marymount University (LMU) in Westchester, Los Angeles in 1991. He would remain as the head of the university until his retirement in 1999.

He spearheaded a capital improvement fundraising campaign which raised more than $144 million, more than $16 million more than the campaign's intended goal. The goal of O'Malley's fundraiser was to improve existing structure on campus and construct new buildings. The Burns Recreation Center and the Hilton Center for Business were both constructed during his tenure as president. Under O'Malley, new residence halls were also constructed during the 1990s. He also initiated the purchase of the 680,000-square-foot (63,000 m^{2}) former headquarters of Hughes Aircraft in 2000, which was acquired after he had retired as president. The building is now the location of LMU's administration, the School of Education and the College of Liberal Arts.

O'Malley initiated the recruitment of minority faculty members at Loyola Marymount. Loyola Marymount earned a 1998 Theodore M. Hesburgh Award from the American Council on Education for its recruitment efforts.

O'Malley led a number of academic initiatives during his administration. The Leavey Center for the Study of Los Angeles was founded at LMU during O'Malley's time as president. The Leavey Center studies and researches regional issues related to the Los Angeles Metropolitan Area, including local politics, education and immigration.

O'Malley retired as president of Loyola Marymount University in 1999. He was succeeded by Robert B. Lawton, S.J., LMU's 14th president.

=== Later life ===
O'Malley returned to the faculty of Boston College following his departure from Loyola Marymount in 1999. He spent the rest of his life teaching as part of the Boston College arts and sciences honors program.

O'Malley died of a heart attack in Boston, Massachusetts, on November 4, 2009, at the age of 79. He was survived by three brothers and sisters - Mary E. O'Malley, John F. O'Malley and Austin J. O'Malley.

== See also ==
- Presidents of Loyola Marymount University

Academic offices
Preceded by Henry Birkenhauer	President of John Carroll University; 1980–1988	Succeeded by Michael Lavelle
Preceded by James N. Loughran	13 Presidents of Loyola Marymount University; 1991–1999	Succeeded by Robert B. Lawton
