= George Babich =

American basketball player (1918–1984)

Biographical details
- Born: April 24, 1918; New York, New York, U.S.
- Died: July 22, 1984 (aged 66)

Playing career

Football
- 1940–1942: Fordham

Basketball
- 1940–1943: Fordham

Coaching career (HC unless noted)

Basketball
- 1946–1949: Saint Peter's

Head coaching record
- Overall: 39–26

George Michael Babich (April 4, 1918 – July 22, 1984) was an American professional wrestler and college basketball head coach. He had a school hall of fame basketball career at Fordham, but also played for their football team. Babich entered professional wrestling in the 1940s and continued through the 1950s. Between 1946 and 1949 he also served as Saint Peter's basketball head coach.

== Head coaching record ==
Record table
Season	Team	Overall	Conference	Standing	Postseason
Saint Peter's Peacocks (Independent) (1946–1949)
1946–47	Saint Peter's	5–16			
1947–48	Saint Peter's	16–5			
1948–49	Saint Peter's	18–5			
Saint Peter's:		39–26			
Total:		39–26 (.600)			
