= Deborah Feyerick =

American journalist

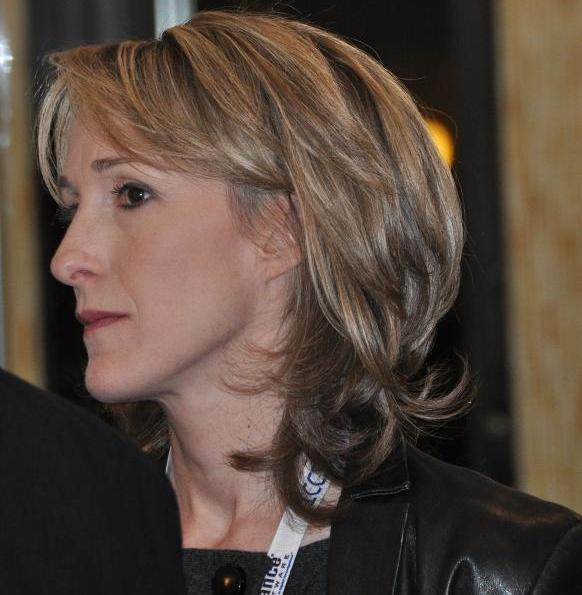
- Feyerick in 2009
- Education: Barnard College (BA)
- Occupation: anchor/reporter
- Known for: CNN reporter and presenter (2000–2017)
- Children: 2

Deborah Feyerick is an American journalist and formerly National Correspondent for CNN and CNN International.

== Early life ==
Deborah Feyerick spent her early childhood in France and UK before moving to the United States. Feyerick grew up in New Jersey and moved to Manhattan to attend Barnard College where she graduated in 1987 with a Bachelor of Arts in English Literature and where she later received the Young Alumna Award. During college Feyerick worked at NBC as a news assistant. After graduation she went to work for Conde Nast as a researcher at GQ Magazine, leaving to travel on her own for a year through Europe, North Africa, Asia Minor, Eastern Europe, the Soviet Union and Middle East.

Feyerick returned in 1990 and soon after moved to London and Norway where she worked for an independent news & video production company funded by Swedish media giant Millicom. She spent weeks living in Gaza and the West Bank while working on a two-part series for the MacNeil/Lehrer NewsHour on Palestinian refugee camps and Israeli settlers.

She returned to Manhattan and worked at Time, Inc as a Special Correspondent for Life magazine covering the Los Angeles Riots, The American Family, and the 50th anniversary of D-Day.

== Career ==
In 1992, Feyerick was among the first group hired for Time Warner start-up NY1 News. She covered entertainment, health and, ultimately, breaking news. She received multiple Emmy nominations for her work covering the AIDS epidemic through the eyes of New York City high school teacher.

In 2000, Feyerick joined CNN as a New York-based correspondent. A year later, she covered the 1998 United States embassy bombings trial of terrorists who reported to Osama Bin Laden and who were ultimately convicted of murder and conspiracy to blow up US Embassies in Kenya and Tanzania. The Federal trial in Manhattan took nearly six months with the verdict coming May 2001. Months later on 9/11 the World Trade Center towers and Pentagon were attacked. Feyerick was at Mayor Rudy Giuliani's makeshift headquarters when he announced thousands had died in the towers, among them 343 New York City firefighters. Her account appears in the book Covering Catastrophe: Broadcast Journalists Report September 11.

During CNN's extensive coverage of the tragedy, Feyerick was on the investigative team breaking news about the hijackers and their US connections in New York, New Jersey, Boston and the Midwest. The team was later recognized with a 2002 National Headliner Award for Outstanding Continuing Coverage of 9/11. She was in court when Zacharias Moussaoui, the so-called 20th hijacker, tried to plead guilty, later reversing his plea in the Eastern District of Virginia. Feyerick also covered the arraignment of American Taliban John Walker Lindh.

In 2002, Feyerick covered the murder trial of Kennedy cousin Michael Skakel, nephew of Ethel Kennedy. Skakel was convicted of the 1975 murder of his neighbor Martha Moxley who was beaten to death with a golf club. Both were 15 at the time of the murder.

Feyerick covered the 2004 Federal trial of Martha Stewart who was found guilty of conspiracy, obstruction of justice and making false statements. Feyerick was on site in West Virginia at Alderson Federal Prison camp when Stewart arrived in the early morning hours of October 8 and when she left six months later on a freezing day in March 2005.

Feyerick's other high-profile CNN trial coverage includes the 2009 Federal death penalty case of US soldier Steven Dale Green in Kentucky; the 2011 Cheshire, CT Home Invasion & Murder trial; and the 2013 Federal murder and racketeering trial of Irish gangster James "Whitey" Bulger in Boston.

Feyerick's in depth reporting includes long-form pieces for CNN Investigations specifically rampant mold at US naval facilities in CNN's "Toxic Homefront"; the incarceration of NYPD transit officer Richard DeGuglielmo Jr. in "Twisted Justice"; and the search for gangster & FBI Most Wanted James "Whitey" Bulger in "Stone Cold Killer."

Feyerick's reputation as an investigative and breaking news reporter has put her on the front-lines of major stories including the devastation of Hurricane Sandy, the Sandy Hook Elementary School shooting, and the manhunt for Tamerlan and Dzhokhar Tsarnaev, the perpetrators of the Boston Marathon bombing.

Feyerick covered the national gun debate, examining the issue from the perspective of gun-owners. She visited rocker and NRA activist Ted Nugent at his Spirit Wild Ranch; interviewed the head of the National Shooting Sports Foundation; and experienced firearms first hand from the perspective of a non-gun-owner.

Feyerick retired from CNN in May 2017.

== Personal life ==
Feyerick is on the board of various charities, including one that helps young girls in India receive a higher education. She resides in New York City with her two children.
