= J. Michael Steele =

American mathematician

John Michael Steele is C.F. Koo Professor of Statistics at the Wharton School of the University of Pennsylvania, and he was previously affiliated with Stanford University, Columbia University and Princeton University.

Steele was elected the 2009 president of the Institute of Mathematical Statistics.

== Awards ==
- Fellow, Institute for Mathematical Statistics, 1984;
- Fellow, American Statistical Association, 1989;
- Frank Wilcoxon Prize, American Society for Quality Control and the American Statistical Association, 1990
- Chauvenet Prize (with Vladimir Pozdnyakov), in 2020, for their paper "Buses, Bullies, and Bijections"

== Books ==
- Steele, J. Michael (2004). The Cauchy-Schwarz master class : an introduction to the art of mathematical inequalities. Cambridge, UK. ISBN 978-0-511-21134-8. OCLC 144618405.
- Steele, J. Michael (2001). Stochastic Calculus and Financial Applications. New York, NY: Springer New York. doi:10.1007/978-1-4684-9305-4. ISBN 978-1-4419-2862-7.
- Steele, J. Michael (1997). Probability theory and combinatorial optimization. Philadelphia. ISBN 0-89871-380-3. OCLC 35331384.
