= Alina Cho =

American journalist

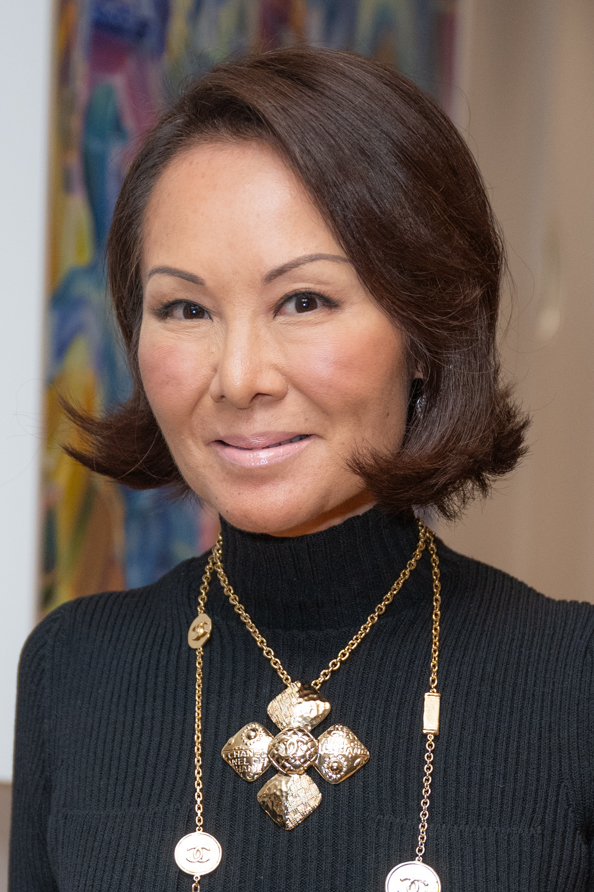
- Born: 1971 (age 54–55); Vancouver, Washington, United States
- Education: Boston College; Medill School of Journalism, Northwestern University
- Occupation: Journalist/Editor

Alina Cho is an American journalist. She was formerly a television correspondent and host of CNN's Fashion: Backstage Pass, and is an Editor at Large at Ballantine Bantam Dell, a division of Penguin Random House. Cho is responsible for developing and co-editing books in the lifestyle and fashion genre. Cho is also the host of a lecture series at The Metropolitan Museum of Art called "The Atelier with Alina Cho".

Cho held various posts at ABC and CNBC. She earned an M.S. from Northwestern University's Medill School of Journalism and a B.A. from Boston College. She lives in Manhattan and Southampton, New York.

Cho was born and raised in Vancouver, Washington.
