= 1991 MAAC men's basketball tournament =

American men's postseason collegiate basketball tournament

- Classification: Division I
- Season: 1990–91
- Teams: 9
- Site: Knickerbocker Arena; Albany, NY
- Champions: Saint Peter's (1st title)
- Winning coach: Ted Fiore (1st title)
- MVP: Marvin Andrews (Saint Peter's)

1990–91 MAAC men's basketball standings
	Conf.				Overall
Team	W		L	PCT	W		L	PCT
Siena	12	–	4	.750	25	–	10	.714
La Salle	12	–	4	.750	19	–	10	.655
Saint Peter's †	11	–	5	.688	24	–	7	.774
Iona	11	–	5	.688	17	–	13	.567
Manhattan	8	–	8	.500	13	–	15	.464
Niagara	6	–	10	.375	8	–	20	.286
Loyola (MD)	5	–	11	.313	12	–	16	.429
Fairfield	4	–	12	.250	8	–	20	.286
Canisius	3	–	13	.188	10	–	19	.345
† 1991 MAAC tournament winner Rankings from AP Poll

The 1991 MAAC men's basketball tournament was held March 1–4 at Knickerbocker Arena in Albany, New York.

Number three seed Saint Peter's defeated Iona in the championship game, 64–58, to win their first MAAC men's basketball tournament.

The Peacocks received an automatic bid to the 1991 NCAA tournament as the No. 12 seed in the Midwest region.

== Format ==
All nine of the conference's members participated in the tournament field. Teams were seeded based on regular season conference records. All games were played at the new Knickerbocker Arena in Albany, New York.

== Bracket ==
First round Friday, March 1
8	Fairfield	54
9	Canisius	61

Quarterfinals; Saturday, March 2
1	Siena	76
9	Canisius	62
4	Iona	69
5	Manhattan	54
3	Saint Peter's	81
6	Niagara	59
7	Loyola (MD)	70
2	La Salle	86

Semifinals; Sunday, March 3
1	Siena	90
4	Iona	95
3	Saint Peter's	57
2	La Salle	50

Championship; Monday, March 4
4	Iona	58
3	Saint Peter's	64
