= Bill Smith (basketball, born 1939) =

American basketball player (1939–2023)

Personal information
- Born: April 26, 1939 Jersey City, New Jersey, U.S.
- Died: September 13, 2023 (aged 84) Lavalette, New Jersey, U.S.
- Listed height: 6 ft 5 in (1.96 m)
- Listed weight: 190 lb (86 kg)

Career information
- High school: New York Military Academy (Cornwall-on-Hudson, New York)
- College: Saint Peter's (1958–1961)
- NBA draft: 1961: 5th round, 42nd overall pick
- Drafted by: New York Knicks
- Position: Shooting guard / small forward
- Number: 16

Career history
- 1961–1962: New York Knicks
- Stats at NBA.com
- Stats at Basketball Reference

William F. Smith (April 26, 1939 – September 13, 2023) was an American basketball player who played briefly in the National Basketball Association (NBA). Smith was drafted with the first pick in the fifth round of the 1961 NBA draft by the New York Knicks. He played in nine games for the Knicks in the 1961-62 NBA season and averaged 2.6 points per game, 0.7 assists per game and 1.8 rebounds per game. Smith died in Lavalette, New Jersey on September 13, 2023, at the age of 84.

== Career statistics ==
Legend
GP	Games played	GS	Games started	MPG	Minutes per game
FG%	Field goal percentage	3P%	3-point field goal percentage	FT%	Free throw percentage
RPG	Rebounds per game	APG	Assists per game	SPG	Steals per game
BPG	Blocks per game	PPG	Points per game	**Bold**	Career high

=== NBA ===
==== Regular season ====
Year	Team	GP	MPG	FG%	FT%	RPG	APG	PPG
1961–62	New York	9	9.2	.242	.875	1.8	.8	2.6
