= Saint Peter's University =

Jesuit college in Jersey City, New Jersey, U.S.

- Former name: Saint Peter's College (1872–2012)
- Motto: Latin: Ad majorem dei gloriam ("For the greater glory of God")
- Type: Private university
- Established: 1872; 154 years ago
- Religious affiliation: Roman Catholic (Jesuit)
- Academic affiliations: AJCU; ACCU; CIC NAICU; Sea-grant
- President: Hubert Benitez
- Faculty: 103 full-time, 240 part-time
- Students: 3,572 (fall 2024)
- Undergraduates: 2,263 (fall 2024)
- Postgraduates: 1,309 (fall 2024)
- Location: Jersey City, New Jersey, United States; 40°43′38″N 74°04′18″W
- Campus: Urban - 30 acres (0.12 km^{2})
- Colors: Dark Blue; Blue
- Nickname: Peacocks
- Sporting affiliations: NCAA Division I – MAAC
- Mascot: Peter the Peacock
- Website: saintpeters.edu

Saint Peter's University is a private Jesuit university in Jersey City, New Jersey, United States. Founded as Saint Peter's College in 1872 by the Society of Jesus, the university offers over 60 undergraduate and graduate programs to more than 3,600 undergraduate and 2,000 graduate students. Its mascot is the peacock and its sports teams play in the Metro Atlantic Athletic Conference, of which it is a founding member.

The university is located on a 30-acre (0.12 km^{2}) campus just south of Journal Square, which is 2 miles (3.2 km) west of Manhattan. Alumni of the university include a Presidential Medal of Freedom recipient, winner of the Pulitzer Prize, a U.S. Senator and members of the U.S. House of Representatives, federal judges, academics, physicians, and CEOs.

== History ==
The college was chartered in 1872 as a liberal arts college for men and enrolled its first students in 1878 at Warren Street, in Jersey City, on the present site of its former high school section, St. Peter's Preparatory School. In September 1918, the college was closed, along with several other Jesuit colleges and high schools, because of declining enrollment in the face of World War I and because the Jesuits concentrated personnel at other colleges on the East Coast. Although the war ended only two months after its closing, and despite clamoring from alumni, it took until 1930 to re-open the college. The college was temporarily located on Newark Avenue, before moving in 1936 to its current location on the former estate of Edward Faitoute Condict Young on Hudson Boluevard (now Kennedy Boulevard), between Montgomery Street and Glenwood Avenue. The first building on constructed on the new campus was Collins Memorial Gymnasium where the Peacocks men's basketball team played most of their home games through the 1950s.

The college was integrated in 1936, when the college admitted its first black student. The college granted an honorary Doctor of Divinity degree to Martin Luther King Jr. in 1965 and was the first Jesuit school to do so.

The college became co-educational in 1966, though women had been admitted to the school's evening program in 1930, and a group of 35 women had been admitted due to low enrollment during World War II.

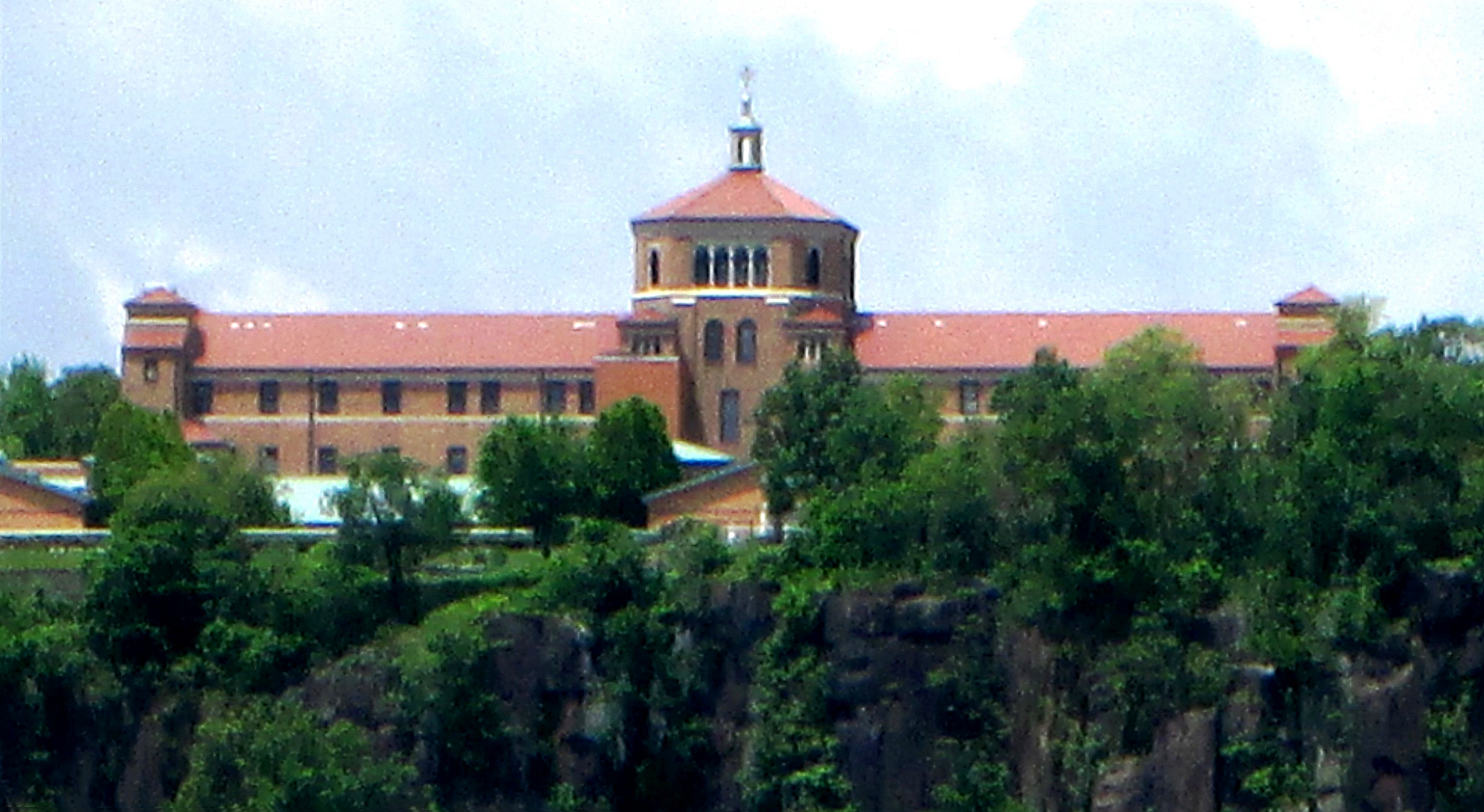
The former Englewood Cliffs campus, as seen from Manhattan

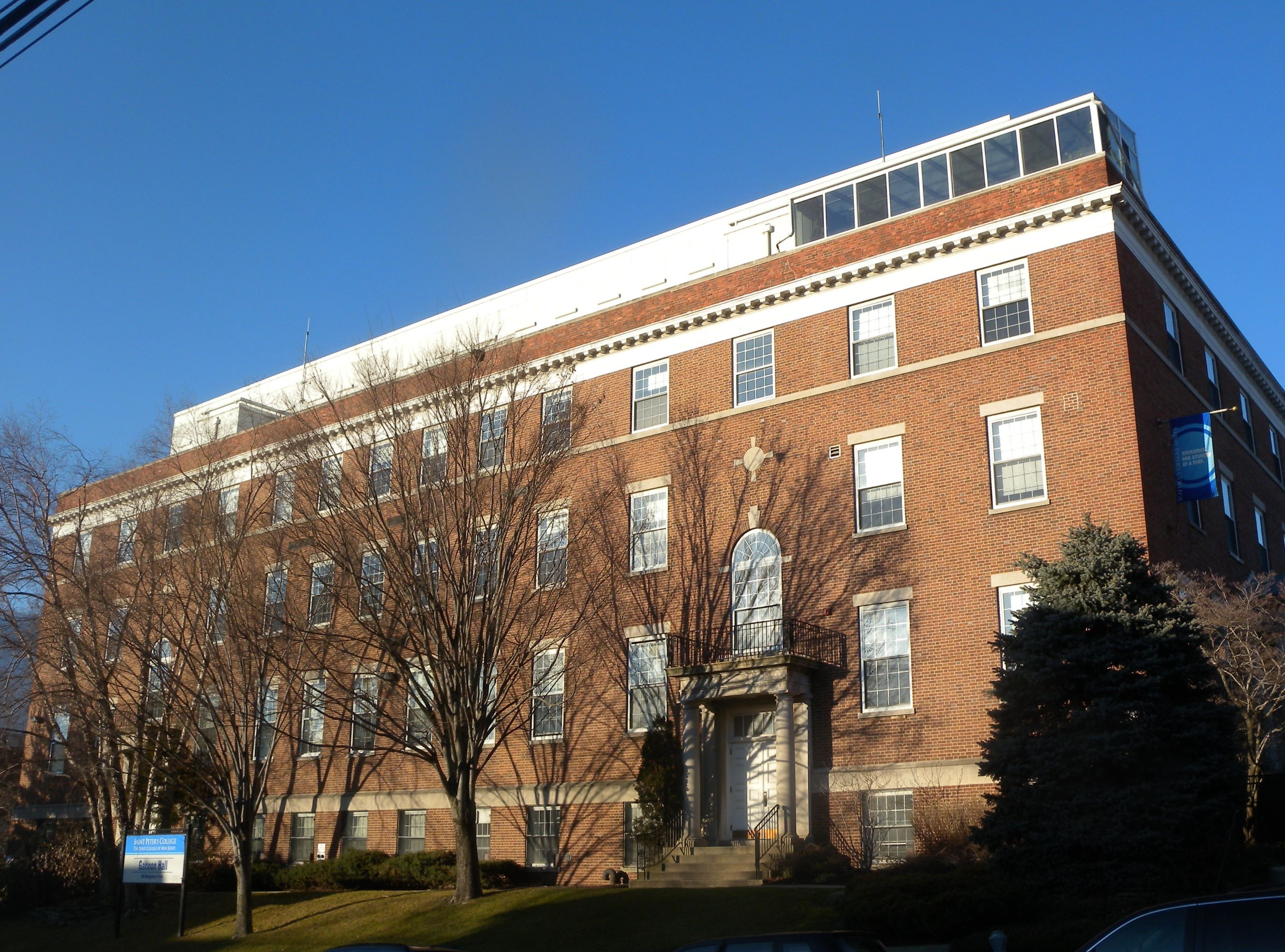
Gannon Hall

The college has made an effort to reach out into the New Jersey suburbs, with a former satellite campus in St. Michael's Villa at Englewood Cliffs opened in 1975 (closed in 2018) and an extension at South Amboy's Cardinal McCarrick High School opened in 2003 but closed when high school closed in 2015.

In 1975, the college constructed the Yanitelli Recreational Life Center sports complex. Beginning with the 1983 acquisition of its first residence hall, the college has converted four apartment buildings to dormitory use, and constructed three new dormitories Whelan Hall (1994), Millennium Hall (1999) and Panepinto Hall (2022).

=== 2000-present ===
In 2000, Gannon Hall, the science building, completed an $8.2 million renovation.

In 2004, the long-awaited pedestrian bridge over Kennedy Boulevard linked the East Campus and the West Campus.

In 2006, the college began a $50 million capital campaign for a new student center.

On December 24, 2006, college president James N. Loughran was found dead in his home. On May 10, 2007, the board of trustees appointed Eugene J. Cornacchia the 22nd President of Saint Peter's College. Cornacchia was the first layperson to serve as president of the 135-year-old Catholic, Jesuit institution. Cornacchia retired in June 2024, and Hubert Benitez was named the 23rd President of Saint Peter's University as of July 1, 2024.

In 2008, Saint Peter's was awarded a $2 million grant from the U.S. Department of Defense to create the Center for Microplasma Science and Technology. This grant allowed the college to expand upon its 20 years of studying microplasma as part of its research on water purifiers in conjunction with United Water. Saint Peter's graduates U.S. Senator Robert Menendez and U.S. Representative Albio Sires helped secure the $2 million grant.

On the day after his narrow defeat in the 2008 New Hampshire Presidential primary election, Democratic presidential candidate Barack Obama held a rally at the college's Yanitelli Center.

In March 2011, it was announced that the college would take over Saint Aeden's Church at McGinley Square from the Archdiocese of Newark.

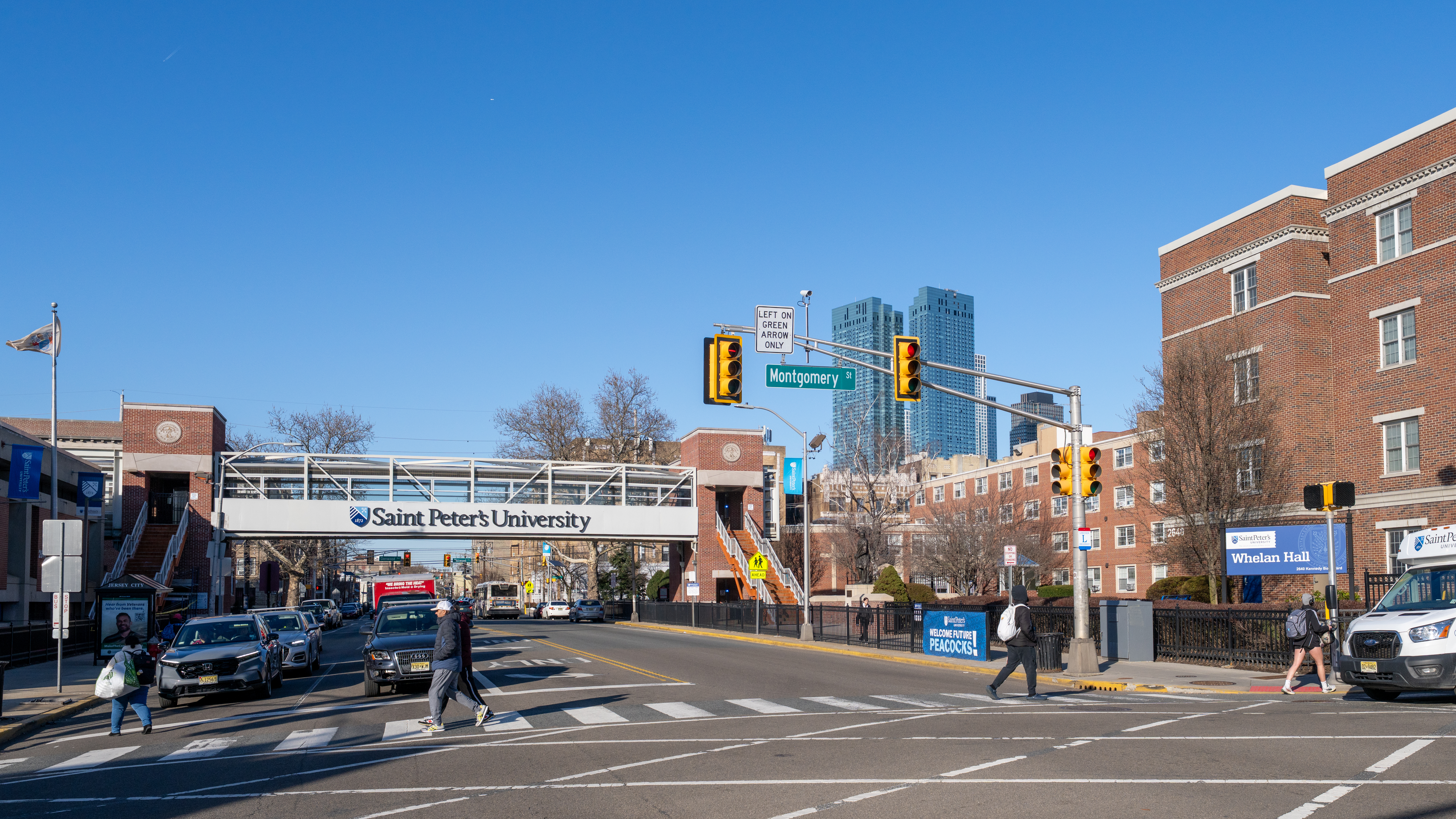
Footbridge over Kennedy Boulevard

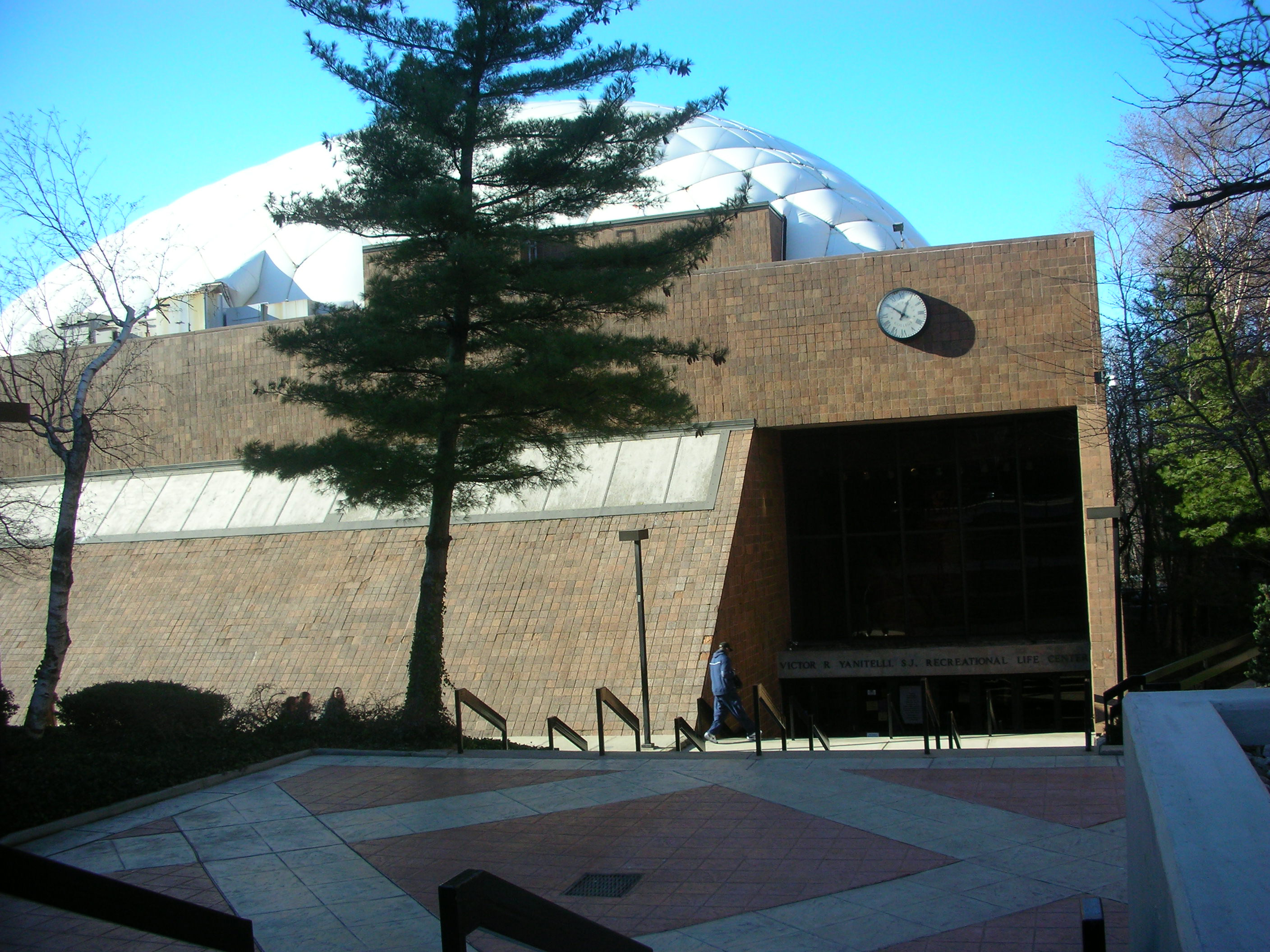
Yanitelli Center, Home of the Peacocks

In March 2012, the college was granted the university designation by the New Jersey State Secretary for Higher Education and would thus change its name. On August 14, 2012, Saint Peter's announced the official change on its website, becoming Saint Peter's University.

In 2013, the new Mac Mahon Student Center was completed. It houses offices for many of Saint Peter's administrative branches, as well as numerous student led organizations such as the Student Government Association.

In 2014, the university opened a center for undocumented students, providing them a safe space and mentoring, a resource library, legal support, and advice for them and their families about deportation defense and immigration issues.

In 2019, the university named its business school for former congressman, lawyer, and businessman Frank J. Guarini who had gifted the university $10 million.

In 2021, the university opened and dedicated the renovated Yanitelli Center, now named Run Baby Run Arena, with a victory over fellow Jersey City school, New Jersey City University, 90–66 in an exhibition game. The renovation was secured through a $5 million lead gift from alumni and former basketball player Thomas P. Mac Mahon. Mac Mahon, a 1968 graduate of Saint Peter's, and a member of the Saint Peter's University Board of Trustees, decided to honor his former 1967–68 teammates by naming the renovated space the "Run Baby Run Arena" after that team's nickname for its high-scoring offense.

The following year, the university opened a new six-story residence hall named Panepinto Hall in honor of alumnus Joseph A. Panepinto on the university's East Campus. In the fall of 2018, Panepinto made a $10 million gift to Saint Peter's, which at the time was the largest single gift in the university's history.

== Academics ==
The university includes the following schools and college:

- Caulfield School of Education
- College of Arts and Sciences
- Frank J. Guarini School of Business
- School of Nursing

The university also has an honors program and a School of Professional Studies for adult-learners providing education in certain concentrations such as in business, education, criminal justice, computer science, and others, allowing enrollment in periodic full-time, part-time, and on-line classes.

The university offers more than 50 areas of study including STEM, business, education, nursing, and humanities and social science liberal arts, with an undergraduate student-to-faculty ratio of 13:1, and over 90% of the faculty holding a doctoral or terminal degree.

=== Undergraduate admissions ===
In 2023, U.S. News & World Report ranked the university undergraduate admissions as selective with the university regarding an applicant's high school GPA a very important admission factor. High school class rank, as available, as well as letters of recommendation, are considered important. Applicants must submit either SAT or ACT scores or submit a test-optional essay. Of admitted applicants, 23% submitted SAT scores and 3% submitted ACT scores. Of those submitting, the middle 50% SAT scores were between 960 and 1150 and the middle 50% ACT scores were between 17 and 28, with 25% of applicants submitting scores achieving scores above, and 25% scoring below, those ranges. The average admitted student had a high school GPA of 3.31, with applicants required to have completed college preparatory high school coursework.

=== Rankings ===
In 2023, U.S. News & World Report ranked the university tied for #58 out of 181 Regional Universities North, #6 in Best Value Schools, and #11 in Top Performers on Social Mobility. Forbes ranked Saint Peter's 282nd out of the top 500 rated private and public colleges and universities in America for the 2024-25 report. Saint Peter's was also ranked 149th among private colleges and 97th in the northeast.

=== Partnerships ===
In 2024, Saint Peter's University established China-US Research Center for a Community with Shared Future in partnership with the Institute for a Community with Shared Future at the Communication University of China.

== Athletics ==
Competing in the Metro Atlantic Athletic Conference (MAAC), the university fields 16 athletic teams. All of the sports teams are now known as the Peacocks. Until recently, the women's teams were known as the Peahens; Saint Peter's is the only NCAA Division I institution with this mascot. The baseball, softball, and soccer teams play at Joseph J. Jaroschak Field, in Lincoln Park. All other teams play at the Victor R. Yanitelli, S.J. Recreational Life Center, located on campus. The school also uses the Jersey City Armory for some events. On June 14, 2007, it was announced that the football team would be disbanded.

Basketball has long been the most popular sport at the university. Under head coach Don Kennedy, the men's team gained national attention by defeating heavily favored and nationally ranked Duke University in the 1968 NIT quarterfinals, en route to a fourth-place finish.

Saint Peter's has won the MAAC men's basketball championship and the accompanying automatic bid to the NCAA tournament five times (1991, 1995, 2011, 2022, and 2024). They have appeared in the National Invitation Tournament (NIT) 12 times (1957, 1958, 1967, 1968, 1969, 1975, 1976, 1980, 1982, 1984, 1987, and 1989). The women's basketball team has won seven MAAC championships and automatic bids to the NCAA tournament (1982, 1992, 1993, 1997, 1999, 2000, and 2002); it also won the MAAC championship in 1983 and 1984, years when the MAAC champion did not receive an automatic NCAA tournament berth. In 2017, Saint Peter's won the CollegeInsider.com Postseason Tournament (CIT) championship by defeating Texas A&M-Corpus Christi in the tournament final. It was Saint Peter's first national title in school history. In 2022, the men's basketball team earned national recognition after receiving a No. 15 seed in the NCAA tournament and upsetting the No. 2 seed Kentucky Wildcats; it was only the tenth occurrence of a No. 15 seed defeating a No. 2 seed in NCAA Tournament history. They then defeated the No. 7 seed Murray State Racers, becoming just the third No. 15 seed to reach the Sweet 16. After this they upset the No. 3 seed Purdue Boilermakers to become the first No. 15 seed to reach the Elite 8.

In 2004 and 2005, Keydren "Kee-Kee" Clark led the nation in points scored per game, becoming just the eighth player to repeat as NCAA Division I scoring champion. On March 4, 2006, Clark became only the seventh NCAA player to score more than 3,000 points in his career; on the next day, he passed Hersey Hawkins to become the sixth-leading scorer of all time. At the time of his final game on March 6, 2006, Clark held the NCAA all-time record for 3-point shots, with 435. A second fourth-year student and a forward on the basketball team, George Jefferson, died on June 21, 2005, due to a previously undiagnosed heart condition. In 2011, Saint Peter's won the MAAC tournament to make the Peacocks' first March Madness appearance since 1995.

The Peacocks were the MAAC Men's Golf Champions in 2014, 2015, and 2017.

The Peacocks were the MAAC Men's Soccer Champions in 2003 and 2010. The team were finalists in 2006 and 2007.

The women's bowling team won its first championship title in 2009.

The Peacocks were the MAAC Women's Indoor Track and Field Champions in 2011, 2012, and 2013. They were Outdoor champions in 2011 and 2012.

== Peacock mascot ==
Saint Peter's University is the only NCAA Division I institution whose mascot is the peacock. This choice was made for several reasons. Primarily, the land on which Saint Peter's now stands was once owned by a man named Michiel Reyniersz Pauw, whose last name means "peacock" in Dutch. His extensive holdings included most of Hudson County and were part of the Pavonia, New Netherland settlement.

In pagan mythology, the peacock is considered to be a symbol of rebirth, much like the phoenix. For Saint Peter's, it is a reference to the closing and reopening of the college in the early 20th century.

At one point in the 1960s, live peacocks roamed the campus. Many institutions within the college derive their name from the peacock:

- The school newspaper had been titled the Pauw Wow until April 2021, when it was renamed as the St. Peter's Tribune; Pauw's name was removed because of his involvement in "cruelty and oppression against Indigenous and African peoples".
- The literary magazine is titled the Pavan.
- The school's yearbook is titled the Peacock Pie.
- The drama society calls itself Argus Eyes, in reference to Argus Panoptes, who, according to Greek mythology, had his 100 eyes preserved by Hera in the tail of the peacock.
- One of the major dining facilities is named the Pavonia Room.
- The O'Toole Library café is named Pavo Perk.

== Notable alumni ==
Notable alumni include:

- In the fields of arts and entertainment, Saint Peter's graduates include: Will Durant, 1968 Pulitzer Prize for General Nonfiction and the 1977 Presidential Medal of Freedom recipient; Ken Jennings, 1979 Drama Desk Award for Outstanding Featured Actor in a Musical recipient; Mary Ann McGuigan, 1997 National Book Award finalist; and Angela Shapiro-Mathes, President of Fox Television Studios and TLC.
- In the field of business, Saint Peter's graduates include: Lawrence R. Codey, President & COO of Public Service Electric & Gas; Thomas P. Mac Mahon, President & CEO, LabCorp; William J. Marino, President & CEO, Horizon Blue Cross and Blue Shield of New Jersey; James Meister, President & CEO of Kings Super Markets; and Anthony P. Terracciano, Chairman of Sallie Mae.
- In the field of government, Saint Peter's graduates include: Robert Menendez, United States Senator from New Jersey; Mark McNulty, a Delaware Secretary of Transportation, Robert J. Morris, anti-communist activist and chief counsel to the United States Senate Subcommittee on Internal Security from 1951 to 1953; Thomas F. X. Smith, 38th Mayor of Jersey City, New Jersey; Joseph Patrick Tumulty, Chief of Staff to President Woodrow Wilson; and United States Representatives Daniel J. Griffin, James A. Hamill, Edward J. Hart, Charles F. X. O'Brien, and Albio Sires.
- In the field of law, Saint Peter's graduates include: Thomas Francis Meaney and Peter G. Sheridan, Judges for the United States District Court for the District of New Jersey; Reginald Stanton '56, Judge of the New Jersey Superior Court and Saint Peter's first and only Rhodes Scholar; Chester J. Straub, Senior Circuit Judge of the United States Court of Appeals for the Second Circuit; Joseph R. Quinn, Chief Justice of the Colorado Supreme Court.
- In the field of sports, Saint Peter's graduates include: Keydren Clark, Two-time NCAA basketball scoring champion and seventh all-time leading scorer in NCAA history; Bob Hurley, Naismith Memorial Basketball Hall of Fame basketball coach at St. Anthony High School in Jersey City, New Jersey; Richard Rinaldi, NBA player for the Baltimore Bullets and New York Nets, who, as a senior, averaged 28.6 ppg for the Peacocks; and MLB relief pitchers Frank Brooks and Víctor Santos.
- Other notable Saint Peter's graduates include: George J. Borjas, the Robert W. Scrivner Professor of Economics and Social Policy at the Harvard Kennedy School; Nicholas J. Cifarelli, physician known for starting the first Bioethics Advisory Committee in the United States; John Henning, award-winning TV and radio news reporter in Boston, Massachusetts; and Joseph McGinn, pioneer of minimally invasive cardiac bypass surgery and medical director of The Heart Institute of New York, and historian Will Durant, co-author with wife Ariel Durant of The Story of Civilization.
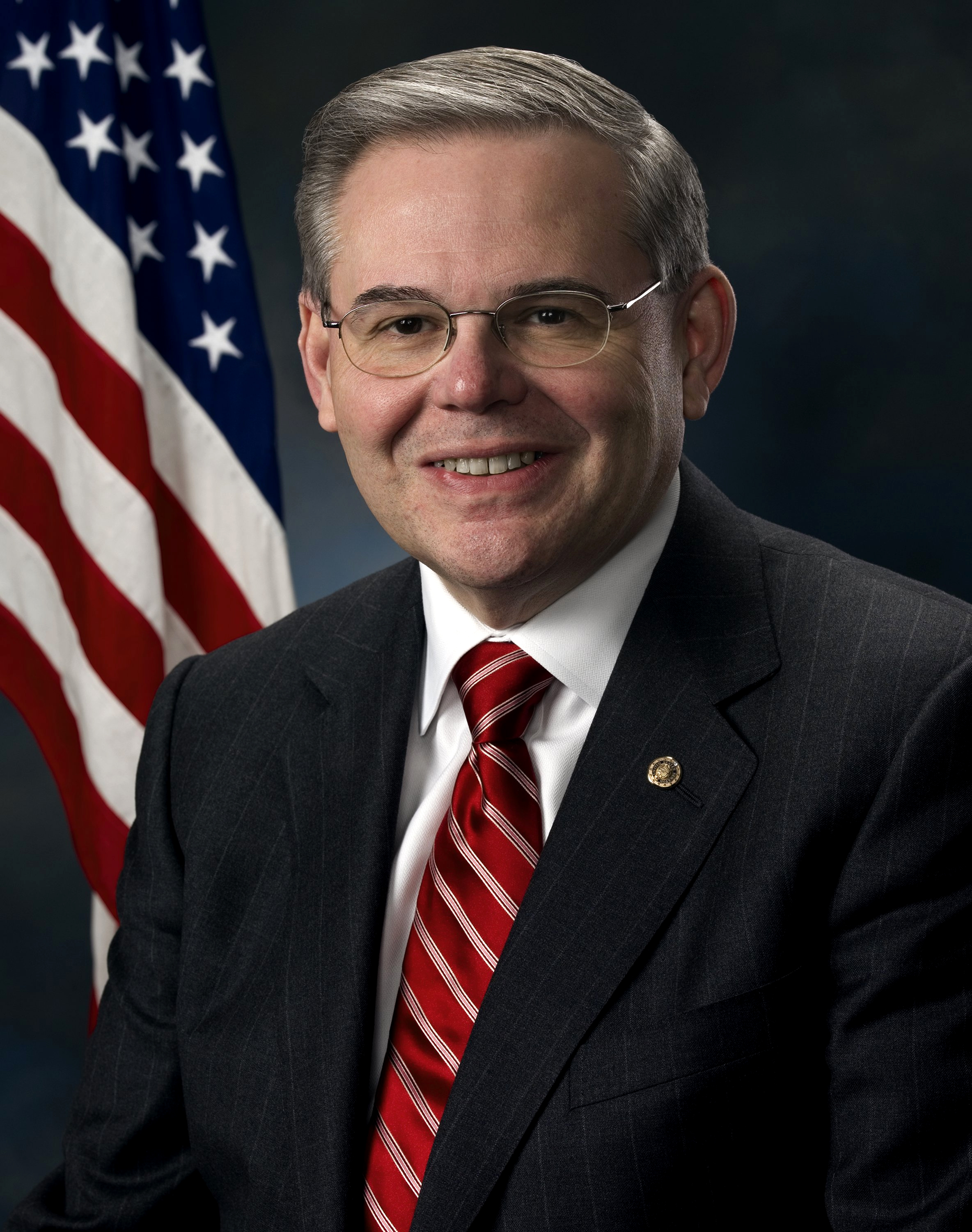
Bob Menendez,
United States Senator, New Jersey

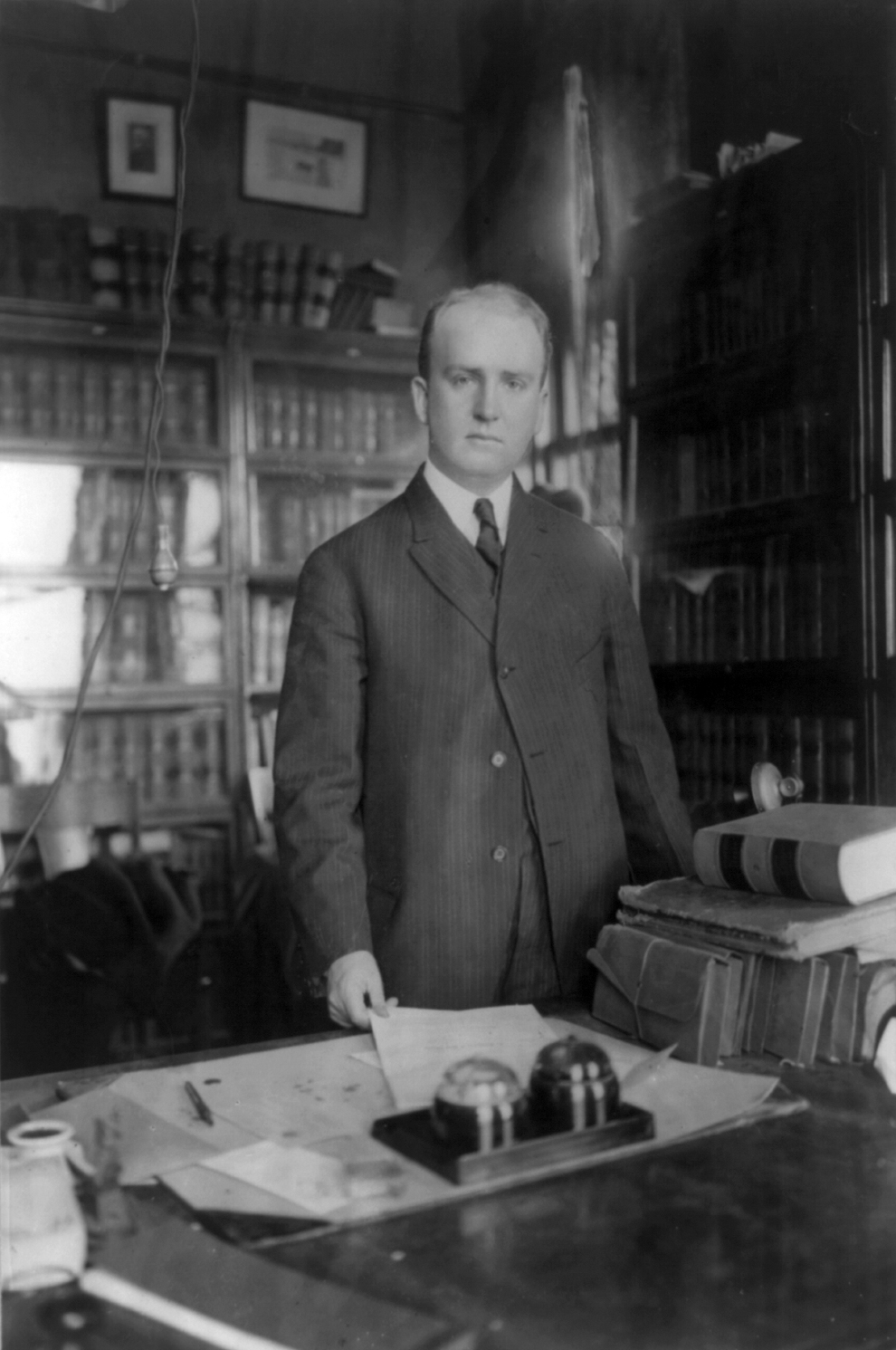
Joseph Patrick Tumulty,
White House Chief of Staff to Woodrow Wilson

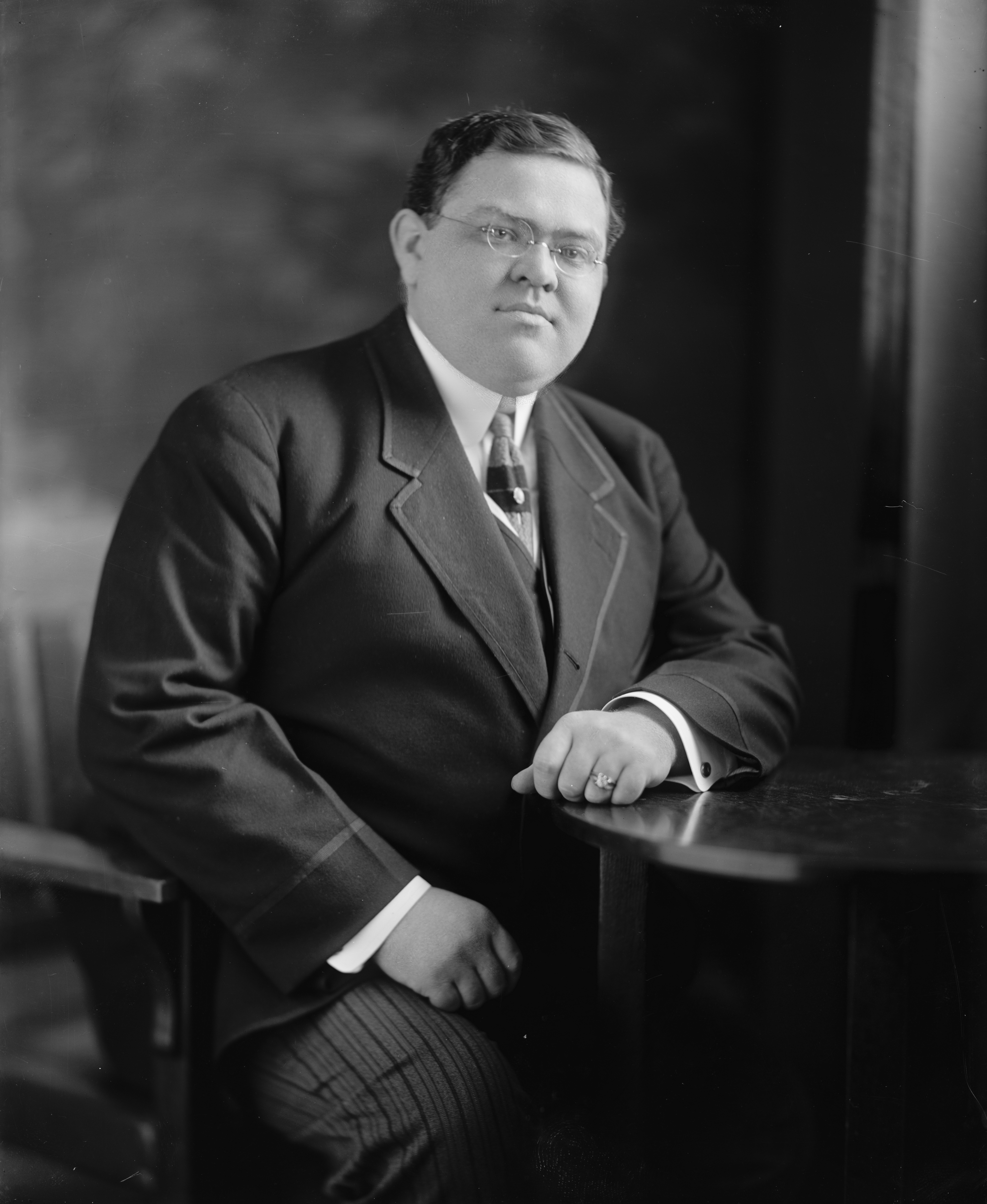
Daniel J. Griffin,
U.S. Representative,
New York

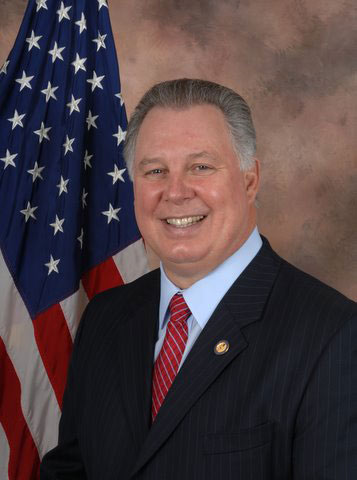
Albio Sires,
U.S. Representative,
New Jersey's 13th congressional district

== See also ==
- List of Jesuit sites
