= Paul Bédard =

Canadian judge

Tax Court of Canada
- Incumbent
- Assumed office June 19, 2003

Personal details
- Education: Université de Sherbrooke

Paul Bédard is a judge who served on the Tax Court of Canada.
