= Rich Rinaldi =

American basketball player

Personal information
- Born: August 3, 1949 (age 77) Poughkeepsie, New York, U.S.
- Listed height: 6 ft 3 in (1.91 m)
- Listed weight: 195 lb (88 kg)

Career information
- High school: Franklin Delano Roosevelt (Hyde Park, New York)
- College: Saint Peter's (1968–1971)
- NBA draft: 1971: 3rd round, 43rd overall pick
- Drafted by: Baltimore Bullets
- Playing career: 1971–1974
- Position: Shooting guard
- Number: 33, 22

Career history
- 1971–1973: Baltimore / Capital Bullets
- 1973–1974: New York Nets
- ?–?: Pallacanestro Bellinzona

Career NBA and ABA statistics
- Points: 405 (4.8 ppg)
- Rebounds: 98 (1.2 rpg)
- Assists: 74 (0.9 bpg)
- Stats at NBA.com
- Stats at Basketball Reference

Richard P. Rinaldi (born August 3, 1949) is an American former professional basketball player who played for the Baltimore Bullets.

Born in Poughkeepsie, New York, Rinaldi attended F.D. Roosevelt High School in Hyde Park, New York and was a guard at St. Peter's College, where he played from 1967 to 1971. As a senior at St. Peter's in 1970–71, Rinaldi averaged 28.6 points per game, which was the nation's sixth-highest scoring average that season.

Rinaldi was selected 43rd overall by the Baltimore Bullets in the 1971 NBA draft and signed a contract which earned him $33,000 as a rookie (equivalent to $262,300 in 2025). He played in the NBA with the Bullets from 1971 to 1974. After being cut by the Bullets during the 1973–1974 season in favor of Flynn Robinson and Archie Clark, Rinaldi signed with the New York Nets of the American Basketball Association in November 1973.

After the Nets also released him, he began working in New York as a substitute teacher and then a full time physical education teacher. In 1976, he was invited to play for an American team including Robert Parrish for a tournament in Italy. The strength of his performance earned him a two-year contract with Italian club Mobilgirgi Varese.

Rinaldi's most successful NBA season came in 1972–73, when he averaged 8.5 points and 2.1 rebounds in 33 games for the Bullets. He ended his professional career in Europe, playing in Italy and Switzerland from 1976 to 1982.

In 1978, he described the quality of play in the Swiss Basketball League as "between high school seniors and college freshmen." In 1980, he won his third straight scoring title in the Swiss Basketball League while playing for Pallacanestro Bellinzona. He averaged 40.4 points per game over 22 games.

After his playing career, Rinaldi served as a men's college basketball coach in his home county at Dutchess Community College and Vassar College.

Despite his having written a guest article in the Poughkeepsie Journal in 1987 arguing that a "[s]trike by [the] NBA players union would be difficult to justify" because "you can never recoup that lost money," the National Basketball Players Association (NBPA) hired Rinaldi in 2001 to serve as an educational counselor for NBA players. He called the job "the best thing to happen to me professionally" since his playing career. At the time, he was living in Skippack, Pennsylvania. As of 2017, Rinaldi worked for the NBPA, counseling players on the transition to post-basketball careers.

== Career statistics ==
Legend
GP	Games played	GS	Games started	MPG	Minutes per game
FG%	Field goal percentage	3P%	3-point field goal percentage	FT%	Free throw percentage
RPG	Rebounds per game	APG	Assists per game	SPG	Steals per game
BPG	Blocks per game	PPG	Points per game	**Bold**	Career high

=== NBA/ABA ===
==== Regular season ====
Year	Team	GP	MPG	FG%	3P%	FT%	RPG	APG	SPG	BPG	PPG
1971–72	Baltimore (NBA)	**39**	4.1	.404		.667	.5	.4			2.7
1972–73	Baltimore (NBA)	33	**19.6**	**.408**		.750	**2.1**	**1.5**			**8.5**
1973–74	Capital (NBA)	7	6.9	.136		.750	1.0	1.4	**.4**	**.1**	1.3
1973–74	N.Y. Nets (ABA)	5	5.6	.286	.000	**1.000**	1.0	.2	**.4**	.0	2.4
Career (NBA)		79	10.8	.393		.724	1.2	.9	.4	.1	5.0
Career (overall)		84	10.5	.389	.000	.735	1.2	.9	.4	.1	4.8

==== Playoffs ====
Year	Team	GP	MPG	FG%	FT%	RPG	APG	PPG
1972	Baltimore (NBA)	3	2.0	.500	–	.0	.3	.7
