= Jimmy Loughran =

English footballer

Personal information
- Full name: James Loughran
- Date of birth: 10 September 1897
- Place of birth: Seaham, England
- Date of death: 25 October 1970 (aged 73)
- Height: 5 ft 9 in (1.75 m)
- Positions: Centre half; wing half

Senior career*
| Years | Team | Apps | (Gls) |
| ?–1922 | Easington Colliery | ? | (?) |
| 1922–1924 | Hull City | 4 | (0) |
| 1924–1925 | Barrow | 24 | (1) |
| 1925–1929 | York City | 96 | (12) |
| 1929–1930 | Newark Town | ? | (?) |
| 1931 | York City | 1 | (0) |
| 1931–? | Goole Town | ? | (?) |
| | Fulford United | ? | (?) |
- * Club domestic league appearances and goals

James Loughran (10 September 1897 – 25 October 1970) was an English footballer.

Loughran played for Easington Colliery, Hull City, Barrow, York City, Newark Town, Goole Town and Fulford United.
