= James N. Loughran =

American academic administrator

The Reverend James N. Loughran SJ

12th President of Loyola Marymount University
- In office 1984–1991
- Preceded by: Donald P. Merrifield
- Succeeded by: Thomas P. O'Malley

President of Saint Peter's College
- In office 1995–2007
- Preceded by: Daniel A. Degnan, S. J.
- Succeeded by: Eugene J. Cornacchia, Ph.D.

Personal details
- Born: March 22, 1940 Brooklyn, New York, U.S.
- Died: December 24, 2006 (aged 66) Jersey City, New Jersey, U.S.
- Education: College of the Holy Cross; Fordham University; Woodstock College
- Profession: Jesuit, Administrator

James N. Loughran SJ (March 22, 1940 – December 24, 2006) was an American Jesuit who served as the 12th president of Loyola Marymount University and 21st president of Saint Peter's College.

== Biography ==
=== Early life ===
Loughran was born in Brooklyn, New York on March 22, 1940. He graduated from Brooklyn Prep in 1957 and entered the Society of Jesus in July 1958. Loughran attended the College of the Holy Cross and graduated from Fordham University, earning a Bachelor's degree in history, summa cum laude, in 1964. He also earned a Master's degree and a Doctorate in Philosophy from Fordham University and studied Theology in France and at Woodstock College in New York. He was ordained on June 11, 1970 and took his final vows on December 8, 1978.

=== Academic career ===
While president of LMU, Loughran directed considerable financial resources to academics and lowered the minimum course load for professors from four to three, freeing up faculty for research and other scholarly and creative pursuits. He established classes in the study of American cultures, in part to raise awareness of the school's minority students who were pushing for greater recognition. He was president in 1990 when one of Loyola Marymount's top basketball players, Hank Gathers, collapsed during a game and died. Gathers' family brought a wrongful-death suit against Loyola Marymount that the school settled for $545,000. Loughran raised the university's endowment from about $21 million to $106 million before he resigned unexpectedly in 1991.

In February 1990, Loughran denied university recognition to a fledgling gay and lesbian student organization, the Alliance of Gays and Lesbians - Loyola Marymount University (AGL-LMU), despite the group's support from both the student and faculty senates and in disregard of the fact that its charter did not violate Catholic teachings. At the time of Loughran's decision, there was already a formally recognized gay and lesbian student group at Loyola Law School, which is part of Loyola Marymount University, though on a separate campus. Loughran's actions set off a contentious debate among students, faculty and staff. The organization struggled after its founding president graduated, though it survives in some form as of 2011.

In addition to his leadership positions at LMU and St Peter's, Loughran served as acting president of Brooklyn College in 1992, interim president of Mount St. Mary's College in Emmittsburg, Maryland, from 1993–94 and dean of Fordham College in New York. Fr. Loughran was an Associate Professor of Philosophy at Fordham from 1974–1984 and held the Edmund Miller, S.J., Philosophy Professorship at John Carroll University in Cleveland, Ohio from 1992-1993. Prior to returning to Saint Peter's as President, Loughran was Interim Vice President for Academic Affairs and Interim Dean of the Arts and Sciences faculty at Fordham.

Academic offices
| Preceded by Daniel A. Degnan | President of Saint Peter's College; 1995–2007 | Succeeded by Eugene J. Cornacchia |
| Preceded by Donald P. Merrifield | 12th Presidents of Loyola Marymount University; 1984–1991 | Succeeded by Thomas P. O'Malley |
