= Keydren Clark =

American basketball player (born 1984)

Saint Peter's Peacocks
- Title: Assistant coach
- League: MAAC

Personal information
- Born: October 8, 1984 (age 42) Tuscaloosa, Alabama, U.S.
- Listed height: 5 ft 10 in (1.78 m)
- Listed weight: 185 lb (84 kg)

Career information
- High school: Rice (New York City, New York)
- College: Saint Peter's (2002–2006)
- NBA draft: 2006: undrafted
- Playing career: 2006–2018
- Position: Point guard
- Coaching career: 2022–present

Career history
- 2006–2007: Aigaleo
- 2007–2008: Scavolini Pesaro
- 2008–2010: Aris Thessaloniki
- 2010–2013: Umana Venezia Reyer
- 2013–2014: Cimberio Varese
- 2014: JSF Nanterre
- 2014–2015: SLUC Nancy
- 2015–2016: Acıbadem Üniversitesi
- 2016–2017: Promitheas Patras
- 2017–2018: Peristeri
- 2018: Orléans Loiret
- 2018: Peristeri

Career highlights
- Greek League Top Scorer (2007); All-Greek League Second Team (2007); Greek 2nd Division champion (2018); Greek 2nd Division MVP (2018); 2× NCAA scoring champion (2004, 2005); Haggerty Award (2005); MAAC Player of the Year (2006); 3× First-team All-MAAC (2004–2006); Second-team All-MAAC (2003); MAAC Rookie of the Year (2003)

Keydren "Kee-Kee" Clark (born October 8, 1984) is an American-Bulgarian basketball coach and former player who is currently an assistant coach at his alma mater, Saint Peter's University. He also holds Bulgarian citizenship.

== College career ==
Clark was one of the most prolific scorers in NCAA Division I history, amassing 3,058 points and averaging 25.9 points per game for his college basketball career. Not heavily recruited from a Rice High School team in New York City, that featured four Division I-bound seniors, Clark became one of the shortest players ever to lead the Division I in scoring, at 5 ft 11 (1.80 m), doing so twice.

A point guard at Saint Peter's College from 2002 to 2006, Clark scored 435 three-pointers in his college career, briefly holding the record for the most three-point shots made in NCAA history, during the end of his senior season. Clark finished as the career leader at the end of the 2006 MAAC tournament, but was soon passed by JJ Redick, who held the NCAA record for three-point field goals made with 457, until 2014, when Oakland's Travis Bader (461+) surpassed him.

Clark finished his career as number six on the list of all-time NCAA scoring leaders. At the time, Clark, along with Pete Maravich of LSU (3,667), Freeman Williams of Portland State (3,249), Lionel Simmons of La Salle (3,217), Alphonso Ford of Mississippi Valley State (3,165), Harry Kelly of Texas Southern (3,066), Hersey Hawkins of Bradley (3,008), and Doug McDermott of Creighton, were the only eight players to score over 3,000 points in their college careers.

In 2003, he averaged 24.9 points per game, leading all freshmen in Division I. In 2004, he averaged 26.7 points per game, and in 2005, he averaged 25.8 points per game; Clark led the nation in points scored per game, becoming just the eighth player to repeat as NCAA Division I scoring champion. He also was one of the Division I steals leaders, with 3.3 per game. He is the all-time leading scorer in Saint Peter's College and New Jersey collegiate history. Clark led the MAAC in scoring for all four seasons. He is also the all-time leader in steals and three-point field goals for the Peacocks. Lionel Simmons and La Salle were a part of the MAAC when he scored his 3,217 points.

== Professional career ==
In July 2006, he joined the recently promoted Greek League club Aigaleo. On July 19, 2007, he signed a contract with the Italian League club Scavolini Pesaro. In June 2008, he signed a contract with the Greek club Aris Thessaloniki. In June 2010, he signed a contract with the Italian League club Umana Venezia Reyer. In July 2013, he signed with Cimberio Varese. He parted ways with Varese on April 3, 2014.

In September 2014, he signed a short-term deal with the French club JSF Nanterre, to replace injured T.J. Campbell. After Campbell returned, Clark left Nanterre. On December 24, 2014, he signed with SLUC Nancy for the rest of the season.

On July 26, 2015, Clark signed with Acıbadem Üniversitesi of the Turkish Second Division.

On August 6, 2017, Clark signed with Peristeri of the Greek 2nd Division. Clark won the 2017–18 Greek A2 Basket League with Peristeri On July 2, 2018, Clark officially re-signed with the Greek team for another season, after a brief stint with Orléans Loiret in France.

== Coaching career ==
After his playing career concluded, Clark returned to Saint Peter's as an assistant coach in 2022.

== See also ==
- List of NCAA Division I men's basketball career scoring leaders
- List of NCAA Division I men's basketball career 3-point scoring leaders
