= List of CNN personnel =

The following is a list of notable current and past news anchors, correspondents, hosts, regular contributors and meteorologists from the CNN, CNN International and HLN news networks.

== Executives ==
- Ken Jautz — Executive Vice President of CNN, responsible for CNN/US
- Amy Entelis — Executive Vice President for talent and content development of CNN Worldwide
- Rachel Smolkin — Vice President and Executive Editor of CNN Politics
- Mark Thompson — Chairman and CEO of CNN Worldwide

== Former executives ==
- Allison Gollust – Chief marketing officer of CNN Worldwide
- Tony Maddox – Executive Vice President and Managing Director of CNN International
- Andrew Morse – Executive Vice President & General Manager of CNN Digital Worldwide
- John Stankey – CEO, WarnerMedia
- Jeff Zucker – President of CNN Worldwide
- Tom Johnson - President of CNN Worldwide

== Hosts and anchors ==
=== Weekdays ===
- Dana Bash — Inside Politics (weekday edition)
- John Berman — CNN News Central (with Kate Bolduan and Sara Sidner)
- Wolf Blitzer — The Situation Room with Wolf Blitzer and Pamela Brown
- Kate Bolduan — CNN News Central (with John Berman and Sara Sidner)
- Pamela Brown — The Situation Room with Wolf Blitzer and Pamela Brown
- Erin Burnett — Erin Burnett OutFront
- Kasie Hunt — The Arena with Kasie Hunt
- Abby Phillip — CNN NewsNight
- Kaitlan Collins — The Source with Kaitlan Collins
- Anderson Cooper — Anderson Cooper 360°
- Laura Coates — Laura Coates Live
- Audie Cornish — CNN This Morning with Audie Cornish
- Brianna Keilar — CNN News Central (with Boris Sanchez)
- Sara Sidner — CNN News Central (with Kate Bolduan and John Berman)
- Jake Tapper — The Lead with Jake Tapper
- Elex Michaelson - The Story Is with Elex Michaelson

=== Weekend ===
Saturday and Sunday

- Victor Blackwell – CNN This Morning Weekend
- Fredricka Whitfield — CNN Newsroom

Saturday

- Michael Smerconish — Smerconish
- Victor Blackwell — First of All
- Christiane Amanpour — The Amanpour Hour

Sunday

- Dana Bash – State of the Union with Dana Bash (alternating with Jake Tapper)
- Anderson Cooper – The Whole Story
- Manu Raju - Inside Politics (weekend edition)
- Jake Tapper — State of the Union with Jake Tapper (alternating with Dana Bash)
- Fareed Zakaria — Fareed Zakaria GPS

=== CNN International ===
- Christiane Amanpour — Amanpour (Chief International Anchor)
- Becky Anderson — Connect the World (CNN Abu Dhabi)
- Zain Asher — One World with Zain Asher
- Jim Sciutto — The Brief with Jim Sciutto

== Current personalities ==
- Maribel Aber (CNN)
- Christiane Amanpour (CNN International)
- David A. Andelman (CNN)
- Becky Anderson (CNN International)
- Desi Anwar (CNN Indonesia)
- Zain Asher (CNN)
- David Axelrod (CNN)
- Robert Baer (CNN)
- Dana Bash (CNN)
- Nada Bashir (CNN International)
- Paul Begala (CNN)
- Peter Bergen (CNN/CNN International)
- John Berman (CNN)
- Carl Bernstein (CNN)
- Natasha Bertrand (CNN)
- Joan Biskupic (CNN)
- Phil Black (CNN/CNN International)
- Victor Blackwell (CNN)
- Wolf Blitzer (CNN)
- Kate Bolduan (CNN)
- Max Boot (CNN)
- Pamela Brown (CNN)
- Ron Brownstein (CNN)
- Kim Brunhuber (CNN/CNN International)
- Erin Burnett (CNN)
- Josh Campbell (CNN)
- Maria Cardona (CNN/CNN en Espanol)
- Jason Carroll (CNN)
- Jean Casarez (CNN)
- David Chalian (CNN)
- Matthew Chance (CNN/CNN International)
- Lanhee Chen (CNN)
- Rosemary Church (CNN International)
- Laura Coates (CNN)
- Kaitlan Collins (CNN)
- Anderson Cooper (CNN; also at CBS News)
- Ahmet Hakan Coskun (CNNTurk)
- S. E. Cupp (CNN)
- Daniel Dale (CNN)
- Amanda Davies (CNN International)
- Jeremy Diamond (CNN)
- Kimberly Dozier (CNN)
- Stephanie Elam (CNN)
- Nima Elbagir (CNN International)
- Harry Enten (CNN)
- Ben Ferguson (CNN)
- Karen Finney (CNN)
- Tom Foreman (CNN)
- Max Foster (CNN International)
- Gabriela Frias (CNN en Español)
- David Frum (CNN)
- Scott Galloway (CNN)
- Jamie Gangel (CNN)
- Alexis Glick (CNN)
- Hadas Gold (CNN/CNN International)
- David Gregory (CNN)
- Sanjay Gupta (CNN)
- Maggie Haberman (CNN)
- Paula Hancocks (CNN/CNN International)
- Nia-Malika Henderson (CNN)
- Erica Hill (CNN)
- Elie Honig (CNN)
- Margaret Hoover (CNN)
- Kasie Hunt (CNN)
- Ben Hunte (CNN)
- Omar Jimenez (CNN)
- Doug Jones (CNN)
- Van Jones (CNN)
- Nefise Karatay (CNNTurk)
- Randi Kaye (CNN)
- Brianna Keilar (CNN)
- John King (CNN)
- Lynda Kinkade (CNN International)
- Nicholas Kristof (CNN)
- Jackie Kucinich (CNN)
- Kyung Lah (CNN International)
- Christopher Lamb (CNN International)
- MJ Lee (CNN)
- Oren Liebermann (CNN International)
- Errol Louis (CNN)
- Kevin Madden (CNN)
- Larry Madowo (CNN International)
- Phil Mattingly (CNN)
- John Miller (CNN)
- Chad Myers (CNN)
- Tim Naftali (CNN)
- Ana Navarro (CNN), (CNN en Español)
- Paula Newton (CNN/CNN International)
- Reena Ninan (CNN)
- Miles O'Brien (CNN)
- Donie O'Sullivan (CNN)
- Toluse Olorunnipa (CNN)
- Elizabeth Perez (CNN/CNN en Español/CNN International)
- Dan Pfeiffer (CNN)
- Abby Phillip (CNN)
- Frederik Pleitgen (CNN International)
- Mark Preston (CNN/CNN International)
- Shimon Prokupecz (CNN/CNN International)
- Richard Quest (CNN International)
- Manu Raju (CNN)
- Charles H. Ramsey (CNN)
- Elle Reeve (CNN)
- David Remnick (CNN)
- Don Riddell (CNN International)
- Nic Robertson (CNN/CNN International)
- Jennifer Rodgers (CNN)
- Hilary Rosen (CNN)
- Richard Roth (CNN/CNN International)
- Jim Sciutto (CNN)
- Bakari Sellers (CNN)
- Sara Sidner (CNN)
- Jamal Simmons (CNN)
- Michael Smerconish (CNN)
- Rachel Smolkin (CNN)
- Isa Soares (CNN International)
- Brian Stelter (CNN)
- Kristie Lu Stout (CNN International)
- David Swerdlick (CNN)
- Jake Tapper (CNN)
- Nina Turner (CNN)
- Geovanny Vicente (CNN en Español)
- Elizabeth Wagmeister (CNN)
- Nick Paton Walsh (CNN International)
- Clarissa Ward (CNN/CNN International)
- Ivan Watson (CNN International)
- Jeff Weaver (CNN)
- Michael Weiss (CNN)
- Fredricka Whitfield (CNN)
- Coy Wire (CNN)
- Andrew Yang (CNN)
- Isobel Yeung (CNN International)
- Fareed Zakaria (CNN)
- Jeff Zeleny (CNN)
- Julian E. Zelizer (CNN)

== Series and specials hosts ==
- Anderson Cooper — CNN Heroes
- Van Jones — The Messy Truth with Van Jones
- Eva Longoria – Eva Longoria: Searching for France
- Jake Tapper – United States of Scandal
- Bill Weir — The Wonder List with Bill Weir
- Fareed Zakaria — The Most Powerful Man in the World

== Political and legal analysts ==
- Dana Bash — Chief Political Correspondent
- Carl Bernstein — Political Analyst
- Wolf Blitzer — CNN Principal Anchor
- Pamela Brown — CNN Anchor and Chief Investigative Correspondent
- David Chalian — Senior Political Analyst; CNN Political Director
- Laura Coates — Chief Legal Analyst
- Kaitlan Collins — Anchor & Chief White House Correspondent
- John Dean — Senior Political Contributor
- Jeremy Diamond — Jerusalem Correspondent
- Jill Dougherty — Geopolitical Analyst
- Harry Enten — Senior Data Reporter and Senior Writer
- Jamie Gangel — CNN Special Correspondent
- David Gregory — Political Analyst
- Maggie Haberman — Political Analyst
- Nia-Malika Henderson – Senior Political Analyst
- John King — Chief National Correspondent
- MJ Lee — Senior National Enterprise Correspondent
- Wesley Lowery — Political Contributor
- Phil Mattingly — Anchor & Chief Domestic Correspondent
- Abby Phillip — Senior Political Correspondent
- Mark Preston — Senior Political Analyst; Executive Editor, CNN Politics
- Manu Raju — Chief Congressional Correspondent
- Josh Rogin — Political Analyst
- Sara Sidner — Senior National Correspondent
- Brian Stelter — Chief Media Analyst
- Jake Tapper — CNN Lead Political Anchor
- Geovanny Vicente — Political Analyst
- Jeff Zeleny — Chief National Affairs Correspondent

== Political contributors ==
- David Axelrod
- Kate Bedingfield
- Paul Begala
- Peter Beinart
- Maria Cardona
- S. E. Cupp
- Charlie Dent
- Geoff Duncan
- Abdul El-Sayed
- Ben Ferguson
- David Frum
- Margaret Hoover
- Coleman Hughes
- Scott Jennings
- Van Jones
- Jason Kander
- Kevin Madden
- Timothy Naftali
- Ana Navarro
- Dan Pfeiffer
- Christine Quinn
- Catherine Rampell
- Hilary Rosen
- Bakari Sellers
- Jamal Simmons
- David Swerdlick
- David Urban
- Geovanny Vicente
- Andrew Yang
- Julian E. Zelizer

== Security and foreign policy analysts ==
- Christiane Amanpour — Chief International Anchor
- Robert Baer — Intelligence and Security Analyst
- Peter Bergen — Chief National Security Analyst
- Matthew Chance — Senior International Correspondent
- James Clapper — National Security Analyst
- Juliette Kayyem — National Security Analyst
- John Miller – Chief Law Enforcement and Intelligence Analyst
- Aaron David Miller — Global Affairs Analyst
- Lisa Monaco — Senior National Security Analyst
- Nic Robertson — International Diplomatic Editor
- Jim Sciutto — Chief National Security Correspondent
- Clarissa Ward — Chief International Correspondent
- Michael Weiss — National Security Analyst
- Fareed Zakaria — Foreign Policy Analyst

== Former personalities ==
- Roz Abrams
- Paolo Abrera (CNN Philippines)
- Jim Acosta
- Jane Akre (CNN)
- Natalie Allen (CNN/CNN International)
- Brooke Alexander
- Serena Altschul
- Shahira Amin (CNN International)
- Brooke Anderson
- Guillermo Arduino (CNN en Español)
- Kelli Arena
- Peter Arnett
- Reza Aslan
- Sharyl Attkisson
- John Avlon (CNN)
- Terry Baddoo
- Rudi Bakhtiar (CNN)
- Brooke Baldwin
- Ashleigh Banfield (CNN then HLN)
- Errol Barnett
- Bobbie Battista
- André Bauer
- Willow Bay
- Bob Beckel
- Ralph Begleiter
- Joy Behar
- Todd Benjamin
- Katie Benner (CNN)
- Steve Berthiaume
- Charles Bierbauer
- Nadia Bilchik (CNN/CNN International)
- Jim Bittermann (CNN International)
- Derek Blasberg (CNN)
- Mike Boettcher
- Michelle Bonner
- Gloria Borger (CNN)
- Anthony Bourdain — Parts Unknown
- Keith Boykin
- Tom Braden
- Donna Brazile
- Andrew Breitbart
- Dave Briggs (CNN)
- Mike Brooks (HLN)
- Aaron Brown (CNN)
- Andrew Brown (CNN)
- Campbell Brown
- Richard Brown
- Kim Brunhuber (CNN International)
- Frank Bruni (CNN)
- Isabel Bucaram (CNN en Español)
- Pat Buchanan
- Samuel Burke (CNN & CNN en Español)
- Diego Bustos (CNN en Español)
- Dylan Byers (CNN)
- Ana Cabrera
- Jack Cafferty
- Catherine Callaway (CNN/HLN)
- Alisyn Camerota (CNN)
- Susan Candiotti
- Richelle Carey
- Margaret Carlson
- Tucker Carlson
- Amanda Carpenter (CNN)
- James Carville
- Stan Case
- Helen Casey
- Bob Cain
- Claire Celdran (CNN Philippines)
- Virginia Cha
- Emily Chang
- Mona Charen
- Nick Charles
- Julia Chatterley (CNN International)
- Joie Chen
- Allan Chernoff
- Kiran Chetry
- Sophia Choi
- Brian Christie
- Connie Chung
- Chris Cillizza (CNN)
- Jim Clancy
- Leesa Clark
- Elizabeth Cohen (CNN)
- Stephen Cole
- Heidi Collins
- Kellyanne Conway
- David Compton
- Shanon Cook (CNN/CNN International)
- Anna Coren (CNN International)
- Adrianna Costa (CNN)
- Carol Costello (HLN)
- Philippe Cousteau Jr. (CNN International)
- Catherine Crier (CNN)
- Candy Crowley
- Chris Cuomo (CNN)
- Robyn Curnow (CNN International)
- Natasha Curry
- Stephanie Cutter
- Arwa Damon (CNN/CNN International)
- Oliver Darcy
- John Defterios (CNN International)
- Laurie Dhue
- Denise Dillon
- Seth Doane
- Lou Dobbs
- Ayesha Durgahee
- Bud Elliott
- Rowland Evans
- Brian Fallon (CNN)
- Marc Fein
- Geraldine Ferraro
- Deborah Feyerick (CNN)
- Elizabeth Filippouli
- Adrian Finighan
- Peter Ford
- Judy Fortin
- Rick Francona (CNN/CNN International)
- Sandi Freeman (CNN)
- David French
- John Fricke
- Tom Fuentes (CNN)
- Mike Galanos (HLN)
- Delia Gallagher (CNN)
- Sara Ganim (CNN/HLN)
- Courtney George
- Mark Geragos
- David Gergen (CNN)
- Kate Giles
- David Goodnow
- Bianna Golodryga (CNN)
- Hala Gorani (CNN International)
- Nancy Grace
- LZ Granderson
- Jennifer Granholm (CNN)
- Jeff Greenfield
- Nick Gregory
- Drew Griffin (CNN)
- Kimberly Guilfoyle
- Mary Katharine Ham
- Poppy Harlow (CNN)
- AJ Hammer (HLN)
- Leon Harris
- Tony Harris
- Don Harrison
- Lois Hart
- Pat Harvey
- Leon Hawthorne
- Michael Hayden (CNN)
- Bill Hemmer
- Kara Henderson
- Susan Hendricks (CNN/HLN)
- Ed Henry
- Nicolette Henson-Hizon (CNN Philippines)
- Mark Hertling (CNN)
- Fred Hickman
- Marc Lamont Hill
- E.D. Hill (CNN)
- Rico Hizon (CNN Philippines)
- John Holliman
- Michael Holmes (CNN/CNN International)
- T. J. Holmes
- Pia Hontiveros (CNN Philippines)
- George Howell
- Eileen Hsieh
- Jim Huber
- Scottie Nell Hughes (CNN)
- Jeff Hullinger
- Al Hunt
- Steve Hurst
- Stella Inger (HLN)
- Steve Israel (CNN/CNN International)
- Christine Jacob (CNN Philippines)
- Doug James (CNN)
- Patricia Janiot (CNN en Espanol)
- Laura Jarrett (CNN)
- Pedram Javaheri (CNN International)
- Joe Johns (CNN)
- Micah Johnson
- Phil Jones
- Daryn Kagan
- Donna Kelley (CNN)
- Joe Kennedy III (CNN)
- Jerrold Kessel
- Riz Khan
- Jodie Kidd (CNN International)
- Larry King
- Jack Kingston
- Michael Kinsley
- Elsa Klensch
- Sally Kohn (CNN)
- Jeff Koinange
- Tal Kopan (CNN)
- Andrea Koppel
- Alison Kosik (CNN)
- Sachi Koto
- Michelle Kosinski (CNN)
- David L. Grange (CNN/CNN International)
- Liz Landers (CNN)
- Amanda Lang
- Nicole Lapin
- Denise LeClair Cobb (HLN)
- Ian James Lee (CNN International)
- May Lee
- Don Lemon
- Josh Levs (CNN)
- Corey Lewandowski
- Matt Lewis (CNN)
- Carol Lin
- Lisa Ling — This Is Life with Lisa Ling
- Ryan Lizza (CNN)
- Dana Loesch (CNN)
- Melissa Long
- Stuart H. Loory
- Jeffrey Lord
- Bob Losure
- Dan Lothian (CNN)
- Mia Love (CNN)
- Bettina Lüscher (CNN International)
- Richard Lui
- Menchu Macapagal (CNN Philippines)
- Tumi Makgabo
- Rima Maktabi
- Suzanne Malveaux (CNN)
- Jonathan Mann (CNN International)
- Rob Marciano
- Miguel Marquez
- Cathy Marshall (CNN)
- Roland S. Martin
- Mary Matalin
- Cami McCormick
- Kayleigh McEnany
- Robin Meade (HLN)
- Chloe Melas (CNN)
- Cherie Mercado
- Jim Miklaszewski
- Mary Jo Mitchell
- Tom Mintier
- Jeanne Moos (CNN)
- Stephen Moore (writer) (CNN)
- Jim Moret
- Piers Morgan
- Bruce Morton
- Sara Murray
- Reynelda Muse
- Octavia Nasr
- Arthel Neville
- Lucia Newman
- Betty Nguyen
- Rachel Nichols
- Ryan Nobles (CNN)
- Robert Novak
- Michael Nutter
- Robin Oakley (CNN International)
- Miles O'Brien
- Soledad O'Brien
- Femi Oke
- Keith Olbermann
- Alejandra Gutierrez Oraa (CNN en Español)
- Marga Ortigas
- Kris Osborn
- Christina Park
- Kathleen Parker
- Christi Paul (CNN/HLN)
- Veronica Pedrosa
- Perri Peltz
- Michaela Pereira (HLN)
- Cal Perry
- Indra Petersons
- Kyra Phillips (CNN/HLN)
- Kitty Pilgrim
- Drew Pinsky (HLN)
- Pedro Pinto (CNN International)
- Katrina Pierson (CNN)
- Chris Plante
- Vinnie Politan (HLN)
- Kirsten Powers (CNN)
- Elizabeth Prann (HLN)
- Bill Press (CNN)
- Jen Psaki
- Norma Quarles
- Ash-har Quraishi
- Aneesh Raman
- JJ Ramberg
- Dallas Raines
- Anjali Rao
- Candy Reid
- Jacque Reid
- Paula Reid (CNN)
- Maria Ressa
- Emily Reuben (CNN International)
- Naibe Reynoso (CNN en Español)
- Kate Riley
- Sasha Rionda (CNN en Español)
- Dan Rivers
- Chuck Roberts
- John Roberts
- Thomas Roberts
- Shirley Robertson (CNN International)
- Mai Rodriguez (CNN Philippines)
- Susan Roesgen
- Mike Rogers
- Christine Romans (CNN)
- Susan Rook
- Ted Rowlands (CNN)
- Lynne Russell (HLN)
- Angela Rye (CNN)
- David S. Rohde (CNN)
- Brent Sadler
- Ines Sainz (CNN en Español)
- Zoraida Sambolin
- Rick Sanchez
- Rick Santorum
- Martin Savidge (CNN/HLN/CNN International)
- Robin Sax (HLN)
- Andreas van der Schaaf
- Bill Schneider
- Suzanne Sena (HLN)
- Laurie Segall (CNN)
- Isha Sesay
- Frank Sesno
- Tara Setmayer
- Bella Shaw
- Bernard Shaw
- Mark Shields
- Daniel Schorr
- Atika Shubert (CNN International)
- Lynn Smith (HLN)
- Kate Snow
- Tony Snow
- Linden Soles
- Rahel Solomon (CNN)
- Martin Soong
- Jim Spellman (CNN/HLN)
- Eliot Spitzer
- Barbara Starr (CNN/CNN International)
- Alice Stewart (CNN)
- Linda Stouffer (HLN)
- Kathleen Sullivan
- Fionnuala Sweeney
- Lisa Sylvester
- Sherri Sylvester (CNN)
- Manisha Tank (CNN International)
- Jonathan Tasini
- Abbi Tatton
- Kayla Tausche (CNN)
- Felicia Taylor
- Owen Thomas
- Andrea Thompson
- Mary Tillotson
- Jeffrey Toobin (CNN)
- Fran Townsend (CNN)
- Gary Tuchman (CNN)
- Nischelle Turner
- Bill Tush (CNN)
- JD Vance (CNN)
- Bob Van Dillen (HLN)
- Alphonso Van Marsh
- Greta Van Susteren
- Stuart Varney
- Ralitsa Vassileva (CNN International)
- Hannah Vaughan Jones (CNN International)
- Lyn Vaughn
- John Vause (CNN International)
- Jane Velez-Mitchell (HLN)
- Amelyn Veloso
- Ali Velshi
- Zain Verjee (CNN International)
- Alessio Vinci
- Samantha Vinograd (CNN)
- Amara Walker (CNN/CNN International)
- Dave Walker
- Kelly Wallace (CNN)
- Chris Wallace (CNN)
- Selina Wang (CNN International)
- Michael Ware
- Margaret Warner
- Lou Waters
- Bob Weaver
- Pinky Webb (CNN Philippines)
- Ben Wedeman (CNN International)
- Rafer Weigel
- Jennifer Westhoven (HLN)
- Harris Whitbeck
- Liz Wickersham
- Beverly Williams
- Mary Alice Williams
- Gerri Willis
- Reynolds Wolf
- Jack Womack
- Judy Woodruff
- Nick Wrenn
- Van Earl Wright
- Jessica Yellin
- Joseph Yun
- Paula Zahn
- John Zarrella
- Charles Zewe
