= Doug James =

Doug James may refer to:

- Doug James (American football)
- Doug James (journalist)
- Doug James (musician)

== See also ==
- Douglas James-Taylor, English footballer
