= Ashley Etienne =

Haitian American political advisor (born 1978)

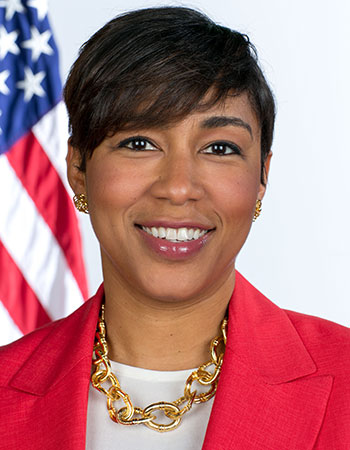

Communications Director for the Vice President
- In office January 20, 2021 – December 2021
- Vice President: Kamala Harris
- Deputy: Herbie Ziskend
- Preceded by: Katie Miller
- Succeeded by: Jamal Simmons

Personal details
- Born: Ashley Danielle Etienne; February 21, 1978 (age 48) Texas, U.S.
- Party: Democratic
- Education: Sam Houston State University (BA); Johns Hopkins University (MA)

Ashley Danielle Etienne (born February 21, 1978) is an American political advisor who served as the communications director for Vice President Kamala Harris. She is the former communications director and senior advisor to Nancy Pelosi, the first woman and person of color to hold the position of Communications Director for the House Speaker. She was also a former special assistant to Barack Obama.

== Early life and education ==
Etienne, who is of African American heritage, was born in Texas. Etienne earned her Bachelor of Arts degree in political science from Sam Houston State University in 2000 and a Master of Arts in political communications from Johns Hopkins University.

== Career ==
Etienne has worked in political communications since 2001. For two years starting in 2001, she worked as a staff assistant and then communications director for Ken Bentsen, a Texas Congressman. In 2004, she was communications director for Chris Bell, followed by a stint at the Democratic National Committee as deputy director of the southern region. Etienne worked for Al Green from 2006 until 2008 as communications director. She briefly worked for Dewey Square Group in 2008 before joining Barack Obama's 2008 presidential campaign as a spokesperson. She also ran her own communications firm briefly in 2009. From 2011 to 2013, she was director of communications for the United States House Committee on Oversight and Reform, working closely with Elijah Cummings.In 2013, she became deputy director of communications for Nancy Pelosi focusing on freshman congress-members and their messaging.

After Obama won the election, she served as director of communications for Obama's cabinet and special assistant to Obama. After Trump won the election, she made plans to relocate to the West Coast.

Nancy Pelosi offered Etienne a job as communications director and senior advisor. Etienne discussed the opportunity with Cummings, who told her that she should return to Washington and take the job. Upon acceptance, Etienne became the first woman and first person of color to hold the position. During her tenure, she oversaw Democratic messaging for the Impeachment of Donald Trump.

In August 2020, she was recruited by Anita Dunn to serve as senior adviser for strategic planning for the Joe Biden 2020 presidential campaign.

Etienne served as the communications director to Vice President Kamala Harris starting on January 20, 2021. It was announced on November 18, 2021, that she would resign to pursue other opportunities. She left office in December 2021.

== Personal life ==
Etienne is Baptist. She is a single mom to a daughter, born c. 2015.
