= Omar Jimenez =

American journalist, correspondent (born 1993)

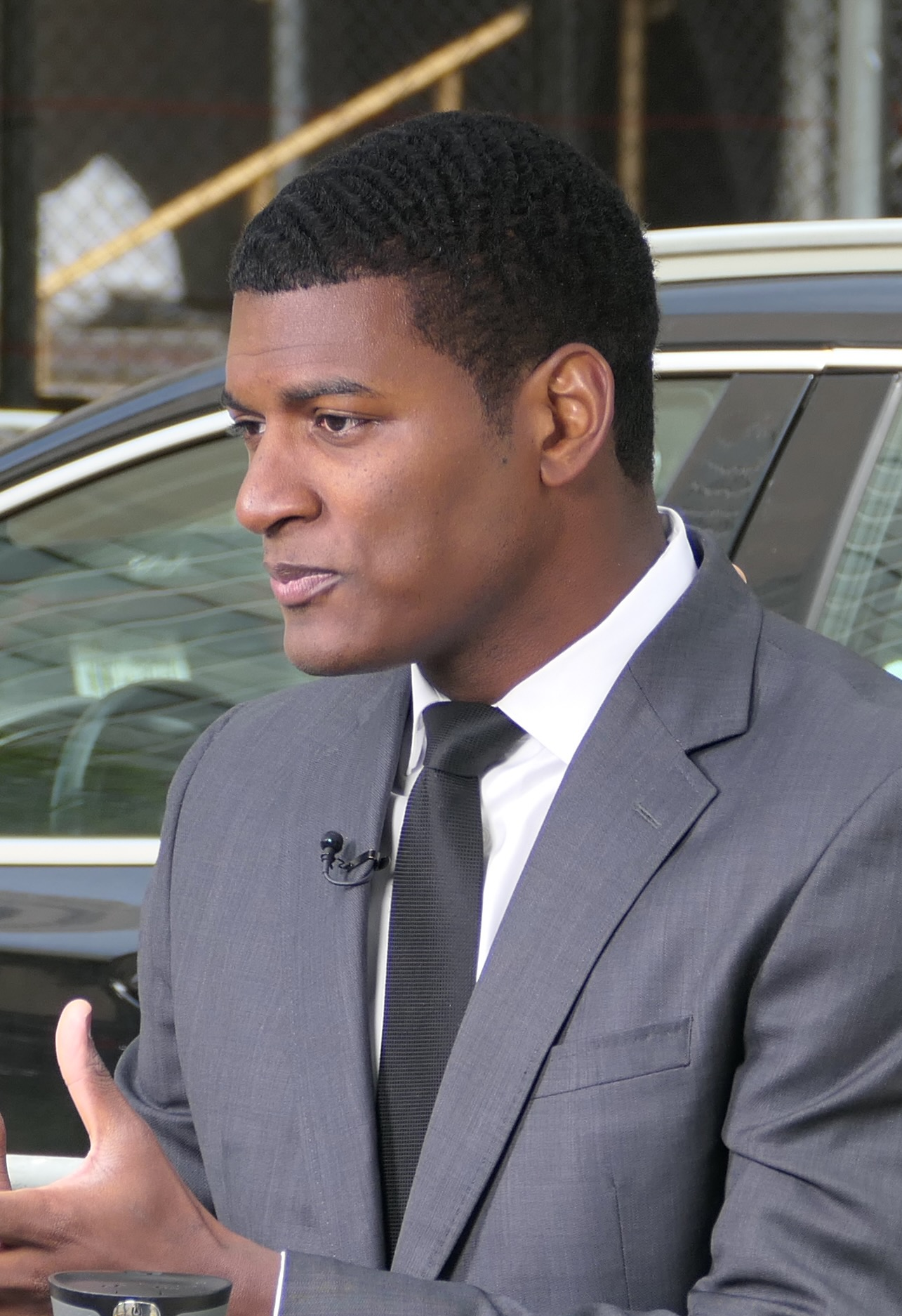
- Omar Jimenez in 2024.
- Born: November 27, 1993 (age 32); Worcester, Massachusetts, U.S.
- Education: Northwestern University (BSJ)
- Occupation: Journalist
- Employer: CNN
- Website: omarjimenez.com at the Wayback Machine (archived 2022-04-12)

Omar Fernando Jimenez (born November 27, 1993) is an American journalist and correspondent working for CNN.

== Early life and education ==
Jimenez was born in Worcester, Massachusetts, and raised in Kennesaw, Georgia. His mother, Jayne Morgan, is a cardiologist and African American, and his father, Omar Jimenez Jr., is a neurosurgeon and native of Colombia. Jimenez has three brothers. He identifies as Afro-Latino. When he was in sixth grade, his parents divorced, and he lived with his mother.

Jimenez attended Kennesaw Mountain High School. While playing high school basketball, Jimenez fractured his back and was unable to play for eight months. He attended the Medill School of Journalism at Northwestern University, where he majored in broadcast journalism. He played on the men's varsity basketball team from 2011 to 2013 at Northwestern after a successful walk-on tryout. With other journalism and law students, Jimenez worked with the Chicago Innocence Project to investigate wrongful convictions.

== Career ==
Jimenez began his career in journalism as an intern in the Chicago bureau of NBC News For almost four years, Jimenez worked on-air as a multimedia journalist at WGEM-TV in Quincy, Illinois. He was a general assignment reporter and fill-in anchor at WBAL-TV in Baltimore, Maryland. Jimenez worked at WBAL from July 2015 to June 2017.

Jimenez has worked at CNN since August 7, 2017, first at CNN Newsource in Washington, D.C. He has reported for over 900 CNN affiliate news stations nationwide covering breaking news. He is now based in Chicago as a CNN correspondent.

=== George Floyd protests arrest ===
Early on the morning of May 29, 2020, Jimenez and his three-person news crew were arrested by a group of Minnesota State Patrol officers while reporting live on protests in response to the murder of George Floyd in Minneapolis, Minnesota. According to Jimenez, he was arrested despite agreeing to move where directed, and despite he and his team's media credentials being visible and valid.

As he reported live on CNN's New Day program with Alisyn Camerota and John Berman, Jimenez was approached by two officers who ordered the team to move. He immediately agreed, asking where they should move to, but officers walked away. Minutes later, as Jimenez continued to report, he, along with producer Bill Kirkos, camera operator Leonel Mendez, and a security guard were approached by a group of officers who surrounded and arrested them as they continued to ask where the state police wanted them to move. They were detained on-scene, then at a local precinct station, before being released about an hour and a half later. CNN President Jeff Zucker called Minnesota Governor Tim Walz directly to insist on the crew's release. During their conversation, Walz apologized to Zucker for the incident, calling it "unacceptable."

=== Jacob Blake riots ===
During the riots after the Jacob Blake shooting by police, Jimenez reported on the situation from Kenosha, Wisconsin. He was on camera with a burning building behind him and a gas mask around his neck while the CNN chyron said that what was happening were "Fiery But Mostly Peaceful" protests, though Jimenez never actually described the scene that way in his report. This image was widely circulated on social media and CNN was heavily criticized.

== Awards and honors ==
At Northwestern, he won various national and regional student awards for reporting, including the National Mark of Excellence Award for student television reporting from the Society of Professional Journalists and a Bronze award from the National College Emmys in the newscast category.

While working at WBAL-TV, Jimenez received an individual Emmy nomination for general assignment reporting.

== Personal life ==
Jimenez began playing music in high school. He enjoys rap and hip-hop, and has released music on SoundCloud under the name OJ Tropicana. His debut EP, Reporting Live, was released in 2017. He worked with producer Daiz and musician Drew Tildon. His artistry is influenced by Childish Gambino. In 2013, he appeared on a "Battle of the Instant Rappers" segment on Late Night with Jimmy Fallon.

In February 2020, Jimenez went on a first date with Maya Voelk in Los Angeles, California. In March 2023, Jimenez proposed to Voelk at the rooftop of the 1 Hotel Brooklyn Bridge building in Brooklyn, New York. On July 6, 2024, Jimenez married Voelk at the Seattle Tennis Club in Seattle, Washington.

== See also ==
- List of CNN personnel
