= Rachel Smolkin =

American journalist

- Education: Brown University (B.A.); Columbia University
- Occupations: Journalist; Editor
- Employer: CNN

Rachel Smolkin is an American journalist who works as the Vice President and Executive Editor of CNN Politics for CNN where she oversees all of CNN's political coverage.

== Biography ==
Smolkin is the daughter of Mitchell T. and Laura B. Smolkin. She graduated magna cum laude from Brown University and is a graduate of the Sulzberger Executive Leadership Program at Columbia University. After school she worked as a journalist for the Philadelphia Inquirer. She then worked as an editor at USA Today; managing editor of American Journalism Review magazine; and the managing editor at Politico. In August 2014, she was hired as the Executive Editor of CNN Politics, where she built their digital team, which consists of more than 50 reporters, editors and social producers including Greg Krieg, Dan Berman, Dylan Byers, Tal Kopan, Stephen Collinson, and Zach Wolf.

== Personal life ==
Smolkin lives in Arlington, Virginia, with her husband and two children.
