= Tumi (disambiguation) =

The Tumi is the sacrificial ceremonial knife used by the Incas and pre-Inca civilizations.

Tumi may also refer to:

== People ==
- Tumi (tribe), are ancient tribe that once inhabited southern Sumatra, Indonesia.
- Tumi Makgabo (born c. 1974/75), an anchor for CNN international.
- Tumi Molekane (born 1981), a musician.
  - Tumi and the Volume, an African hip hop music ensemble that includes Tumi Molekane.
- Christian Tumi (1930–2021), a cardinal, archbishop of Douala, Cameroon.

== Sports ==
- Peru national rugby union team, nicknamed Los Tumis.

== Places ==
- Binə, Khojavend, Azerbaijan, also known as Tumi.

== Companies ==
- Tumi Inc., a luxury luggage manufacturer.
- Tumi Music, a Latin American record label.

== Other ==
- Tumi language, a Kainji language of Nigeria.
