= Jason Carroll (journalist) =

American journalist

- Born: Jason Frederick Carroll; Westlake, California, United States
- Education: University of Southern California
- Occupation: Journalist

Jason Frederick Carroll is an American journalist who is a national correspondent for CNN, a cable-news television channel.

== Early life and education ==
Carroll is from Westlake, California. He graduated with a Bachelor of Arts degree in literature and creative writing from the University of Southern California, located in Los Angeles, California.

== Career ==
Carroll was scouted as a model after high school. His broadcast career started while at University as an on-air intern at KGET-TV in Bakersfield, California. He also interned for 60 Minutes. His professional life includes reporting for CBS2 in Los Angeles before moving to CNN New York. Since joining CNN he has covered numerous political and breaking-news stories including Presidential elections in 2016 and 2020, wars in Ukraine and Afghanistan, the East Palestine train derailment, the earthquake in Haiti, Hurricanes Hurricane Katrina, and Hurricane Sandy.

Carroll was detained live on air by the Los Angeles Police Department while covering the June 2025 Los Angeles protests.

=== Awards ===
Carroll is a recipient of numerous awards including an Emmy and the Edward R. Murrow Award.

== See also ==
- List of CNN anchors (includes list of correspondents)
- List of television reporters
- List of University of Southern California people
