= Mark Perry (author) =

American author (1950–2021)

- Born: 1950
- Died: August 8, 2021 (aged 70–71)
- Education: Northwestern Military and Naval Academy
- Alma mater: Boston University
- Writing career
- Genre: Non-fiction

Mark Perry (1950 – 8 August 2021) was an American author specializing in military, intelligence, and foreign affairs analysis.

He authored nine books: Four Stars, Eclipse: The Last Days of the CIA, A Fire In Zion: Inside the Israeli-Palestinian Peace Process, Conceived in Liberty, Lift Up Thy Voice, Grant and Twain, Partners In Command, Talking To Terrorists, and The Most Dangerous Man in America: The Making of Douglas MacArthur.

Perry's articles have been featured in a number of publications including The Los Angeles Times, The Washington Post, The Nation, Newsday, the St. Louis Post-Dispatch, the Christian Science Monitor, and The Plain Dealer (Cleveland, Ohio).

== Background ==
Perry was a graduate of Northwestern Military and Naval Academy and of Boston University.

== Career ==
Perry was the former co-director of the Washington, D.C., London, and Beirut-based Conflicts Forum, which specializes in engaging with Islamist movements in the Levant in dialogue with the West. Perry served as co-director for over five years. A detailed five-part series on this experience was published by the Asia Times in March and in July 2006. Perry served as an unofficial advisor to PLO Chairman and Palestinian President Yasser Arafat from 1989 to 2004.

Perry appeared on numerous national and international televised forums. He was a frequent guest commentator and expert on Al-Jazeera television, appeared regularly on CNN’s The International Hour and on Special Assignment. Perry’s work on the CIA’s program to destabilize the Saddam Hussein regime, originally published by Regardies magazine, was the basis for an award winning BBC Panorama production of “The Intelligence War Against Iraq”. His son, Cal Perry, was a CNN Mideast correspondent and al-Jazeera's Jerusalem correspondent.

Perry's books have met with critical acclaim from Kirkus Reviews, The Washington Post, The New York Review of Books, The New York Times, The New Yorker, and many other publications. He has served as editor of Washington D.C.’s City Paper, and The VVA Veteran, the largest circulation newspaper for veterans.

Perry was also Washington correspondent for The Palestine Report, and was a senior fellow at the Jerusalem Media and Communications Center.

Perry was a senior foreign policy analyst for Vietnam Veterans of America Foundation (VVAF). VVAF, an international humanitarian organization, co-founded the International Campaign to Ban Landmines, the 1997 Nobel Peace Prize recipient. Perry served as the political director for the VVAF’s Campaign for a Landmine Free World.

Perry served as a senior analyst at the Quincy Institute for Responsible Statecraft.

Israeli journalist Ehud Yaari described him as "veteran anti-Israel warrior".

== Works ==
- Four Stars: The Inside Story of the Forty-Year Battle Between the Joint Chiefs of Staff and America's Civilian Leaders ISBN 9780395429235
- Eclipse: The Last Days of the CIA, ISBN 9780756751807
- A Fire In Zion: Inside the Israeli-Palestinian Peace Process, New York: Morrow, 1994. ISBN 9780688121716
- Conceived in Liberty: William Oates, Joshua Chamberlain, and the American Civil War, New York: Morrow, 1994. ISBN 9780140247978
- Lift Up Thy Voice, on the Grimké family, ISBN 9780142001035
- Grant and Twain: The Story of a Friendship That Changed America ISBN 9780679642732
- Partners In Command: George Marshall and Dwight Eisenhower in War and Peace, New York: Penguin Books, 2007. ISBN 9781594201059, OCLC 263426426
- Talking To Terrorists: Why America Must Engage with its Enemies, Basic Books, 2011. ISBN 9780465011179
- The Most Dangerous Man in America: The Making of Douglas MacArthur. Basic Books, 2014. ISBN 9780465051687, OCLC 888557149
