= Mark Preston (political analyst) =

American journalist (born 1971)

- Born: July 21, 1971 (age 55)
- Education: Arlington High School; University of Massachusetts Amherst (BA)
- Occupations: Executive Editor, CNN Politics; CNN Senior Political Analyst; Journalist
- Years active: 1997—present
- Employer: CNN
- Known for: CNN Senior Political Analyst (Jan. 2017—); Vice President of Political & Special Events Programming (2014—); CNN Political Director (2011—2014); CNN Political Editor (2005—2011); Congressional Correspondent, Roll Call (1999—2005)
- Spouse: Meredith Preston (née Ray Bonner) m. July 8, 2000
- Parents: Eugene Preston; Mary Preston
- Website: Official webpage at CNN

Mark Preston (born July 21, 1971) is Vice President of Political & Special Events Programming at CNN, and a CNN Senior Political Analyst. His role is to oversee CNN’s election night coverage across its broadcasting and online platforms, organize CNN’s presidential debates and forums, and serve as CNN's main contact with political campaigns at both the state and national level, and to lead the conception and execution of CNN's political events.

Preston also provides political analysis for CNN, CNN International and CNN.com, regularly appearing on CNN's major news analysis shows such as New Day, Erin Burnett OutFront, Anderson Cooper 360°, Cuomo Prime Time and CNN Tonight with Don Lemon, and was promoted to Senior Political Analyst in January 2017. He was formerly CNN's Political Director, a post subsequently taken by David Chalian in 2014.

== Early life ==
Preston was born in July 1971 and is the son of Eugene Preston and Mary Preston.

== Education ==
Preston was educated at Arlington High School, a public secondary school in the town of Arlington, Massachusetts, from which he graduated in 1990, followed by the University of Massachusetts Amherst, where he studied journalism and history. While there, he worked on the Massachusetts Daily Collegian and freelanced for the Associated Press. He also worked in the office of Senator Edward Kennedy.

== Life and career ==
Preston started his career as a print journalist. He was a correspondent at States News Services, a wire service in Washington, D.C., and at the Marietta Daily Journal in Marietta, Georgia, during which he won several Georgia Press Association and Georgia Associated Press reporting awards.

Preston was a senior staff writer for the Capitol Hill newspaper Roll Call, during which he was a congressional correspondent revealing important policy and political decisions made behind closed doors. He appeared on many media outlets as a guest analyst, including CNN, C-SPAN, Fox News, ABC Radio, National Public Radio and Radio America, as well as local media outlets.

Early in his career, Preston saw the collapse of the newspaper industry and the rise of 24-hour news. He decided to leave print journalism to join CNN.

=== Career at CNN ===
Preston joined CNN in 2005 as political editor. He played a key role in the network’s election night coverage in 2006, which won an Emmy Award, and of CNN’s 2008 campaign coverage, which won a Peabody Award. In 2011, he became CNN’s Political Director. The network received another Emmy Award for its coverage in 2012. Preston's work contributed to CNN receiving Syracuse University’s i-3 Mirror Award for the YouTube presidential debates and an EPpy Award for Best News/Politics Blog. In 2014, he became Executive Editor of CNN Politics while retaining his work as an on-screen political analyst, appearing on a wide variety of CNN programs. In January 2017, he was promoted to CNN Senior Political Analyst.

=== SiriusXM Satellite Radio ===
Preston co-hosted with Chris Frates the weekly satellite radio program Politics Inside Out, on Sirius XM Satellite Radio's Channel 124, known as P.O.T.U.S. In July 2017, he left the program, which was retitled Politics Inside Out with Chris Frates, while Preston began single-hosting a new political program, Full Stop with Mark Preston.

== Personal life ==
Preston married Meredith Ray Bonner on July 8, 2000, while a reporter at the Capitol Hill newspaper Roll Call, at the Holy Spirit Catholic Church in Atlanta, Georgia, the U.S. state in which they first met as reporters at the Marietta Daily Journal, in the city of Marietta. The couple spent their honeymoon in North Carolina.

== See also ==
- List of CNN personnel
