= Lisa Sylvester =

American journalist and television correspondent

Lisa Sylvester is an American Peabody and Emmy award-winning journalist and television correspondent. She previously reported on CNN's The Situation Room. She joined WPXI, Channel 11 in Pittsburgh in October 2013, anchoring the 5, 6 and 11 p.m. and on WPGH's 10 p.m. newscast, which is produced by WPXI.

== Career ==
She earned a bachelor's degree in international economics at Georgetown University and then a master's degree from Northwestern University's Medill School of Journalism. She worked for KTVI-TV in St. Louis, for WMBD-TV in Peoria, Illinois, and for WKRN-TV in Nashville, Tennessee, before her start in major network news. She worked for ABC News from 2000 to 2004, and as the Washington-based correspondent for Lou Dobbs Tonight. She then moved to CNN and she served as a Washington, D.C.–based correspondent for The Situation Room. In early 2021, she began anchoring WPXI's 5 p.m. newscasts, replacing Peggy Finnegan who retired in late 2020. In April 2022, she and Dennis Owens of WHTM-TV hosted a series of debates for upcoming Pennsylvania elections, including a debate between Democratic candidates for U.S. Senate on April 21st, a debate between Republican candidates for U.S. Senate on April 25th, and a debate between Republican candidates for governor on April 27th. They met again on October 25th and hosted a Pennsylvania U.S. Senate debate between Republican candidate Mehmet Oz and Democratic candidate John Fetterman.

== See also ==
- List of CNN anchors
- List of Georgetown University alumni
