= Maria Cardona =

Consultant and political strategist

- Born: November 12, 1966 (age 60); Bogotá, Colombia
- Education: Duke University
- Known for: CNN commentator
- Political party: Democratic Party
- Relatives: Desiree Lowry (sister-in-law)

Maria Teresa Cardona (born November 12, 1966) is an American political strategist and commentator who works at the Dewey Square Group and is the founder of Latinovations. Cardona is also a Democratic strategist and CNN/CNN en Español political commentator. Starting in 2020 Maria spearheads !MARIA! with Maria Cardona talk show. She dissects advocacy and public policy affecting Latinos in the U.S. through the El Rey Network.

== Early life ==
Maria Teresa Cardona was born in Bogotá, Colombia. She moved to the United States with her family at the age of two and lived in Ohio but shortly after settled in Leesburg, Florida. At the beginning of the 8th grade, she and her family moved to Puerto Rico. She is a graduate of Duke University.

== Career ==
=== Early start ===
Cardona spent five years at the United States Department of Commerce, first as Deputy Press Secretary to Secretary Ronald H. Brown and in charge of the press offices of all the 14 agencies. Following the airplane crash into a mountainside in Croatia that killed Secretary Brown, Cardona was left to handle the live press briefing alone. She then went on to be the Press Secretary to Secretaries William Daley and Mickey Kantor. While there, she acted as Lead Communications Strategist for the passage of the North American Free Trade Agreement (NAFTA) in 1993. In 1997, she was awarded the Department of Commerce's Silver Medal Award for Meritorious Federal Service.

From 1998 to 2001, Cardona was the Director of Communications for the United States Department of Justice's Immigration and Naturalization Service (INS), acting as the Clinton Administration's top spokesperson on the complex issues surrounding immigration, including the Elián González affair. She was chosen by Hispanic Business Magazine as one of the 100 Most Influential Hispanics in the country of that year.

From 2001 to 2003, she served as Communications Director of the Democratic National Committee, where she helped coordinate the national Democratic message for the party officials, elected leaders, candidates and state Democratic Party committees.

Cardona joined the New Democrat Network (NDN) in 2003 as their vice president for Media Relations, where she developed and directed NDN's ongoing efforts to help Democrats better understand and community to the Hispanic electorate. She also directed NDN's Hispanic Project, which was created to expand research and polling, candidate recruitment, and national paid and earned media communications strategies targeted to Hispanic audiences, in both English and Spanish. The $6 million initiative was, at the time, the largest effort ever to conduct dedicated research and deliver the Democratic message to the Latino community.

=== Dewey Square Group and Latinovations ===
Cardona joined the Dewey Square Group in 2005 as a principal, helping their corporate, non-profit and trade association clients develop strategic partnerships at the national, state and local level, especially within the Latino community. She used her background to tap into the Latino community and ensure that Dewey clients were well represented and understand the demographic.

Cardona went on to launch Latinovations, the firm's Latino strategies practice, which uses her influence and experience to advocate on Latino issues, guiding clients searching for building support on positions, products, and brands within the Hispanic/Latino community. Latinovations produces its own daily blog, titled La Plaza, which covers national news and policies that affect the Latino community.

=== Hillary Clinton's 2008 presidential campaign ===
While at Dewey Square Group, Cardona served as a senior advisor to the Hillary Clinton's 2008 presidential campaign, serving as a campaign surrogate and spokesperson and representing the campaign on major national TV and radio, as well as Spanish-language television news and political programs. She also served on Clinton's Hispanic outreach team.

Following the primary, Cardona served as a surrogate for the Obama for America general election campaign.

=== CNN and present ===
In October 2011, Cardona joined the CNN Network for the 2012 presidential election season as a political contributor, and was the first Latina Democratic contributor on CNN and the only person, at that time, to contribute to both CNN Domestic and CNN en Español. "Having spent all of my professional career in communications, public policy, and politics, I'm thrilled to join CNN as a political contributor, especially as we are entering the excitement of the upcoming 2012 presidential election cycle," she said. She continues to make appearances on CNN and CNN en Español and writes editorials speaking on a variety of national issues.

Currently, Cardona sits as a board member of numerous organizations dedicated to Latino issues. She serves on the board of directors for Hoops Sagrado, a non-profit organization that provides learning and leadership opportunities to DC youth through a basketball exchange program in the highlands of Guatemala; New America Media, the country's first and largest national collaboration and advocate of 3,000 ethnic news organizations; Citizenship Counts, a non-profit organization dedicated to educating middle-school students on the responsibilities and civic duties of American citizens; PODER PAC, the first political action committee that raises money for Latina candidates at all levels; the Friends of the National Museum of the American Latino, an independent commission established to study the feasibility of creating a national museum dedicated to highlighting the contributions of American Latinos; and co-chairs inSPIRE STEM USA, a coalition of businesses, education advocates and other national organizations supportive of a two-part plan to address immigration and workforce development needs and improve the country's STEM education pipeline.

She was named one of the nation's Top 50 Most Influential Latinos in 2012.

== Personal life ==
Cardona currently lives in Washington, D.C., with her husband, Bryan Weaver, and their two children.
