= Garrett Haake =

American journalist

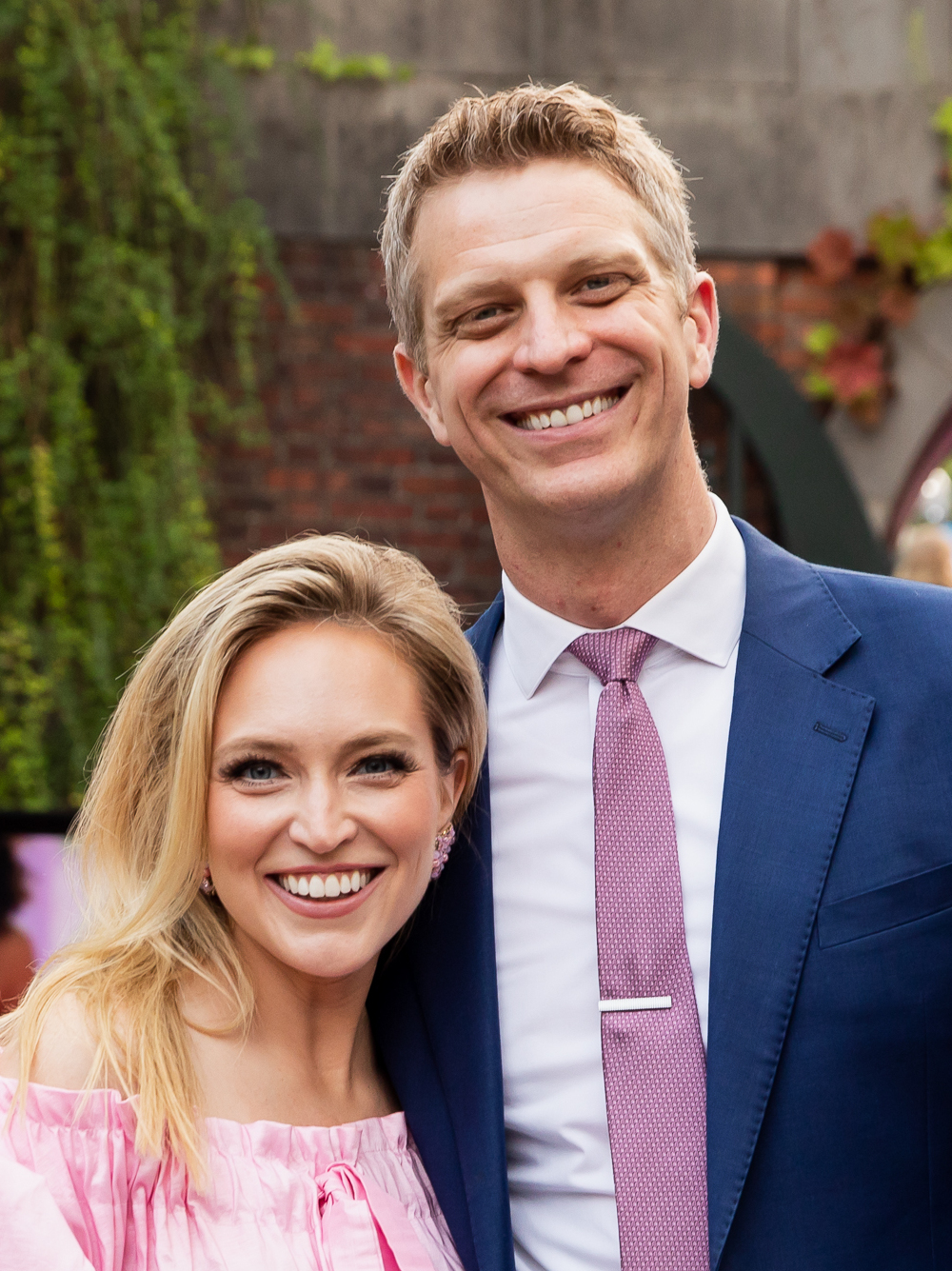
- Garrett Haake with his wife, Allison Harris on July 17, 2023
- Born: 1984 or 1985 (age 41)
- Education: Southern Methodist University (2007)
- Occupation: Journalist
- Employer: NBC News (2017–present)
- Spouse: Sara Murray (m. 2017; div. 2019) Allison Harris (m. 2021)
- Children: 2

Garrett Haake (/ˈheɪk/) is an American journalist who has been a White House Correspondent for NBC News since January 2025 first as a Senior White House Correspondent and then as Chief White House Correspondent since May 2026. He previously served as the Senior Capitol Hill Correspondent for NBC News and MSNBC from 2021 through 2025.

== Early life ==
Haake was born in either 1984 or 1985. Haake attended Southern Methodist University where he was offered the President's Scholarship. Haake met Anderson Cooper while Haake was a college student. He graduated from the university in 2007. He interned with NBC Nightly News in New York after his junior year of college.

== Career ==
Haake began working as a desk assistant for NBC Nightly News. He then took on roles as a researcher, associate producer, and an embedded reporter for a presidential campaign.

He covered the Mitt Romney Presidential Campaign during the 2012 U.S. Presidential Election.

Haake has also covered stories about the Impeachment of Donald Trump and the COVID-19 pandemic. He has characterized his work of being a reporter as akin to "drinking from a firehose".

On January 12, 2023, Haake was scolded by MSNBC anchor Andrea Mitchell after he reported Republican U.S. Congresswoman Nancy Mace own response, about characterizing herself as 'pro-life' during a news segment.

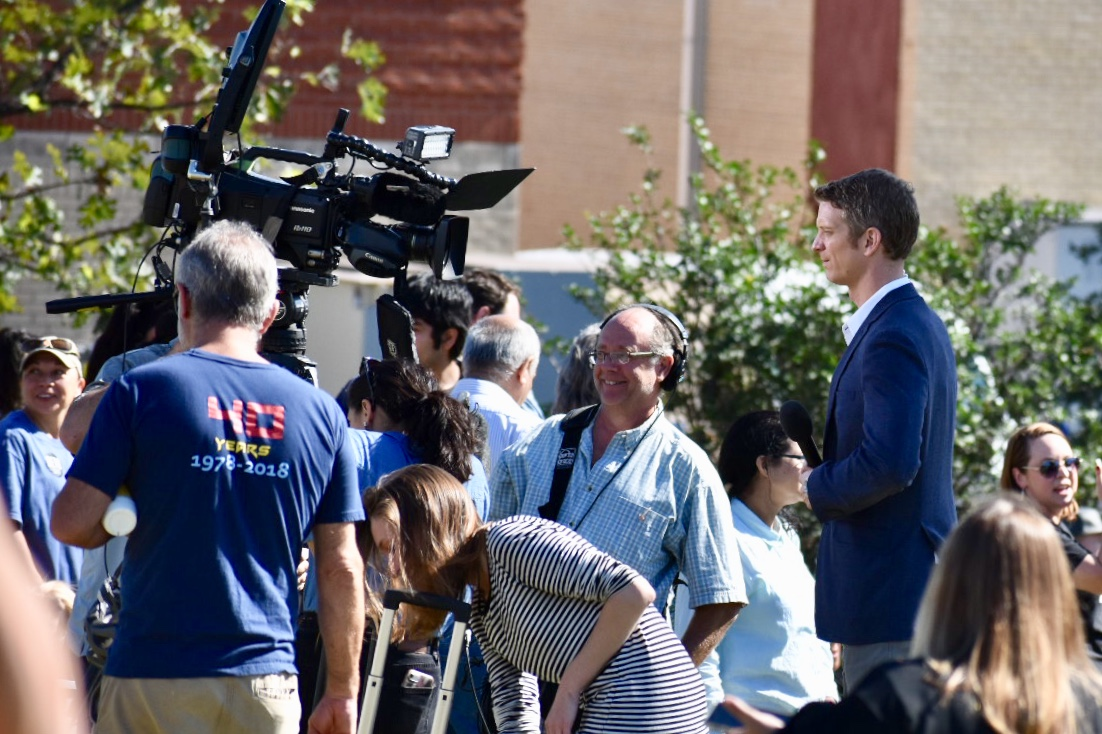
Haake at a rally for then U.S. Senate Candidate Beto O'Rourke in Austin, Texas

Haake was promoted from Senior White House Correspondent to Chief White House Correspondent at NBC News in May 2026 after Peter Alexander left the network. This role has given him even greater exposure on election nights and as a fill-in anchor.

== Personal life ==
Haake is married to NewsNation White House correspondent Allison Harris. They have two daughters.

Haake was previously married to CNN correspondent Sara Murray.
