= Michael Whouley =

American political lobbyist

Michael Whouley is an American Democratic Party political consultant who specializes in get out the vote operations. Whouley is President of the Dewey Square Group, a consulting firm that works for both political and corporate clients as lobbyists and campaign strategists.

Whouley, who spent his childhood and launched his career in the Dorchester section of Boston, Massachusetts, was a key strategist for Bill Clinton, serving as his field director during the 1992 election. Following Clinton's inauguration, Whouley became a lobbyist on behalf of pro-North American Free Trade Agreement (NAFTA) interests. During the 1996 election, Whouley served as director of Vice Presidential operations.

Whouley was a key strategist for both Al Gore in 2000 and John Kerry in 2004. Whouley helped jumpstart both Gore's and Kerry's comeback in the presidential primaries after they came close to being overtaken by Bill Bradley and Howard Dean respectively.

Whouley is regarded as one of the Democratic Party's best field strategists and as a result has earned the nickname "The Wizard". Despite this, he is fairly reclusive and very rarely does media interviews. He avoids reporters as much as possible.

Mark Halperin of Time reported on December 14, 2007, that Michael Whouley had been working for Senator Hillary Clinton's Iowa campaign for several weeks. Whouley also ran Clinton's New Hampshire operation in January 2008.

== In film ==
Comedian/actor Denis Leary portrayed Whouley in the 2008 HBO movie Recount. Whouley objected to his character's swearing in the film as well as a scene in which he breaks a chair.
