= Ayesha Durgahee =

British journalist and presenter

Ayesha Durgahee is a British freelance television journalist and presenter, based in London.

She studied geography at King's College London.

== Career ==
She worked for CNN as the resident reporter of CNN Business Traveller.

Durgahee was named Carlson Wagonlit Business Travel News Journalist of the Year 2010 for her investigative piece on aerotoxic syndrome affecting pilots and cabin crews, and won the same award in 2013..

Since leaving CNN International, Durgahee has been presenting a weekly football panel show on Bloomberg TV and has contributed to shows for Reuters including the Cannes Film Festival 2017.
