= Cal Perry =

American journalist

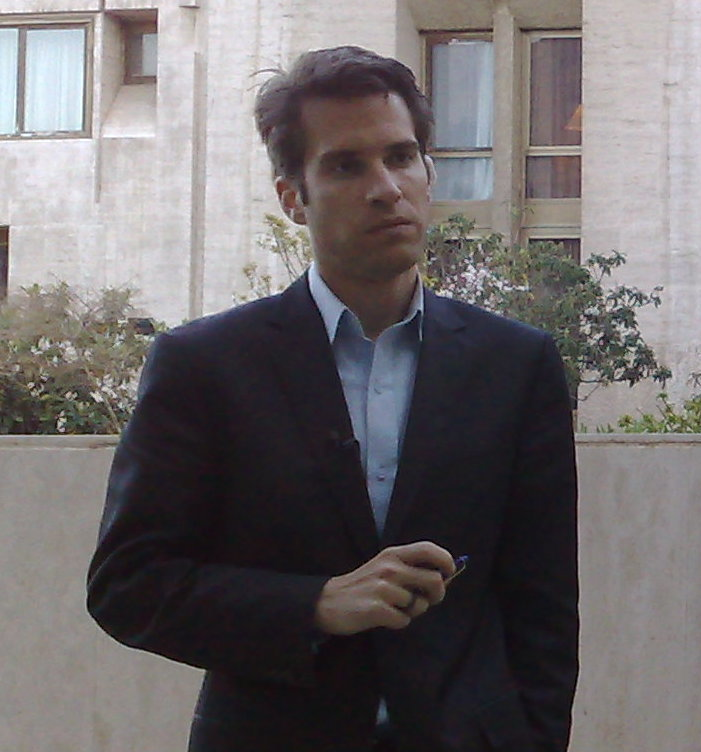
- Perry in 2011
- Born: Cal Perry; October 6, 1979 (age 46); Washington, DC
- Education: Skidmore College (B.A.)
- Notable credit: MSNBC

Cal Perry (born October 6, 1979) is a former broadcast journalist who most recently worked for MSNBC. He previously worked at Voice of America in a senior role and briefly at Al Jazeera English. Before joining Al Jazeera, he worked for many years with CNN, mostly in the Middle East. During this time, he served as: Bureau Chief in Baghdad, Iraq (2005–2007), Bureau Chief in Beirut, Lebanon. From these bases, he also covered the wars in Lebanon (2006), Georgia (2008) and Pakistan (2008), plus the aftermath of the devastating cyclone in Bangladesh, in 2007. In 2022, he joined the Baltimore Orioles as senior vice president and chief content officer.

== Personal ==
His father is Mark Perry, an American author specializing in military, intelligence, and foreign affairs analysis. His mother, Dr. Nina Mikhalevsky, is a Professor of Philosophy at the University of Mary Washington.

== Career ==
Perry's international career began as a program officer for the Vietnam Veterans of America Foundation, serving in Hanoi, the capital of Vietnam. On his return, he was chief researcher at the National Veterans Legal Services Program, in Washington, D.C.

He began his career at CNN as an international assignment editor on the network’s foreign desk in Atlanta, Georgia. As international assignment editor, Perry was responsible for all aspects of network news gathering, coordinating the international coverage for all of CNN’s networks, producing reporter live shots and determining the editorial content for the CNN news packages.

His next assignment was in the field, as a producer in Iraq. Initially an embedded producer in 2003, Perry remained in the country, based in Baghdad, during which time he reported from nearly all of Iraq’s provinces. He covered the U.S. war in Iraq with numerous embeds, which included producing and directing a report on U.S. special operations forces – the first international correspondent to do so. During his time in-country, Perry produced, directed and reported the award-winning CNN documentary "Combat Hospital," an inside look into one of the U.S. military's busiest combat hospitals in Iraq.

In November 2004 Perry organized CNN’s West Bank coverage of the death and funeral of Palestinian President Yasser Arafat, an opportunity which arose from his previous service as press officer for the European Union’s Reconciliation Program, during the Second Palestinian Intifada. In this press officer position, Perry participated in discussions with a broad spectrum of policy-makers on public relations issues relating to the Israel-Palestinian conflict.

Perry and correspondent Karl Penhaul won the Edward R. Murrow award for "Continuing Coverage: CNN, Coverage of the Middle East Conflict" for their coverage of the 2006 war between Israel and Hezbollah. Perry and Penhaul were the first journalists to arrive in Tyre, Lebanon, amid the early fighting in 2006. As one of only a handful of journalist teams present in Southern Lebanon during the first five days of the war, they provided important coverage during the first week of the war. Perry published the article "The True Cost of War" for cnn.com, describing his experiences in Lebanon during that time.

In 2007, Perry was among the first reporters to appear live from Bangladesh during the massive cyclone Sidr providing both on-air coverage and still photographs.

As the CNN liaison for the Middle East and CNN’s bureau chief in Lebanon, Perry conducted a series of first-time interviews with prominent world leaders. In August 2007 he conducted an exclusive interview with the exiled Hamas leader Khaled Meshaal from a safe house in Syria. Perry was one of the first reporters from the Western media to interview Meshaal and published a well-known article entitled "Face to Face with top Hamas Leader in a Secret Location". In 2008, Perry became one of the first reporters in more than three years to interview the President of Syria, Bashar al-Assad in English. Additionally, Perry interviewed Syrian first lady Asma al-Assad in 2009, and Saad Hariri, the Lebanese prime minister, in the first interview with him after his election, in 2008.

In December 2022, Perry, a lifelong Baltimore Orioles fan, joined the club as senior vice president and chief content officer. John P. Angelos, the team's then-chairman and CEO, called Perry a "master storyteller" who would help integrate the team's multimedia content throughout the organization and with its partners.

Perry left the Orioles in early 2025 to pursue other opportunities.

== Awards ==
Perry won an Alfred I. duPont–Columbia University Award for his work in the network's coverage of the capture of Saddam Hussein.

Perry was involved in the reporting that won CNN the "Edward R. Murrow" award for Excellence in Journalism for the network's coverage of the 2006 war between Lebanon and Israel.

== Photography ==
Perry has also worked as a photojournalist and has published a series of exclusive still photographs of combat action with the Marine Corps in Ramadi, Fallujah and other cities in Iraq.
