= Mary Jo Perino =

American sports journalist

Mary Jo Perino-Ford is a former television sports journalist. She was named Kentucky Sportscaster of the Year in 2009 and 2010 and in 2011 was the first woman elected to the board of the National Sportscasters and Sportswriters Association.

== Early life and education ==
Perino was raised in Alexandria, Minnesota. Her grandfather started a television station, and her father worked there, and her interest in becoming an anchor began while she was a child and visiting her father at work.

In 1999, Perino completed her Bachelor’s degree in broadcast journalism from the University of Missouri.

== Career ==
After graduating college, Perino first worked in television as a reporter in Terre Haute, Indiana, eventually also becoming a sports anchor on weekends for a year. She was then hired by the LEX18 sports department in 2002 and was a weekend anchor for four years. In July 2006, Perino joined the CNN Headline News network as a sports anchor. In 2007, she left CNN Headline News and returned to LEX18 as the main sports anchor. Perino was the Sports Director at WLEX in Lexington, Kentucky before leaving in December 2020 for Sema4, a laboratory specializing in women’s health and genetics.

== Personal life ==
Her favorite football team is the Minnesota Vikings. She and her son are also fans of the Kentucky Wildcats.
