= David Chalian =

American journalist

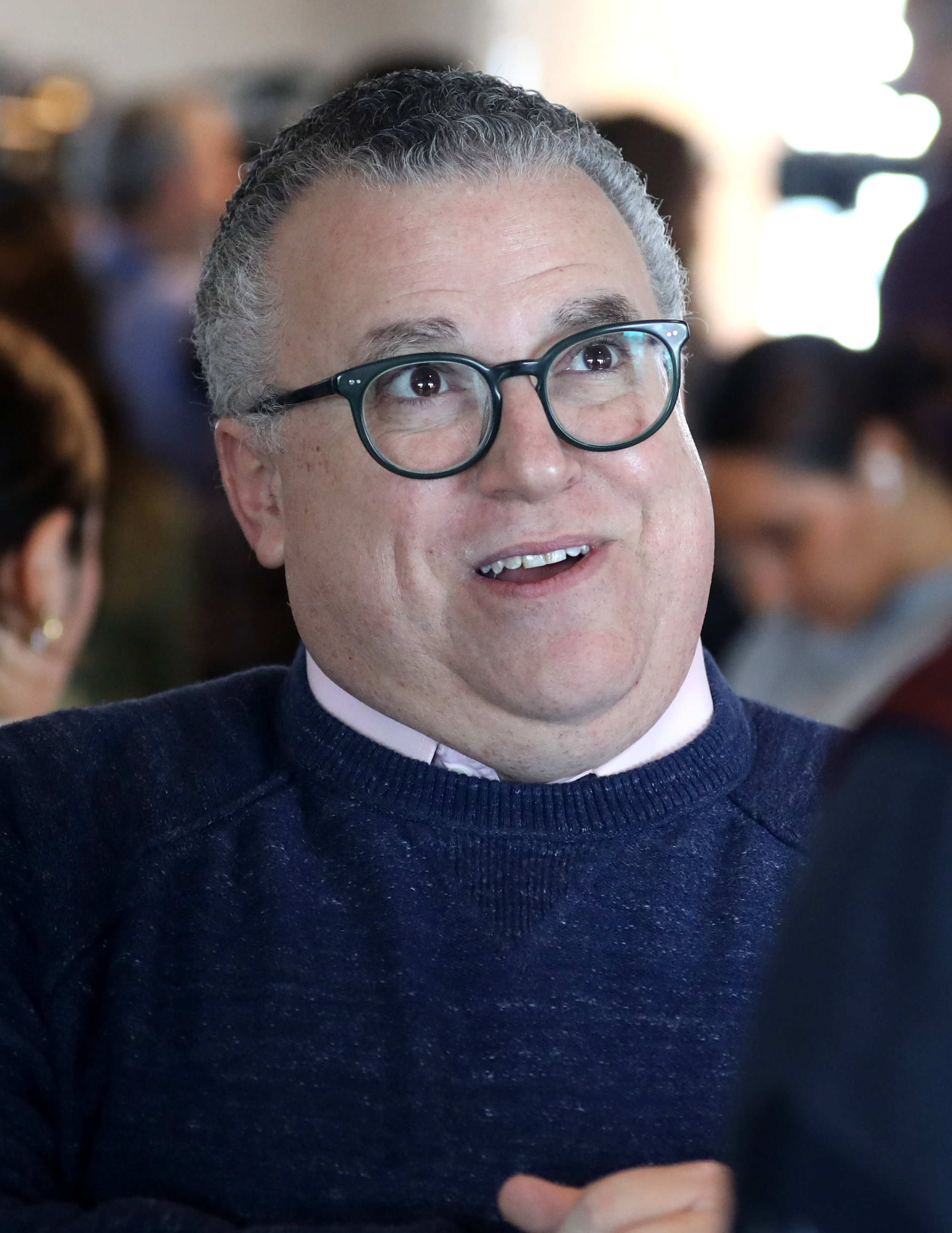
- Chalian in 2024
- Born: David Marc Chalian; July 20, 1973 (age 53)
- Education: Northwestern University (BA)
- Occupations: Washington Bureau Chief, Political Director & Analyst
- Employer: CNN
- Spouse: Justin Tyler Bernstine (m. 2017)

David Marc Chalian (born July 20, 1973) is an American journalist and political analyst who serves as Washington Bureau Chief and Political Director for the American cable news channel CNN.

== Early life and education ==
Chalian was born on July 20, 1973, to Carol (née Steloff) and Robert P. Chalian. His father worked as a salesman before his death in 1984, and was of Armenian Jewish heritage.

Chalian attended Marlboro High School in Marlboro Township, New Jersey, where he participated in the school's performing arts programs and graduated in 1991. He then attended Northwestern University, earning a Bachelor of Science degree.

== Career ==
After graduating from Northwestern, Chalian joined NY1, a 24-hour cable news television channel based in New York City, and having produced the nightly news program, Inside City Hall. He immediately thereafter worked as political director for ABC News and appeared as a political analyst on ABC World News Tonight, Nightline, and Good Morning America. At ABC, he created and co-anchored the daily political webcast, "Top Line". In January 2009, he won an Emmy Award as part of the team that produced ABC News's presidential inauguration coverage. He next worked as the political editor and an on-air political analyst for the PBS NewsHour and then as Vice President for Video Programming at Politico.

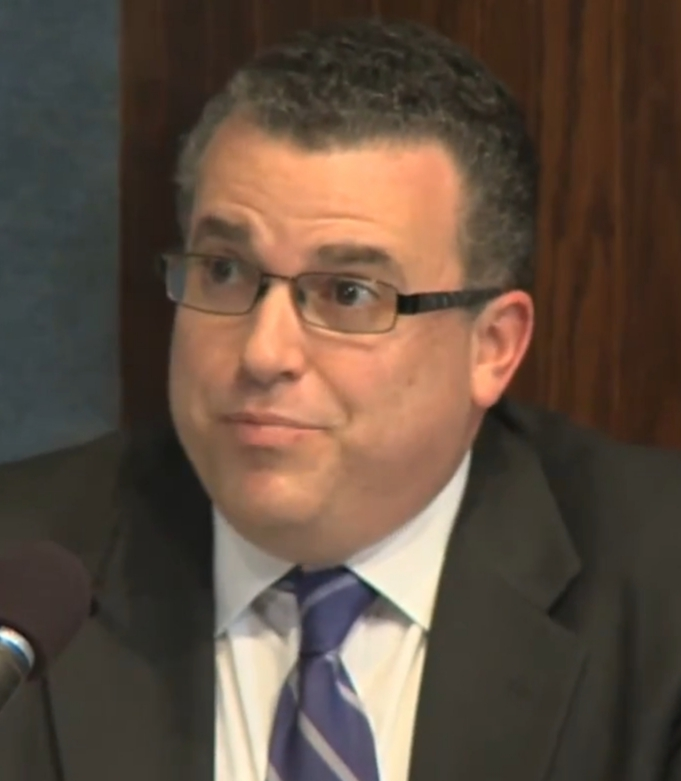
Chalian in 2013

=== Yahoo ===
Chalian served as Yahoo! News' Washington bureau chief, but was fired from that position after he was overheard on a live microphone during an online broadcast from the 2012 Republican National Convention saying that Republican presidential candidate Mitt Romney and his wife Ann Romney were "not concerned at all" and "happy to have a party with black people drowning" during Hurricane Isaac. Chalian later apologized for his remarks, saying, "I am profoundly sorry for making an inappropriate and thoughtless joke. I was commenting on the challenge of staging a convention during a hurricane and about campaign optics. I have apologized to the Romney campaign, and I want to take this opportunity to publicly apologize to Gov. and Mrs. Romney."

=== CNN ===
After Yahoo, he was hired as political director at CNN replacing Mark Preston. In this role, he has overseen the political coverage across all of CNN's platforms. He often appears on-air as a political analyst on New Day and The Situation Room with Wolf Blitzer.

== Personal life ==
Chalian lives in Washington, D.C. He has been married to Justin Tyler Bernstine since 2017. Dr. Bernstine serves as Deputy Dean of Students at American University.
