= Emily Reuben =

British journalist and charity worker

- Occupation(s): Founder and CEO, Duchenne UK, former television journalist and presenter
- Spouse: Nick Crossley
- Children: 3

Emily Elisheva Renee Reuben OBE is a former journalist and a charity worker. She is the co-founder and chief executive of Duchenne UK, a British charity for people affected by Duchenne muscular dystrophy. Before that she was a reporter and presenter on British television's Channel 4 News and later with CNN.

== Biography ==
She previously presented More4 News. In 2004, she married Nick Crossley.

Reuben has three children, including a son who has Duchenne muscular dystrophy and two daughters. Reuben set up the Duchenne Children's Trust, which later merged with charity Joining Jack to form Duchenne UK, a charity aiming to finding better treatments and a cure for the condition.

Reuben was appointed Officer of the Order of the British Empire (OBE) in the 2023 Birthday Honours for services to charity and people with Duchenne muscular dystrophy.
