= Andreas van der Schaaf =

Dutch television presenter

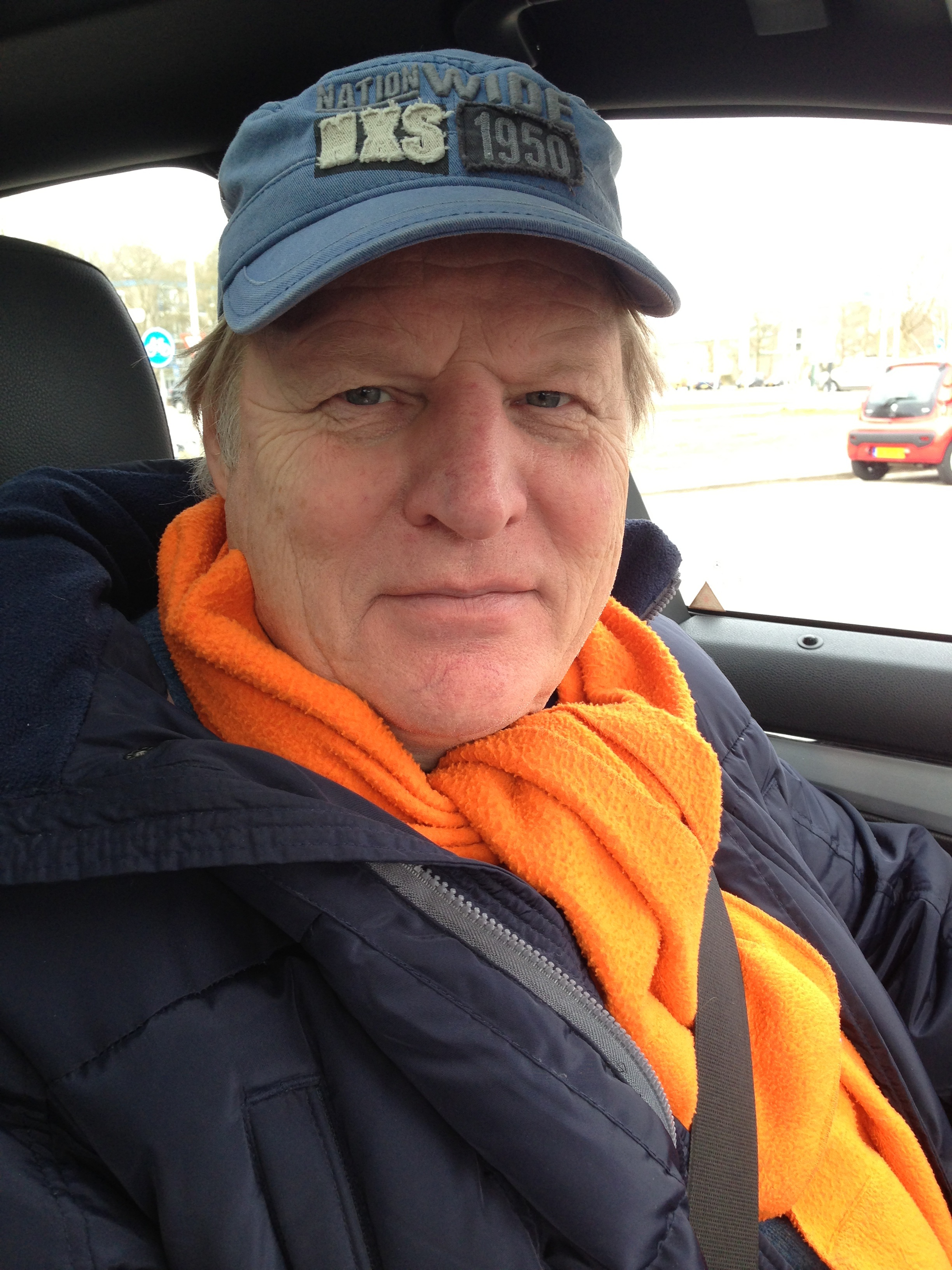
Andreas van der schaaf

Andreas van der Schaaf (The Hague, 27 October 1951) is a Dutch television presenter, producer and program developer. Internationally known for his work as the presenter of First Class Around the World (RTL 5/CNBC) and as international Holland based reporter for CNN World Report.

== Career ==
- 1974-1975: NCRV-TV; Production & program development, Dutch game shows like; Spel zonder grenzen (International European game show),Zo Vader, Zo Zoon (Like Father, Like Son).
- 1977-1978: Actor in Dutch television series "Dagboek van een herdershond" (Diary of a German Shepherd).
- 1976-1978: Copywriter at Ogilvy & Mather Advertising in Amsterdam and Free-Lance TV activities for.; Veronica & TROS TV.
- 1978-1980: Copywriter & Concepts at Young & Rubicam in Amsterdam and for Cato Johnson in Amsterdam.
- 1980–present:Andreas van der Schaaf TV & Video Productions and in 1995 start of Andreas van der Schaaf Creative Enterprises B.V.
- 1979-1980: Presenter of "Live" Quiz": "Teleraadsel" TROS and Creative Director at Young & Rubicam Advertising, Amsterdam.
- 1995-1997: Presenter "First Class Around the World" [RTL 5 The Netherlands [NBC-Supertchannel], broadcast in over 60 countries
- 1998: Presenter of RTL4 TV series; "Vrouwen van het Gooi".
- 2002-2005: Presenter at BVN TV The Netherlands for 'Van Huis Uit' combined with items about Holland for CNN World Report.
- 2006–present:Member of the creative & editorial team of the TROS TV Show at Niehe Media/Media Lane in Amsterdam.
- 2016–present:Counselor for the City of Gooise Meren (for 50PLUS party)
