= Marga Ortigas =

- Born: Margarita Ortigas
- Occupations: Writer, Media Communications Consultant
- Years active: 1991-present

Margarita Ortigas (generally known as Marga Ortigas) is a writer and media communications consultant who previously worked as a correspondent for Al Jazeera English.

== Career ==
Marga Ortigas is a writer, journalist, and media professional who blogs and does consulting work. She has over 25 years experience in broadcasting in Asia, Europe, and the Middle East.

=== Early work ===
Ortigas began her career as a news anchor, reporter and producer at ABS-CBN and GMA Network, in the Philippines.

=== CNN International ===
Ortigas was a field producer, editor, and reporter with CNN International news based in London from 2000 to 2005 and spent considerable time in Baghdad and the Middle East on assignment.

=== Al Jazeera English ===
Ortigas was the Senior Asia correspondent for Al Jazeera English, travelling the region extensively for 11 years. She covered all aspects including the growth of China, tensions on the Korean peninsula, cross-border and internal conflicts among ASEAN states, and the many natural disasters around Asia. She also reported extensively on both the aftermath of Super Typhoon Haiyan in the Philippines in 2013, and the Great East Japan quake in 2011.

Ortigas is one of the original correspondents of Al Jazeera English, having joined the channel at its inception in 2005.

A multi-media story-teller, she is on Twitter, Facebook, and other platforms. She also maintains a blog on www.i-migrant.com

In 2011, Ortigas was recognised by the International Committee of the Red Cross for Humanitarian Reporting.

== Early life ==
Ortigas was educated at Ateneo de Manila University where she studied journalism and communications, and at the University of Greenwich (UK) where she gained a Masters in Literature as a British Council Chevening scholar. In addition to English, she speaks Spanish and Tagalog.

== Filmography ==
- 1991-1996: GMA News Live (GMA Network)
- 1992-1996: GMA Network News (GMA Network)
