= Allison Gollust =

American media executive

Allison Gollust (born October 2, 1972) is an American media executive. She worked as an executive vice president and the chief marketing officer of CNN Worldwide until February 2022. Gollust was director of communications for Andrew Cuomo from October 2012 to March 2013.

== Career ==
Gollust worked as a news anchor, reporter, and producer in Denver, Colorado. In 1997, she became a senior publicist for the Today show. Gollust later led communications for MSNBC, NBC News, CNBC, and The Weather Channel. She became a chief spokeswoman and executive vice president of corporate communications at NBCUniversal.

In October 2012, New York governor Andrew Cuomo named Gollust as his communications director, replacing Richard Bamberger. She left her role on March 1, 2013 to join CNN Worldwide. In February 2022, Gollust resigned from CNN after a probe found she had violated company policies.

=== CNN ===
Gollust was the executive vice-president and chief marketing officer at CNN. In February 2021, Gollust was seen as a candidate to succeed Jeff Zucker if he stepped down as the CNN president. On February 3, 2022, Rolling Stone, citing an anonymous source, reported that Gollust and Zucker advised governor Andrew Cuomo on how to respond to Donald Trump's criticisms of Cuomo. This appeared to breach journalistic ethics. On February 15, 2022, Jason Kilar, the CEO of CNN parent company WarnerMedia, stated in a memo that Gollust resigned from CNN after a WarnerMedia commissioned investigation "performed by a third-party law firm and led by a former federal judge" found that she violated "Company policies, including CNN’s News Standards and Practices." The investigation was "commissioned in September" and concluded the weekend before she resigned.

== Personal life ==
In 2013, Gollust lived in Manhattan with her husband and two daughters. Gollust and her husband divorced in 2015.

=== Relationship with Jeff Zucker ===
In February 2022, Gollust and Zucker announced that they had a public and personal relationship that had turned romantic. Despite claiming that her sexual relationship with the CNN president developed in the past two or three years by that point in time, allegedly due to the COVID-19 pandemic, many media personalities repudiated this claim of hers as a "lie" by saying that their controversial relationship had been known for far longer than that. For example, in her 2021 memoir book titled Going There, Katie Couric asserts that both Gollust and Zucker had engaged in "inappropriate behavior" that was an "open secret" for nearly ten years. It is believed by many people that their controversial relationship began as an extramarital affair.
