= JJ Ramberg =

American writer and businesswoman

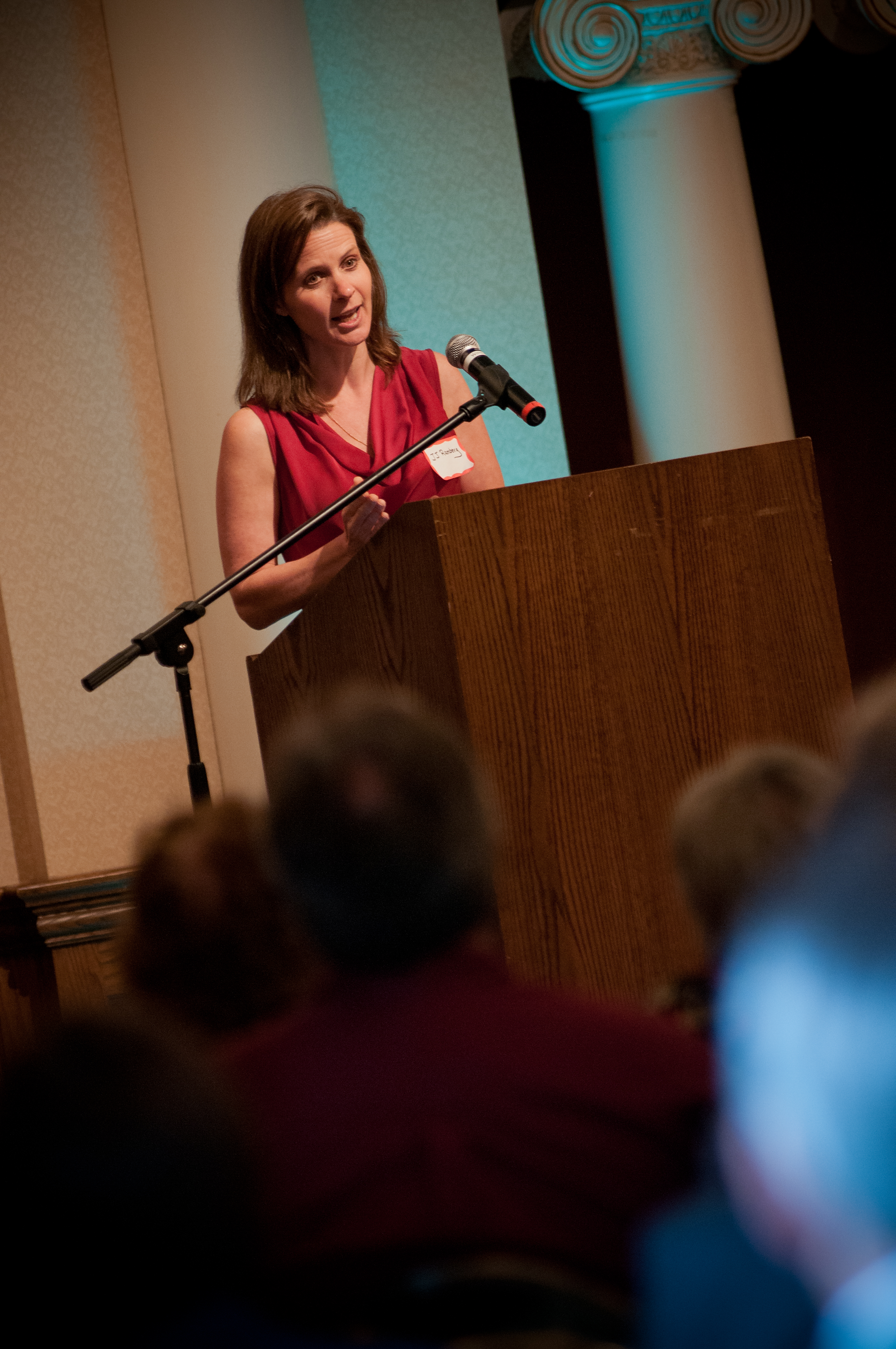
- J. J. Ramberg in 2012
- Born: Jennifer Jill Ramberg
- Education: Duke University (B.A.); Stanford Business School (M.B.A.)
- Occupation: Television news host
- Spouse: Scott Glass
- Children: 3

Jennifer Jill "JJ" Ramberg is an entrepreneur, author, and television news host. She previously hosted MSNBC's weekend business program Your Business, which aired Sunday mornings at 7:30 ET with repeats on the following Saturday at 5:30 a.m.

== Biography ==
Ramberg was born to a Jewish family the daughter of Constance "Connie" (née Rudow) and Max Ramberg. She is a third-generation entrepreneur, with her paternal grandfather immigrating to the United States from Mexico first working as a peddler of pots and pans before opening a furniture store, a storage business, a document storage business, and a real estate firm; her father expanded the businesses. Her maternal grandfather founded numerous companies including a tropical fish company, a tire distribution company, and was the first person to bring frozen pizza to California. In 1988, her mother and brother, Ken, founded JOBTRAK, a job listing and resume database for college students, which they sold to Monster.com in 2000.

In 1992, Ramberg graduated cum laude from Duke University with a bachelor of arts degree in English. She graduated with an MBA from Stanford Business School. In November 2005, Ramberg and her brother Ken founded the charitable search engine GoodSearch.

Ramberg began her television career at NBC News, where she was an associate producer for Dateline NBC. Ramberg next joined CNN as a business reporter, covering the floor of the New York Stock Exchange. She also hosted the daytime talk program The Flipside on CNNfn. In 2006, Ramberg moved to MSNBC and began hosting Your Business. The program aired its last episode in December 2018, one month after Ramberg announced her departure. Concurrent with her tenure at MSNBC, she hosted the podcast Been There Built That.

== Personal life ==
Ramberg is married to architect Scott Glass; the couple lives in Brooklyn with their three children.

== Works ==
- Ramberg, JJ; Everson, Lisa; Silverstein, Fred (2012). It's Your Business: 183 Essential Tips that Will Transform Your Small Business. Business Plus. ISBN 978-1-455-50900-3.
