= Isabel Bucaram =

Ecuadorian businesswoman

- Born: Guayaquil, Ecuador
- Education: Universidad Católica de Santiago de Guayaquil; Florida International University
- Employer: CNN en Español

Isabel María Bucaram Layana, better known as Isabel Bucaram, is the director of VIP planning production, public relations and marketing liaison for CNN en Español. In 2019, Francis Suarez, the mayor of Miami, proclaimed the day of October 10, 2019, as "The Day of Isabel Bucaram in the City of Miami". In 2022, Bucaram was named as one of The 100 Women to KNOW Across America, By The KNOW Women.

== Biography ==
Bucaram was born in Guayaquil, Ecuador. She moved to the United States in 1997. Bucaram graduated from the Universidad Católica de Santiago de Guayaquil with a bachelor's degree in economics and a master's degree in investigative journalism from Florida International University. She joined CNN en Español as the director of public relations in 2010. Prior to CNN, Bucaram served as the Marketing and Communications Director for the Spanish Broadcasting System. In 2011, she was awarded a proclamation by the Municipality of Guayaquil for her contributions. In 2016, she received an award in the US for covering the 2016 Ecuador earthquake. Bucaram was also a member of the CNN team that received Peabody Award for coverage of the Deepwater Horizon oil spill in 2010 and the Arab Spring in 2011. Bucaram was a part of the CNN en Español team that won an Emmy award for the Interview in Spanish with “Gerardo Gaya: Padre coraje a la Mexicana”.
