= Nia-Malika Henderson =

American political journalist

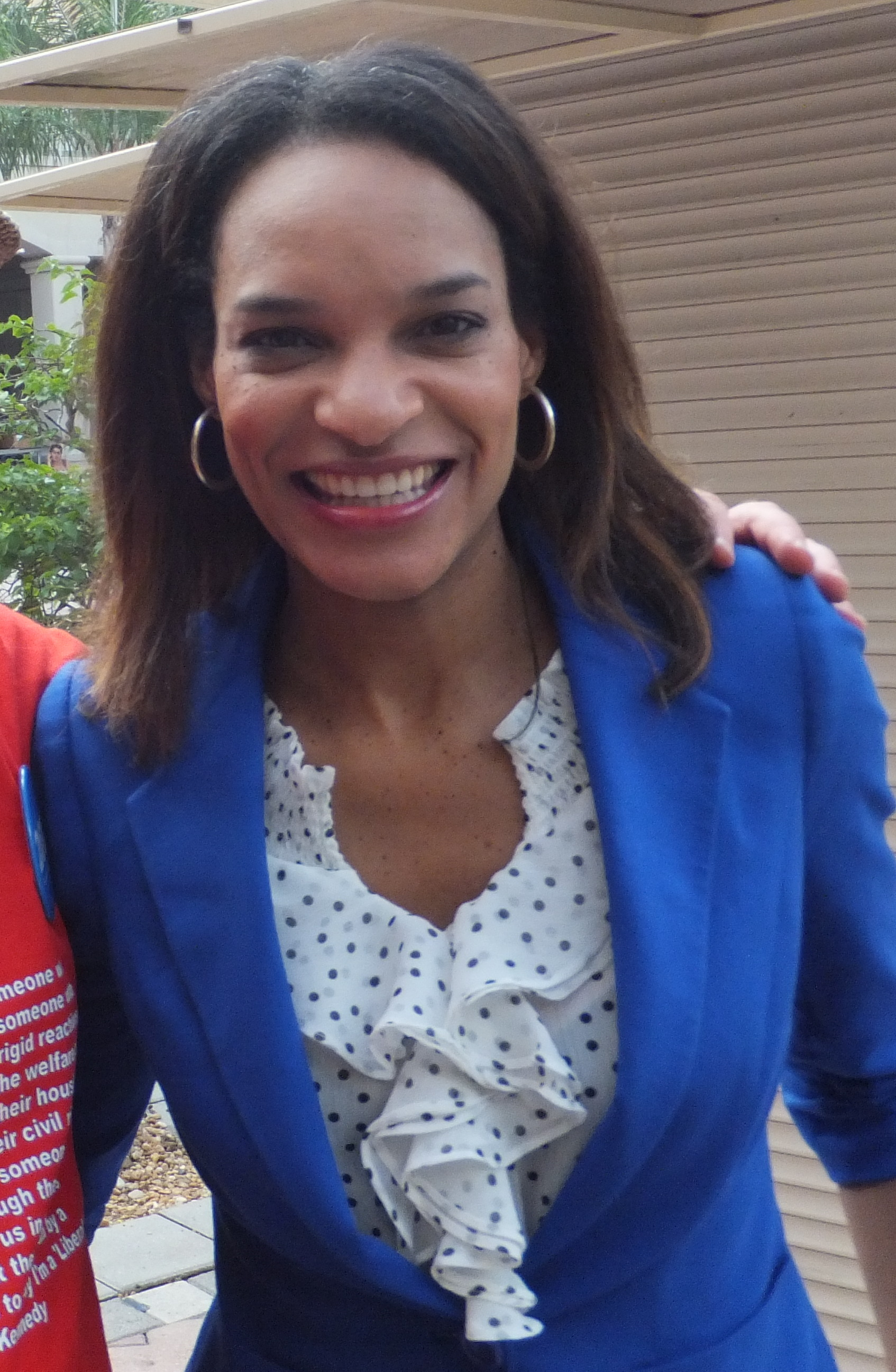
- Henderson in 2012
- Born: July 7, 1974 (age 52); Hopkins, South Carolina, U.S.
- Education: Lower Richland High School, Hopkins, South Carolina
- Alma mater: Duke University (B.A.); Yale University (M.A.); Columbia University (M.A.)
- Occupations: Journalist, columnist

Nia-Malika Henderson (born July 7, 1974) is an American journalist. She is a columnist at Bloomberg and a senior political analyst for CNN. She reported broadly on the 2016 campaign for CNN's digital and television platforms, with a special focus on identity politics—exploring the dynamics of demographics, race, and religion, and reporting on the groups of people who help shape national elections.

== Early life and education ==
Nia-Malika Henderson was born to African-American parents in Hopkins, South Carolina on July 7, 1974. Both of her parents were civil rights activists, and her father marched with Martin Luther King, Jr. in Alabama. Henderson says that some of her earliest memories are about their efforts to have the Confederate flag removed from the state capitol building in nearby Columbia, South Carolina. She attended Lower Richland High School, graduating in 1992.

Henderson went on to graduate cum laude from Duke University with a bachelor's degree in literature and cultural anthropology. She then earned master's degrees from Yale University in American studies and from Columbia University in journalism.

== Career ==
Henderson began her career writing for The Baltimore Sun and then for Newsday's national staff where she was its lead reporter covering Barack Obama's 2008 campaign, the Democratic primary race and the Democratic National Convention. She also covered the first two years of the Obama administration for Politico.

From 2010 to 2015, Henderson served as a reporter at The Washington Post. As national political reporter for the Post, she covered the White House, the 2012 presidential campaign, the 2010 mid-term elections and anchored the Post's Election 2012 blog.

In 2015, Henderson joined CNN as senior political reporter and anchor. She is also Bloomberg's politics and policy columnist.

== Personal life ==
Henderson married her long-time girlfriend, a doctor, in late 2019.
