= Matthew Chance =

British journalist (born 1970)

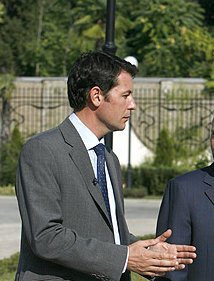
- Chance in 2008
- Born: Matthew Gerald Chance; 14 March 1970 (age 56)
- Occupation: Journalist
- Employer: CNN (2001–present)

Matthew Gerald Chance (born 14 March 1970) is a British journalist working for CNN as the network's Chief Global Affairs Correspondent.

== Career ==
Before joining CNN, Chance was a freelance journalist based in Asia.

Chance joined CNN in October 2001, replacing correspondent Steve Harrigan in Northern Afghanistan after Harrigan left CNN for Fox News Channel while on assignment.

Over the past two decades, he has covered the fall of Kabul to the Northern Alliance in Afghanistan in 2001, the invasion of Iraq by Coalition forces in 2003, the Beslan school hostage crisis, the 2005 London bombings, Russia under President Vladimir Putin's leadership, the 2008 South Ossetia war and the Russian invasion of Ukraine.

In August 2008, Chance interviewed Vladimir Putin, who was then serving as Prime Minister of Russia.

Chance was one of the journalists held by forces of Colonel Gaddafi at the Rixos al Nasr hotel in Tripoli, Libya, in August 2011. He reported by Twitter throughout the ordeal, and was live on CNN as the International Committee of the Red Cross finally evacuated the detainees.

Chance returned to London after the Libyan Civil War, and reported from Italy on the resignation of prime minister Silvio Berlusconi in 2011 as well as the release of Amanda Knox from a prison in Perugia that same year. He reported from Greece on the Greek government-debt crisis, and from the International Atomic Energy Agency in Vienna on the nuclear program of Iran.

He also reported on natural disasters, including the 2004 Indian Ocean earthquake and the 2005 Pakistan earthquake.

In 2022, Chance reported on the Russian invasion of Ukraine and witnessed Russian paratroopers at Antonov Airport.

In November 2026, Chance sued Borough Market in London for slipping on greasy food waste in December 2022 and broke his ankle. He is seeking £1.6 million.
