= Kevin Madden =

American public relations expert

- Born: March 2, 1972 (age 54)^{[note 1]} New York, U.S.
- Education: State University of New York, Morrisville (attended); State University of New York, Cortland (BA)
- Political party: Republican
- Spouse: Jaclyn Norris

Kevin Madden (born March 2, 1972)^{[note 1]} is an American pundit or public relations professional in newspapers and magazines and appears regularly on television news and talk shows, largely on cable news programming in the United States. He was a senior advisor to and spokesman for Mitt Romney's failed 2012 U.S. presidential campaign.

== Professional history ==
After graduating from college in 1994, Madden went to work for the Yonkers City Council, working for Councilman Carlo DiNota. He soon became the spokesman for family friend John Spencer's successful 1996 Yonkers mayoral campaign. After helping Spencer win re-election, Madden moved to Washington, D.C. and, beginning in 2001, became senior policy advisor and chief spokesman for Congressman John E. Sweeney.

By the mid 2000s, Madden had had several public relations positions for Republicans in federal government, including as press secretary for House Republican leadership (including then-Majority Leader Tom DeLay and then-Majority Leader John Boehner); as press spokesman for the George W. Bush presidential campaign, 2004; and as one of a handful of national spokespersons and Deputy Director of Public Affairs for the George W. Bush administration Department of Justice. In 2003, the Irish Voice described Madden's growing stature in the GOP as "further proof of the heavy influence New York Irish Americans have in the Republican party". By 2006, U.S. News & World Report referred to Madden as "battle-tested", and alluded to each of his high-profile public relations organizations (first for Attorney General Alberto Gonzales and then for House Republican leadership) as "a lean operation, an intense focus, and a positive message".

Madden began working for Mitt Romney's 2008 presidential campaign in 2007, soon with the joint titles 'National Press Secretary' and 'Senior Communications Strategist'. Although John McCain won the Republican (GOP) nomination, a Los Angeles Times discussion of Romney's unsuccessful 2008 primary campaign noted, "his media operation CANNOT rank among the problems. Anchored by Kevin Madden -- a savvy and telegenic GOP spokesman -- the press shop was hard-working, well-organized and quick-off-the-mark." Also discussing the 2008 campaigns, The Belfast Telegraph opined that Madden (and Matt Rhoades) "have built the most sophisticated of all the press operations... Madden, in particular, is genuinely liked and respected by the press".

The following election cycle, Kevin Madden joined Mitt Romney's 2012 presidential campaign. As Romney was securing the nomination in July 2012, ABC News described Madden as "a face of the campaign" and as "a more visible member of the candidate's campaign staff". In August 2012, Politico reported that "Romney is hardly preoccupied with his transition just yet – but...Kevin Madden, traveling spokesman on the campaign plane, would be expected to be named White House spokesman". Following Romney's 2012 loss, Madden pointed to immigration in particular as "a missed opportunity for Romney".

Between the 2008 and 2012 campaigns, Madden was hired as a Managing Director with The Glover Park Group, a public affairs firm in Washington D.C., before joining Charleston, South Carolina public affairs firm JDA Frontline in March 2010 to launch and direct their Washington, DC operations. Following the 2012 elections, Madden resumed daily responsibilities as JDA's 'Executive Vice President of Public Affairs'.

=== Media appearances ===
Kevin Madden has appeared on dozens of episodes of many political discussion programs on American cable news programs. His profile at a speaker agency states: "Madden is regularly called upon to serve as a commentator on the media and politics on network news shows as well as CNN, Fox News Channel, MSNBC, CNBC, Bloomberg and the BBC among others. He has also published political commentary in exclusive venues, such as the opinion sections of The New York Times and The Wall Street Journal." Appearances include: Hardball with Chris Matthews, Larry King Live, Verdict with Dan Abrams, The Situation Room, Meet the Press and Morning Joe

Madden appeared in the 2008 documentary film The Return of the War Room, a sequel to The War Room, a 1993 documentary about the 1992 U.S. presidential election.

In April 2013, The Hollywood Reporter reported that Kevin Madden was being considered for the proposed relaunch of CNN's Crossfire; the program had been off the air since 2005.

== Personal life ==
Madden alludes to his childhood in Yonkers, New York, when he describes himself as "A simple city boy – you might say a cockeyed optimist – mixed up in the high stakes game of world diplomacy and international intrigue...." U.S. News referred to Madden as "a Yankees fan" and an "Irishman"; his County Galway-born father and County Tyrone-born mother emigrated from Ireland in the early 1960s. Madden told the Houston Chronicle that his father, an auto mechanic, read three newspapers each Sunday and enjoyed discussing news and politics; he told Politico, "I grew up in a household where it was a sin to sit in silence without an opinion.... Makes sense that I went into politics, my sister chose journalism, and my brother is a lawyer."

Raised as a Roman Catholic, Madden attended and was graduated from a parochial Roman Catholic school, then from Morrisville State College in 1992, and earned an undergraduate degree in communication studies from the State University of New York at Cortland in 1994. On November 22, 2003, Madden married Jaclyn Norris (of Pittsburgh), then legislative director for Congressman Ric Keller and former intern for Senator Rick Santorum; Harper's Magazine described Norris as "strikingly beautiful". Norris continued employment in a range of Congressional staff assignments until 2007.

By 2010, the couple had three sons. Several reports from Romney's 2008 campaign repeat an anecdote from November 2007, describing Madden's then twenty-month-old son "strutting about with a Blackberry, jabbering nonsense and punching away at the keys. "I was so heartbroken," [Madden] quipped... "I wanted my kid to be a football star, not a national press secretary."" Madden cites his "pro-life" identification as one reason for his affiliation as a Republican.

=== Accolades ===
In a 2008 article about several District of Columbia communications professionals, the UK's The Independent noted, "Madden, in particular, is genuinely liked and respected". Also in 2008, the Washington Post stated, "Madden attracts comments about his matinee-idol looks." In 2006, The Hill, a newspaper focusing on Congress, ranked Kevin Madden as second on their "50 Most Beautiful" list, an honor Madden himself compared with "sitting in a dunk tank for a year". Despite Madden's work for right-leaning Republicans, even those leaning left such as The Raw Story columnist and editor Megan Carpentier have opined, "There's no denying he's pretty." When Howard Kurtz asked Madden about his looks in 2008, Madden replied, "I'm married and have two boys. My wife wants to make sure I mention that more often."

== Criticism of Sarah Palin ==
In a television interview days before the November 2008 election, Madden pointed at a wardrobe matter as "an indication just how unseasoned Sarah Palin is as a national candidate"; TownHall.com characterized Madden's comments as "trashing" and "particularly harsh on Palin", the GOP's Vice Presidential nominee for the 2008 election. Also during her 2008 campaign, Erick Erickson claimed "one of the biggest pushers of anti-Palin stories...was Romney spokeshack Kevin Madden".

== Footnotes ==
^[note 1] Sources indicate a March 2 date. On February 11, 2008, The Washington Post reported that Madden was 35 years old; by October 27, 2008, Jezebel.com reported Madden's age as "36, give or take".
