= Dewey Square Group =

American political consulting firm

The Dewey Square Group
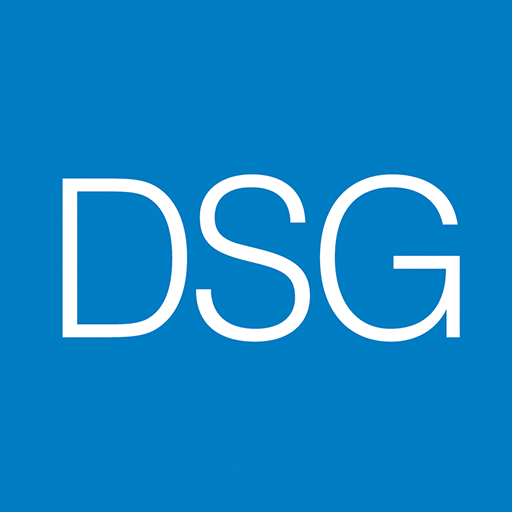
- Type: Privately held company
- Industry: Public Affairs
- Founded: 1992; 34 years ago in Boston
- Founders: Charlie Baker, Chuck Campion, and Michael Whouley
- Headquarters: Washington, D.C. Boston; Sacramento; St. Louis; Tampa, United States
- Area served: United States
- Key people: Michael Whouley (CEO), Maria Cardona
- Services: Lobbying
- Parent: WPP
- Website: www.deweysquare.com

The Dewey Square Group (DSG) is an American political consulting firm based in Washington, D.C. By 2005, DSG had revenues of $12.5 million and gross assets of $2.9 million. In August 2006, the company was bought by the WPP Group.

== History ==
The Dewey Square Group was founded in 1992 by political strategists Charlie Baker, Chuck Campion and Michael Whouley in Boston. Whouley served as the field director for President Bill Clinton's 1992 presidential campaign.

In 2022, the political lobbying firm had offices in Boston. In 2026, the firm's website listed co-founder Charlie Baker as president.

== Clients ==
Clients include Lyft, McDonald's, MGM Springfield, Sony Pictures, the Special Olympics and the Ultimate Fighting Championship.
