= Sara Murray (journalist) =

Former CNN political reporter

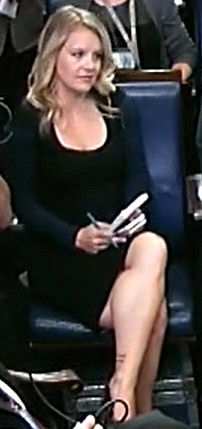
- Murray at 2017 White House press briefing
- Born: March 31, 1985 (age 41); Mount Pleasant, Michigan, U.S.
- Education: University of Maryland (BA)
- Occupations: Consultant, former journalist
- Spouse: Garrett Haake (m. 2017; div. 2019)

Sara Murray (born March 31, 1985) is an American cybersecurity consultant and former journalist who worked as a political correspondent for CNN.

== Life and career ==
Murray was born and raised in Mount Pleasant, Michigan, and graduated in 2007 from the Philip Merrill College of Journalism of the University of Maryland. After school, she moved to New York City and worked for the Wall Street Journal, where she covered the 2008 financial crisis, and then covered Mitt Romney's 2012 presidential campaign, and later served as the anchor for the WSJ digital network. In 2015, she accepted a position with CNN as a political correspondent where she covered Republican candidates in the 2016 and 2020 presidential campaigns. President Donald Trump, complaining to CNN anchor Chris Cuomo that she never reported on his crowd sizes, called her "unemotional", "low-key" and "terrible". Cuomo defended her reporting and posted later on Twitter that Sara Murray is a "pro/ needs no consolation or defense." Murray left CNN in January 2025 to become FTI Consulting's cybersecurity managing co-director.

== Personal life ==
In April 2017, she married MSNBC correspondent Garrett Haake in Austin, Texas. They have since divorced. Murray lives in Washington, D.C.
