= Jamal Simmons =

American political advisor

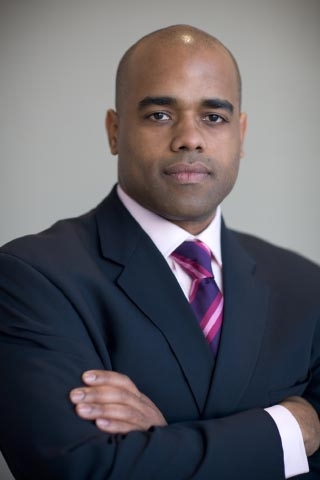

Communications Director for the Vice President
- In office January 9, 2022 – January 5, 2023
- Vice President: Kamala Harris
- Preceded by: Ashley Etienne
- Succeeded by: William Martin

Personal details
- Born: Jamal Nkosi Simmons
- Party: Democratic
- Spouses: Lynn Monique Jollivette (m. 1998; div. 2000); Jewel James (m. 2016)
- Education: Morehouse College (BA); Harvard University (MPP)

Jamal Nkosi Simmons is an American political advisor who formerly served as the communications director for Vice President Kamala Harris from January 2022 to January 2023.

== Early life and education ==
A native of Detroit, Simmons attended Cass Technical High School. He earned a Bachelor of Arts degree in history from Morehouse College and a Master of Public Policy from the Harvard Kennedy School.

== Career ==
Simmons worked for Carolyn Cheeks Kilpatrick and served as an advisor to Max Cleland. In 1992, Simmons worked as a press assistant on the Bill Clinton 1992 presidential campaign. From 1993 to 1995, he served as a press assistant in the Office of the United States Trade Representative. In 1996 and 1997, he served as a special assistant to Commerce Secretary Mickey Kantor. He also worked in the Office of Scheduling and Advance. After leaving the Clinton administration, Simmons briefly worked at Citigroup and United Technologies. In 1999 and 2000, he served as chief of staff for Congresswoman Carolyn Cheeks Kilpatrick. He also worked as deputy communications director for the Al Gore 2000 presidential campaign.

He later worked as deputy director of communications for the Democratic National Committee and communications director for Max Cleland's 2002 re-election campaign for the United States Senate. Simmons then worked as press secretary for the Bob Graham 2004 presidential campaign and traveling press secretary for the Wesley Clark 2004 presidential campaign. He was a senior vice president at the Walker Marchant Group before establishing his own consulting firm. Simmons was also a principal at the Raben Group. He has been featured as a political commentator for CBS News, NPR, MSNBC, CNN, and The Hill. In 2009, Washington Life magazine named Simmons as one of its most influential people under 40.

== Personal life ==
Simmons married Lynn Monique Jollivette in 1998 and they divorced in 2000. He married Jewel James in 2016. They reside in Washington, D.C., with their son and daughter.
