= David Swerdlick =

American journalist

- Born: David Swerdlick
- Education: University of California, Berkeley (BA); University of North Carolina at Chapel Hill (JD)
- Occupation: Journalist
- Spouse: Asila Calhoun

David Swerdlick is an American journalist who is currently an editor at The New York Times.

== Biography ==
Swerdlick was born in Brooklyn but was raised in the San Francisco Bay Area. His father is Jewish and his mother is African American. He earned a B.A from U.C. Berkeley, followed by a J.D. degree from the University of North Carolina Law School. After school he worked as an associate editor for The Root. In 2012, Swerdlick wrote for the New York Daily News's election blog "The Rumble" and also freelanced for various newspapers and magazines. In 2015, he accepted a position as an editor of The Washington Post. Swerdlick is married to Asila Calhoun. He is a frequent political commentator on CNN.
