= Nick Wrenn =

English businessman and journalist

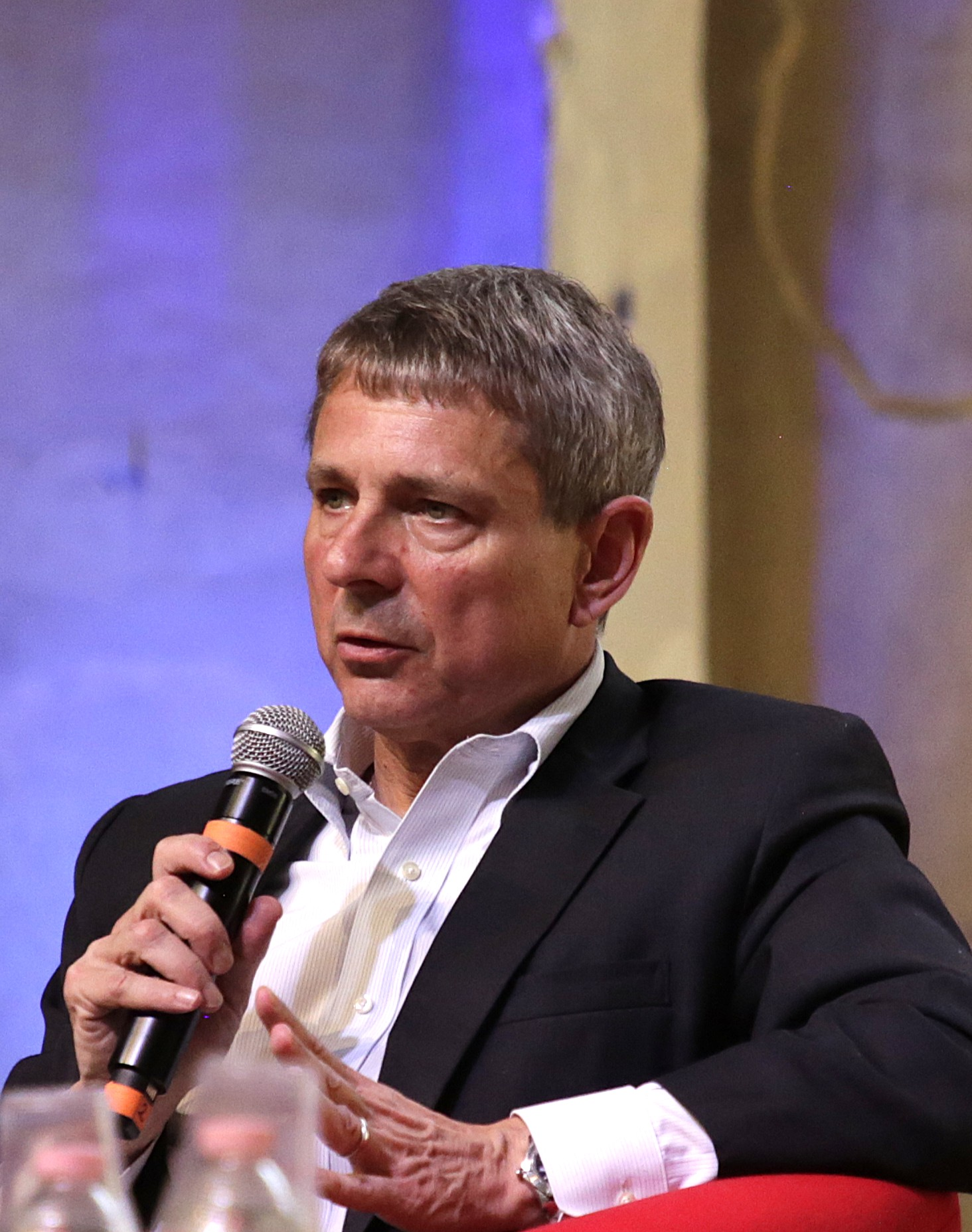
- Nick Wrenn, British investigative journalist, at the 2026 International Journalism Festival.
- Born: United Kingdom
- Occupation: Journalist
- Years active: 1990-present

Nick Wrenn was born in the United Kingdom and is Vice President of Programming and Events at CNBC International. His career in the UK and US included being Vice President of Digital Services for CNN International. Nick Wrenn also worked at Facebook as a Head of News Partnerships for Europe Middle East & Africa.

== Career ==
Wrenn started his career in 1990 as a newspaper reporter in England for Southern Newspapers. From 1996 to 1997 he worked for United Press International as a freelance reporter. In 1997 he started working for Reuters as a freelance reporter. He joined the BBC in 1997 till 2000 as an Assistant Director, he was a member of the team that launched and grew the BBC News website.

Wrenn joined CNN in 2003 as a Managing Editor. From 2008 to 2014 he was appointed as a Vice President of CNN International Digital Services. He then joined Facebook in 2014 and as of 2020 is Head of News Partnerships program for EMEA.
