= Eileen Hsieh =

Eileen Hsieh (繁體: 謝雅琳, 简体:谢雅琳) is a bilingual journalist and blogger based in London, and the former host of CNN's weekly Chinese news program which ran from 2009–2011.

In April 2009 CNN launched its first-ever Mandarin program on CNN.com, using traditional Chinese characters.

== Life and career ==
Hsieh was born in Taiwan and speaks fluent English and Mandarin.

She joined CNN in 2000 when her focus was on international news, including CNN's coverage of the Iraq war in 2003 and the 2004 U.S. presidential election.

In December 2006, she was in Baghdad for Saddam Hussein's execution. In December 2008 she went to Athens, Greece to cover the 2008 Greek riots.

She launched CNN's first Chinese news program in April 2009, a weekly news review available on CNN.com. She's also been awarded two Peabody Award for journalism excellence.
