= Doug James (journalist) =

Canadian journalist

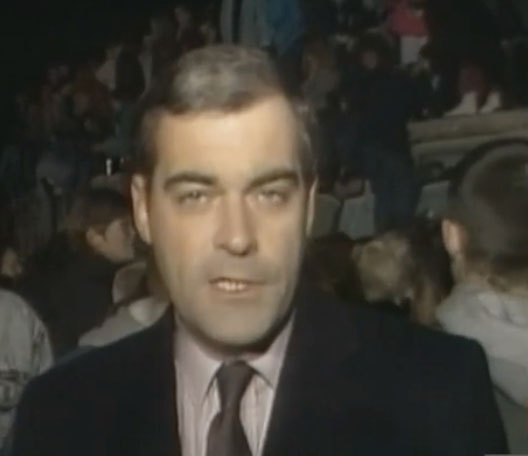
Doug James reports on the fall of the Berlin Wall for CNN.

Doug James is a Canadian journalist, best known for his work as a foreign correspondent for CNN where he covered the Gulf War, the Palestinian Intifada and the fall of the Berlin Wall. Before joining CNN, he was a correspondent for the CBC flagship current affairs program, The Journal.

After returning to Canada in the early 1990s, he anchored CBC Newsworld Business News. Later he worked as a technology reporter for CNBC Europe and as managing editor of CanadaInvest.com, a financial website based in Toronto and HealthyOntario.com which, under his editorial leadership, won numerous awards, including a Webby for Best Government website from the International Academy of Digital Arts and Sciences. He has also taught media law and ethics at the university level.

Doug is currently semi-retired in his hometown of Saint John, New Brunswick, where he dabbles in audiobook narration, with close to 100 titles to his credit.
