= Tumi Makgabo =

South African television presenter

Tumi Makgabo (born c. 1974/75) is a South African television presenter. From 2000 to 2005 she was a current affairs presenter at Cable News Network (CNN) International and anchor of its Inside Africa programme interviewing among others Thabo Mbeki, George W. Bush, Shimon Peres and Oprah Winfrey. She was based at the headquarters in Atlanta. Before that, she had worked for SABC.

After CNN she returned to her home country to help prepare for the upcoming soccer world cup. From 2006 to 2008, she was head of communications and international relations at the 2010 LOC ( Local Organising Committee) but abruptly quit on February 8 without giving reasons.

== Career ==
Tumi Makgabo has been a broadcaster for more than a decade both in South Africa and as anchor and co-producer of 'Inside Africa' at the global news network CNN International's headquarters in Atlanta, US. In 2006, she established her production company, 'Tumi & Co.', which produced ‘Talk with Tumi Makgabo’ for M-Net and continues to produce long-form and documentary content for broadcast and in-house use. Her company also runs media skills development programmes for corporates as well as individuals.

Until early 2008, Makgabo was the International Affairs and Communications Manager and spokesperson for the 2010 FIFA World Cup Organising Committee South Africa and in the same year she was selected to join the World Economic Forum's Forum of Young Global Leaders.

Makgabo has also served as a speaker and commentator on broadcasting and media in Africa for global organisations including the United Nations Development Fund, the European Commission, The World Economic Forum, Kofi Annan's Association for a Green Revolution in Africa and the IUCN.

Makgabo holds several board positions including South African Tourism, Sun International and is a newly appointed member of the Global Agenda Council on the Gender Gap. In recognition of her work in broadcasting, Makgabo is a recipient of an Eagle Award, a Rapport City Press Prestige Award, a DuPont Award as well as the African People's Intercontinental Broadcaster of the Year Award amongst others.

Makgabo is one of the directors at Foschini Group (TFG)
