= Dylan Byers =

American journalist

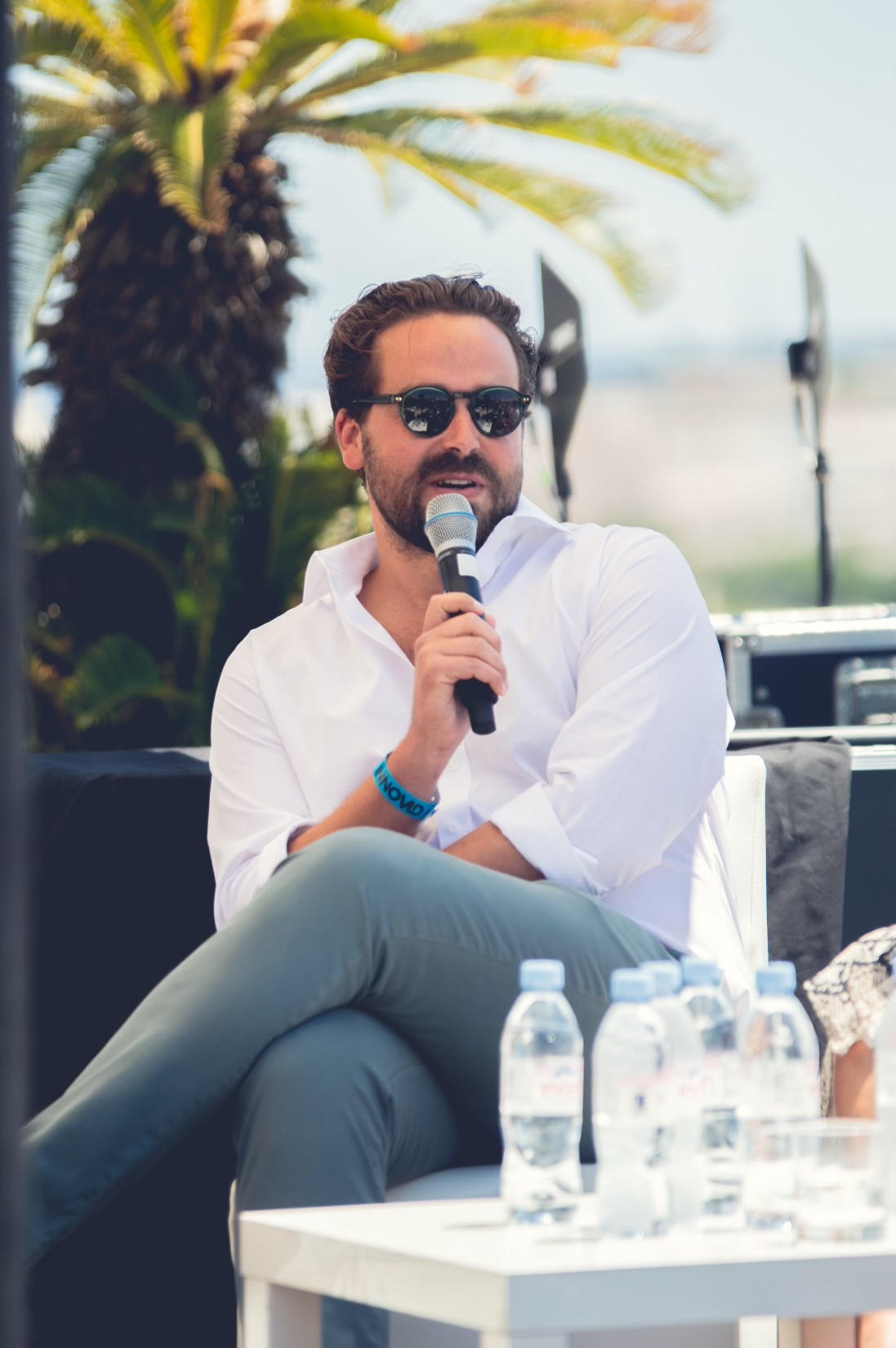
Byers at Cannes Lions in 2019

Dylan Byers is an American journalist. He is a founding partner and senior correspondent at Puck, where he writes a newsletter about media called In The Room. He previously served as the senior media reporter at NBC News, where he authored the Byers Market newsletter and hosted the Byers Market podcast, and at CNN. He has also worked at Politico and Adweek.

== Early life and education ==
Byers was born to Margaret Carol Lewis and Judson Thomas Byers in Seattle, Washington. Both parents served as deputy mayor of Seattle, with a gap between them: Margaret first (1981–89), then Tom nine years later (1998–2002). Margaret was subsequently the director of a network of philanthropists in the Seattle area, and Judson is a founding partner of a public policy consulting firm.

Byers attended Lakeside School in Seattle, from which he graduated in 2004, and Bard College in Annandale-on-Hudson, New York, from which he graduated in 2008.

== Career ==
In 2006, Byers worked as a research assistant at The New Yorker and subsequently served as a personal research assistant to New Yorker writers Philip Gourevitch, George Packer, and Jane Kramer.

He began his journalism career as a media and tech reporter for Adweek. He later moved to Politico and launched the "On Media" blog in November 2011. On Media became known as a "scoop heavy blog" for media and political news. Byers created and grew the blog, and critics praised it as "workaholic media-politics coverage," specific to Byers' niche of the intersection between politics and media.

While at Politico, Byers wrote "President Obama, off the record," an article providing readers a glimpse into an 'off the record' side of US President Barack Obama. For that story, he was a finalist in the 2014 Mirror Awards competition for Best Single Article in Digital Media.

In September 2015, fellow media reporter Brian Stelter announced that Byers was joining CNN. In his announcement, Stelter wrote, "Byers is a scoop machine ... When I've been offline for more than a few hours, the way I see what I've missed is by checking his Twitter feed." At CNN, Byers launched the Pacific newsletter, which focused on the politics, culture and business of Silicon Valley and Hollywood.

Byers joined NBC News and MSNBC in September 2018, and launched the Byers Market newsletter, which focused on the intersection of technology, media and entertainment. He also launched the Byers Market podcast, which featured one-on-one interviews with tech and media executives like Facebook chief operating officer Sheryl Sandberg, IAC chairman Barry Diller and Instagram head Adam Mosseri.

Upon its launch in 2021, Puck announced it had hired Byers from NBC, noting that his "singular expertise on the Venn diagram of the tech-media-entertainment ecosystem has made him a must-subscribe talent for both the mogul class and the concentric circles of aspirants around them." At Puck, Byers has broken news about several executive appointments in media, including the hiring and firing of CNN C.E.O. Chris Licht, the hiring of his successor Mark Thompson, and the appointment of Washington Post C.E.O. and publisher William Lewis, among others.

== Controversy ==
In 2012, Byers drew scrutiny when he reported in Politico that US President Barack Obama's girlfriend in Dreams from My Father was a composite character, which was already acknowledged by Obama in the book. Politico issued an extensive correction at the top of the original article.

In the aftermath of the 2013 Boston Marathon Bombing, Byers amplified, via a tweet, a false conspiracy made by Redditors claiming that the second suspect was Sunil Tripathi, who in fact had died by suicide due to depression prior to the marathon.

Byers was also criticized for "Turbulence at The Times," a critical profile about former New York Times executive editor Jill Abramson, which quoted many anonymous staffers who said she was difficult to work with. Several commentators labeled Byers's piece as sexist. Abramson was let go from The New York Times the following year.

In 2017, Sean Hannity and Juan Williams challenged portions of a Byers CNN report. Byers reported that three sources stated an on-air dispute between the two led to Hannity aiming a gun at Williams off air. Byers reported that it was just Hannity "showing off" but was disturbing to Williams and others present. Fox News investigated and "found that no one was put in any danger". Hannity later said the gun was not loaded and "Never pointed at anybody." Williams said the story was being sensationalized and that he did not feel he had been in harm's way.

On November 21, 2017, Byers posted a tweet on his account implying that the recent sexual harassment scandals in media and entertainment were draining those industries of talent. The tweet was later deleted.

== Personal life ==
Byers is married to Cara Colleen Walsh, a freelance graphic designer who attended New York University and Harvard University.
