= Tal Kopan =

American reporter

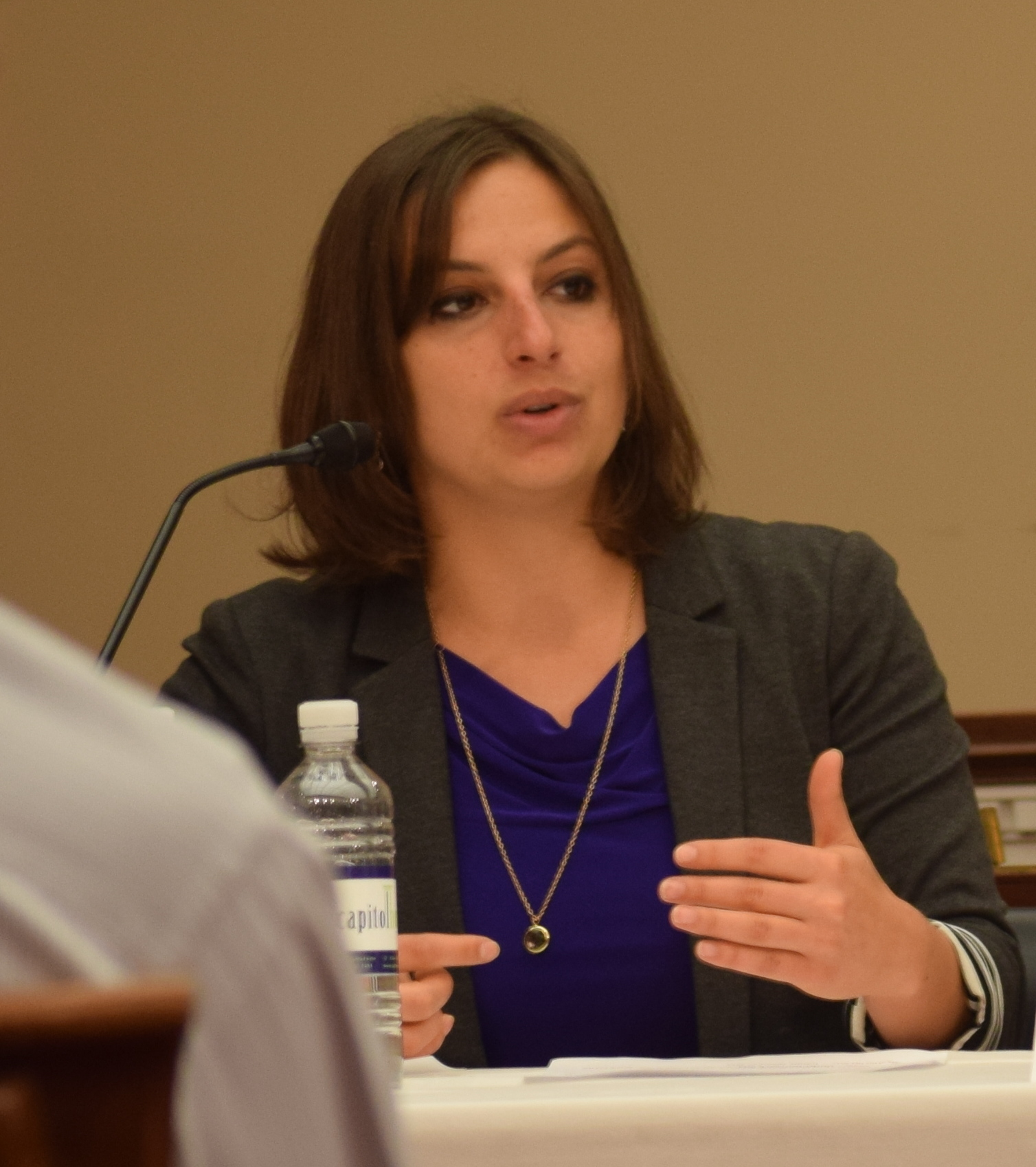
- Tal Kopan in 2014
- Born: Tal Teva Kopan; December 19, 1986 (age 39); Chicago, Illinois
- Education: University of Chicago (AB)
- Occupation: Journalist
- Spouse: Bryan McMahon
- Parent(s): Esther and Raphael Kopan
- Website: www.talkopan.com

Tal Kopan (born December 19, 1986) is deputy Washington bureau chief of The Boston Globe. She joined the newspaper in 2022, after serving four years as the Washington correspondent for the San Francisco Chronicle and previously was an American political reporter for CNN, where she focused on immigration and cybersecurity.

== Biography ==
Tal Teva Kopan was born in 1986 in Chicago, Illinois, the daughter of Esther (née Shidlovsky) and Raphael Kopan. Her father was born in Petah Tikva, Israel and served as an infantry lieutenant in the Israel Defense Forces before emigrating to the United States to obtain a PhD at the University of Chicago (where he worked under Elaine Fuchs); he currently works as a professor of developmental biology at Washington University in St. Louis. Kopan was raised in metropolitan Saint Louis, Missouri where she played percussion with Daniel Wittels and Marvin McNutt and graduated with honors with an A.B. from the University of Chicago. She has one sister, Gili Kopan.

During school, Kopan interned as a web producer at WFLD in Chicago and then as a freelance web producer at ABC 7 Chicago where she covered the trial of former Illinois Governor Rod Blagojevich and the election of Chicago Mayor Rahm Emanuel. She then went to work for Politico in Washington, D.C. as a breaking news reporter and then cybersecurity reporter. She also worked for CNN as a political reporter where she specialized in immigration and cybersecurity. She's currently the Washington correspondent for the San Francisco Chronicle.

Kopan was selected as a 2014-2015 National Press Foundation Paul Miller Fellow, was a member of the 2015 class of Journalist Law School at Loyola Law School, Los Angeles, and was a recipient of the National Academy of Television Arts and Sciences, Midwest Chapter's 2008 Ephraim Family Scholarship.

== Personal life ==
She is married to her high school sweetheart, Bryan McMahon.
