= Jeff Zucker =

American media executive (born 1965)

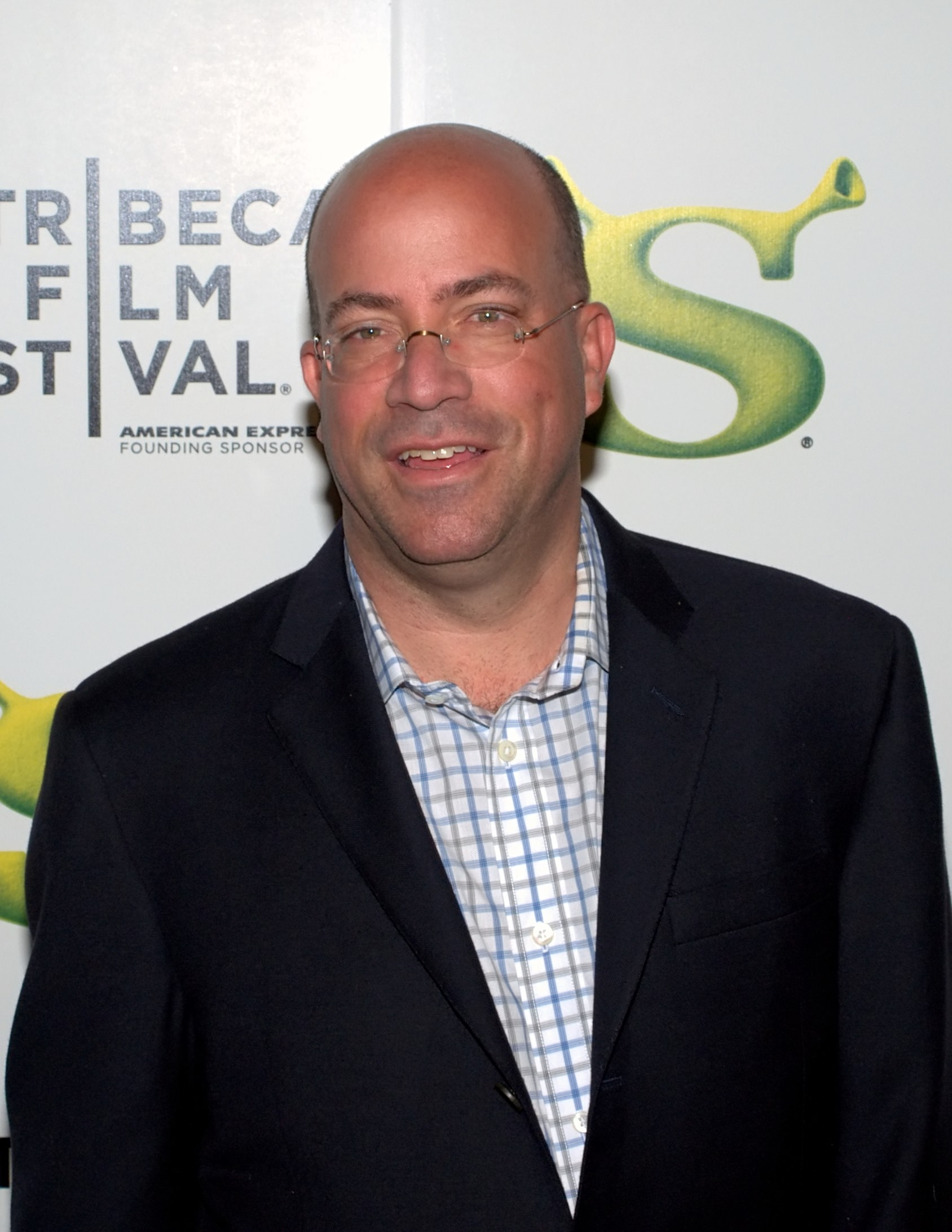
- Zucker in 2010
- Born: Jeffrey Adam Zucker; April 9, 1965 (age 61); Homestead, Florida, U.S.
- Education: Harvard University (BA)
- Occupations: CEO of RedBird IMI; Chairman of Banijay Entertainment
- Years active: 1986–present
- Employer(s): RedBird Capital Partners; Banijay Entertainment
- Spouse: Caryn Nathanson (m. 1996; div. 2017)
- Children: 4

Jeffrey Adam Zucker (born April 9, 1965) is an American businessman and media executive. Zucker was the president of CNN Worldwide from 2013 to 2022. He oversaw CNN, CNN International, HLN, and CNN Digital. He was previously CEO of NBCUniversal.

== Early life and education ==
Jeffrey Adam Zucker was born on April 9, 1965, into a Jewish family in Homestead, Florida, near Miami, on April 9, 1965. His father, Matthew Zucker, was a cardiologist, and his mother, Arline, was a school teacher.

He was a captain of the North Miami Senior High School tennis team, editor of the school paper, and a teenage freelance reporter ("stringer") for The Miami Herald. Zucker also was president of his sophomore, junior, and senior classes, running on the slogan "The little man with the big ideas." He graduated from North Miami Senior High School in 1982. Before college, he took part in Northwestern University's National High School Institute program for journalism. Zucker went on to Harvard University. He was president of the school newspaper, The Harvard Crimson, during his senior year. As such, he encouraged the Crimson's decades-old prank rivalry with the Harvard Lampoon, then headed by future NBC employee Conan O'Brien, which culminated in Zucker having O’Brien arrested. Zucker graduated from Harvard in 1986 with a Bachelor of Arts in American history.

== Career ==
=== NBC and NBCUniversal ===
==== Early career ====
When he was not admitted to Harvard Law School, he began working at NBC by accepting an internship at the 1988 Summer Olympics.

In 1989, he was a field producer for Today, and at 26 he became its executive producer in 1992. He introduced the program's trademark outdoor rock concert series and was in charge as Today moved to the "window on the world" Studio 1A in Rockefeller Plaza in 1994. He is credited with managing the show during its most successful years and launching it into its 16 years of ratings dominance.

==== President (2000–2005) ====
In 2000, he was named NBC Entertainment's president. A 2004 BusinessWeek Profile stated that "During that time he oversaw NBC's entire entertainment schedule. He kept the network ahead of the pack by airing the gross out show Fear Factor, negotiating for the cast of the hit series Friends to take the series up to a tenth season, and signing Donald Trump for the reality show The Apprentice. He is credited with the idea to extend Friends episodes by 10 minutes and convinced the cast to extend their contracts by two years. The Friends era was one of the most profitable ever for NBC. The Zucker era produced a spike in operating earnings for NBC, from $532 million the year he took over to $870 million in 2003."

Zucker introduced Las Vegas, Law & Order: Criminal Intent, and Scrubs. He originated the idea of airing "Supersized" (longer than the standard 30-minute slot) episodes of NBC's comedies and aggressively programming in the summer months as cable networks began to draw away viewers with original programming from the network's rerun-filled summer slate. Bravo changed its programming direction towards reality television, while the newly acquired Spanish network Telemundo was positioned to be more competitive with leading network Univision.

In December 2003, Zucker became president of NBC's Entertainment, News & Cable Group as well.

Following the merger with French media empire Vivendi Universal, he became president of the newly formed NBC Universal Television Group in May 2004. Vivendi Universal had acquired Fox Interactive a year earlier in 2003. During Zucker's tenure, shows that he championed such as Father of the Pride and the Friends spinoff Joey were considered failures.

==== Chief Executive Officer of NBC Universal Television Group ====
On December 15, 2005, Zucker was promoted by NBC Universal to Chief Executive Officer of NBC Universal Television Group behind Robert Charles Wright, vice chairman of General Electric and chairman & CEO of NBC Universal. Zucker was responsible for all programming across the company's television properties, including network, news, cable, sports and Olympics. His responsibilities also included the company's studio operations and global distribution efforts.

==== President and CEO of NBC Universal ====
On February 6, 2007, Zucker became president and CEO of NBC Universal.

In 2010, in response to a public controversy over the network's reported rescheduling of late-night hosts Jay Leno and Conan O'Brien, Los Angeles Times reporters Meg James and Matea Gold wrote that Zucker's tenure had led to "a spectacular fall by the country's premier television network" and dubbed the intra-network feud and subsequent public relations fallout "one of the biggest debacles in television history". Under Zucker NBC fell from being the number one rated network to the lowest rated of the four broadcast networks and was occasionally being beaten in the ratings by programming on some of the more popular cable channels.

Days later, The New York Times columnist Maureen Dowd wrote that in Hollywood "there has been a single topic of discussion: How does Jeff Zucker keep rising and rising while the fortunes of NBC keep falling and falling? ...many in the Hollywood community have always regarded him as ...a network Napoleon who never bothered to learn about developing shows and managing talent." She explained that Zucker "is a master at managing up with bosses and calculating cost-per-hour benefits, but even though he made money on cable shows, he could not program the network to save his life."

Dowd also reported that an unnamed "honcho at another network" stated that "Zucker is a case study in the most destructive media executive ever to exist... You'd have to tell me who else has taken a once-great network and literally destroyed it."

On June 2, 2010, the New York Post reported that Zucker would be paid between $30 million and $40 million to leave NBC Universal shortly after Comcast completed its 51% acquisition in the company.

=== Katie producer ===
After leaving NBC, Zucker produced ABC's daytime talk show Katie, hosted by fellow former employee Katie Couric. He left when he was offered the position of president of CNN Worldwide.

=== Career at WarnerMedia ===
==== President of CNN Worldwide ====
Zucker became president of CNN Worldwide on January 1, 2013. His appointment was widely welcomed by the network and its anchors. Anderson Cooper told colleagues that Zucker was "the first CNN president to actually watch CNN". In December 2013, Zucker stated that his goal for the channel was to offer an "attitude and a take" to viewers, with a larger focus on reality-style documentary series (expanding upon the success of its documentary acquisition Blackfish, and new series Anthony Bourdain: Parts Unknown). Zucker explained that he wanted CNN to appeal more to regular viewers of factual networks (such as A&E, Discovery, and History), and make larger investments into the network's digital properties.

With the 2014 cancellation of Piers Morgan Live, CNN experimented with airing factual programming in primetime as an alternative, with Zucker stating that it would cater to younger demographics than pundit-oriented programs. However, Zucker still insisted that news remained CNN's first priority, and that these programs could be preempted for continuing coverage of breaking news events when needed. 2014 saw an increase in daytime and primetime viewership of CNN; by October 2014, CNN had overtaken MSNBC in primetime key demographic viewership, placing second behind Fox News.

During the 2016 presidential election campaign, a large focus was placed upon on-air debates between partisan pundits surrounding issues relating to the candidates (including, in particular, Republican candidate Donald Trump). In an interview with The New York Times, Zucker stated that aspects of its election coverage were influenced by sports channels (with the Times citing, specifically, debates between pundits reminiscent of shows such as ESPN's First Take, and large outdoor "pre-game" shows for the presidential debates), explaining that "the idea that politics is sport is undeniable, and we understood that and approached it that way." In 2016, CNN reached a monthly average of 105 million unique visitors to its web and mobile properties.

Leaked secret recordings of conversations between Zucker and Trump's lawyer Michael Cohen made in March 2016 show that Zucker wanted to do a weekly show with Trump and offered debate advice to Trump.

On February 2, 2021, Zucker announced he would step down at the end of the year. In August 2021, however, it was reported that he did not plan to leave until the completion of the merger of WarnerMedia and Discovery, Inc.

==== WarnerMedia News & Sports ====
In March 2019, CNN parent WarnerMedia announced a reorganization in which Zucker would become chairman of the company's news and sports division, overseeing Turner Sports, Bleacher Report and AT&T SportsNet, in addition to maintaining his role as head of CNN.

==== Resignation ====
On February 2, 2022, Zucker resigned from CNN. In his resignation letter, Zucker acknowledged that he did not disclose a consensual relationship he had with CNN's Executive Vice President and Chief Marketing Officer, Allison Gollust, when it began. The relationship was made public in early January 2022 during the network's investigation into Chris Cuomo. Following his resignation from CNN, Zucker also resigned from his position as chief of WarnerMedia News & Sports.

=== RedBird IMI ===
In December 2022, Zucker was named an executive with Redbird IMI, a consortium with majority funding from Sheikh Mansour bin Zayed Al Nahyan, Vice President of the UAE. The consortium is a joint venture between Gerry Cardinale's RedBird Capital Partners and International Media Investments, a media investment fund backed by the United Arab Emirates. The position also includes an active role in the XFL, a professional football league partially owned by RedBird.

The consortium's planned purchase of The Telegraph, a prominent British newspaper, has caused controversy in the United Kingdom, as concerns were raised that the newspaper would be coming under the control of an autocratic state.

In April 2024, RedBird confirmed it would withdraw its takeover plans, stating they were "no longer feasible".

== Personal life ==
In 1996, Zucker married Caryn Stephanie Nathanson, then a supervisor for Saturday Night Live, with whom he has four children; the two divorced in 2017.

Diagnosed in 1996 and 1999 with colon cancer, Zucker successfully underwent surgery twice and chemotherapy after the first surgery. In July 2018, Zucker took a six-week leave of absence from CNN to recover from heart surgery.

Zucker was an executive in residence at Columbia Business School.

Business positions
Preceded by Garth Ancier	President of NBC Entertainment; 2000–2004	Succeeded by Kevin Reilly
Preceded by position created	President of NBC Universal Television Group; 2004–2007	Succeeded by position eliminated
Preceded by Bob Wright	CEO of NBC; 2007–2011	Succeeded by Steve Burke
Preceded by Jim Walton	President of CNN Worldwide; 2013–2022	Succeeded by Chris Licht
