= Sarah Palin Channel =

2014–2015 online television news network

History
- Launched: July 27, 2014; 11 years ago
- Closed: July 4, 2015; 10 years ago

The Sarah Palin Channel was an online TV news network devoted to the writings and personality of Sarah Palin that launched on July 27, 2014. In addition to news, Palin stated that she shares "some of the fun that goes on in the Palin household and a lot of our adventures in the great outdoors." Palin constructed the channel as a part of TAPP TV, a media company run by former CNN president Jonathan Klein and former NBCUniversal chairman Jeff Gaspin.

The channel was available only by paid subscription, but the fee was waived for current U.S. service members. Bristol Palin was among the bloggers for the channel.

On July 4, 2015, Sarah Palin announced that she would shut the channel down in its current incarnation. She said the channel would continue to create content and post videos on Facebook and her PAC site starting August 1, 2015.
