= Jovita Moore =

African-American television news anchor

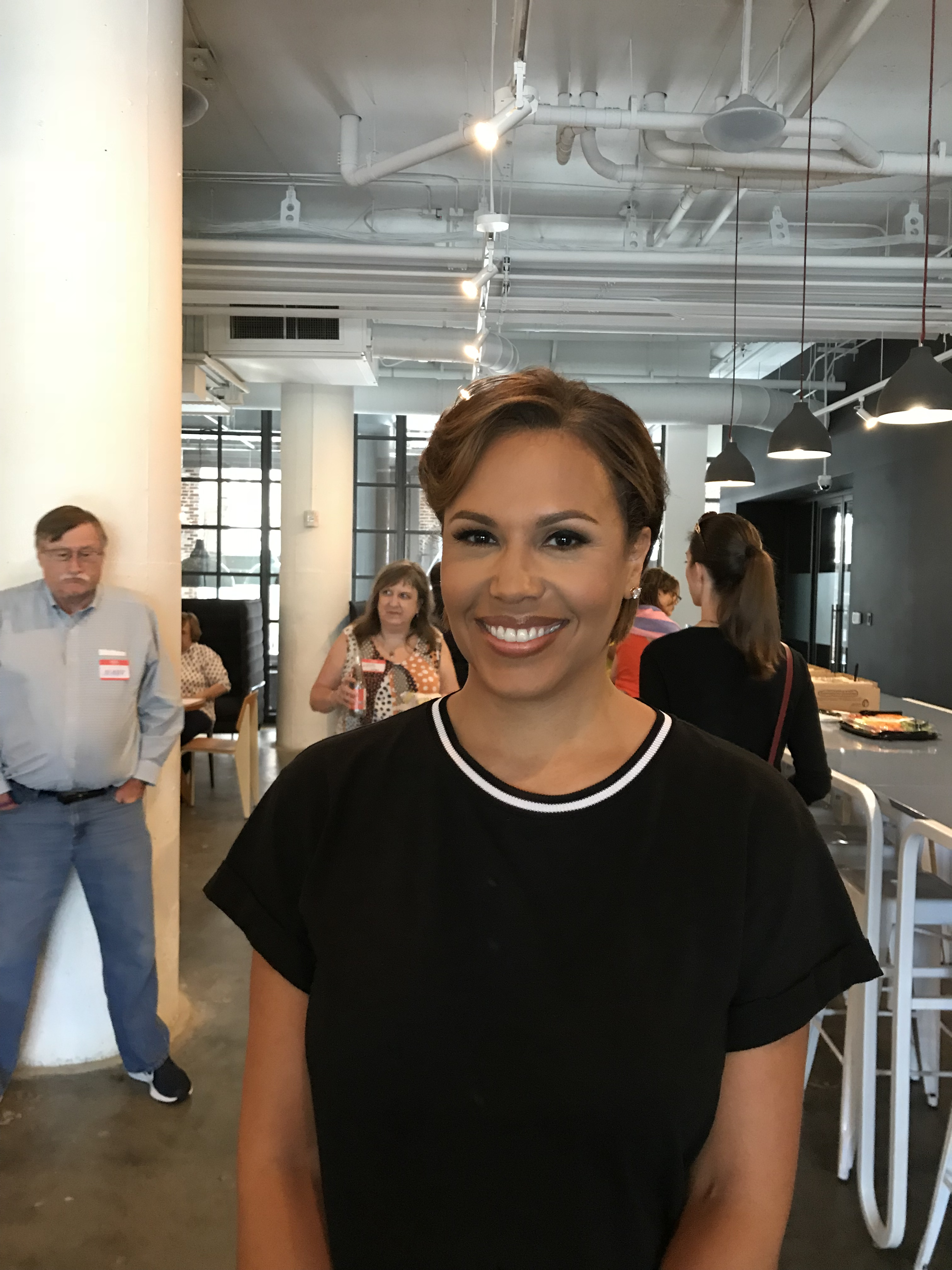
- Moore in 2018
- Born: October 4, 1967; New York City, U.S.
- Died: October 28, 2021 (aged 54); Atlanta, Georgia, U.S.
- Education: Bennington College; Columbia University
- Occupations: Television news anchor and reporter
- Years active: 1990–2021
- Employer(s): New York Times; KFSM-TV (1990–93); WMC-TV (1993–98); WSB-TV (1998–2021)
- Spouse: Sean Griffith (div. 2014)
- Children: 3

Jovita Moore (October 4, 1967 – October 28, 2021) was an American television news anchor who worked for WSB-TV in Atlanta, Georgia, from 1998 until her death.

== Biography ==
Jovita Moore was born in New York City on October 4, 1967. Growing up, she enjoyed watching the news on television with her mother, Yvonne. She earned a Bachelor's degree from Bennington College and interned at The New York Times. Eventually, she got a Masters' degree for broadcast journalism at Columbia University.

=== Career ===
In 1990, Moore began her newscasting career in Fort Smith, Arkansas, for CBS affiliate KFSM-TV. After three years in Fort Smith, she would later move on to Memphis, Tennessee, to work at NBC affiliate WMC-TV. She later moved to Atlanta, Georgia for ABC affiliate WSB-TV in 1998. In 2001, Moore won an Emmy for her news piece on cystic fibroids, which also included her own battle with the disease and surgery. She would go on to win eight more Emmys.

In July 2012, Moore was chosen to replace Monica Kaufman Pearson, who was retiring as anchor of the 5:00, 6:00 and 11:00 evening newscasts, alongside Justin Farmer. In 2017, Moore was awarded the Silver Circle by the Southeastern Chapter of the National Academy of Television Arts & Sciences.

Outside of newscasting, she helped out several civic associations and non-profit organizations throughout metro Atlanta and sat in numerous boards of directors, including the Atlanta Association of Black Journalists and the National Association of Black Journalists.

=== Illness and death ===
In April 2021, doctors diagnosed Moore with two brain tumors. She underwent successful surgery to remove the tumors, but was later diagnosed with glioblastoma, an aggressive form of brain cancer. During her hiatus, Sophia Choi, Linda Stouffer, and Lori Wilson, among others took her place on the newscast. Moore died from the disease on October 28, 2021, at the age of 54.

== Personal life ==
Moore was Catholic.

She was previously married to Sean Griffith, but they divorced in 2014. Together, they had three children: two daughters, Shelby and Lauren, and one son, Joshua.
