= Thomas Roberts (television journalist) =

American television journalist

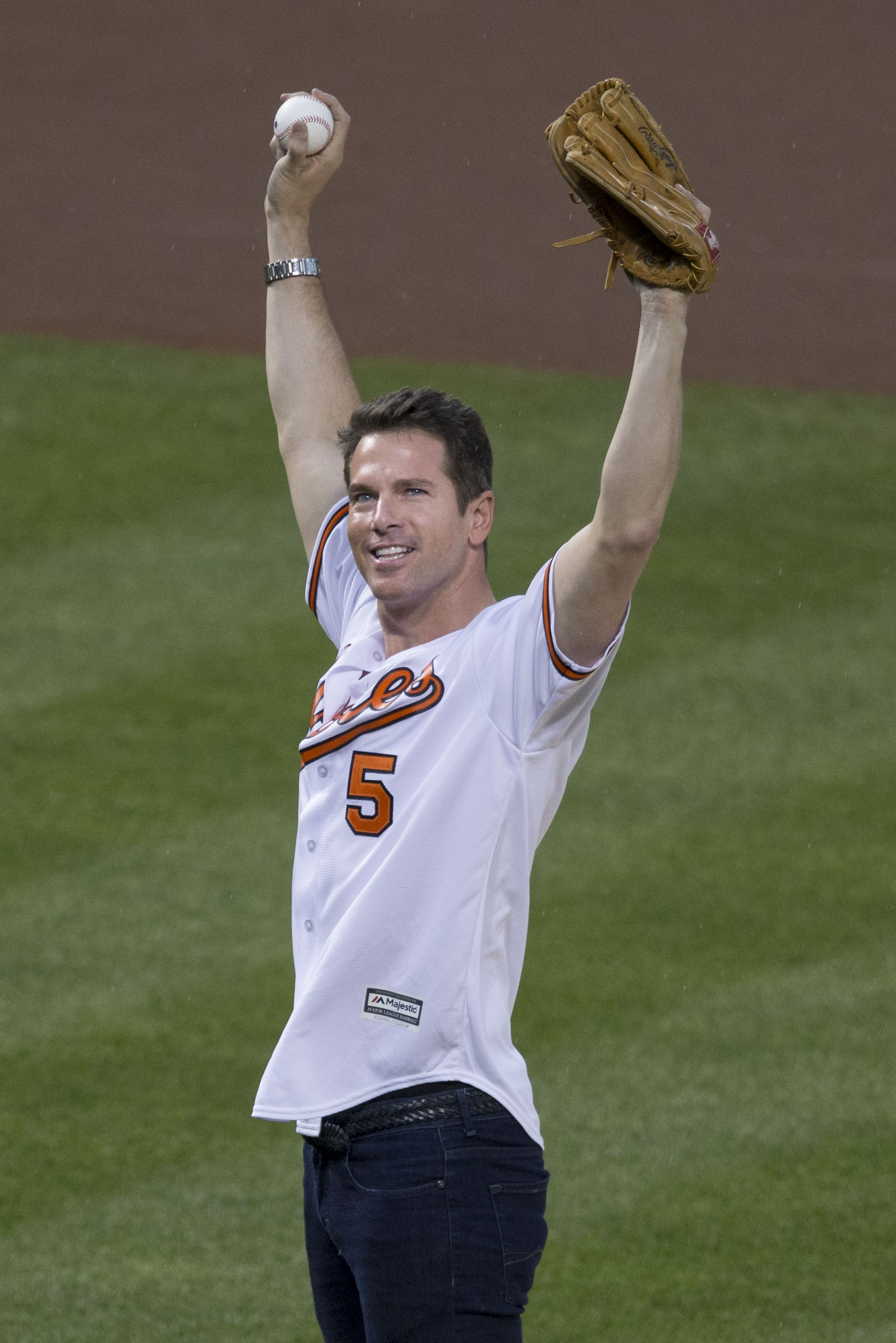
- Roberts in Baltimore at a Baltimore Orioles game (June 15, 2015)
- Born: October 5, 1972 (age 53); Towson, Maryland, U.S.
- Education: Western Maryland College
- Occupation: Journalist
- Employer(s): NBCUniversal, Comcast
- Spouse: Patrick D. Abner (m. 2012) (separated)

Thomas Albert Roberts (born October 5, 1972) is an American television journalist who served as a news anchor for MSNBC, a cable-news channel. He ended his seven-year stint anchoring MSNBC Live, the daytime news platform of NBC News, on weekends from 5-7pm ET. Before that he was anchor of Way Too Early and a contributor to Morning Joe. He was also an NBC News correspondent and a fill-in anchor on Today and NBC Nightly News. On November 18, 2017, it was announced that Roberts had decided to leave MSNBC for other endeavors. On August 14, 2020, it was announced that Roberts will be the host of season four of DailyMailTV.

== Early life and education ==
Roberts grew up in a Roman Catholic family in Towson, Maryland, and attended Catholic schools there, graduating from Calvert Hall College High School. In 1994, Roberts graduated from Western Maryland College (now McDaniel College) with a major in communication and a minor in journalism.

== Career ==
Roberts landed his first job reporting for a small cable station in Westminster, Maryland. He then moved to San Diego and worked as a writer and field producer for NBC affiliate KNSD before relocating to Lincoln, Nebraska, where he worked as a general-assignment reporter with ABC affiliate KLKN-TV.

Roberts went on to become a nightly news anchor and investigative reporter for Fox affiliate WFTX-TV in Fort Myers, Florida, and later for WAVY-TV, an NBC affiliate in Portsmouth, Virginia, which serves the Hampton Roads area. At WAVY-TV, he co-anchored an afternoon newscast and was also the station's investigative and consumer correspondent.

=== CNN and Entertainment journalism ===
Roberts joined CNN, a cable-news channel, in December 2001 and was based in Atlanta, Georgia. He was a weekday anchor on CNN Headline News, co-anchoring alongside Judy Fortin, Sophia Choi, and Kathleen Kennedy. He co-anchored the CNN Headline News coverage of the 2003 Space Shuttle Columbia disaster and the channel's ongoing Iraq War coverage. He received an Emmy Award nomination in 2002 for his investigation into a local puppy mill that was eventually shut down due to his reporting, according to his profile at CNN. He resigned from CNN on May 1, 2007, to pursue "new journalistic opportunities" in the Washington, D.C. area and to be with his partner.

After some time in DC, he moved to Los Angeles to work for the syndicated entertainment programs Entertainment Tonight and The Insider before determining tabloid journalism was not for him and he was dismissed. Roberts then was a correspondent for CBS News in Los Angeles, covering aspects of the trial of Conrad Murray.

=== MSNBC and NBC News ===
In late April 2010, Roberts began freelance anchoring for MSNBC in New York City and was named full-time anchor in December. Roberts primarily anchored Live with Thomas Roberts until its cancelation in 2016. The show is a recipient of an Emmy Award for its coverage of the Supreme Court decision on marriage equality. Roberts also hosted Out There with Thomas Roberts, a weekly news and discussion show focused on LGBT equality issues, for Shift, an MSNBC digital live streaming network, through 2015.

Roberts is seen at the end of the Marvel film The Avengers speaking about the "extraterrestrial invasion" for MSNBC.

Roberts was also a fill-in news anchor on the weekday and weekend versions of Today and a correspondent for NBC News. From December 2010 through February 2011 Roberts anchored the 3 p.m. ET hour of MSNBC until he was moved to the 2 p.m. ET hour. Roberts substituted for Keith Olbermann as the host of MSNBC's Countdown with Keith Olbermann on November 5 and 8, 2010, when Olbermann was suspended from MSNBC for making campaign contributions to candidates in the U.S. 2010 elections. In July 2015, he became the first openly gay evening news anchor on network television when he anchored NBC Nightly News for a day. He later anchored the program on numerous occasions. After having his role minimized, Roberts left MSNBC and NBC in November 2017 and then New York when he was unable to find work at other networks.

=== Post MSNBC Career ===
In June 2018, Roberts became evening anchor on WGCL-46, the CBS affiliate in Atlanta. Roberts resigned from the position on August 16, 2019. Roberts explained his departure by saying, “Sometimes things just aren't the right fit and there is nothing wrong with that. What matters is how it is handled. CBS46 is a class act and I have nothing but gratitude for how they handled my request.” Steve Doerr, WGCL's news director, commented on the resignation stating: “Thomas is a great journalist, and he has made a wide variety of contributions to CBS46 and the Atlanta market. We thank him for his relentless pursuit of the truth and wish him the best of luck in the future.” He added the change "was a mutual, amicable decision.” However, his tenure at the station was mired in controversy after being accused of contributing to a toxic work environment, making disparaging comments and gossiping about coworkers with co-anchor Sharon Reed, who also left the station.

From September 2020 to August 2022, Roberts served as host of The Daily Mail TV.

=== Miss Universe and Miss USA pageant host ===
Roberts co-hosted the 2013 Miss Universe pageant along with Melanie Brown from Moscow. He also co-hosted the Miss USA 2014 with Giuliana Rancic and 2014 Miss Universe pageant with Natalie Morales from Miami, Florida in 2015.

== Personal life ==
=== Survivor of sexual abuse ===
In 2005, after years of silence, Roberts came forward to testify against Jerome F. Toohey Jr., a former priest who had abused Roberts at Calvert Hall College High School. Toohey pleaded guilty to the sexual abuse charges and received a five-year jail sentence with all but eighteen months suspended in February 2006. Toohey served only ten months before his sentence was converted in December with the remaining eight months to be served in home detention. Roberts discussed his abuse in a special segment on CNN's Anderson Cooper 360 called "Sins of the Father" on March 12, 2007.

=== Sexual orientation and coming out ===
Roberts publicly acknowledged he was gay while speaking at the annual convention of the National Lesbian and Gay Journalists Association (NLGJA) in Miami, Florida, held on 8 September 2006. His comments were first reported by Johnny Diaz for the Boston Globe. Along with Craig Stevens, a co-anchor of Miami's WSVN Channel 7, and other local gay anchors, Roberts was a member of a panel called "Off camera: The challenge of LGBT TV anchors." He told the audience that the conference was the "biggest step" he had taken to really be out in public and that he had slowly been coming out at CNN over the past several years.

Diaz reported that Roberts, who has been a member of the NLGJA since 2005, said he was proud of his partner, and that staying in the closet was a difficult thing for a national news anchor. "When you hold something back, that's all everyone wants to know".

Reporter Christie Keith published an interview with Roberts, on 15 September 2006 on the website AfterElton.com, who stated that he actually came out to coworkers in 1999, when he was living in Norfolk, Virginia. "I was happy, I was in a relationship, and I was very proud. I had the support of family, and of my friends. It was ... about not wasting any more time. I'd wasted enough time." He further commented, on the subject of coming out, "Hopefully, everyone, gay or straight, journalists or doctors or otherwise, can overcome that obstacle, because it stands in the way of you being the best you can be, with your job, with your family, with everything, and not have to be afraid anymore."

Roberts also told Keith that he had been approached in 2005 by People magazine, to be one of the publication's 50 "sexiest bachelors", but he declined. "I'm not a bachelor: I thought it would be false advertising ... [and] I didn't think it was the right venue to talk about it."

He has been in a relationship with Patrick Abner since 2000. On 25 June 2011, one day after same-sex marriage in New York was legalized, Roberts announced his engagement to Abner on his Twitter page. The couple was married on 29 September 2012. On October 6, 2023, Patrick Abner filed for divorce.

== See also ==
- LGBTQ culture in New York City
- List of LGBTQ people from New York City
- New Yorkers in journalism
- United States cable news
