= Mike Galanos =

American news anchor for HLN (born 1964)

Mike Galanos (born November 7, 1964) is a former American news anchor for HLN, currently appearing as part of the team on Morning Express with Robin Meade.

Based in CNN's world headquarters in Atlanta, Galanos joined the network in May 2002. He graduated summa cum laude from San Francisco State University. Galanos was the local sports anchor on KTVN-TV in Reno, Nevada from 1991 to 1994 with Ric Renner as the weekend anchor, and was well known for his excellent knowledge of sports in northern Nevada.

== Early life and career ==
Galanos was born November 7, 1964. He is of Greek origin. He started out as a news cameraman, teleprompter operator and video journalist at CNN Headline News for news anchors Don Harrison and Bobbie Battista in the late 1980s. Then he moved to Reno, Nevada and was the on air sports commentator and reporter for KOLO TV.

After leaving Reno, he moved up the ranks to CNN Sports Illustrated as an anchor but later Galanos was at CNN Headline News, as a general assignment news anchor for the network. He formerly co-anchored Prime News with Erica Hill until Hill was named the sole anchor. After Hill was reassigned to CNN's program Anderson Cooper 360 in early 2008, Galanos returned to the program as her replacement.

== Current position ==
Galanos was the host of Prime News on HLN (formerly CNN Headline News). The show is designed to present the featured stories of the day including the insight and input from viewers (hence HLN's slogan: "News and Views"). His critics feel Galanos frequently doesn't follow journalistic independence while presenting the news during the show, as he often expresses his opinion on the topics and people's views.

As of August 16, 2010, Galanos ceased to host "Prime News" (his last air date was August 13, 2010). This was announced via the Prime News Facebook account by Galanos.

He has two sons.
