= Ken Jautz =

American television executive and journalist

- Education: Cornell University (BA)
- Occupation: Former Executive Vice President of CNN-US
- Employer: CNN Worldwide (1989 - 2024)
- Spouse: Kristin Jautz
- Children: 2

Ken Jautz is a television executive who became an EVP for CNN-US, after first joining Turner Broadcasting Europe 36 years before, resigning in 2024. Prior, he worked in various media roles, beginning as a foreign correspondent in Europe for Associated Press in 1989.

Jautz has managed several networks, including HLN, CNNfn and n-tv, a German national news channel, and has created several highly rated programs. He also managed the CNNfn network, and served as managing director of n-tv, the first 24-hour national news channel in Germany.

== Education ==
Jautz graduated from Cornell University and the Columbia University Graduate School of Journalism.

== Career ==
Jautz was a local newspaper reporter and a foreign correspondent for The Associated Press (AP) before becoming its overseas bureau chief for CNN in Germany in 1989.

Among the stories he covered for AP were the fall of the Berlin Wall and subsequent revolutions in Eastern European countries, including the 1991 Gulf War; the dissolution of the Soviet Union; and the break-up of Yugoslavia and resulting Balkan conflicts.

From 1995 to 2000, Jautz worked for Turner Broadcasting Europe, managing several European networks, starting as a London-based business development executive helping launch news channels and programs in several European countries, then as the Berlin, Germany-based managing director of n-tv, which operated the first all-news television network in Germany. Jautz served as executive vice president of CNN's business news unit from 2001 to 2004, during which time he managed the CNNfn network, helped launch the CNNMoney website, and oversaw all business programming on CNN/U.S., including several award-winning weekday and weekend business programs.

In September 2010, he was named president of CNN/U.S. programming by CNN Worldwide president Jim Walton, succeeding Jonathan Klein, with Scot Safon was named as his replacement. He was responsible for CNN programming from 2010 to 2013. During his tenure, the network commissioned its first non-fiction series from outside producers and received critical acclaim for its commitment to international reporting, including a Peabody award and Emmy award for coverage of the Arab Spring in 2011.

From 2005 to 2010, Jautz was responsible for HLN where he revamped and re-branded the network formerly known as CNN Headline News and created a host of new shows that cumulatively posted record ratings for the network, including Morning Express with Robin Meade, Nancy Grace, Showbiz Tonight and Joy Behar. He oversaw CNN/U.S. programming for three years.

In 2022, he led CNN, along with Amy Entelis and Michael Bass, for the interim between CEOs Jeff Zucker and Chris Licht.

Jautz resigned from CNN at the end of 2024, after 36 years.

== Personal life ==
He is married to his wife Kristin, a German national, whom he met while he was in Germany. They have two children. Jautz is fluent in German. They split their lives between New York City and Rye, Connecticut.
