= Scot Safon =

American media executive

- Education: B.A.University of Virginia; M.B.A. Cornell University
- Occupation: Media executive
- Known for: President of HLN

Scot Safon is an American media executive who formerly served as President of HLN and Executive Vice President and Chief Marketing Officer of CNN. In March 2018, Safon was named Chief Marketing Officer of UPtv.

== Early life and education ==
Safon was born to a Jewish family and earned a B.A. in economics and history from the University of Virginia and a M.B.A. from Cornell University.

== Career ==
=== Early career ===
After school he worked for the advertising agency D'Arcy Masius Benton & Bowles, Inc. as an account manager where he worked on the campaigns for CBS Sports, CBS News, and CBS International. In 1991, Safon joined Turner Network Television (TNT) as Director of Advertising where he was in charge of all network branding, consumer advertising, trade advertising, and the promotion of all series and franchises. In June 2001, he spearheaded the network's We Know Drama branding initiative.

=== CNN ===
In August 2002, Safon was hired by CNN Worldwide as its senior vice president of marketing and promotion. In 2007, he was promoted to executive vice president, chief marketing officer with responsibility for the marketing and promotion of all CNN brands, including CNN/U.S., HLN, CNN International, CNN.com, and CNN Mobile. In this position he oversaw the promotion of numerous CNN shows including Anderson Cooper 360, Nancy Grace, Joy Behar, Larry King Live, The Situation Room, and Fareed Zakaria GPS. He has also overseen the Emmy-winning campaign for the God's Warriors; campaigns for award-winning primetime documentary series Black in America and Planet in Peril; the Power of CNN Under Your Command campaign; the Where Information Meets Opportunity CNN Mobile campaign; and CNN International's Go Beyond Borders campaign. In 2006, Safon was named a 2006 “Brand Builder” by Television Week magazine. In September 2010, Safon was named by Jim Walton as president of HLN replacing Ken Jautz who was named president of CNN/U.S. In September 2013, he was replaced by Albie Hecht.

=== The Weather Channel ===
Safon was named Executive VP and chief marketing officer of The Weather Channel in 2013. He reported directly to the company's president at the time, David Clark, who said that Safon "has an almost legendary track record of building brands that people rely on and trust, making him an ideal fit as we grow [the] network." During a large restructuring of the company in 2014, Safon was let go from his role.

=== UPtv ===
In 2018, Safon joined UPtv as Chief Marketing Officer. His team manages all brand communications for UP and plans to launch a lineup of original unscripted series.

== Personal life ==
Safon lives in Atlanta, Georgia.
