= NBC Columbia =

NBC Columbia can refer to:

- KOMU-TV, the NBC television affiliate in Columbia, Missouri.
- WIS (TV), the NBC television affiliate in Columbia, South Carolina.
