= TAPP TV =

Defunct subscription-based content network

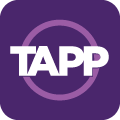
TAPP TV logo

TAPP TV ("TAPP" stands for TV APP) was a subscription-based online video content network, home to individual "channels" built around public personalities with large followings. It was founded in 2013 by Jeff Gaspin, former chairman of NBC Universal Television, and Jonathan Klein, former president of CNN US. Michael Greer, former CTO of the Onion, was a co-founder and CTO.

TAPP TV subscribers paid $9.95 per month or $99.95 per year to receive daily video content from subscribed video channels. Each channel was sold separately.

TAPP TV's investors included Discovery Communications and Demarest Films, and individual investors including Eric Schmidt, Executive Chairman of Google, and investment bankers Ken Moelis, Peter Ezersky and Michael Huber. In addition to Gaspin and Klein, the TAPP TV board included Sean Atkins, senior vice president and general manager, Digital, at Discovery Communications.

The last post on TAPP's account on the social media platform X is dated 2017. As of July 2024, its official website is no longer operating.

== TAPP channels ==
In March 2014, Gaspin and Klein announced plans to launch a roster of channels on the TAPP platform in 2014.

TAPP launched its first channel on March 20: New Life TV, featuring Steve Arterburn, an American syndicated radio host with 2 million weekly listeners to his New Life Live program. Arterburn is a Christian counselor, author and motivational speaker, focused on relationships, family and addiction. He is the founder of New Life Ministries and Women of Faith.

In March 2014, reports circulated that Sarah Palin would be launching a TAPP channel. The Palin channel was shuttered in 2015.

== Online subscription video industry ==
TAPP's founders had cited Glenn Beck's Blaze TV, which launched in 2012, as one inspiration for their business model. Reports put The Blaze's subscriber base at 300,000 people paying $9.95 per month. In December 2013, Chernin Entertainment announced it had taken a majority stake in Crunchyroll, which aggregates online anime videos offered on both a subscription and pay-per-view basis. In February 2014, WWE launched its own subscription video channel, and has announced more than 600,000 monthly subscribers since launch.

== See also ==
- The Sarah Palin Channel
