= Jon Klein (media executive) =

American media executive

- Born: Jonathan Klein
- Education: Brown University
- Occupations: Entrepreneur, Media Executive
- Known for: TAPP, CNN, CBS, Wp Spinger Investment
- Title: CEO of Tapp
- Website: tapptv.com

Jonathan Klein is an American media and technology executive and entrepreneur. He is the co-founder and CEO of HANG, a fan engagement platform that connects GenZ audiences with brands who have included Wells Fargo, McDonald's, Toyota, State Farm, and MolsonCoors. Klein previously served as president of Vilynx, an AI platform that was acquired by Apple in 2020. He is the former president of CNN/US and former executive vice president of CBS News, where he oversaw 60 Minutes and 48 Hours. He is a media thought leader with frequent appearances in the op-ed pages of The New York Times and The Washington Post, as well as network appearances on Bloomberg, CNN, CNBC, Fox News, MSNBC, and NPR.

As a producer and executive, Jon has won numerous Emmy Awards, Peabody Awards, and DuPont Columbia Awards.

== Career ==
Born in the Bronx and raised there and in New Rochelle, New York, Klein graduated magna cum laude from Brown University in 1980 with a degree in history. He was news director and then general manager of WBRU, a student-run 50,000-watt commercial radio station.

Klein began his television career in 1980 as a news producer at WLNE in Providence, R.I., and the following year moved to a similar position at WPIX in New York on the Independent Network News program. In 1982, he joined CBS News as a writer and news editor on the overnight broadcast Nightwatch. He served as broadcast producer on CBS Morning News and then CBS Evening News Weekend Edition, where he won an Emmy Award for live coverage of the 1986 Reagan/Gorbachev summit in Reykjavik, Iceland.

In 1988, Klein joined the fledgling prime-time magazine series 48 Hours as a field producer, eventually winning an Emmy Award for coverage of Hurricane Hugo and a Peabody Award for an hour he produced on the anti-abortion movement. Klein served as senior producer for CBS's 1990 late-night series America Tonight with Charles Kuralt and Lesley Stahl, as senior producer for the network's coverage of the 1991 Gulf War and later for the documentary Back to Baghdad, in which foreign correspondent Bob Simon returned to the Middle East following his imprisonment by the Iraqis during the war. As executive vice president of CBS News, Jon oversaw "60 Minutes," restoring the program to ratings and profitability growth through improved relevance.

In 1993, Klein launched the documentary series Before Your Eyes, two-hour movies-of-the-week that explored social issues such as child abuse, AIDS and juvenile delinquency. In 1997, Klein conceived, and executive produced the CBS documentary Inside the Jury Room, in which network television cameras were permitted for the first time to observe deliberations in a criminal trial. The documentary won a Columbia-DuPont Silver Baton.

In 1998, Jon left CNN to found The FeedRoom, an online video aggregator that created such industry standards as pre-rolled video ads and the first-ever over-the-top streaming product (CBS March Madness on-demand), cited by media analysts as the launch of the OTT industry.

In 2004, he was recruited to become the president of CNN/US, a position in which he served until September 2010.

With former NBCU Television Chairman Jeff Gaspin, in 2013 he co-founded TAPP Media, a subscription streaming platform for personalities with super-fan followings - including Sarah Palin and Bishop TD Jakes. The startup, which became profitable, was backed by Discovery Communications.

From 2018-2019, Klein served as president of Vilnyx, an artificial intelligence platform for media companies that was acquired by Apple.

He then co-founded HANG Media in 2020, alongside Lorne Greene, CEO of Viva Creative, a live and virtual experiential events company. HANG has won three Cynopsis Sports Media Awards, for Best Production Innovation, Best Brand Activation, and Best Fan Engagement Tool.

Klein also wrote the story for the TNT Original film Buffalo Soldiers, a 1997 historical drama starring Danny Glover. c

Jon served as senior media consultant to the HBO series "Succession." He sits on the board of directors of Belden, Inc. (NYSE: BDC) and volunteers on the board of directors of WBRU.

=== CNN ===
Employed by CNN/US as president in November 2004, one of Klein's first acts was to deploy a large contingent of American-based correspondents to cover the Asian tsunami. Previously, CNN would usually send locally based overseas correspondents to cover breaking international stories. This tactic of "flooding the zone," as Klein called it, became a hallmark of CNN's breaking news coverage on other major stories as well. CNN won the DuPont-Columbia Award for its tsunami coverage, and the George Foster Peabody Award for its coverage of Katrina.

In early 2005, Klein canceled the long-running program Crossfire and replaced it with The Situation Room, saying that he agreed with Jon Stewart's criticism that the talk show was incendiary and detracting from reasoned political discussion.The Situation Room would go on to win an Emmy Award won the 5pm time period among adults 25-54

In late 2005, Klein named Anderson Cooper, who had become renowned for his coverage of Hurricane Katrina, as anchor of CNN's 10pm hour, and released Aaron Brown, who had anchored NewsNight in that hour since 2001. The stated goal was to make CNN more competitive in prime time through aggressive reporting. In 2008, Cooper's program, AC 360, became the #1 rated cable news show among adults 25-54, a first for the network in that time period.

Klein attempted to hire Keith Olbermann away from MSNBC in 2006 to replace the struggling Paula Zahn at 8:00 pm. The idea was rejected by Jim Walton, president of CNN Worldwide, and Phil Kent, chief executive officer of Turner Broadcasting, of which CNN is a part. Instead, Campbell Brown was hired away from NBC News as CNN's 8 pm anchor. Her program never caught on in the ratings, and she left the network in the spring of 2010. In November 2009, Lou Dobbs announced that he had decided to leave the network to pursue advocacy journalism more freely. Klein replaced him with John King as the 7pm anchor, and named Candy Crowley, a longtime political reporter, to replace King as host of the Sunday morning talk show, "State of the Union."

In 2008, Klein hired Fareed Zakaria, then editor of Newsweek International, to host Fareed Zakaria GPS, a weekly Sunday talk show focused on global affairs. Zakaria recently left Newsweek to join Time magazine, a corporate cousin of CNN's under the Time Warner umbrella.

Faced with declining ratings in prime time in the year following the Obama inauguration, Klein hired Eliot Spitzer, the former governor of New York, and Kathleen Parker, a Pulitzer Prize-winning columnist for the Washington Post, to anchor a new 8 pm program; Parker Spitzer debuted in October 2010, shortly after Klein left the network in September and Ken Jautz, former head of CNN's HLN, became the president of CNN/US. Klein also recruited and hired Piers Morgan to replace Larry King as host of the network's 9 pm interview show.

Klein's innovations while at CNN include the first-ever YouTube presidential debate, the first-ever Facebook inauguration livestream (Barack Obama's 2009 inauguration), John King's touch screen wall, and the integration of Twitter as a newsgathering tool before any other mainstream network.
