= HLN (TV channel) =

American basic cable television channel

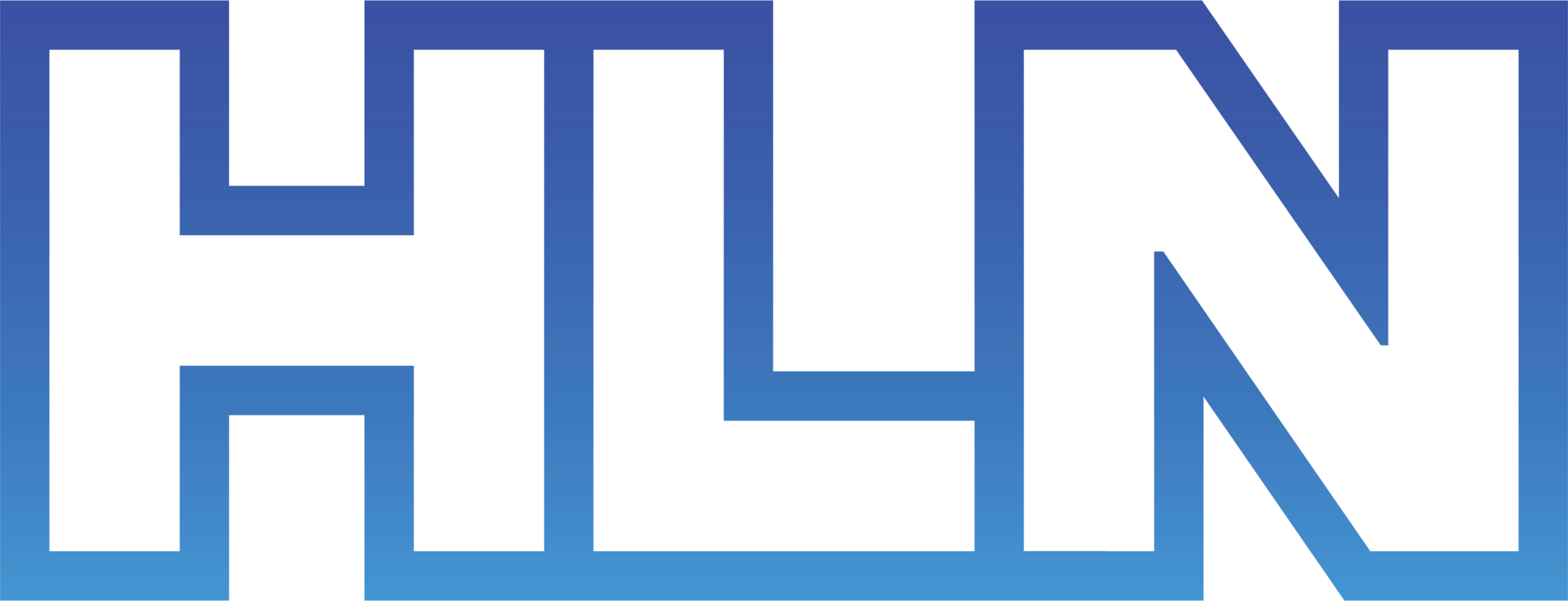
- Country: United States
- Broadcast area: United States; Canada; Latin America; The Caribbean; Asia; MENA; Australia (some hotels only)
- Headquarters: Midtown Atlanta, Atlanta, Georgia

Programming
- Language: English
- Picture format: 1080i HDTV (downscaled to letterboxed 480i for the SDTV feed)

Ownership
- Owner: Skydance
- Parent: CNN Worldwide
- Sister channels: CNN; CNN International; CNN en Español; Investigation Discovery

History
- Launched: January 1, 1982; 44 years ago (as CNN2); August 9, 1982; 44 years ago (as Headline News); December 15, 2008; 17 years ago (as HLN)
- Former names: CNN2; (1982); Headline News; (1982–1997); CNN Headline News; (1997–2007); HLN: Headline News; (2007–2008)

Links
- Website: www.cnn.com/specials/videos/hln

Availability

Terrestrial
- Audio available via some radio stations: Frequencies vary

Streaming media
- go.cnn.com: Live simulcast (Pay-TV subscribers only) HBO Max/Discovery+
- YouTube TV, Hulu with Live TV, Sling TV, DirecTV Stream, Xfinity Stream

HLN is an American basic cable television channel owned by CNN Worldwide, a division of Skydance. The channel primarily carries true-crime programming, recently drifting away from limited live news programming.

The channel was originally launched on January 1, 1982, by Turner Broadcasting as CNN2 (later renamed Headline News or CNN Headline News), a sister network to CNN that broadcast a looping, half-hour cycle of segments covering various news topics. In 2005, HLN began to diverge from this format and air more personality-based programs, including a primetime block featuring pundits such as Glenn Beck and legal commentator Nancy Grace. In the mid-2010s, HLN repositioned itself as a social media-centric network, highlighting headlines popular on social networks, and introducing social media-themed shows. Under CNN president Jeff Zucker, the channel began to backpedal on this programming in 2016, gradually shifting to a focus on crime, "regional" headlines, and entertainment stories (in contrast to CNN's current focus on politics) during its daytime programming, with true crime programs airing at all other times.

With the 2022 merger of CNN parent WarnerMedia and Discovery Inc. to form Warner Bros. Discovery, HLN became a sister to Discovery's true-crime channel Investigation Discovery (ID). In December 2022, then-new CNN president Chris Licht announced that HLN would abandon original live news programming entirely as part of a reorganization, with the network now being overseen by ID's staff. For contractual reasons, HLN continues to air news content daily through a simulcast of CNN's early morning programming. The network's schedule outside of that has primarily featured true crime programs as before, in addition to occasional marathons of crime and legal dramas from the Warner Bros. Television library.

As of November 2023, HLN is available to approximately 68,000,000 pay television households in the United States-down from its 2011 peak of 100,000,000 households. Since the mid-2000s, HLN has been available internationally on pay television providers in parts of Asia, the Caribbean, Latin America, the Middle East, North Africa, and Canada.

== History ==
=== Launch and early years ===
The channel was launched at midnight Eastern Time on January 1, 1982, as CNN2. The channel's launch was simulcast nationwide on sister networks CNN and Superstation WTBS (now simply TBS), starting at 11:45 p.m. on December 31, 1981, as a preview for cable providers that had not yet reached agreements to carry CNN2. Following a preview reel by original CNN anchor Lou Waters and an introduction by founder and then-Turner Broadcasting CEO Ted Turner, Chuck Roberts (who would become the channel's longest-serving news anchor, with a 28-year career with CNN2/Headline News that lasted until his retirement on July 30, 2010) and Denise LeClair anchored the channel's first newscast.

Originally, the channel's programming was formatted around the idea that a viewer could tune in at any time of day or night (instead of having to wait for the once- or twice-daily national news segments in local newscasts, or morning or evening network news programs), and receive up-to-date information on the top national and international stories in just 30 minutes. This "Headline News Wheel" format—which was derived from the "wheel" segment schedules used by all-news radio stations and repeated each half-hour—featured national and world news at the top of the hour (:00/:30), business and personal finance reports ("Dollars and Sense") at :15/:45 after the hour; sports scores and headlines ("Headline Sports") at :20/50 after; and lifestyle reports at :25/:55 after. The :25/:55 lifestyle segment was designed to allow local cable systems the option of pre-empting it with a local headline "capsule" from an associated regional cable news channel or a local television station. Another regular feature, the "Hollywood Minute", was often fitted-in after the "Headline Sports" segment. In the channel's early years, a two-minute recap of the hour's top stories, the "CNN Headlines," would run after the sports segment.

On August 9, 1982, what had been called "CNN2" for its first eight months on the air was renamed Headline News, though the network would be referred to on-air as "CNN Headline News" for much of the mid-1980s. (Beginning around 1988, some newspapers began referring to the channel as "HLN Headline News.") By 1992, the channel was often abbreviated as "HN" (the channel would later incorporate a die-cut "HN" block design within the original variant of its third logo when it was introduced in 1989, before it was fully supplanted by the wordmark that accompanied it in 1992, which was later italicized). During its first year, Headline News had a competitor in the form of ABC/Group W's Satellite News Channel, which operated from June 21, 1982, to October 27, 1983. After its shutdown, SNC's satellite slot was then purchased by Ted Turner to expand Headline News' reach further into additional homes. Shortly after, sister station WTBS handed over production duties for their NewsWatch news capsules to Headline News (resulting in these interstitials switching from an in-studio anchor format to being presented in voiceover only), and at various times, other specialized news capsules produced by Headline News aired as well; the NewsWatch segments as well as daily Headline News simulcasts were phased out on TBS's local and national feeds in 1996 after the Federal Communications Commission (FCC) relaxed regulatory requirements on public affairs programming.

Jon Petrovich was hired in the mid-1980s by Turner to lead Headline News. In 1990, Headline News developed Local Edition, a six-minute-long local newscast, whose content was produced by a local broadcast station in the participating market, airing at the end of each half-hour of Headline News' rolling news block. The channel included the "CNN" branding in its name intermittently for most of its history, before being incorporated on a regular basis from 1997 to 2007 (though an alternate logo without the CNN logo was used for news broadcasts through 2001).

In 1989, Headline News introduced a ticker that appeared at the lower one-third of the screen – except during commercial breaks, which initially showed specific financial data with indexes of the major international markets (including the Dow Jones Industrial Average, NASDAQ and the S&P 500) and quotes for major companies during trading hours, which were updated on a 15-minute delay. In 1992, the channel added the "Headline News SportsTicker", which showed sports scores and schedules for the day's upcoming games, creating the first continuous news ticker on television. The redesign resulted in video of the rolling newscasts becoming pillarboxed with blue bars on the left and right wings of the screen (matching the ticker's original coloring), before it returned to a full-screen format, with the ticker becoming a translucent black background overlaid on the lower third of the video, as part of a 1994 update to the channel's graphics package that also added weather forecasts for select major U.S. cities to the ticker. At the same time, the network's bug was integrated into the ticker, and thus, the logo was no longer used in the copyright at the end of each broadcast.

Like CNN, the parent company Turner Broadcasting System was acquired by Time Warner in 1996.

=== George H. W. Bush death hoax ===
On January 8, 1992, Headline News almost became the victim of a hoax. When President George H. W. Bush fainted at a state dinner in Tokyo, Japan, a person claiming to be the president's physician called into the channel's Atlanta headquarters and claimed that Bush had died. At 9:45 a.m., anchor Don Harrison prepared to break the story, stating "This just in to CNN Headline News, and we say right off the bat, we have not confirmed this through any other sources..." Executive producer Roger Bahre, who was off-camera, immediately yelled "No! Stop!" After glancing away momentarily, Harrison continued, "We are now getting a correction. We will not give you that story. It was regarding some rather tragic news involving President Bush, but updating that story, President Bush is reported to be resting comfortably." It turned out that an Idaho man, James Edward Smith, called CNN posing as the president's physician. A CNN employee entered the information into a centralized computer used by both CNN and Headline News, and it nearly got out on the air before it could be verified. Smith was subsequently questioned by the Secret Service and hospitalized at a private medical facility for evaluation.

=== Jukebox effect ===
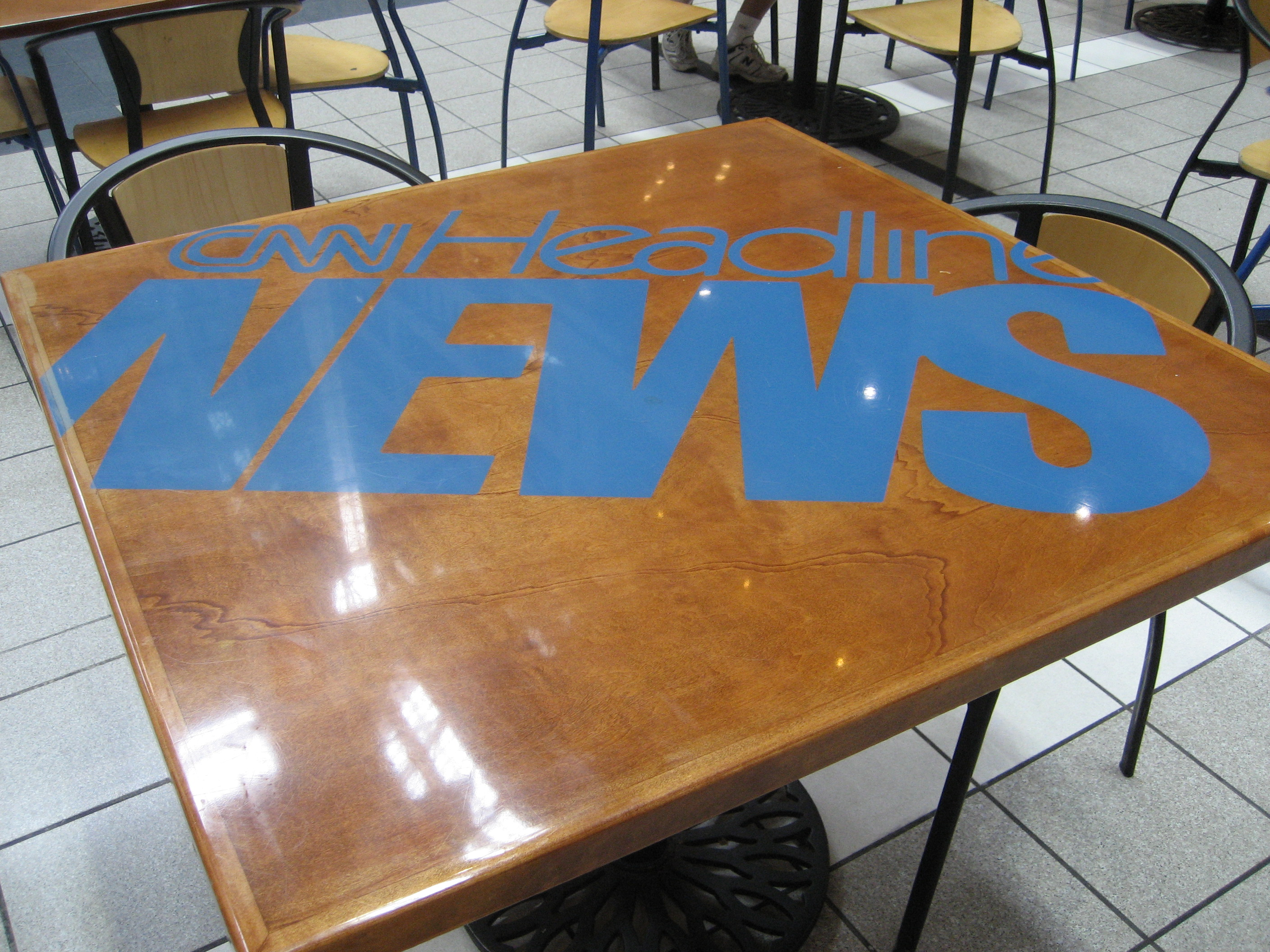
1997–2001 CNN Headline News logo on a table in the food court at CNN Center. Tables like these have since been removed.

In 1992, Headline News pioneered the use of a digital video "jukebox" to recycle segments of one newscast seamlessly into another. The new technology reduced the number of staffers needed by enabling news segments to be re-used throughout an entire day (previously, anchors read the same stories repeatedly, hour after hour, with the second 15 minutes of each half-hour in the "wheel" being broadcast on videotape every third and fourth hour). This resulted in the layoffs of part of its staff, including such stalwart anchors as Lyn Vaughn, David Goodnow and Bob Losure, all of whom had been with Headline News for over 10 years.

=== 1999 reformatting ===
On June 15, 1999, the network underwent a complete visual revamp, including an updated ticker (now dubbed the "Superticker"), a brand-new newsroom and studio, and a sectioning of the channel's schedule into four distinct dayparts, to convey the idea that, unlike CNN, which aired long-form programming such as discussion shows and documentaries, Headline News never stopped offering straight news coverage. The daypart blocks each ran for six hours and utilized their own special branding and color-coding (which extended to the graphics and segment introductions): First Watch (from 6:00 a.m.-12 midday Eastern Time, colored yellow), Second Watch (12 midday - 6:00 p.m. ET, colored red), Third Watch (6:00 p.m.-12 midnight ET, colored green), and Late Watch (12 midnight - 6:00 a.m. ET, colored blue). Additional segments were also added prior to commercial breaks: Best Bets On..., which provided top picks in categories such as films (with information supplied by publications owned by then-sister company Time Inc.), and Week-At-A-Glance, which provided summaries of important events occurring that week. To promote the change, two new slogans were introduced: Get To The Point News and 24 Hour Nonstop Headlines (the latter frequently used in ident bumpers).

=== 2001 re-launch ===
On August 6, 2001, CNN Headline News unveiled a revamp of the network's on-air format, promoted with a new slogan, Real news, real fast. The centerpiece of the new format was the replacement of the network's ticker with a large pane across the bottom of the screen, which displayed headlines and other information (such as weather updates and sports news). The network also introduced another new studio and multi-anchor format, and announced plans to add more live rolling news coverage. CNN described the new design as being inspired by the internet, in an attempt to appeal to younger viewers; the Chicago Tribune noted that the channel's viewership had been dropping, and skewing towards viewers over 50, which are not desirable to most advertisers.

Upon its launch, the new format received mixed reviews, with critics arguing that the new screen format conveyed too much information at once, distracting viewers from its main video programming. Critics also drew comparisons to financial news channels, as well as a similar increase in on-screen information announced by sports news service ESPNews. Steve Johnson of the Chicago Tribune explained that "the video portion of Headline News' subdivided screen occupies only about a third of the total real estate. My 27-inch set shrinks, in effect, to a 14-incher when tuned to Headline News. Never mind the old-school problem of trying to spot the hockey puck; people with smaller sets watching sports highlights here will have trouble finding a basketball."

On February 3, 2003 Headline News moved to a fully live format from 6AM-Midnight weekdays. This line-up would continue until Headline News began to move away from the newswheel in 2005.

- 6AM-9AM Robin Meade
- 9AM-Noon Judy Fortin & Thomas Roberts
- Noon-3PM Kathleen Kennedy & Renay San Miguel
- 3PM-6PM Linda Stouffer & Chuck Roberts
- 6PM-9PM Sophia Choi & Stephan Frazier
- 9PM-11PM Headline News Tonight with Rudi Bakhtiar & Mike Galanos
- Midnight-6AM Headline News 24/7 with Bakhtiar & Gallanos, repeating every hour

=== 2005–2013: Headline Prime, "News and Views" ===
Previous HLN logo. Used sparingly as on-screen bug until January 13, 2015.

In February 2005, the network launched a new primetime block known as Headline Prime; the block was designed to feature opinion-driven and personality-based programs (in contrast to the "hard news" programming of CNN), which network executive Ken Jautz described as a shift to "news to views". Its launch lineup featured Prime News Tonight, the entertainment news program Showbiz Tonight with A. J. Hammer, and an eponymous current affairs program hosted by legal commentator Nancy Grace, which featured news and analysis related to crime and court cases. Noam Cohen of The New York Times described the new lineup as being reminiscent of Fox News Channel.

In May 2006, Headline Prime added an eponymous program hosted by conservative talk radio host Glenn Beck. Both Nancy Grace and Glenn Beck brought major ratings gains to Headline News, especially within the key demographics, although its daytime programming only saw modest increases. Exposed: The Extremist Agenda, a Glenn Beck special aired in November 2006, broke a million viewers and was the network's most-watched program of the year. That year, Headline News also launched a morning show hosted by Robin Meade, Robin & Company—which was later re-branded as Morning Express in 2007.

On December 15, 2008, alongside an associated revamp of CNN's on-air presentation, Headline News underwent a rebranding with a new speech bubble-themed logo, and officially adopted the initialism "HLN" as its on-air name. "News and Views" was also adopted as the network's new slogan. In September 2010, Scott Safon was named as president of HLN, succeeding Jautz (who was promoted to president of the main CNN channel).

On November 4, 2011, HLN launched its own website at HLNtv.com, which featured content related to HLN television programs, and other "must see and must share" stories.

In May 2012, HLN acquired the rights to broadcast the Daytime Emmy Awards, beginning with the 39th annual event on June 23, 2012; this marked the first time that the awards ceremony was aired on pay television, instead of terrestrial television. With 912,000 viewers (not counting four repeat broadcasts, which brought the total to two million), the broadcast was "the most watched regularly scheduled, non-news telecast" ever on HLN.

==== Casey Anthony and Conrad Murray trials ====
Nancy Grace would achieve notoriety for its extensive coverage of the disappearance and death of two year-old Caylee Anthony; HLN was credited with having "almost single-handedly inflated the Anthony case from a routine local murder into a national obsession". HLN subsequently devoted a significant amount of coverage to the murder trial against Caylee's mother Casey Anthony—whom Grace referred to as the "tot mom" on-air—including live gavel-to-gavel coverage, followed by continued coverage and commentary during primetime programs such as Nancy Grace. HLN reached an average audience of 982,000 viewers in June 2011, and Nancy Grace experienced an 80% increase in viewership—second only to The O'Reilly Factor on Fox News in its time slot.

During the reading of the verdict on July 5, 2011, HLN achieved a record-high peak audience of 5.2 million viewers, while Nancy Grace achieved a record-high 2.9 million viewers, beating other basic cable news channels (including Fox News) in the 8 p.m. hour. HLN executive vice president Scot Safon called the trial "a gigantic deal" for the network.

Later that year, HLN provided similar coverage for the trial of Conrad Murray, who was accused of prescribing the drugs that caused the death of Michael Jackson. Although the Conrad Murray trial did not initially have as strong of an impact on ratings as the Casey Anthony trial, viewership began to increase during the testimony phase, and HLN reported that 2.1 million viewers were watching the network during the reading of the guilty verdict. The network reported a 98% year-over-year gain in viewership for the month of October 2011.

=== 2013–2015: Focus on social media ===
Logo used from January 13, 2015, to May 8, 2017.

Albie Hecht joined HLN as Executive Vice President and GM in September 2013. In November 2013, consumer advocate Clark Howard ended his five-year relationship with HLN, including his appearances on Morning Express with Robin Meade and Evening Express as well as his own eponymous weekend afternoon program. The move came in response to planned changes occurring at HLN, which sought to re-position the network as the "first TV home for the social media generation."

Throughout 2014, HLN's news content began to skew towards millennials, with an increasing focus on content popular on social networks alongside major headlines. For a period, HLN also aired RightThisMinute, a syndicated program focusing on viral videos. In June 2014, Time Warner made a bid to acquire a stake in Vice Media, with an intent for the company to take over and relaunch HLN. Time Warner abandoned the deal in August, and Vice subsequently partnered with A&E Networks to launch Viceland in 2016.

These plans culminated on January 13, 2015, when HLN underwent a major revamp in its programming and on-air presentation; the network introduced several new social media-themed programs, including the new afternoon block The Daily Share, Jack Vale: Offline – a docusoap following YouTuber Jack Vale, Ali Nejad's The Social Life, and Keywords, a social media-themed game show hosted by Summer Sanders. HLN also adopted an updated logo, and introduced a new set at Studio 7 of the CNN Center, used by Morning Express and The Daily Share. The new studio had a "coffee house"-styled design with no traditional anchor desk, and a "Social Circle" designed to encourage interaction between hosts and guests. T-Mobile US also signed on to serve as a sponsor for The Daily Share, allowing on-set branding and sponsored segments during the program.

In late-May 2015, The Daily Share was cut from five hours to two, with the remainder of its timeslot filled by CNN original series and specials, followed by next-day encores of Nancy Grace and Dr. Drew On Call.

=== 2016–2022: Change in strategy, integration of true crime programming ===
Logo used from May 8, 2017, to June 27, 2023.

On November 24, 2015, CNN Worldwide president Jeff Zucker announced, in a memo to network staff, that Hecht would depart HLN; Ken Jautz, who oversaw the network as its president prior to Hecht's appointment in 2013, would head the network in the interim. The memo outlined plans to restructure its daytime and overnight programming to more closely resemble CNN, including a focus on documentary films.

In June 2016, HLN announced that Erica Hill would re-join the network to host a new, afternoon program from New York later in the year. Later that month, HLN also announced that Michaela Pereira, a former anchor of CNN's New Day, would host the new Los Angeles-based morning show MichaeLA beginning on July 11, 2016. The new program was positioned as a companion to Morning Express, airing from 10:00 a.m. to 1:00 p.m. ET (7:00 a.m. to 10:00 a.m. PT), and promoted as a competitor to broadcast network morning shows tape-delayed from airings for the East Coast.

On June 30, 2016, Nancy Grace announced that she would end her show and leave HLN in October 2016, after nearly a decade with the network. It was replaced by a new legal news program, Primetime Justice with Ashleigh Banfield. Erica Hill's new program, On the Story, premiered on October 10, 2016.

In January 2017, HLN announced the January 27 premiere of How It Really Happened, a new documentary series hosted by Hill Harper reporting on the "most notorious crimes, mysteries, trials, and celebrity tragedies of our time". The series was the first production of CNN's Original Series Development staff that was developed specifically for HLN. On January 30, 2017, it was announced that CNN anchor Carol Costello would return to HLN to host a new program from Los Angeles. In March 2017, HLN announced that S.E. Cupp would host a new early-evening program on HLN, S. E. Cupp Unfiltered, beginning in June 2017.

On May 8, 2017, HLN underwent a rebranding, adopting a new logo and slogan, "News that hits home". The network began to position its news content towards regional headlines, crime, and entertainment stories — leaving CNN to focus upon "in-depth" political coverage and world affairs. In January 2018, HLN began to reintroduce the Headline News brand during its news programming (although HLN remains the network's primary name), and also introduced Headlines Now—a recap of top stories airing every half-hour during its daytime lineup.

In August 2018, S.E. Cupp Unfiltered was quietly moved to CNN as a weekly program on Saturday evenings. On October 16, 2018, HLN cancelled Across America with Carol Costello, MichaeLA, and Crime & Justice with Ashleigh Banfield. With the cancellation of the three shows, Morning Express with Robin Meade brought back its original five-hour timeslot from 6:00 a.m. to noon, and On the Story was expanded to three hours and will air from noon until 3:00 p.m.

By 2022, On the Story and other live programming such as True Crime Live had been cancelled, leaving only one news program each day – Morning Express on weekdays, and Weekend Express on Saturday and Sunday mornings – which were followed by true crime documentaries such as Forensic Files for the remainder of the broadcast day.

=== 2022–present: End of original live programming and decline ===
On December 1, 2022, as part of cost-cutting measures imposed by new owner Warner Bros. Discovery (WBD)—formed earlier that year with the merger of previous owner WarnerMedia with Discovery, Inc.—new CNN president Chris Licht announced that HLN would no longer produce original live news programming effective December 6, and that HLN would merge its operations with sister channel Investigation Discovery under Warner Bros. Discovery U.S. Networks head Kathleen Finch. Licht stated that the company was aiming to direct its resources towards CNN's "core news programming and products" going forward.

On December 6, the channel began simulcasting CNN This Morning daily during part of the previous Morning Express and Weekend Express timeslots, transitioning to the morning edition of CNN News Central as of February 26, 2024; one observer has indicated that HLN is still required to carry some news programming in order to fulfill contracts with cable providers. True crime documentary programs—primarily Forensic Files, though initially including original episodes of series commissioned prior to the restructuring such as Real Life Nightmare—air throughout the rest of the day, along with marathons of Warner Bros. Television drama series on weekends to promote their availability on the Max streaming service. Some analysts have suggested that this may be just a transitional move towards WBD using the channel space for a different format entirely.

In August 2026, HLN returned to airing trial coverage, airing CNN-produced coverage of the trial of Duane Davis, the suspect in the murder of rapper Tupac Shakur.

== Programming ==
Prior to its reformulation as a true crime channel, HLN's weekday lineup consisted primarily of rolling news programming during the morning and early afternoon. The final original news programs that aired under this format were Morning Express, a morning news program hosted by Robin Meade with co-anchors Bob Van Dillen, Jennifer Westhoven and Hines Ward, and Saturday and Sunday equivalent Weekend Express, hosted by Susan Hendricks, both of which were canceled in December 2022. As of this time, the only remaining live news program on the channel is a simulcast of the morning edition of CNN News Central, intended primarily to satisfy carriage agreements requiring a quota of live news programming on the channel.

HLN's remaining dayparts primarily feature a focus on true crime programming. The network has extensively aired reruns of the former Court TV series Forensic Files; as of April 2016, the program took up about 58% of the channel's weekly schedule. In March 2017, HLN executive Ken Jautz stated that the network was making an effort to produce more original series; some of the new series that were slated to premiere in 2017, including Beyond Reasonable Doubt, Something's Killing Me, Inside with Chris Cuomo (which premiered October 20), and the second season of How It Really Happened (whose first season premiered January 27, 2017), were designed to complement the popularity of Forensic Files and other true crime programs, as well as HLN's renewed focus on crime coverage as part of its news programming. After airing new episodes in simulcast with CNN in 2016, The Hunt with John Walsh moved to HLN for its fourth season. In February 2020, HLN premiered Forensic Files II, a revival of Forensic Files. In April 2024, How It Really Happened moved its first-run episodes to CNN.

HLN has occasionally experimented with entertainment programming carrying news and political themes; on February 12, 2015, HLN aired the film Glory under the banner News and a Movie, which was accompanied by panel discussions on the film's cultural relevance in the present day. Alongside TruTV, HLN also aired encores of special episodes of TBS's late night talk show Conan set in Cuba and Armenia. In November 2022, HLN aired a marathon of the first four seasons of Warner Bros.-produced political drama The West Wing over the Thanksgiving holiday weekend, marking the first time HLN had aired a scripted television series.

The network has also, in recent years, served as an additional outlet for TNT Sports broadcasts, including joining its sister channels in simulcasting Turner's golf event franchise The Match, and serving as an overflow channel in the event of conflicts with TBS, TNT, and TruTV.

At 4:00 a.m. ET on weekdays, HLN used to broadcast CNN Student News (formerly known as CNN Newsroom from its 1989 debut, not to be confused with the current CNN program of the same name), a 10-minute news program designed for broadcast in schools that is produced as part of the Cable in the Classroom initiative; the program is anchored by Carl Azuz, with reports on the day's news presented in a simplified format (and with stories featuring graphic imagery or adult themes usually left out from the program). It no longer airs on HLN as of 2014, but is still available as a free podcast on CNN's website and iTunes. On December 16, 2016, the program was renamed CNN 10.

== Distribution ==
Due to the channel's tradition of airing rolling news coverage, HLN had become popular with people who may not have time to watch lengthy news reports, and as a fast source of news for public locations like airports, bars, and many other places. Supermarkets that carried the discontinued CNN Checkout Channel service were offered a feed of Headline News to broadcast on its televisions.

The channel's program audio was also simulcast on AM radio stations across the country via Westwood One, including a station in Atlanta which was not owned by Turner, WCNN (today a sports talk station with the same call letters), which broadcast from CNN Center with local contributions; all of CNN's U.S. radio operations (including the HLN simulcast) were discontinued on April 1, 2012, as part of Westwood One's dissolution into Dial Global. HLN's audio feed was carried on XM Satellite Radio channel 123 and Sirius Satellite Radio channel 116. After the merger of both entities as SiriusXM, it was carried on channel 117. From February 2019 to May 2023, the audio simulcast was also distributed on Entercom's Radio.com (now Audacy) website and app. In mid 2025, the SiriusXM simulcast of HLN was dropped, along with other CNN-affiliated side channels (though the main CNN channel still remains).

On July 18, 2011, HLN launched TV Everywhere streaming through the CNN mobile app for subscribers on participating television providers.

=== Broadcast syndication ===
From its inception, Turner Broadcasting had syndicated portions of CNN2/Headline News's schedule to local television stations throughout the country—typically in half-hour or hour-long blocks—for broadcast in various timeslots of their choice (usually in morning, daytime or late access slots during the network's early years). Most of them were commercial outlets, including both major network affiliates and independent stations (some like WSVN in Miami, following its January 1989 affiliation switch from NBC to Fox, even carried it as a stand-in evening network newscast), though a few public television stations (such as PBS member WTTW in Chicago) carried blocks of its newscasts into the late 1980s.

WTBS, initially to encourage its national viewers to ask their local cable provider to carry the network full-time, aired a half-hour simulcast of Headline News each morning at 5:30 a.m. ET from the latter's inception until 1996 (a separate simulcast aired locally at 6:00 a.m. in the Atlanta market). Abbreviated Headline News broadcasts would also occasionally serve as filler (bookended by the NewsWatch intro and outro) before the start of movie presentations or live sporting events. (WPCH-TV, which fully separated its Atlanta signal from the national TBS feed in October 2007, aired a simulcast of the first hour of Morning Express daily at 6:00 a.m. until Meredith Corporation—which had been managing the station alongside CBS-affiliated sister WGCL-TV (now WANF) since 2011—completed its purchase of WPCH from Turner/Time Warner in 2017, replacing it with a simulcast of WGCL's local morning newscast.)

The early 1990s saw the culmination of Headline News' supplemental syndication model as many commercial stations (particularly affiliates of ABC, NBC and CBS) that were transitioning over to instituting 24-hour broadcasts began taking feeds of the channel's overnight programming, in lieu of scheduling syndicated entertainment programs, movies or infomercials to fill their previous nightly sign-off periods. Headline News had gained competition in that market during that approximate timeframe through the November 1989 launch of All News Channel, a hybrid syndicated news service and satellite television network (operated by the Hubbard Broadcasting–Viacom joint venture CONUS Communications) that also began syndicating its programming feed to stations seeking to fill local airtime in overnight time periods as well as other dayparts. In later years, even after the "Big Three" networks launched their own overnight news programs—Nightside on NBC, World News Now on ABC, and Up to the Minute on CBS—over the course of the 1991–92 season in the wake of the Gulf War (which they developed coincidentally to compete with CNN, which was lauded for its round-the-clock war coverage in early 1991), Headline News programming continued to air on many of their affiliates as a complement to the network broadcasts; besides this, it also provided them with an overnight news option during the weekend, when no such option was offered (outside of Nightside during its 1991–98 run).

The supplemental broadcast distribution ended following the 2005 introduction of the "Headline Prime" block, forcing many affiliates (including NBC stations that lost a network news option following the September 1998 cancellation of Nightside) to fill airtime previously reserved for Headline News broadcasts with syndicated and paid programming.

=== International ===
Until 1995, much of Headline News' programming was simulcast on sister channel CNN International; the channel's news ticker was not displayed on CNN International during its simulcasts of Headline News programming.

London's Thames Television, as part of their Thames Into The Night overnight service, briefly aired a half-hour of Headline News at 5:30 AM in 1988, before ITN launched their own early morning bulletin later that year.

Beginning in the mid-2000s, the channel has been available in certain countries outside the United States, particularly in Asia, Latin America, Middle East and North Africa. Although the international feed's programming lineup is identical to the U.S. feed, program teasers, stock market figures, and weather forecasts for Asian and Latin American, Middle East and North African cities are used as break fillers in lieu of US-oriented commercials.

In Canada, the American feed of HLN is available on most cable and satellite providers, as it is authorized for carriage as a foreign cable television service by the Canadian Radio-television and Telecommunications Commission; save for a few differences it features the same programming schedule as that seen in the United States, although some programs are blacked out to protect other rightsholders.

An hour of Morning Express aired on tape-delay during the overnight on the cable/satellite feed of CNN Philippines.

== High definition ==
HLN broadcasts in high definition 1080i resolution format. It is available nationally on nearly all pay-TV providers within the United States, and in Canada on satellite provider Bell Satellite TV, which downconverts the HD feed's picture resolution to 720p.

== Notable on-air staff ==
=== Final anchors and reporters ===
- Jean Casarez (HLN & CNN)
- Allison Chinchar (HLN & CNN)
- Coy Wire (HLN & CNN)

Notes

1. (HLN) – Indicates anchor/reporter who appeared exclusively on HLN
2. (HLN & CNN) – Indicates anchor/reporter who appears on both HLN and CNN

=== Former anchors and reporters ===
- Jane Akre
- Rudi Bakhtiar (now director of communications for the International Campaign for Human Rights in Iran; serves as senior advisor at Voice of America)
- Brooke Baldwin
- Ashleigh Banfield (now with NewsNation)
- Bobbie Battista (deceased)
- Michelle Bonner
- Mike Brooks
- Richard Brown
- Richelle Carey (now at Al Jazeera English)
- Helen Casey
- Virginia Cha (now at KGTV)
- Roby Chavez
- Jill Chernekoff
- Sophia Choi (now at WSB-TV)
- Brian Christie
- Leesa Clark (retired)
- Adrianna Costa
- Carol Costello
- Natasha Curry
- Christine Davidson
- Denise Dillon (now at WAGA-TV)
- Bud Elliott (now at KJWL)
- Marc Fein
- Holly Firfer
- Sasha Foo (now at KUSI)
- Peter Ford (retired)
- Judy Fortin (now at NewsCertified Exchange)
- Mike Galanos
- Courtney George
- Lori Geary (now at WSB-TV)
- David Goodnow (retired)
- Gordon Graham (deceased)
- Dan Hackel
- Don Harrison (deceased)
- Pat Harvey (now at KCBS-TV)
- Kara Henderson (now at NFL Network)
- Susan Hendricks
- Erica Hill (returned to CNN as a fill-in anchor and national correspondent)
- Micah Johnson
- Pat Kirk
- Cindy Klose
- Melissa Knowles
- Sachi Koto (now on the board of directors at The Japan-America Society of Georgia)
- Natisha Lance
- Nicole Lapin (now on The CW)
- Bob Losure (deceased)
- Richard Lui (now at MSNBC)
- Shyann Malone
- Miguel Marquez (now at CNN)
- Cami McCormick (now at CBS News)
- Janice McDonald
- Robin Meade
- Chloe Melas (now at NBC News)
- Dave Michaels
- Brian Nelson
- Kris Osborn
- Christina Park
- Christi Paul
- Michaela Pereira (now at KTTV)
- Elizabeth Prann (HLN)
- Jacque Reid
- Marilyn Ringo
- Chuck Roberts (retired)
- Thomas Roberts
- Lynne Russell
- Andy Scholes (still at CNN)
- Lynn Smith
- Kate Snow (now at NBC News)
- Linda Stouffer (now at WSB-TV)
- Andrea Thompson
- Nischelle Turner (now at Entertainment Tonight in Los Angeles, California)
- Bob Van Dillen
- Lyn Vaughn (now at Troy University)
- Gary Warner
- Jennifer Westhoven
- Jim Wilkerson
- Glenda Webb
- Rafer Weigel (now at ESPN Radio)
- Van Earl Wright (now owner/president at Wright Stuff Productions)
- Jay Young (deceased)
- Charles Zewe (now at Louisiana State University)

=== Former talk show hosts ===
- Brooke Anderson (now at Entertainment Tonight)
- Glenn Beck (now at TheBlaze TV)
- Joy Behar (returned to The View)
- S. E. Cupp (still with CNN)
- Nancy Grace (now with Fox Nation)
- A. J. Hammer
- Clark Howard (now retired from long-form radio and television)
- Drew Pinsky
- Jane Velez-Mitchell
