= Monica Jones Kaufman Pearson =

American journalist

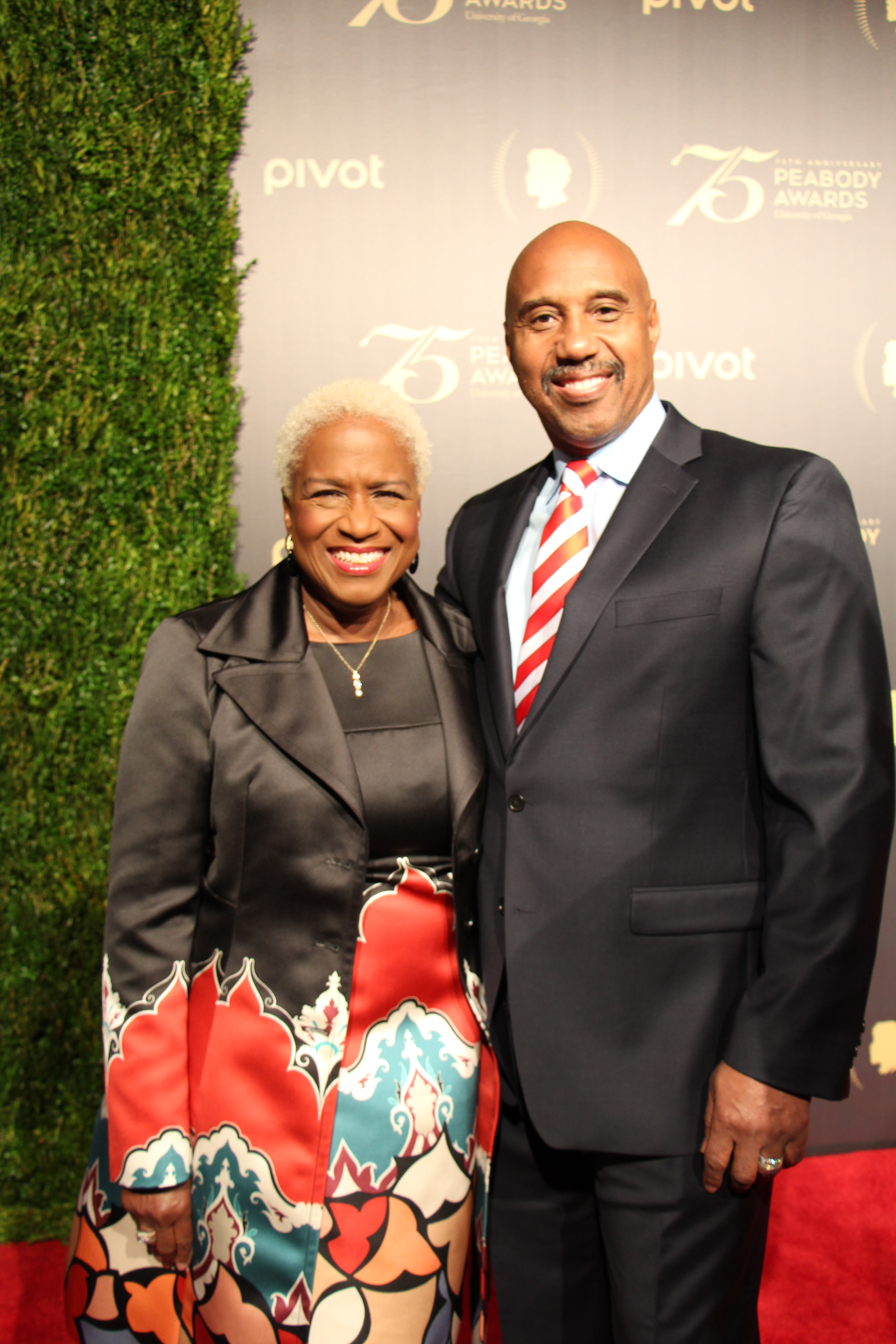
- Monica Pearson and her husband, John Pearson, at 2016 Peabody Awards
- Born: Monica Jones; October 20, 1947 (age 78); Louisville, Kentucky, U.S.
- Occupation: Journalist
- Years active: 1975–2012
- Known for: Anchor for Channel 2 Action News at five for WSB-TV
- Spouse: John E. Pearson Sr. (m. 2005)

Monica Jones Kaufman Pearson (born October 20, 1947) is an American journalist and news anchor. Pearson's career first started in Louisville, Kentucky, as an anchor and reporter for WHAS-TV, while also working as a reporter for the Louisville Times. When Pearson moved to Atlanta, Georgia, in 1975, she became the first female and African-American to anchor the evening news at WSB-TV.

== Early life and education ==
Monica Jones Kaufman Pearson was born in Louisville, Kentucky, on October 20, 1947, and attended Catholic school. Her mother, Hattie Wallace Jones Edmondson, worked at the Louisville Post Office and was one of their first African-American women employees. While in high school, Pearson worked at the local black-owned radio stations where she read prayers and performed voiceovers for religious programming. She graduated from Presentation Academy in 1965. Pearson earned her B.A. in English at the University of Louisville. Pearson also attended a summer program for minorities at Columbia University's Graduate School of Journalism. In 2014, Pearson graduated from University of Georgia's Henry W. Grady College of Journalism and Mass Communication with a master's degree in Mass Communication.

== Career ==
Pearson's career started in Louisville while working for Brown Forman Distiller in public relations and Louisville Times as a reporter before joining WHAS-TV as an anchor and reporter. After moving to Atlanta in 1975, Pearson worked at WSB-TV for 37 years and was the first female and first African-American to anchor the daily evening news for the station. She retired from broadcasting on July 25, 2012, with Jovita Moore taking her place. Since 2012, Pearson has been working with KISS 104.1 FM where she hosts her own weekly music and talk show on Sundays. For twenty years, Pearson hosted "Closeups" and conducted over 170 celebrity interviews for WSB-TV—many of which may still be seen on YouTube. She currently co-hosts A Seat at the Table on Georgia Public Broadcasting. Pearson currently hosts Monica Pearson One on One, a monthly interview program on Gray Television's WPCH-TV. She currently hosts The Monica Pearson Show on AJC, a video and podcast interview program, for local newspaper The Atlanta Journal-Constitution. She has also appeared in WANF's imaging campaign for Atlanta News First, the relaunched Gray Television newscasts for WANF and WPCH-TV.

== Awards and accomplishments ==
During her time as a news anchor, Pearson received over 33 Southern regional and local Emmy awards. After retiring in 2012, she was honored for her years of service to improving the lives of Georgia's citizens on- and off-air by the U.S. House of Representatives. In 2015, Pearson became the first African-American to become the chairperson of the United Way of Metropolitan Atlanta. In August 2016, Pearson was inducted into the National Association of Black Journalists Hall of Fame, University of Kentucky Journalism Hall of Fame, the Atlanta Press Club Hall of Fame, Georgia Association of Broadcasters Hall of Fame, and the Georgia Music Hall of Fame. Monica is a Tower Award recipient, awarded from her alma mater Presentation Academy, and has emceed the awards program for many years.

== Personal life ==
Pearson is a cancer survivor: 1998 for breast cancer and again in 2015 for liver cancer. She made her diagnoses public in hopes that others would see the importance of yearly check-ups.

Pearson has one daughter, Claire Patrice Deveaux, and one step-son, John E. Pearson, II. She lives with her husband John in Ansley Park in Atlanta.

== Works cited ==
- Ho, Rodney (March 30, 2010). "Monica Pearson Closeups' no longer a regular feature on WSB-TV after more than 20 years". The Atlanta Journal-Constitution.
- "Monica Kaufman Pearson". AHPBA.
- "Monica Pearson diagnosed with liver cancer". WSB-TV. April 22, 2015.
- "Monica Pearson". AAE Speaks.
- "Monica Pearson". Atlanta Homes and Lifestyles. Lifestyle. June 2012.
- "Monica Pearson's Biography". The History Makers.
