= Mike Brooks (journalist) =

American journalist (1955–2021)

Mike Brooks (March 29, 1955 – June 23, 2021) was a television news correspondent for CNN. He appeared regularly on HLN's Nancy Grace show, and Prime News and gave significant coverage of the Anna Nicole Smith paternity controversy, as well as the Virginia Tech massacre. Brooks was also seen on Tru TV's In Session (formerly Court TV), where he provided commentary as their law-enforcement analyst.

== Early life ==
Michael Joseph Brooks was born on March 29, 1955. Originally of Arlington, Virginia, Brooks was the son of Clarence Joseph "Joe" Brooks (1927–1999) and Margaret Mary Brooks. He graduated from Bishop Denis J. O'Connell High School in Arlington, before joining the DC Metropolitan Police Department in 1973.

== Career ==
Brooks was also a retired police detective, employed for 26 years by the Washington, D.C., Metropolitan Police Department. He was assigned to the Federal Bureau of Investigation Joint Terrorism Task Force, and also served as an instructor for several public safety courses. His work on the FBI Evidence Response and Rapid Deployment Team included assignments to the Khobar Towers bombing in Saudi Arabia, the United States Embassy bombing in Kenya, and the crash of TWA Flight 800. Brooks left Turner Broadcasting in October 2014.

== Personal life ==
Brooks was 6'7" tall.

He died on June 23, 2021, at the age of 66.
