= Chuck Roberts =

American broadcast journalist

Charles S. Roberts (born October 25, 1950, Santa Fe, New Mexico) is an American broadcast journalist, most notable for being the former weekday news anchor on Headline News, based at CNN's world headquarters in Atlanta, Georgia. He was the longest-serving anchor among the CNN networks, anchoring weekday broadcasts on what would later be known as HLN from that network's debut as CNN2 on January 1, 1982—when he was the first anchor on its airwaves—until his retirement on July 30, 2010.

From 1973–1975, Roberts anchored the evening news at KRGV-TV in Texas. Before joining KRGV, he was a newscaster at WHB Radio in Kansas City, Missouri from 1971–1973. From 1970–1971, he anchored morning newscasts at KOMU-TV, the NBC affiliate in Columbia, Missouri.

During his time at Headline News, Roberts led the network's coverage for each national election. In 1989, Roberts reported from a rooftop in Charleston, South Carolina, on Hurricane Hugo's arrival. In 1985, he reported live on the trial of Wayne Williams, who was convicted in the Atlanta child murders case. In 2003, the U.S. Army Forces Command in Atlanta asked Roberts to host the 228th birthday celebration of the U.S. Army.

Before joining Headline News, Roberts was the principal weeknight anchor at KMTV in Omaha, Nebraska. During that time, he conducted an exclusive interview with serial killer Caril Ann Fugate for KMTV and flew aboard the Strategic Air Command post-nuclear-attack airborne command post "Looking Glass".

Roberts is a member of the Atlanta Press Club and the National Society of Professional Journalists. He is a recipient of the 1971 University of Missouri Faculty/Student Award for Outstanding Journalism and, in 1998, was inducted into the New Mexico Military Institute's Hall of Fame for "lifetime achievement in service to the ideals of America."

Roberts is a graduate of the New Mexico Military Institute (NMMI), a State of New Mexico supported educational institution located in Roswell, New Mexico. He earned a bachelor's degree in journalism from the University of Missouri. He volunteers with Project for Humanity causes in Atlanta.

Roberts became known nationally in the summer of 2006 for referring in a question to Connecticut Senate candidate Ned Lamont as the "al-Qaeda" candidate. However, a Google search on August 12, 2006, showed no reference on the Internet in which someone referred to Lamont as such. Nevertheless, Roberts' comment led to calls in the blogosphere for an apology. On August 13, 2006, Arianna Huffington, in an interview with CNN, demanded that Roberts be held accountable for his comment and wondered why he wasn't "demoted to covering Paris Hilton or entertainment news where the truth doesn't matter.". Roberts apologized on air to Lamont during the afternoon of August 15, 2006, saying, "...I posed [the question] badly, stupidly..."

Today, Roberts works at WYAY Newsradio 106.7 in Atlanta, and serves as a consultant to them and its owner, Cumulus Media. He also provides reports for the station.
