= Lyn Vaughn =

American news anchor

Lyndell Elois Vaughn is an American broadcast journalist, most notable for her stint as a news anchor and reporter at Headline News in Atlanta from December 1984 to June 1998. Vaughn was the first Black anchor at CNN Headline News, a distinction recognized in profiles in Esquire, Essence, The New York Times, The Detroit News, and the Atlanta Constitution. Her on-air composure and distinctive delivery were frequently cited in those profiles as defining qualities of her presence on screen. She received an Emmy Award for her work at Headline News during her 14-year tenure at the network.

== Biography ==
Lyn Vaughn was born in the early 1950s in Natchitoches, Louisiana. She moved with her parents to Los Angeles and graduated from the University of California, Los Angeles, in 1971 with a degree in political science in June 1971.

Vaughn's first job in broadcasting was as a "desk assistant" or paid intern at all-news radio station WCBS in New York. She moved to Boston in 1974 with several members of the staff when CBS launched the all-news format at its station there, WEEI. Vaughn moved into television in 1979 at CBS affiliate WNAC and stayed with channel 7 when it became WNEV-TV in 1982. She declined an offer from WNEV to extend her contract and left Boston for Atlanta, where she became an evening news reporter and substitute anchor for WXIA-TV in 1983, taking a pay cut to move to the warm-weather city. Within months, she became the anchor for WXIA's 5:30 and 11 p.m. newscasts. She remained with the station until September 1984, when a major anchor shuffle saw her demoted to reporter; she charged that the new anchor lineup had too few Black people and women, while the station justified its decision with audience research. Months later, she joined the team of anchors at Headline News. While at Headline News, she was the anchor on the air when the Space Shuttle Challenger disaster unfolded.

Vaughn left Headline News in June 1998; in a letter to the Atlanta Journal-Constitution, she explained that she turned down a three-year renewal for personal reasons. In 1999, she joined the staff of WTKR in Norfolk, Virginia, leaving abruptly in April 2001. While in Norfolk, she met her husband, Wesley Vann, who worked at Norfolk State University.

In 2004, Vaughn became the spokeswoman for Fulton County district attorney Paul Howard. During this time, she also hosted a government-access cable show.
