= Robert Greenblatt =

American television executive

- Born: 1959/1960 (age 66-65); Rockford, Illinois, USA
- Education: University of Southern California; University of Wisconsin; University of Illinois; Boylan Catholic High School
- Occupation: Television executive
- Notable work: 9 to 5
- Television: The Voice; Parenthood; Chicago Fire
- Awards: Norman Felton Producer of the Year Award in Episodic Television Drama

Robert Greenblatt (born 1959/1960) is an American television executive, former chairman of NBC Entertainment and former chairman of WarnerMedia Entertainment. He has since launched his production company, The Green Room.

== Early life and education ==
Greenblatt was born and raised in Rockford, Illinois, USA. He was raised Catholic and attended Boylan Catholic High School. He earned a Bachelor of Fine Arts in theatre management from the University of Illinois and a Master of Arts in arts administration from the University of Wisconsin's Madison School of Business. He also earned a Master of Fine Arts from the USC School of Cinema-Television's Peter Stark Producing Program.

== Career ==
Greenblatt began his television career at the Fox Broadcasting Company, where he ran prime-time programming and developed such shows as the original Beverly Hills, 90210 and Melrose Place, The X-Files, and Party of Five.

From 1997 to 2003, Greenblatt was a producer (along with David Janollari through their production company, The Greenblatt Janollari Studio) of over a dozen series for various networks, including Six Feet Under, along with the 2005 miniseries Elvis and Gregory Nava's American Family for PBS.

From 2003 to 2010, Greenblatt was President of Entertainment for Showtime. He supervised a slate of original programming that dramatically repositioned the pay channel as a leader in the premium cable business. Under his leadership, he developed and supervised award-winning shows like Weeds, Dexter, Californication, The Tudors, Nurse Jackie, and United States of Tara.

As a theatrical producer, Greenblatt developed the musical stage adaptation of 9 to 5, which premiered on Broadway in April 2009 and closed September 2009, with the National Tour starting in September 2010. It was nominated for four Tony Awards.

Greenblatt was the chairman of NBC Entertainment. He succeeded Jeff Gaspin in January 2011 after Comcast took control of the newly renamed NBCUniversal.

On March 4, 2019, Greenblatt was named as the chairman of WarnerMedia Entertainment as part of AT&T's reorganization of WarnerMedia. He oversaw HBO, Cinemax, TBS, TNT and TruTV. He was responsible for helping oversee the development of HBO Max, the company's streaming service which launched in May 2020. He was fired from WarnerMedia in August 2020 amid restructuring. More recently, he launched his own production company with a deal at Lionsgate. Most recently, he shifted his production company The Green Room to NBCUniversal in 2026.

== Politics ==
In August 2016, Greenblatt labeled then presidential candidate Donald Trump as "toxic" and "demented".

== Personal life ==
Greenblatt is the first and only openly gay broadcast TV president.

Preceded by Jeff Gaspin	Chairman of NBC Entertainment; 2011–2018	Succeeded by George Cheeks and Paul Telegdy
