= Shift (MSNBC) =

Online streaming network

- Type: Internet streaming
- Country: United States
- Owner: NBCUniversal; MSNBC
- Launch date: July 13, 2014; 12 years ago
- Dissolved: 2015; 11 years ago
- Former names: msnbc2
- Official website: Official website

Shift (stylized as shift by msnbc, formerly msnbc2) was an online live-streaming video network run by MSNBC. It was launched in July 2014 to provide a platform for original video series which diverge from the MSNBC television network's political focus.

== History ==
In July 2014, MSNBC.com launched msnbc2, a brand for several web-only series hosted by MSNBC personalities, in December 2014, msnbc2 was renamed shift by msnbc, with a daily live stream and programming schedule which was less focused on politics and is more tailored to a younger audience. The channel was later shut down.

== Programming ==
=== Programs ===
- Sports Matters hosted by Rob Simmelkjaer (released Mondays)
- Reporter's Notebook hosted by Beth Fouhy (released Mondays)
- Changing America hosted by Voto Latino CEO Maria Teresa Kumar (released Tuesdays)
- The Docket hosted by attorney Seema Iyer (released Tuesdays)
- The Book Report hosted by Richard Wolffe (released Tuesdays)
- Road Map hosted by Ayman Mohyeldin (released Wednesdays)
- Nerding Out hosted by Dorian Warren (released Thursdays)
- Code Forward hosted by Nellie Bowles and Jason Del Rey (co-produced by Re/code, released Thursdays)
- The Briefing hosted by Luke Russert (released Fridays)
- So Popular! hosted by Janet Mock (released Fridays)
- Just Faith hosted by Rev. Jacqui Lewis (released Fridays)
- REACH! hosted by Natalie Auzenne (released Saturdays)
- shift-only version of First Look hosted by Betty Nguyen
- msnbc Originals
- Three Cents hosted by Josh Barro
- Krystal Clear hosted by Krystal Ball
- Out There hosted by Thomas Roberts
- Greenhouse hosted by Tony Dokoupil

== See also ==
- HuffPost Live
- CBS News (streaming service)
- AJ+
- NBC News Now
- ABC News Live
