= Bishop O'Connell High School =

Catholic high school in Virginia, USA

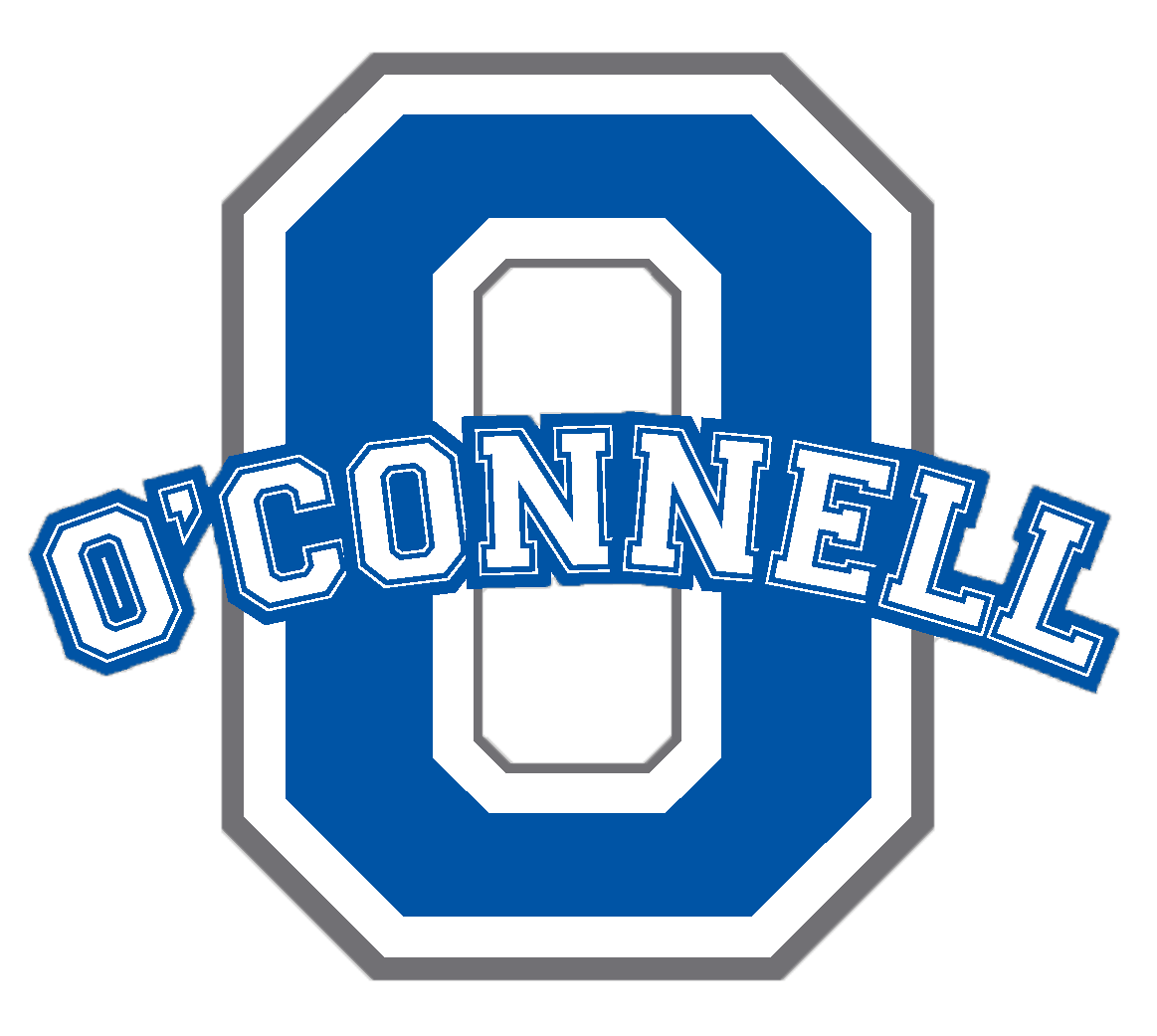

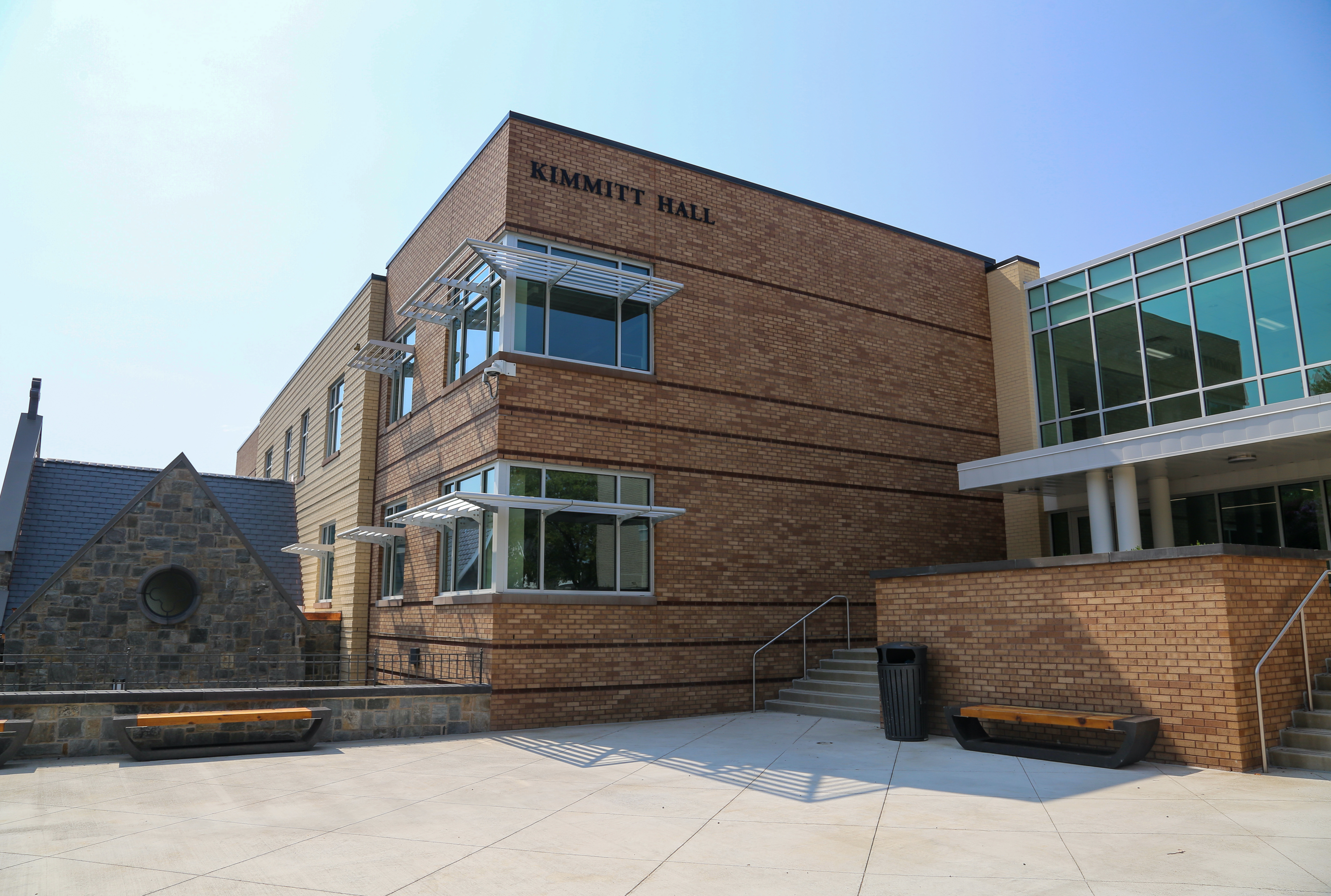
- Kimmitt Hall at Bishop O'Connell High School

Location
- 6600 Little Falls Road; Arlington County, Virginia 22213; United States; 38.894753°N 77.161094°W

Information
- Type: Private; college preparatory; day; Catholic school
- Religious affiliation: Catholic Church
- Established: 1957
- Oversight: Diocese of Arlington
- Head of school: Jonathan Brand
- Grades: 9–12
- Gender: Co-educational
- Enrollment: Approx. 1,240 (2025-2026)
- Student to teacher ratio: 14:1
- Campus: Suburban
- Colors: Royal Blue, White and Silver
- Athletics conference: Washington Catholic Athletic Conference
- Nickname: Knights, O’Connell, DJO, OC
- Team name: Knights
- Rival: Paul VI Catholic High School
- Accreditation: Southern Association of Colleges and Schools
- Newspaper: The Visor
- Yearbook: The Shield
- School fees: PTO: $125; Registration fee for sophomores, juniors and seniors: $350; Registration fee for freshmen: $500; Senior fee: $375
- Tuition: Catholic: $22,903; Non-Catholic: $25,434; International students: $29,231
- Website: bishopoconnell.org

Bishop Denis J. O'Connell High School (also known as DJO) is a private, Catholic college preparatory school founded in 1957 in Arlington County, Virginia. It was established by the Diocese of Richmond, but it has been under the direction of the Diocese of Arlington since 1974. The school is named for Bishop Denis J. O'Connell, Bishop of Richmond from 1912 to 1926.

== Brief history ==
On September 9, 1957, under the auspices of the Catholic Diocese of Richmond, Bishop Denis J. O'Connell High School opened its doors as a co-institutional college preparatory school, admitting 360 ninth-graders. Greeting the class of 1961 were Brothers of Christian Schools and Sisters, Servants of the Immaculate Heart of Mary (IHM), who would guide their education. Since then, Bishop O'Connell has graduated more than 18,000 men and women. Today, the school serves the students from more than 80 different schools throughout the Washington, D.C. metropolitan area.

== Academics ==
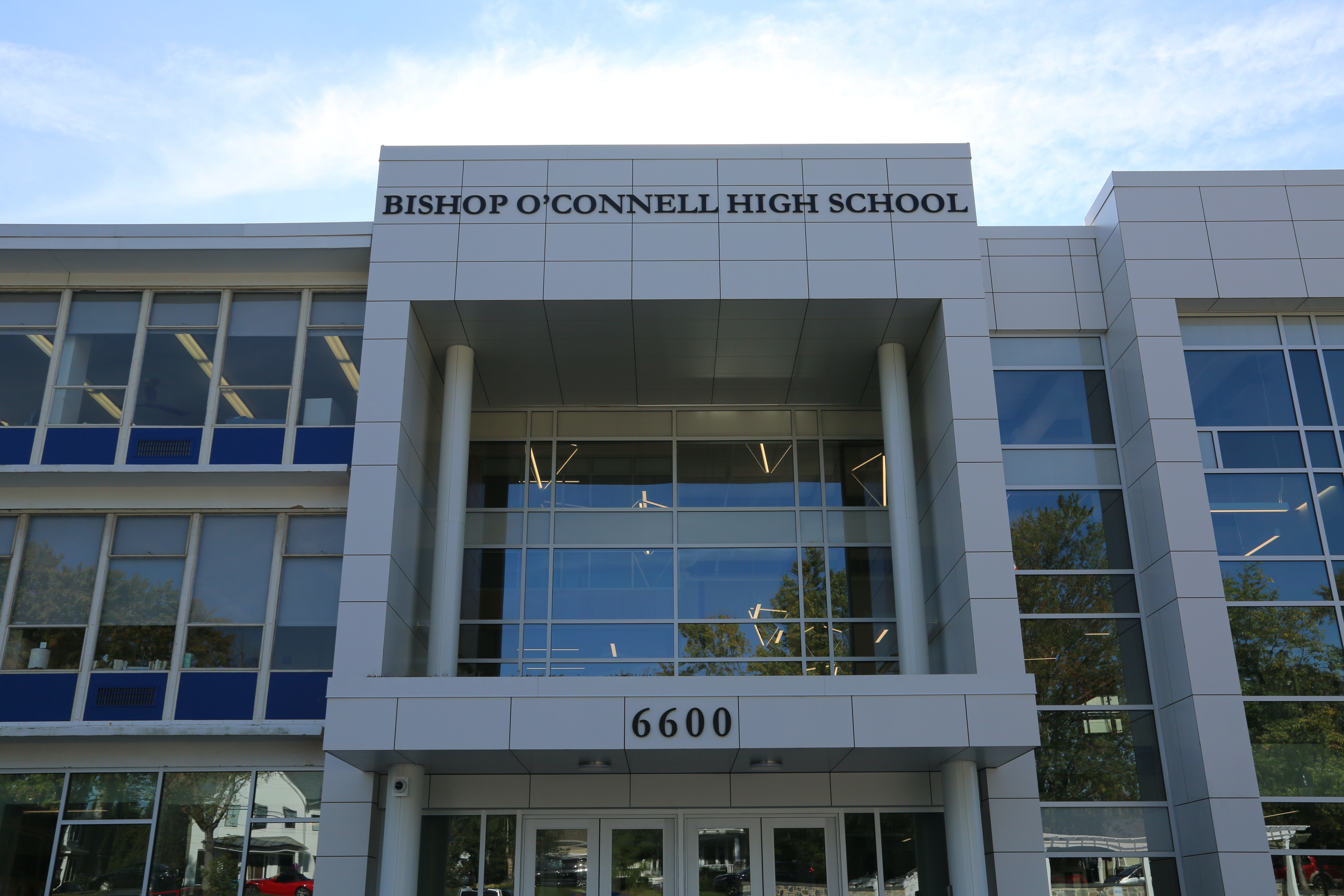
Bishop O'Connell High School (front entrance)

Bishop O'Connell High School holds high expectations for its students, faculty, and staff. The academic program is organized around required courses that aim to achieve desired learning goals for each student. All students follow a demanding college preparatory curriculum designed to ready them for admission to the leading colleges and universities. The Muller Academic Services Program provides support for students with documented learning disabilities. Coursework is available at the Honors and Advanced Placement levels. Dual credit and dual enrollment opportunities are also available through a partnership with Marymount University. The Global Studies Certificate Program offers optional beyond-the-classroom learning experiences focused on themes of world importance. The school also offers Expanded Services for students with intellectual and cognitive disabilities.

== Activities ==
=== Athletics ===
Bishop O'Connell High School participates in the Washington Catholic Athletic Conference (WCAC). In this league, O'Connell participates in all major sports against other Catholic high schools of the D.C. metro area.

==== Basketball ====
===== Boys' Varsity Team =====
These are some statistics from the last five years of O'Connell Varsity Boys' Basketball:

- 137 Victories
- 2 WCAC Regular Season Championships
- 1 WCAC Tournament Championship
- 3 Alhambra Catholic Invitational Championships
- .815 Winning Percentage

==== Soccer ====
The Girls' Varsity Soccer team were National Champions in 2004.

=== Charitable events ===
==== Superdance ====
The O'Connell Superdance is an annual 12-hour dance-a-thon held at the school which raises money for the Cystic Fibrosis Foundation. The Superdance is organized and run by students. It was started under the administration of principal Msgr. James McMurtrie. O'Connell students began holding the Superdance in 1976 because students wanted to speed the discovery of a cure for cystic fibrosis (CF), a fatal disease of the lungs which had claimed the life of sophomore Brenda O'Donnell on April 14, 1975. Her sister, Maura, was a senior in 1976 and also suffered from cystic fibrosis. Their brother, Sean, died of cystic fibrosis that same year.

Maura O'Donnell graduated and went on to nursing school at Marymount University, continuing to support the Superdance in hopes that a cure would be found. Her last Superdance was in 1978 when she came out of the hospital just for the event. In a speech delivered to the O'Connell community, she stated:

"All of you I know have dreams – dreams of college, of success, of love and happiness – dreams of the future. We with cystic fibrosis have dreams too. Your wonderful all-out efforts and work for this dance-a-thon may help make some of our dreams come true."

Two months later, she died of this disease.

As of 2026, O'Connell students have raised over $6,000,000 for the Cystic Fibrosis Foundation, an organization dedicated to finding a cure for the disease.

==== Hearty Soup Drive and Living Rosary ====
The Hearty Soup Drive is held annually throughout the month of October. Students have a month to collect as many cans of hearty soup as possible. At the end of the month, cans are collected and donated to the local Catholic Charities food bank. The school collects approximately 10,000 cans of soup each year. At the end of the week, all the cans are displayed on the football field (weather permitting) or inside the auditorium. The student body gathers to celebrate their successful event and pray a special Living Rosary, praying for those who will ultimately benefit from their soup collection.

== Notable alumni ==
- Mary Catherine “Taffy” Nivert (Class of 1962) - Grammy-award winning singer-songwriter
- Robert Kimmitt (Class of 1965) - Former United States Deputy Secretary of the Treasury and U.S. Ambassador to Germany
- Bob Asher (Class of 1966) - Played for the Dallas Cowboys and Chicago Bears.
- Mark Kimmitt (Class of 1972) - Former Assistant Secretary of State
- Mike Brooks (Class of 1973) - Television news correspondent
- James Nealon (Class of 1973) - Former U.S. Ambassador
- James Morhard (Class of 1974) - Former Deputy Administrator of NASA and deputy sergeant-at-arms of the U.S. Senate
- Mike Storm (Class of 1977) - Former pentathlete and Olympic silver medalist
- Edward DeMarco (Class of 1978) - Former acting director of the Federal Housing and Finance Agency (FHFA)
- Eric Metcalf (Class of 1985) - Former University of Texas and NFL player and three-time Pro Bowl selection for the Cleveland Browns and Los Angeles Chargers. Was also a college long jumper who won the NCAA National Long Jump Championship in 1986 and 1988
- David Monahan (Class of 1989): Actor
- Pat McGee (Class of 1991): Singer-songwriter, guitarist; founding member and frontman of the Pat McGee Band
- Jimmy Lange (Class of 1993) - Former professional boxer
- Terrence Wilkins (Class of 1994) - Former University of Virginia and NFL player, and won Super Bowl XLI with the Indianapolis Colts
- Casey Crawford (Class of 1995) - Former University of Virginia and NFL player, and Super Bowl XXXVII winner with the Tampa Bay Buccaneers; CEO and co-founder of Movement Mortgage
- Geoff Sprung (Class of 1996) - Member of the band Old Dominion
- Gibran Hamdan (Class of 1998) - Former Indiana University and NFL player, played for the Buffalo Bills
- Nataly Arias (Class of 2004) - Member of the Colombia National Soccer team during the 2011 Women's World Cup in Germany and the 2015 Women's World Cup in Canada. Two-time Olympian representing Colombia in the 2012 Olympics in London, England, and 2016 in Rio de Janeiro, Brazil.
- Marcus Ginyard (Class of 2005) - Former University of North Carolina and professional player
- Kate Ziegler (Class of 2006) - Former world record holder in the 1500m freestyle
- Kika Toulouse (Class of 2007) - Former professional player in the NWSL
- Jason Clark (Class of 2008) - Former Georgetown and current professional player
- Kendall Marshall (Class of 2010) - Former University of North Carolina and professional player
- Junior Etou (Class of 2013) - Congolese basketball player for Hapoel Be'er Sheva of the Israeli Basketball Premier League
- Keljin Blevins (Class of 2014) - Former Montana State and Portland Trail Blazers player
- Kamrin Moore (Class of 2014) - Former Boston College and NFL player, played the New York Giants
- Melo Trimble (Class of 2014) - Former University of Maryland and current professional player
- Matt Lewis (Class of 2017) - Former James Madison University and professional player for the Iowa Wolves
- Xavier Johnson (Class of 2018) - Former Indiana University player and professional player
- Kathryn Sandercock (Class of 2018) - Former Florida State University and current professional softball player for the Chicago Bandits
