= Bob Losure =

American television journalist (1947–2019)

Robert C. Losure (May 4, 1947 – July 19, 2019) was a weekend anchor on CNN Headline News from 1986 to 1997. Earlier in his career he worked as co-anchor of the evening news at KOTV, the CBS affiliate in his hometown of Tulsa, Oklahoma and before that as the reporter for Tulsa's AM radio station KRMG. Earlier on, he was one of the 20/20 News anchors during the "Big 8" years at CKLW radio in Windsor / Detroit. He was also the reporter for CNN Newsource, a service supplying news reports to local television stations, a field in which he had begun his career. After leaving CNN, he wrote a biography, Five Seconds to Air and made promotional speeches. He appeared in the Magic Jack infomercial and in a commercial promoting the conservative NewsMax magazine as well as in corporate videos. He was a member of the Pi Kappa Alpha fraternity.
