= KMUC =

- Columbia, Missouri; United States
- Broadcast area: Columbia, Missouri
- Frequency: 90.5 MHz
- Branding: 90.5 FM Classical

Programming
- Format: Classical music

Ownership
- Owner: University of Missouri; (The Curators of the University of Missouri)
- Sister stations: KBIA, KOMU-TV

History
- First air date: 1965 (as KWWC)
- Former call signs: KWWC (1965–2015)
- Call sign meaning: "K-Music"

Technical information
- Licensing authority: FCC
- Facility ID: 63328
- Class: A
- ERP: 1,250 watts
- HAAT: 40 meters (130 ft)
- Transmitter coordinates: 38°57′12.00″N 92°19′5.00″W

Links
- Public license information: Public file; LMS
- Webcast: Listen live
- Website: kmuc.org

KMUC (90.5 FM) is a radio station broadcasting a classical music format. Licensed to Columbia, Missouri, United States, the station is owned by the University of Missouri, alongside NPR affiliate KBIA and NBC affiliate KOMU-TV.

The program Mizzou Music runs weekly featuring interviews and performances by faculty and students of the University of Missouri School of Music.

== History ==
In November 2014, owner Stephens College announced it would sell the then-KWWC-FM to the University of Missouri, which already owned NPR member station KBIA (91.3). Once the sale was completed, the classical music format heard on KBIA during the daytime was moved to 90.5, while the 91.3 signal would have a news/talk/information format similar to sister stations KWMU in St. Louis and KCUR-FM in Kansas City. The call letters were also to be changed to KMUC.

The station changed its call sign to KMUC on October 29, 2015, and changed its format to classical music on October 31, 2015.
