= KOMU-TV =

Television station in Columbia, Missouri

- Columbia–Jefferson City, Missouri; United States
- City: Columbia, Missouri
- Channels: Digital: 27 (UHF); Virtual: 8
- Branding: KOMU 8; Mid-Missouri CW (8.3)

Programming
- Affiliations: 8.1: NBC; 8.3: CW+

Ownership
- Owner: University of Missouri; (The Curators of the University of Missouri)
- Sister stations: KBIA, KMUC

History
- First air date: December 21, 1953
- Former channel numbers: Analog: 8 (VHF, 1953–2009); Digital: 36 (UHF, 2002–2009), 8 (VHF, 2009–2023); Translator: 7 K07SD Rolla
- Former affiliations: NBC (1953–1982); CBS (secondary, 1953–1955); DuMont (secondary, 1953–1955); ABC (secondary 1953–1971, primary 1982–1985)
- Call sign meaning: Ozarks (region served), and University of Missouri's initials transposed

Technical information
- Licensing authority: FCC
- Facility ID: 65583
- ERP: 1,000 kW
- HAAT: 266 m (873 ft)
- Transmitter coordinates: 38°53′21″N 92°15′43.2″W

Links
- Public license information: Public file; LMS
- Website: www.komu.com

KOMU-TV (channel 8) is a television station licensed to Columbia, Missouri, United States, serving the Columbia–Jefferson City market as an affiliate of NBC and The CW Plus. The station's studios and transmitter are located on US 63 southeast of downtown Columbia. Owned by the University of Missouri and operated by the Missouri School of Journalism, KOMU-TV is one of only two commercial television stations in the United States to be operated by a public university, alongside the University of Alabama's WVUA-CD; all other such stations are non-profit PBS members.

== History ==
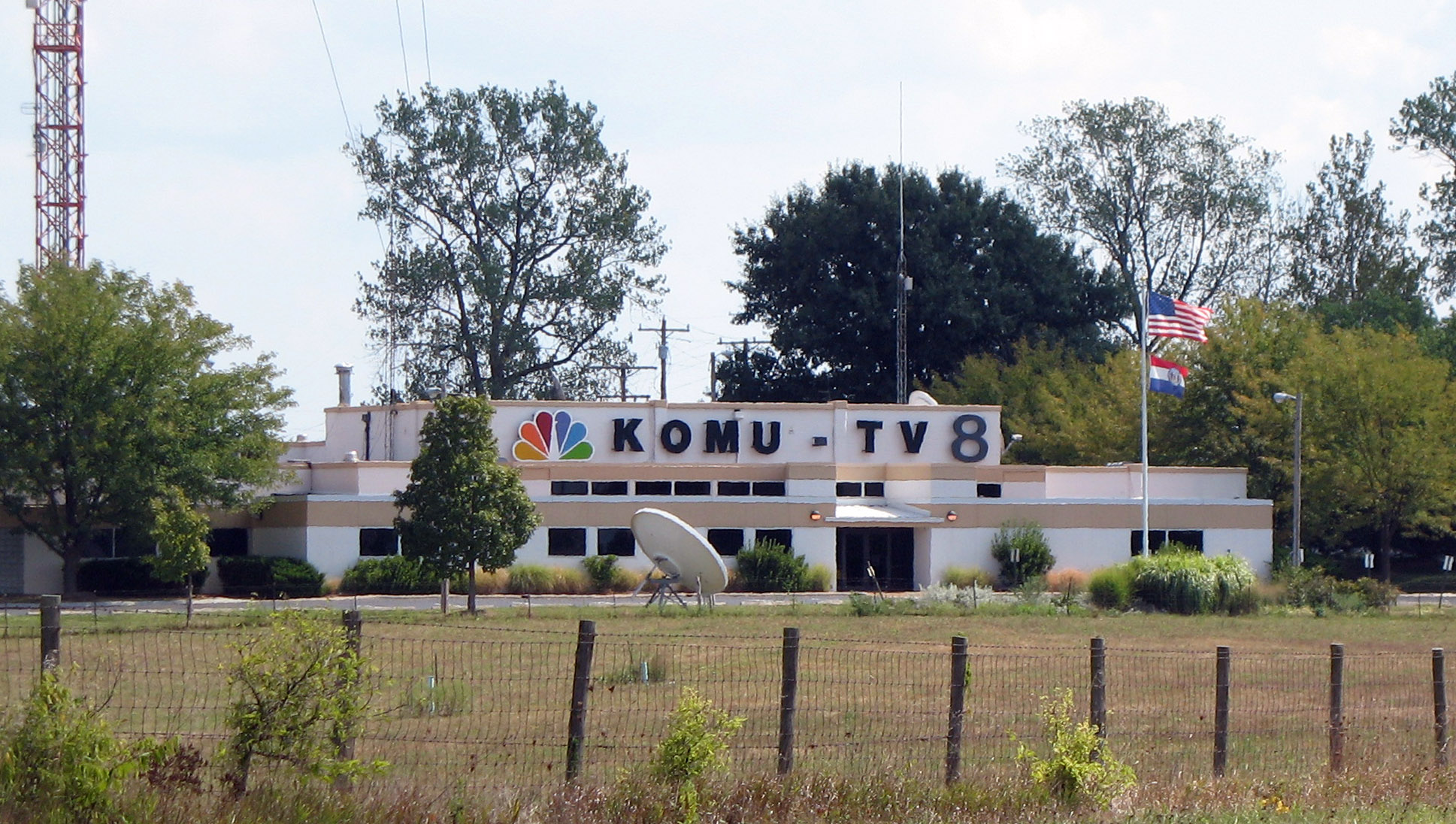
KOMU-TV's studios, designed by Jamieson and Spearl, on US 63 south of Columbia.

KOMU-TV was the brainchild of Edward C. Lambert, a longtime journalism professor at the University of Missouri, and Lester E. Cox, chairman of the Television Committee of the Board of Curators, who wanted to give journalism students a hands-on experience by working at a full-fledged commercial station. Cox presented a request to the Federal Communications Commission (FCC), earning a grant for commercial operation in January 1953. The station began airing an analog signal on VHF channel 8 on December 21, 1953, and carried programming from all four major networks at the time, but was a primary NBC affiliate. It lost both DuMont and CBS in 1955 when KRCG (channel 13) began operations from nearby Jefferson City. The two then shared ABC until 1971 when KCBJ-TV (channel 17, now KMIZ) launched, leaving KOMU as a full-time NBC station. From January 22 through April 23, 1955, KOMU temporarily originated a live prime time ABC network show, Ozark Jubilee.

On March 11, 1969, the original studios of KOMU were heavily damaged by an explosion and a fire (caused by an air conditioner failure), forcing the station to go off the air during NBC's Tuesday Night at the Movies. Nobody was reported injured when the blast occurred. The station returned to the air the following week after the fire was extinguished.

On August 8, 1982, ABC moved its affiliation to the station, since the network was the highest-rated at the time and wanted a stronger outlet. However, KOMU would not be an ABC affiliate for very long. By 1985, KOMU was one of several ABC affiliates nationwide that were underwhelmed by the network's ratings and programming in its 3 1/2 seasons with them. Meanwhile, NBC had regained the ratings lead. Accordingly, KOMU rejoined NBC on December 30, 1985 (reversing the 1982 swap with channel 17, which would become KMIZ concurrent to this). In 2002, KOMU took over operation of cable-only WB affiliate "KJWB" as part of The WB 100+. KMIZ had previously operated it, but relinquished control over it to KOMU after its parent company went bankrupt. This service was known on-air as "Mid-Missouri's WB 5" after its cable channel and, as a result, had a fictional callsign (as did most cable-only WB affiliates).

In 2002, KOMU won the Payne Award for Ethics in Journalism for maintaining its longstanding policy of banning political symbols on air. The station had come under considerable government and popular pressure to allow its anchors and reporters to wear American flag lapels on air in the aftermath of the September 11 attacks. In December 2005, the station added NBC Weather Plus to a new second digital subchannel and live streaming video on its website. This was added to Mediacom digital systems on January 12, 2007. After the national service shut down on December 1, 2008, it was replaced with Universal Sports but was not added to other digital cable systems. In 2011, Universal Sports was dropped from subchannel 8.2.

It was announced on April 12, 2006, that "KJWB" would become part of The CW and be added as a new third digital subchannel of KOMU to offer non-cable viewers access to the new network. "KJWB" joined The CW at the network's launch on September 18 and began to use the KOMU-DT3 call sign in an official manner. As a result, the station became the first and only educational institution-owned channel in the United States to affiliate with that network. Since KMIZ operated the area's cable-exclusive UPN station "KZOU", that station joined the other new network known as MyNetworkTV that was created to compete against The CW.

In late 2020, KOMU-TV submitted an application to the FCC to allow the construction of a new transmission tower roughly 600 feet (183 m) away from the current tower. The new tower would be almost 100 feet (30 m) higher and would broadcast with about 74 times more power than the current tower. This would coincide with KOMU-TV changing its RF channel from VHF channel 8 to UHF channel 27. The application was approved sometime in early 2021. The new tower's construction and testing was completed on January 5, 2023, and it began broadcasting four days later. The old tower was torn down in July of the same year as it was no longer in service when the signal switched to the new tower.

== News operation ==
KOMU presently airs 31 hours of locally-produced newscasts each week (with five hours each weekday, 3 1/2 hours on Saturdays and 2 1/2 hours on Sundays). Unusual for its market size, KOMU begins its weekday morning show at 4:30 a.m., reflecting a recent trend of television stations airing a pre-5 a.m. broadcast (most stations ranked 75th and above in the Nielsen rank usually air morning newscasts at 5:30 or 6 a.m.). KOMU used to be the only station in the area that began its early-morning newscast this early, but that changed with KRCG having launched a 4:30 a.m. newscast in 2020.

Originally, School of Journalism students generally served as KOMU-TV interns providing behind-the-scenes assistance with production and direction, with some on-air reporting. However, since 1970, most of the station's reporters and photographers have been undergraduate and/or graduate students, who rotate at the station on a weekly and semester basis. In addition, students serve as weekend and substitute anchors, and some of them also work as producers. However, like other commercial outlets, the station does employ paid professional staff as managers, engineers, and sales representatives. The editors and main on-air anchors, as well as most of the producers, are actually School of Journalism faculty members. Due to the large number of unpaid interns, KOMU has a significantly larger news department than is usually the case for a small-to-medium market.

MU has always devoted significant resources to KOMU's news operation, resulting in a higher-quality product than conventional wisdom would suggest for what has always been a small market (it is currently the 135th market, the second-smallest Missouri-based market with three full Big Three affiliates). As a result, it has spent most of its history as the dominant station in Mid-Missouri, according to Nielsen ratings. Historically, KOMU has dominated Columbia and the northern half of the market, while KRCG leads in Jefferson City and the southern half. At the turn of the millennium, this pattern had progressed to the extent that the two cities were a single market in name only. In the late 2006 sweeps, however, KOMU lost the lead at 10 p.m. to KRCG—the first time in memory that KOMU had lost any timeslot. However, it still remained a solid runner-up at 10, and led in all other timeslots.

On August 8, 2008, the station became the first in the market to offer local newscasts in high definition making Mid-Missouri the third-smallest market in the country to feature local broadcasts in HD. On April 23, 2009, KOMU debuted a new set specifically designed for high definition television. Starting July 5, 2010, the station began producing three newscasts for its CW-affiliated third digital subchannel. This included KOMU 8 News at 9 on The CW every night for a half-hour. The prime time show competed with the KMIZ-produced show on Fox affiliate KQFX-LD.

On September 12, 2011, KOMU-TV started a new weekday 4 p.m. newscast, which replaced The Oprah Winfrey Show; it featured news, events and local weather, and gave viewers a chance to share their opinions on news stories through social media outlets. The award-winning Sarah Hill anchors the hour-long newscast. On January 9, 2012, U_News moved to 11 a.m. and was shortened to a half-hour. On April 23, 2012, the program was reformatted as a traditional newscast and moved once again to noon (the U_News title was also dropped from the newscast); social media involvement in the newscast continued to be included, though in a downscaled form.

Like all CW Plus stations in the Central Time Zone, KOMU-DT3 also offered the nationally syndicated morning show The Daily Buzz on weekdays from 5 to 8 a.m. until the show's sudden cancellation by its distributor in mid-April 2015. KOMU operates its own weather radar, known as "Live Doppler 8 First Alert Radar", next to its studios. KOMU's website features a live streaming video feed of all newscasts.

=== Notable former on-air staff ===
- John Anderson
- Sophia Choi
- Major Garrett
- Phil Keating
- Michael Kim
- Russ Mitchell
- Lisa Myers
- Chuck Roberts
- Alex Rozier
- Richard Schlesinger
- Jon Scott
- Elizabeth Vargas
- Matt Winer

== Technical information ==
=== Subchannels ===
The station's signal is multiplexed:

Subchannels of KOMU-TV
Subchannel	Res.	Short name	Programming
8.1	1080i	KOMU-DT	NBC
8.3	720p	KOMU-CW	The CW Plus

=== Analog-to-digital conversion ===
KOMU-TV shut down its analog signal, over VHF channel 8, on June 12, 2009, the official date on which full-power television stations in the United States transitioned from analog to digital broadcasts under federal mandate. The station's digital signal relocated from its pre-transition UHF channel 36 to VHF channel 8 for post-transition operations.

=== Former translator ===
The station also operated a translator, K07SD in Rolla, Missouri, in the westernmost area of the St. Louis market. The translator operated on analog VHF channel 7. The license for that translator was canceled by the FCC no later than June 2010.
