= Jeff Gaspin =

American businessman (born 1960)

- Born: Jeffrey Mark Gaspin; December 29, 1960 (age 65); Bayside, New York, U.S.
- Education: Binghamton University (B.A.); New York University (M.B.A.)
- Occupation: formerly Chairman of NBC Universal Television Entertainment
- Employer: formerly NBC Universal
- Spouse: Karen Gaspin
- Children: 3
- Website: Gaspin's Executive Biography at NBC Universal

Jeffrey Mark Gaspin (born December 29, 1960) is an American television executive and former chairman of NBC Universal Television Entertainment. Gaspin resigned his position in late 2010, as a precursor to Comcast taking controlling ownership of the now newly rechristened NBCUniversal, which occurred on January 28, 2011. Robert Greenblatt, former president of entertainment of Showtime Networks Inc., succeeded Gaspin. Gaspin founded Gaspin Media, a production and consulting company, in 2012, and co-founded TAPP TV, a subscription-based online TV network, in 2013.

== Early life ==
Jeff Gaspin was born into a Jewish family in Bayside, New York. His parents wanted him to become a doctor, so he took pre-med courses. "That's what you did when you were Jewish and growing up on Long Island. You had to be a doctor or a lawyer because those were the professions that got you more."

In the late 1970s, he enrolled as a Pre-Med Student at Binghamton University in Binghamton, New York. Originally taking biology and chemistry courses, he decided to change paths in his junior year and switched to a double major in psychology and business administration. He received a B.A. from Binghamton in 1982. After graduation, looking towards a career in finance, he enrolled in New York University from which he received an M.B.A.

== Beginning of business career ==
After finding no jobs on Wall Street in Finance, Gaspin looked at an associates program at NBC. After spending five years in the NBC finance department, he shifted to news programming at the urging of Michael Gartner, who was at the time the President of NBC News. After time, he then shifted to entertainment programming. During this tenure, Gaspin helped to develop and launch Dateline NBC as well as expanding The Today Show to its current seven-day schedule. In 1996, Gaspin left NBC to go to head program development at VH1. Returning to NBC in 2001, Gaspin was named Executive Vice President of Program Strategy at NBC Entertainment where he helped to develop new programs such as The Apprentice and Biggest Loser. In 2002, NBC acquired the Bravo Network and Gaspin was named its new president. Some of his most noteworthy accomplishments were the massive hits Queer Eye for the Straight Guy and Project Runway. He was named President of NBC Universal Cable and Digital Content in 2007. Gaspin was a key executive in the creation of HULU and NBCUniversal's push into the direct to consumer business.

== Current career ==
In July 2009, Gaspin was promoted to Chairman of NBC Universal Television Entertainment. Some of the businesses he is responsible for are NBC Entertainment (home to hits such as The Office, 30 Rock, and The Tonight Show), cable channels USA Network and Bravo, and NBC Universal Domestic Television Distribution which distributes such shows as The Martha Stewart Show and The Jerry Springer Show.

In 2012, Gaspin founded Gaspin Media, a production and consulting company, where he is now president. He serves as Executive Producer for several series including Rhythm + Flow for Netflix, First Ladies for Showtime, and To Tell the Truth for ABC. Gaspin has served as a consultant for Discovery, Inc., A$E Networks, and Clear Channel.

In 2013, Gaspin founded TAPP TV, a subscription-based online TV network, along with Jon Klein, former president of CNN US.

Gaspin acts as a media advisor to Towerbrook Capital Partners, where he has done extensive due diligence on efforts to acquire media companies. He sits on the advisory board of KAST and Taboola. Gaspin was also part of the advisory board of Layer3, which sold to T-mobile in 2018.

== Personal life ==
He formerly resided in Hidden Hills, California with his wife, Karen, and children Max, Ben, and Samantha.

Preceded by Ben Silverman	Chairman of NBC Entertainment; 2009-2010	Succeeded by Robert Greenblatt
