= Don Harrison =

American journalist (1936–1998)

Don Harrison (August 8, 1936 – May 2, 1998) was an anchor on CNN Headline News from 1982 until his death from renal cancer in 1998. He was a member of the original team of anchors when Headline News went on the air for the first time as "CNN2" in 1982.

Harrison, a native of Ottawa, Kansas, graduated from Ottawa High School in 1954 and attended Kansas State Teachers College, now Emporia State University. He spent over three decades in the broadcast business. He began his TV career at WIBW in Topeka after previously doing radio. From 1962 to 1973, he was on the staff of KCMO-TV (now KCTV) in Kansas City. While there, he won an award from the U.S. Department of Housing and Urban Development for a documentary called "This Old House." He anchored WBAL-TV's Action News in Baltimore in the early 1970s. He was the lead anchor at Tampa's WTSP from 1979 to 1982. For another four years, he worked for KMSP in Minneapolis-St. Paul.

Harrison was also performed voice-over work, mostly for Turner properties, including TBS, Turner Sports, and CNN International. In 1987, Harrison won the CableACE award for best news anchor. On January 10, 1992, Harrison came seconds away from reporting false reports of the death of George H. W. Bush after he vomited on the Japanese Prime Minister before an off-screen staff member intervened and shouted, "No! Stop!" The tip had been given by a man in Idaho who had claimed to be Bush's physician. Harrison later said, "In my heart, I knew it wasn't accurate...I just knew that reading it was wrong."

In 1992, Harrison auditioned for a lead anchor position for WTSP, the position he had previously held.

Harrison lost his left leg due to bone cancer at age 13 and a kidney, also because of cancer, in 1993. At the time of his death, he was married to his wife Carolyn and had two sons and a daughter. A previous marriage to his wife, Marilyn, ended when she died from leukemia on May 24, 1976, aged 31.
