= KBIA =

Coordinates: 38.888°N 92.264°W

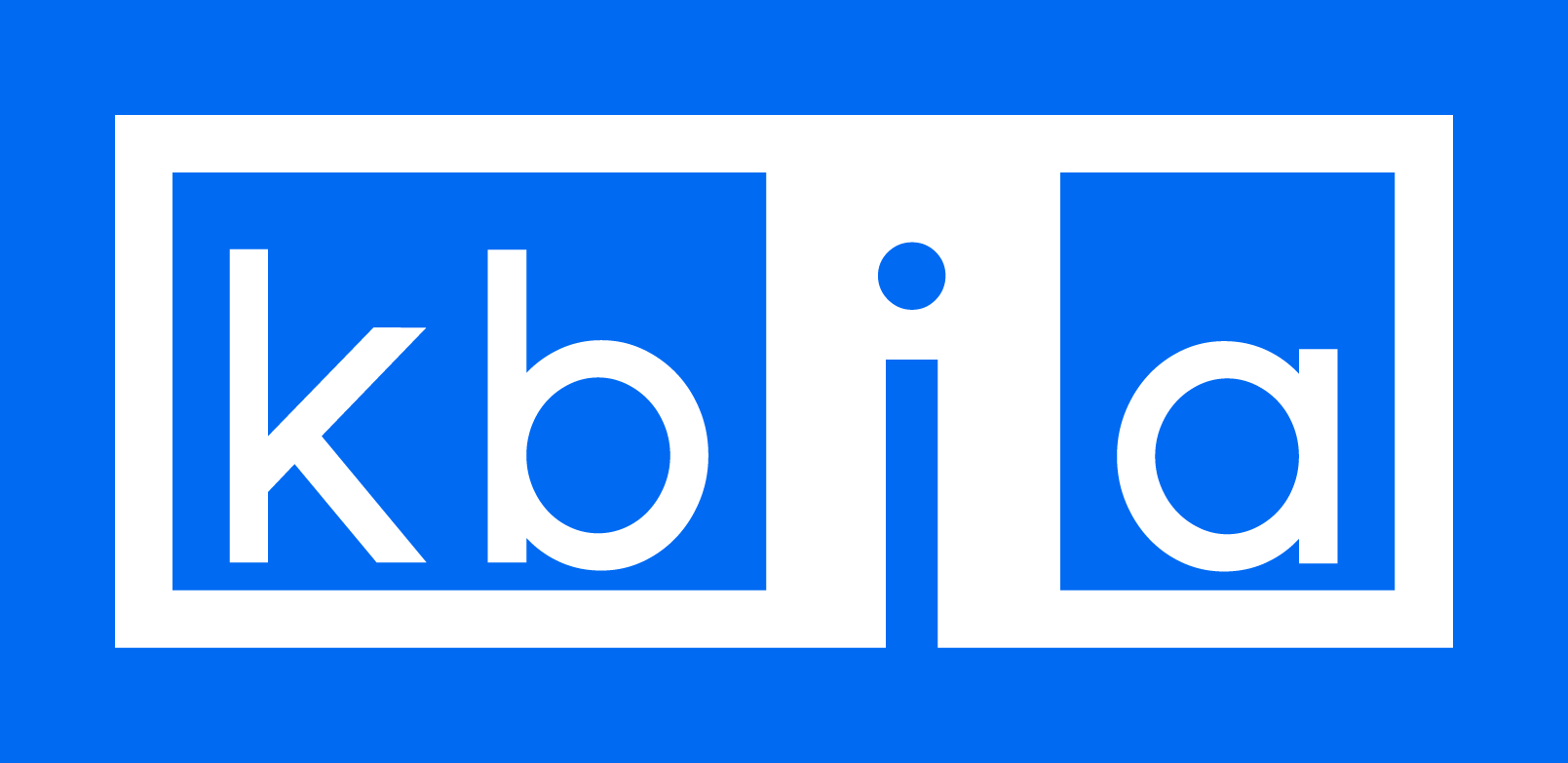
- Columbia, Missouri; United States
- Broadcast area: Central Missouri
- Frequency: 91.3 MHz (HD Radio)
- Branding: KBIA 91.3

Programming
- Format: Public radio
- Subchannels: HD1: KBIA analog; HD2: Classical music (KMUC simulcast); HD3: AAA "Xponential Radio"
- Affiliations: National Public Radio

Ownership
- Owner: University of Missouri; (The Curators of the University of Missouri)
- Sister stations: KMUC, KOMU-TV

History
- First air date: May 1, 1972
- Call sign meaning: "Columbia"

Technical information
- Licensing authority: FCC
- Facility ID: 69180
- Class: C1
- ERP: 100,000 watts
- HAAT: 186 meters (610 ft)
- Repeaters: 89.7 KKTR (Kirksville); 90.5 KAUD (Mexico)

Links
- Public license information: Public file; LMS
- Webcast: Listen live
- Website: kbia.org

KBIA (91.3 FM), is a National Public Radio-member station in Columbia, Missouri. It carries regional news coverage, locally produced news shows, original talk shows, as well as NPR news programs including All Things Considered and Morning Edition. KBIA has an effective radiated power (ERP) of 100,000 watts, the maximum for most stations in the U.S.

The station is owned by the University of Missouri, and operates its own independent newsroom. The stations hosts Broadcast and Radio students from the Missouri School of Journalism. KBIA also operates satellite stations KKTR 89.7 in Kirksville (owned by Truman State University), and KAUD 90.5 in Mexico, Missouri.

KBIA also broadcasts three HD Radio services: KBIA2, which airs classical music (that is simulcast on KMUC); and KBIA3, which airs an AAA format and carries normal KBIA programming when the main service airs special coverage.

== History ==
KBIA signed on May 1, 1972, from room 11 of Jesse Hall at the University of Missouri. Its transmitter is co-located with KOMU-TV.

In November 2014, KBIA announced it would purchase KWWC-FM (90.5) from neighboring Stephens College. The sale completed, and the classical music format that used to be heard weekdays on KBIA has moved to KMUC. KBIA transitioned into a news/talk/information station similar to sister stations KCUR-FM Kansas City and KWMU St. Louis.

In 2021, KBIA moved their newsroom to Lee Hills Hall to be co-located with the Columbia Missourian, Vox, and Missouri Business Alert.

In 2022, KBIA and KOMU-TV moved to a new tower and the old tower nearby was dismantled.
