= Lou Waters =

American news anchor

- Born: July 7, 1938 (age 87); Minneapolis, Minnesota, U.S.
- Education: University of Minnesota (School of Architecture)
- Occupation: Television journalist

Lou Waters (born July 7, 1938) is an American retired television journalist. He was one of the original anchors of CNN, an American cable news channel when it first aired in the summer of 1980 and remained one of the network's primary anchors until September 2001, adding to a journalism career spanning nearly 40 years. For much of his tenure with the network, Waters anchored CNN Today with Natalie Allen. Additionally, he co-anchored Early Prime and hosted special editions, including Coming of Age, a series on aging in American society. Waters spoke to expert scientists and people of all ages about their views on aging for this series.

== Biography ==
Waters was born in Minneapolis, Minnesota, and attended the University of Minnesota School of Architecture. Before joining CNN, Waters was a disc jockey and newscaster in Minneapolis, St. Paul, Tucson, San Diego, San Francisco, Los Angeles, Buffalo and New York City. After his career at CNN, Waters became managing editor and host of NewsProNet's "Investing in America" consumer money reports, seen on more than 80 television stations across the U.S. Waters was, until recently, the Vice Mayor of Oro Valley, Arizona. Waters recently turned to writing after authoring a book about San Francisco radio legend Bobby Dale. The book, titled Have I Got a Song for You, chronicled the life of Dale.
