= Judy Fortin =

Judy Fortin (born 1961) is executive director of communications for UCLA Health in Los Angeles, California. Previously, she served as senior director of communications from 2013 to 2019 for Winship Cancer Institute of Emory University in Atlanta, Georgia. From 2011–2013, she was national director of media relations for the American Cancer Society.

== Early life and education ==
Fortin was born on October 7, 1961, in Hanover, New Hampshire. After graduating from Concord High School, she attended Bowdoin College in Brunswick, Maine. She earned a Bachelor of Arts degree in government and French in 1983.

== Career ==
Fortin began her broadcast career in Plymouth, New Hampshire, where she started out as an announcer and then news director at WPNH AM/FM Radio. From January 1986 until June 1989, she was a weekend anchor and general assignment reporter for WMUR-TV in Manchester. Prior to joining CNN, Fortin worked as a general assignment reporter for WCVB-TV in Boston.

From 1990 to 2006, she anchored CNN Headline News. She also served as a national correspondent for CNN Newsource, a news service used by local affiliate stations. In 2006, Fortin became a correspondent for the award-winning CNN Medical Unit. Fortin received an Excellence in Media Award in 2009 from the National Marrow Donor Program and in 2008, a MORE Award for reporting excellence from the American Academy of Orthopaedic Surgeons. She is the recipient of a national Emmy Award for CNN group coverage of the Oklahoma City bombing in 1995.
