= Sophia Choi =

American news broadcaster

- Born: March 5, 1971 (age 55); Daegu, South Korea
- Education: University of Missouri
- Occupations: News anchor, reporter
- Employer(s): KOMU-TV; WSET-TV; WVTM-TV; KCBS-TV; CNN Headline News; KVBC (2007–2010); WSB-TV

Sophia Choi (born March 5, 1971) is an American news broadcaster at WSB-TV in Atlanta, Georgia.

== Biography ==
Sophia Choi was born in Daegu, Korea. She moved to the U.S. at the age of seven, and attended Hollywood Elementary School in Hollywood, Maryland. After her father's death when she was 12, she moved to Memphis, Tennessee, where she attended Briarcrest Baptist High School. She attended the University of Missouri in Columbia, Missouri, and graduated with a bachelor's degree in journalism. During her college years, she worked at the university's television station KOMU-TV, the NBC affiliate in Columbia, Missouri. She also worked at the university's radio station, KBIA.

== Professional career ==
Sophia Choi started her professional career at WSET-TV, the ABC affiliate in Lynchburg, Virginia, as a general assignment reporter. She next worked at WVTM-TV, the NBC affiliate in Birmingham, Alabama where she worked her way up from a general assignment reporter to the weekend morning anchor. While at WVTM-TV, Choi was nominated for an Emmy Award for her special report called "Dirty Downloading."

Choi then worked at KCBS-TV, the CBS owned-and-operated station in Los Angeles. She started as a general assignment reporter and fill-in anchor, but was promoted and became the weekday morning anchor. In 2001, Choi moved to Atlanta, Georgia, to become a prime time anchor for CNN Headline News. During her tenure at CNN Headline News, Choi anchored various newscasts on CNN Headline News, CNN and CNN International. She also covered various breaking news stories including the aftermath of Hurricane Katrina, Hurricane Wilma and the wars in Iraq and Afghanistan.

In 2006, Choi left CNN Headline News. She then traveled to Shanghai, China with the University of Missouri School of Journalism on a speaking tour. In 2007, Choi joined KVBC-TV (now KSNV), the NBC affiliate in Las Vegas. She co-anchored First News 3 at Four and News 3 at Six with Kendall Tenney until the end of 2009. In 2010, Choi began anchoring First News 3 at Four with Jeff Gillan and News 3 at Six with Jim Snyder. She also reported on crime trends in the Las Vegas Valley, through the Crime Tracker 3 franchise.

On May 28, 2010, Choi was notified by KVBC that her contract would not be renewed. With six months left on her contract, it effectively prohibited her from working at another Las Vegas-market TV station for 18 months.

Sophia Choi returned to Atlanta and joined ABC affiliate WSB-TV on July 8, 2011, with a report on Channel 2 Action News at 4. Effective January 1, 2013, she will be anchoring the weekend morning editions of Channel 2 Action News and reporting during weekdays.

== Movies & TV Shows ==
Choi has appeared as herself and a newscaster in several TV shows and movies. They include: Primary Colors, The Torturer, and Special Unit 2. In 2003, Choi was chosen as one of seven Korean American "heroes" to serve as a marshal in the Tournament of Roses Parade.

Choi was also named as the "Most Poised News Anchor" in a list of "100 favorite Asian American People, Places and Things."
