= Linda Stouffer =

American television news correspondent (born 1970)

- Born: Cinnamon Linda Stouffer; August 5, 1970 (age 56); San Marcos, Texas
- Education: San Marcos High School (1988)
- Alma mater: University of the Incarnate Word (1992)
- Occupation: Journalist
- Years active: 1992–present
- Employer(s): WSB-TV, Atlanta, Georgia
- Spouse: Mark G. Strassmann (m. 1995)
- Children: 2

Cinnamon Linda Stouffer (born August 5, 1970) is an American television news correspondent. She currently co-anchors the early morning news broadcasts on WSB-TV 2, Atlanta, Georgia.

== Background ==
Born in San Marcos, Texas, Stouffer attended the public school system, graduating from San Marcos High School in 1988. She was Texas' Junior Miss when she was a high school senior and participated in the America's Junior Miss Scholarship Program in 1988. Stouffer then attended the University of the Incarnate Word in San Antonio, Texas, on a Phi Beta Kappa scholarship. She graduated with a bachelor's degree in communication, magna cum laude in 1992.

== Professional career ==
After college, Stouffer (working under the name Cinnamon Stouffer) was hired as a general assignment reporter at KMOL-TV in San Antonio in 1992, eventually being promoted to an anchor. In 1994 she moved to Miami, Florida, working as a general assignment reporter and weekend anchor for WSVN-TV. She moved to Atlanta, Georgia in 1997, joining Cable News Network (CNN), where she changed her professional name to Linda Stouffer.

At CNN, she co-anchored the morning news program Ahead of the Curve, which aired simultaneously on CNN/U.S. and CNNfn, CNN's former financial news network. She also was a weekday and later a weekend anchor for CNN Headline News. Stouffer was among several laid off in December 2008, her last day at CNN being December 14, 2008.

She then began working local news on WSB-TV Atlanta. She anchored the 6 p.m. news and the Action News Nightbeat on Sundays. She also filed stories for the News at 5 and 6 p.m. during the week. On January 7, 2013, she became a weekday early morning co-anchor on the 4:30 a.m. newscast.
