= Jim Walton (journalist) =

Former President of CNN

Jim Walton (born 1958) is the former president of CNN Worldwide. He joined CNN in 1981, one year after the network was founded.

He graduated from the University of Maryland, College Park in 1981. He started his career at CNN as a VJ, an entry-level position. He has two sons, Jake and Max.

He took over as the president of CNN Worldwide in 2003. On July 27, 2012, Walton announced he was quitting at CNN after working there for over 30 years. He remained with the network until the end of the year after which he was replaced by Jeff Zucker, former NBCUniversal president.
