= Gabriela Frías =

Mexican journalist

Gabriela Alejandra Frías (born 8 March 1971) is a Mexican journalist who is a business anchor for CNN en Español and host of En Efectivo, the network's personal finance show.

Frías studied in the Carlos Septién School of Journalism in Mexico City where she graduated with honors. She was assistant director of the Department of External Relations of the American Chamber of Commerce of Mexico City for more than two years until she joined the Reforma newspaper. In 1998, she became a presenter and reporter for Negocios México, a joint project between Reforma and CNN en Español.

Frías became a full member of CNN en Español at the beginning of 2000 as the producer of the program Economía y Finanzas (Economics and Finance) where she also served as host. At CNN, Frías, responsible for the creation of the business daily news show, was in charge of the selection of the guests and the content of the show. She also participated in the writing of the news and the edition as well as anchoring the show.

Since 2002, she has been the presenter and producer of En Efectivo, a matinée program about personal finances which provides viewers with economic and financial information. The idea behind the show is to offer economic and financial information in a way that can be easily understood by the audience, without technicalities. There are sections dedicated to personal investments, new enterprises, tourism, education and personal technology. Every day, Frías interviews a different guest that deepens one particular topic.

On 7 August 2007, Frías was a part of the group of 95 students who graduated from the High Management Programme of the INCAE University in Costa Rica. The goal of the programme is to prepare students to assume high responsibilities in the private and the public sector.

== Personal life ==
Gabriela Frias has a daughter, born in 2019.

== En Efectivo ==
En efectivo is a programme about managing money and assets in a safe and effective way. The aim was to make the viewer think about their future and to find a better way of investing their savings to guarantee a decent retirement.

== See also ==
- Ana Navarro
- Anderson Cooper
- Andrés Oppenheimer
- Arianna Huffington
- Carlos Alberto Montaner
- Carlos Montero
- Carmen Aristegui
- Christiane Amanpour
- Fareed Zakaria
- Fernando del Rincón
- Geovanny Vicente
- Patricia Janiot
- Pedro Bordaberry
- Sylvia Garcia
- CNN en Español
