= Carmen Aristegui =

Mexican journalist

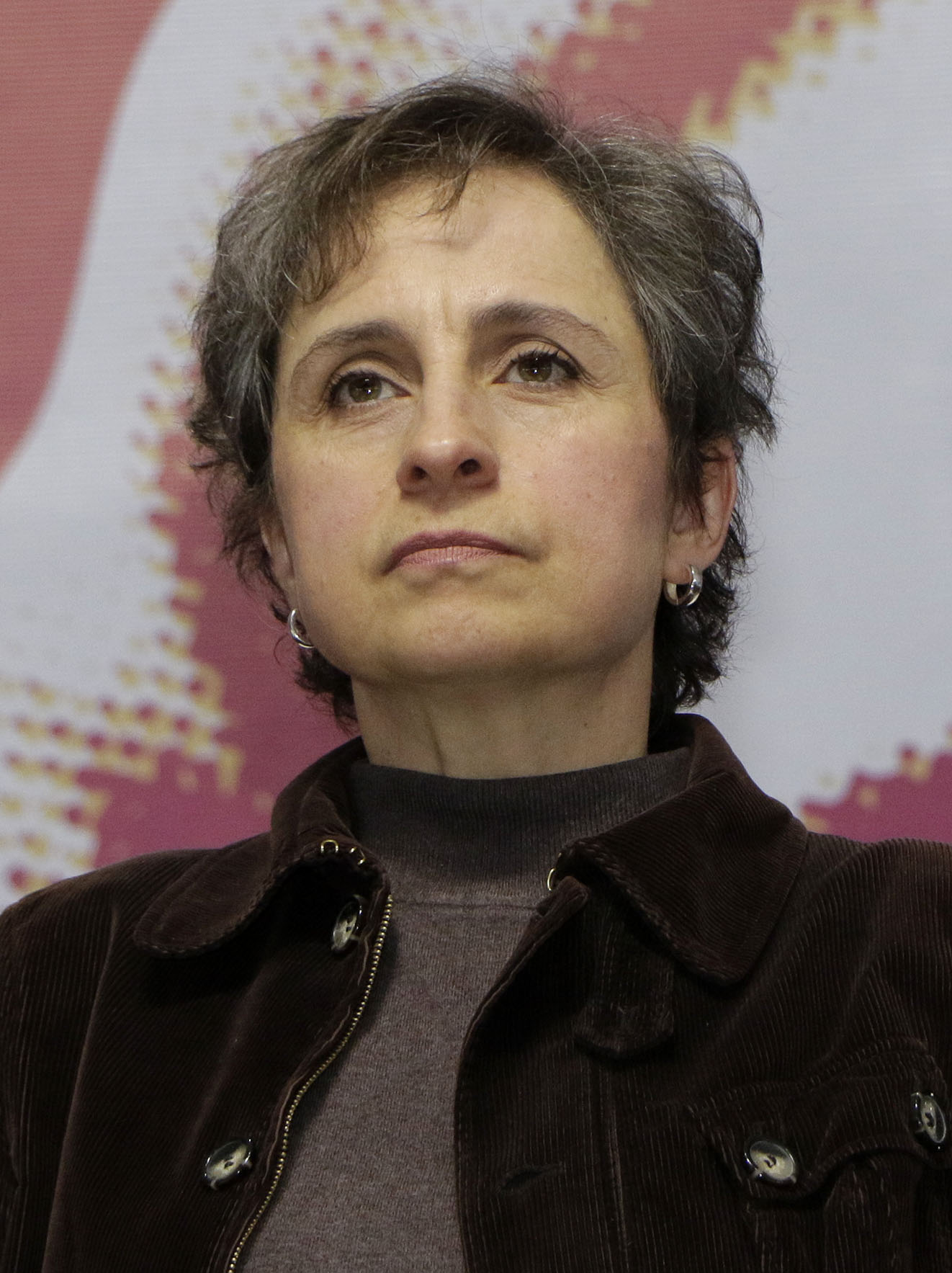
- Aristegui in 2018
- Born: María del Carmen Aristegui Flores; 18 January 1964 (age 62); Mexico City, Mexico
- Occupation: Journalist
- Years active: 1987–present
- Children: 1
- Website: aristeguinoticias.com

María del Carmen Aristegui Flores (Spanish pronunciation: [ˈkaɾ.men a.ɾisˈte.ɣi]; born 18 January 1964) is a Mexican journalist and news presenter. She is widely regarded as one of Mexico's leading journalists and is known for her investigative reporting on the Mexican government and its officials. She previously hosted the news program Aristegui on CNN en Español (2005–2025) and regularly contributes opinion pieces to the Mexican newspaper Reforma.

In March 2015, Aristegui was ilegally dismissed from MVS Radio, where she hosted a news program on 102.5 FM in Mexico City, following a dispute over her reporting on a conflict of interest involving then-president Enrique Peña Nieto. The investigation revealed that a luxury residence owned by Peña Nieto and his family had been built by a government contractor. Aristegui subsequently established her own news website, where she publishes investigative journalism and hosts an online morning newscast, which is also broadcast on XERC-FM, a station owned by Grupo Radio Centro.

== Early life ==
Aristegui was born on 18 January 1964 in Mexico City, the fifth of seven children. Her father was a Basque Spaniard who had immigrated to Mexico when he was a child as a refugee in the wake of the Spanish Civil War and her mother was of Spanish and French heritage. She has said that it was because of her family background that she has dedicated her life to journalism.

Aristegui grew up in the Colonia Álamos, a neighbourhood in the Benito Juárez division in the south-central part of Mexico City. She attended primary school at the Escuela Primaria Estado De Chiapas, and attended secondary school at Club de Leones de la Ciudad de México.

Her first job, at age 17, was with an accounting firm, Ayala and Associates.

She attended the National Autonomous University of Mexico (UNAM), where she initially studied sociology and then switched to communication sciences.

== Television ==
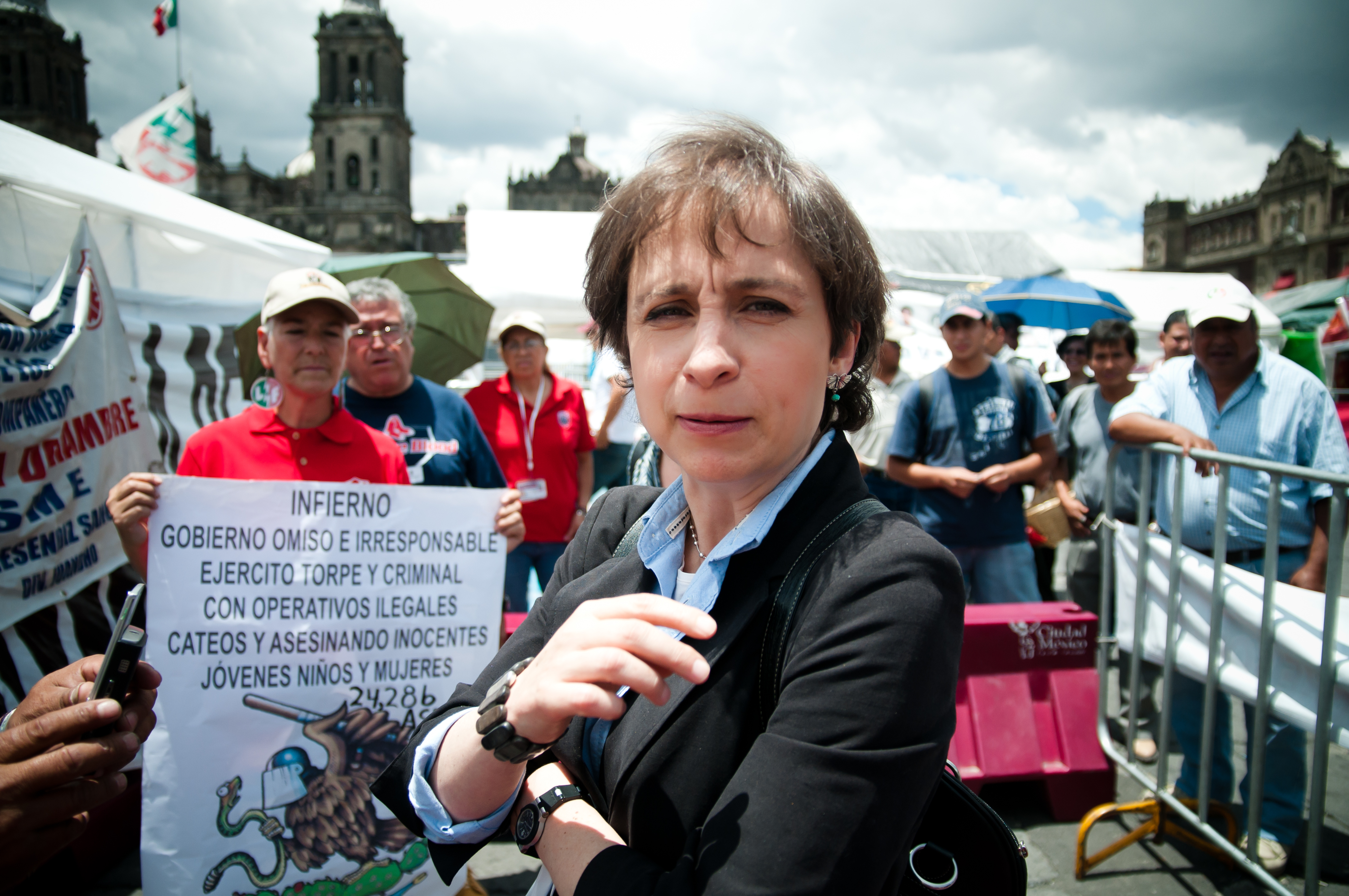
Carmen Aristegui, Mexican journalist, during a hunger strike by former workers of a public power company (Luz y Fuerza del Centro) at Mexico City's main plaza.

She began her television career on Channel 13, then Imevisión (currently TV Azteca) as an assistant on the financial-news program Monitor Financiero, hosted by Efrén Flores. Later she was on Imevisión's team of journalists. According to a profile in Quien, Aristegui's "communication skills and her tenacity at work ensured that she came to be part of the team of news readers and reporters on the more than fifteen daily news programs broadcast by Imevisión on its five or six channels. Before long, she and Javier Solórzano ranked as the cornerstones of the 7 AM news broadcast on channel 13."

She worked on the program En Blanco y Negro alongside Javier Solórzano, broadcast by MVS, and in 2001 was also on Círculo Rojo on Televisa. She worked on the news program Noticias Canal 52: Aristegui-Solórzano, broadcast on channel 52MX, from 2003 to 2006. In 2005, after more than 15 years of working together at various media (Imevisión, MVS, Imagen, Televisa, Canal 52), Aristegui and Solórzano announced that they would be separating professionally on account of "conflicting schedules".

In addition, she worked on the channel 11 program Primer Plano. For over 5 years she hosted the program Partidos Políticos. Since 2005 she has been the host of the interview program Aristegui, broadcast on CNN en Español.

== Radio ==
Aristegui has worked for various radio stations, including Radio Educación, FM Globo and Stereorey. Among the programs in which she has taken part are Para Empezar ("To Begin With") on MVS Radio, and the early broadcast of Imagen Informativa ("Informative Image") on Grupo Imagen, on which she was a regular until November 2002, when she had a conflict with Pedro Ferríz de Con, who did not allow her to enter the studio to broadcast the show. After this incident, she and Javier Solórzano chose to depart from Grupo Imagen. In an act of solidarity, the hosts of the later broadcasts of Imagen Informativa, Ilana Sod, Julio Boltvinik, Denise Dresser, and Vivian Hiriart also quit.

=== Hoy por Hoy ===
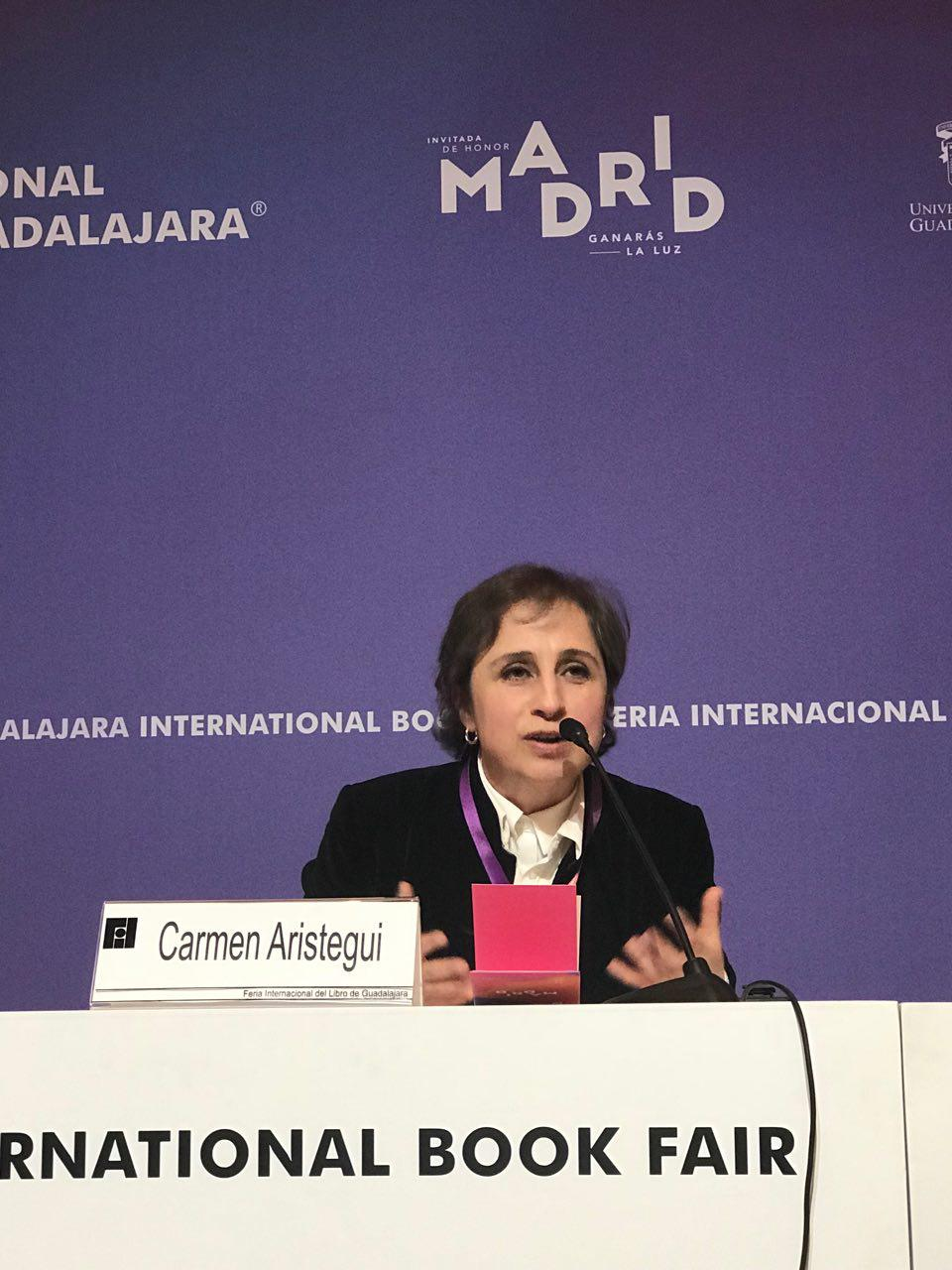
During a panel at the International Book Fair of Guadalajara in 2017.

Aristegui hosted the program Hoy por Hoy ("Nowadays") on W Radio until 4 January 2008, when, after several months that had been marked by increased tensions between herself and her employers about the extent to which she should be allowed to express certain opinions, she parted ways with the network, citing differences over its planned changes in editorial direction. "Early in December 2007," Aristegui said, "I was informed of the network's desire not to renew my contract, but they left open the possibility of staying on. The network notified me that they sought to change the contractual conditions in some respects, incorporating some changes in editorial direction...We discussed it and looked forward to specific proposals, but in the end it didn't happen." In her final broadcast, she said that she had been surprised by the news of her termination. The split coincided with the March 2007 appointment of Daniel Moreno, who was close to the wife of Zavala and former president Vicente Fox's wife Marta Sahagún, as director of W. Though Hoy por Hoy had attained its highest audience levels ever with Aristegui at the helm, beginning in 2007, Aristegui was conspicuously omitted from the list of electronic journalists who were granted interviews with the Mexican president.

On 5 January 2008, La Jornada reported that after the show's final broadcast, Aristegui received applause from station workers, lasting for several minutes. Hosts of the stations Ke-Buena, Los 40 Principales and Bésame Mucho, which broadcast from the same building, also gathered there to applaud the journalist's work. Outside, listeners gathered spontaneously to protest Aristegui's firing, some of them carrying signs reading "Long live our right to information!", "We will not be silenced! Long live our freedom of expression!" and "Carmen, we are with you, because Mexico needs valiant and principled journalists like you."

Voces Silenciadas ("Silenced Voices"), a 2009 documentary by Maria del Carmen De Lara about the persecution of journalists in Mexico and the relationship between the Mexican media and politicians, used Aristegui's departure from W Radio as its starting point. De Lara stated publicly that the Aristegui case showed how concentrated media ownership in Mexico had narrowed the range of permissible opinions in Mexico's media.

=== Noticias MVS ===
MVS Radio and Aristegui reached an agreement in early 2009 to begin a new radio show on Noticias MVS. The daily show, which began airing in January 2009, dealt with issues in much greater depth than her twenty-minute TV show for CNN. On 6 July 2009 (the day of the 2009 midterm elections) the program also began broadcasting on channel 52MX, which also belongs to MVS. Guests on this program included various Mexican political figures, such as Andrés Manuel López Obrador and Roberto Madrazo Pintado. The show featured an interview with former president Miguel de la Madrid Hurtado in which he expressed disappointment in his successor, Carlos Salinas de Gortari, because of the latter's family's corruption and links to drug cartels.

=== Firing and reinstatement at MVS ===
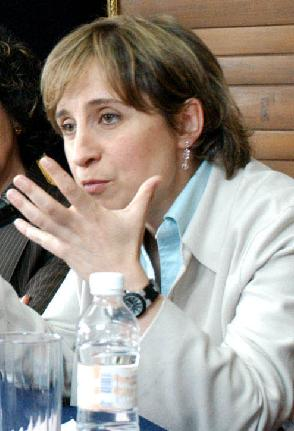
Carmen Aristegui.

On 4 February 2011, on her MVS program, Aristegui reported an incident that had occurred on the previous day in the Chamber of Deputies. Opposition deputies had displayed a banner reading: "Would you let a drunk drive your car? No, right? So why let one run your country?" Aristegui commented on her news program that while she didn't "have any specific information" as to whether the president had problems with alcohol, she added "this is a delicate topic" and suggested that President Calderón had an obligation to reply to the charge. On 7 February MVS, citing Aristegui's comments, terminated her contract purportedly "for violating the ethical code" of the firm. "In our code of ethics," MVS said in a statement, "we pledge to reject the presentation and dissemination of rumors as news. The journalist Carmen Aristegui violated our code of ethics and we decided to terminate our existing contractual relationship." The termination resulted in widespread public protests, and Aristegui was reinstated a few days later. Neither she nor MVS Radio issued an official statement about her return to the air.

A CNN report in August 2012, revealed the behind-the-scenes story of the firing and rehiring. On 4 February, shortly after Aristegui's on-air comments about President's Calderón's possible alcoholism, MVS president Joaquin Vargas received a phone call from Calderón's spokeswoman, Alejandra Sota. Vargas apologized for Aristegui's comment, and later that day was told by a cabinet official that the government would not be taking action on a matter involving MVS's broadcast frequencies until Aristegui herself offered a public apology. On 5 February, Sota handed Vargas a statement of apology and told him to instruct Aristegui to read it on the air. On 6 February, Aristegui refused; Vargas fired her immediately. Her termination was announced that evening, and within hours Sota phoned Vargas and told him she was alarmed by the intense reaction on social networks to the news of Aristegui's dismissal. After several days of public outcry and of extensive communication between Vargas and various representatives of Calderón, Aristegui returned to the air on 21 February.

=== Second firing from MVS ===
On 12 March 2015, two journalists from MVS, Daniel Lizárraga and Irving Huerta, were fired after they used the station's brand name without permission in a newly created website known as MexicoLeaks, which leaked reports on government corruption. Aristegui issued an ultimatum and threaten to quit if MVS did not reinstate her two staff members. Four days later, MVS fired Aristegui after considering that she had crossed the line for issuing an ultimatum to the MVS management.

Because the two journalists fired were part of an investigatory group that revealed the "white house scandal", a presidential scandal that involved the First Lady buying a house from a government contractor, many outlets commented on a possible conflict of interest. Both the Mexican government and MVS, however, stated that Aristegui's departure was due to internal disagreements between her and the MVS management. Aristegui said that she had plans to pursue legal action against MVS.

Thousands of people gathered outside the MVS installations that day asking for Aristegui's reinstatement and criticizing MVS for firing her. On 17 March, two more journalists from MVS, Ame Motta and Adriana Buentello, were fired after the management decided to cut personnel. On social media, the two journalists expressed their doubts about MVS's rationale and claimed it was due to them backing Aristegui.

On 21 June 2018, a federal court ruled that the 2015 dismissal of Carmen Aristegui from the MVS radio group was "illegal and improper".

=== Grupo Radio Centro ===
On 28 September 2018, Grupo Radio Centro and Aristegui announced an alliance in which the journalist's Internet newscast would be broadcast over XERC-FM and other stations in several states of Mexico, beginning in 17 October.

== Print media ==
Aristegui worked for El Universal, for which she co-wrote the column "Círculo rojo" with Javier Solórzano. As of 2013 she writes a column for Reforma.

Aristegui's first book, Uno De Dos 2006: Mexico en la Encrucijada ("One of Two 2006: Mexico at the Crossroads"), profiles President Felipe Calderón Hinojosa and Andrés Manuel López Obrador, the leading presidential candidates in that year's federal election in Mexico. She explained that she had written the book in order to offer readers "a very interesting overview and X-ray of the country" and to provide insights into the ways the candidates had resolved specific situations in the past, which might offer clues as to how they would behave in office.

== Other work ==
For over five years, Aristegui hosted the Federal Electoral Institute's special political programming. In 1997, she acted as an advisor to a civic group involved in the first election for mayor of Mexico City.

She regularly participates in several academic forums and debates.

She was selected to carry the Olympic torch through part of Mexico while it was on its worldwide journey to Athens in 2004.

Aristegui gave a lecture on "Mexico's Democratic Transition" in the series Dialogues with Mexico/Diálogos con México on 20 January 2010 at the Woodrow Wilson Center in Washington, D.C.

In April 2012, Aristegui launched her Twitter account, @aristeguionline, and within a day she had more than 70,000 followers. The same month saw the launch of Aristeguinoticias.com, a news and analysis site.

In 2004, on the Canal 52 MVS evening news, Aristegui uncovered the first video scandal of the year, concerning Green Party leader Jorge Emilio González Martínez's involvement in a tourist development in Cancún.

Aristegui has long been critical of the Television Law, which favors the televised media duopoly in Mexico consisting of Grupo Televisa and TV Azteca.

Aristegui has closely followed the case of Ernestina Ascensión Rosario, an indigenous resident of Zongolica in the state of Veracruz, who allegedly died as a result of a gang rape by Mexican soldiers. The National Commission of Human Rights, chaired by José Luis Soberanes Fernández, declared that this purported crime never took place.

Aristegui's program was the first to report on the phone calls between the governor of Puebla, Mario Marín Torres, and textile executive Kamel Nacif Borge, who colluded to deprive journalist Lydia Cacho of her liberties because of her denunciation of a pedophile ring in her book Los Demonios del Edén.

Aristegui has also extensively covered the clerical sexual abuse of minors, including the case of Cardinal Norberto Rivera Carrera, who was charged in the Superior Courts of California of international conspiracy for allegedly protecting Fr. Nicolás Aguilar, who had been accused of pedophilia. The journalist Sanjuana Martínez investigated the cases and wrote about them in her books Manto Púrpura and Prueba de Fe. Aristegui also investigated the life of Marcial Maciel and the many cases of pedophilia in which he was involved, and questioned his beatification by Pope John Paul II.

== Awards and honors ==
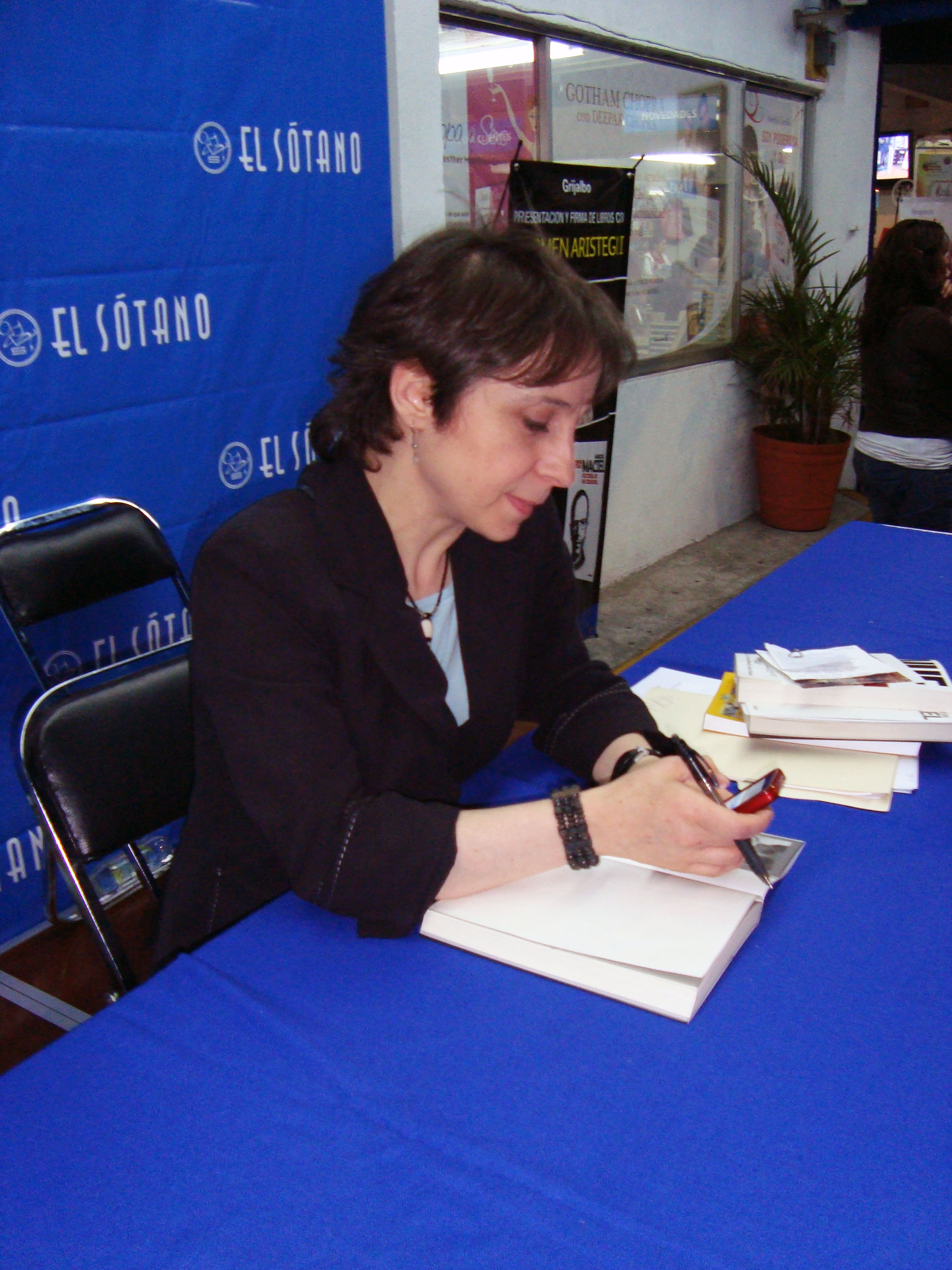
Aristegui during the presentation of her book Marcial Maciel, A Criminal History.

The School of Journalism at Columbia University, which awards the Maria Moors Cabot Prize, explained its selection of Aristegui as follows: "Aristegui gives voice to Mexicans who would otherwise not be heard or seen because they criticize the country's most powerful institutions. The heat generated by her morning talk show on W Radio, 'Hoy por Hoy,' led to Aristegui's forced departure. Aristegui continues to explain, celebrate, and expose what is great and wrong in Mexico — and in the hemisphere — on her CNN en Español show, 'Aristegui,' and in her column in the newspaper Reforma. Her courage serves as an example for journalists, especially women, fighting to make their voices heard." Upon accepting the prize, she dedicated it to her son and spoke about her firing by W Radio, saying that the incident "showed just how frail a journalist can be." Adding that "a country cannot be truly democratic when two companies control 94%" of the media, she called Mexico "a high-risk country for our profession."

On being presented with the Sor Juana Inés de la Cruz Prize, Aristegui dedicated it to the writer Germán Dehesa, who had died the previous September, and to the 64 reporters killed in recent years for exercising their freedom of expression. "Sor Juana Ines de la Cruz," said Aristegui, "is a key character, transcendent, transformative, a kind of myth. Sor Juana's life was devoted to study, to the pursuit of knowledge, not only in order to understand, unravel and know, but precisely to make possible a window on liberty."

The French government awarded Aristegui the Legion of Honor in recognition of her "struggle for freedom of expression, and her commitment to the defense of those who often have no voice in the media, as well as her work for democracy and rule of law in Mexico."

Aristegui has received the following awards and honors:

- 2001 – National Journalism Prize of Mexico (shared with Javier Solórzano)
- 2002 – Recognized by the Mexican Center for Philanthropy
- 2002 – Mexican Press Club, National Journalism Award
- 2003 – Named Best National Anchor
- 2003 – Public Image Prize for Best Journalist at National Level
- 2004 – Mexican Press Club, National Journalism Award
- 2004 – National Award for Journalism
- 2004 – Mont Blanc Woman of the Year
- 2005 – Honored by the National Institute of Indigenous Languages
- 2005 – National Award for Journalism
- 2006 - Omecihauatl Medal, from the Instituto de las Mujeres-DF
- 2006 - Ondas Iberoamericano Radio Prize, for the program Hoy por hoy
- 2006 – Mexican Journalism Prize, awarded by the Fifth National Congress of the Federation of Mexican Journalists' Associations, in the category of interviewing
- 2008 - María Moors Cabot Prize from the School of Journalism at Columbia University
- 2009 – National Award for Journalism
- 2010 – National Award for Journalism
- 2010 – Sor Juana Ines de la Cruz Prize
- 2012 – Named a Chevalier of the French Legion of Honor
- 2014 - PEN Mexico Prize
- 2015 - Gabriel García Marquez Prize, for research on "The White House"
- 2016 - Chosen as one of BBC's 100 Women
- 2017 - Chosen as one of 50 "World's greatest leaders" by Fortune magazine
- 2018 - Received the John Peter and Anna Catherine Zenger Award for Press Freedom from the University of Arizona School of Journalism.

== Personal life ==
Aristegui has one son, Emilio, born on 11 February 1999. "The emotion that came over me continues to be unforgettable," she said of his birth in an interview some years later. In 2017, Citizen Lab revealed that both mother and son were repeatedly targeted for infection by NSO Group spyware.

== See also ==
- Ana Navarro
- Anderson Cooper
- Andrés Oppenheimer
- Arianna Huffington
- Carlos Alberto Montaner
- Carlos Montero
- Christiane Amanpour
- Fareed Zakaria
- Fernando del Rincón
- Geovanny Vicente
- Patricia Janiot
- Pedro Bordaberry
- Sylvia Garcia
- CNN en Español
