= Patricia Janiot =

Colombian-American journalist, news anchor, former beauty queen and model

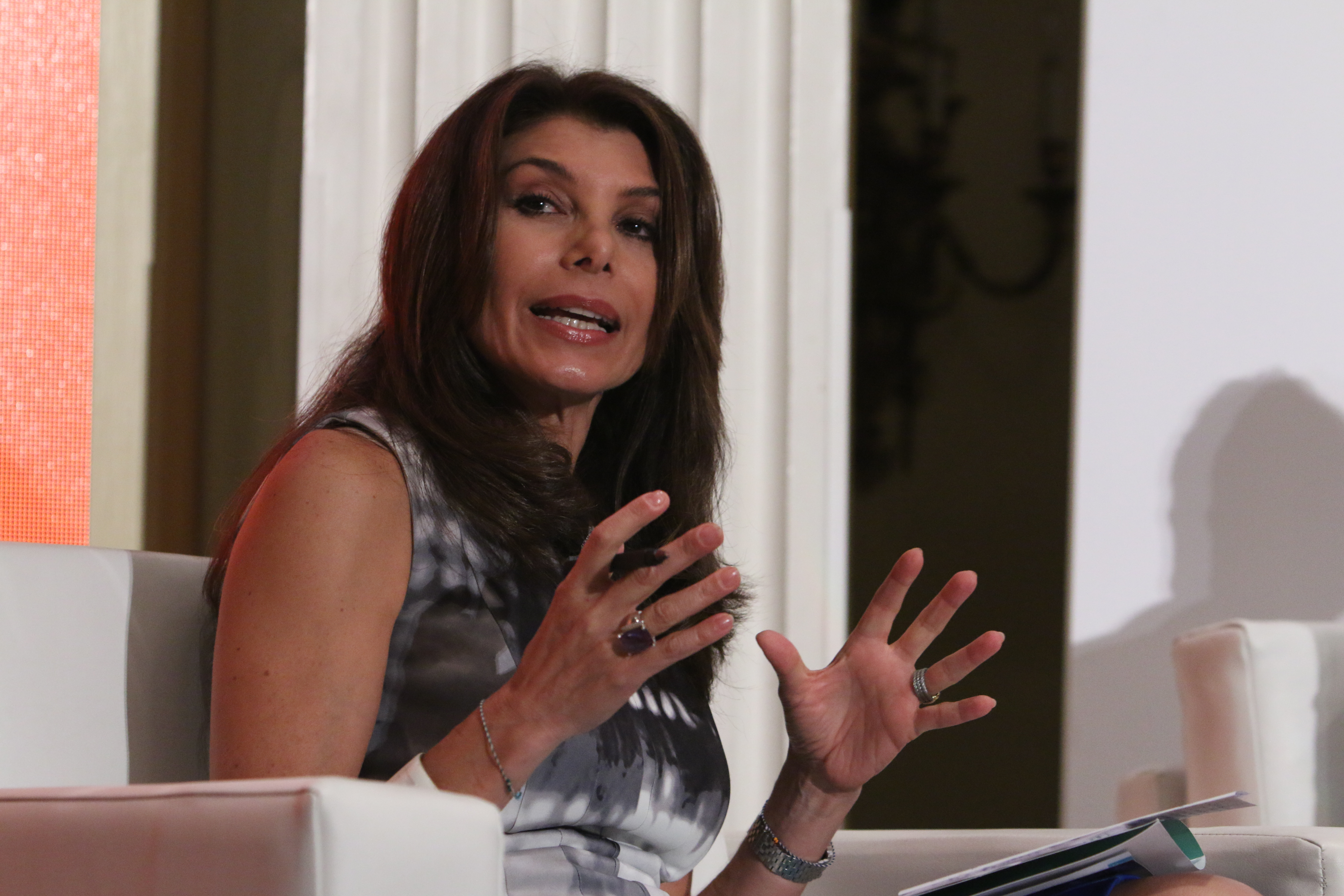
- Born: Ángela Patricia Janiot Martirena; October 2, 1963 (age 62); Bucaramanga, Santander, Colombia
- Education: Universidad de la Sabana
- Occupation: Television journalist
- Years active: 1992 – present
- Spouse: (Argentina) Miguel Yelós San Martín
- Children: Tábatha Paulina Yelós; Tadeo Santiago Yelós

Ángela Patricia Janiot Martirena (born October 2, 1963) is a Colombian-American journalist, news anchor, model and beauty pageant titleholder. She worked for 25 years at CNN en Español as the senior news anchor where she established her career as a reputable figure in Latin American news. She worked recently as a News Anchor and Senior Correspondent at Noticias Univision.

== Miss World ==
Before becoming a journalist, Janiot was a Colombian model, then she participated as Miss Santander in the Miss Colombia pageant in 1983, where she won the title of Miss Mundo Colombia and was sent to Miss World 1984 pageant. She travelled to London and participated at the pageant, there she placed in the Top 15 semifinalists.

== CNN Internacional ==
After her participation as a beauty pageant titleholder she graduated with a degree in journalism at Universidad de la Sabana in Bogotá. She joined CNN in 1992, where she hosted the Noticiero Telemundo CNN After the association with Telemundo she stayed with CNN and anchored CNN Internacional. Since CNN en Español was founded in 1997, she became its main news anchor.

== Awards ==
She has received several journalism awards, such as the Golden Mike Award in 1990 and the Simón Bolívar Journalism Award in Colombia. She has also been nominated and awarded the Emmy Award.

== Personal life and charitable work ==
Janiot was born in 1963 in Bucaramanga, Santander Department to Roberto Pablo Janiot (an Argentine of French descent), a former football player who played for the Atlético Bucaramanga for some years, and his wife Zunilda Elvizzi Martirena also Argentine of Italian descent. She is married to Miguel Yelós San Martín, from Argentina, with whom she has two children, Tábatha and Tadeo, and currently lives in Miami, Florida. Janiot is president of the Colombianitos foundation, which helps children who are victims of the Colombian armed conflict.

== See also ==
- Ana Navarro
- Anderson Cooper
- Andrés Oppenheimer
- Arianna Huffington
- Carlos Alberto Montaner
- Carlos Montero
- Christiane Amanpour
- Fareed Zakaria
- Fernando del Rincón
- Geovanny Vicente
- Pedro Bordaberry
- Sylvia Garcia
- CNN en Español
