= Carlos Alberto Montaner =

Cuban author and journalist (1943–2023)

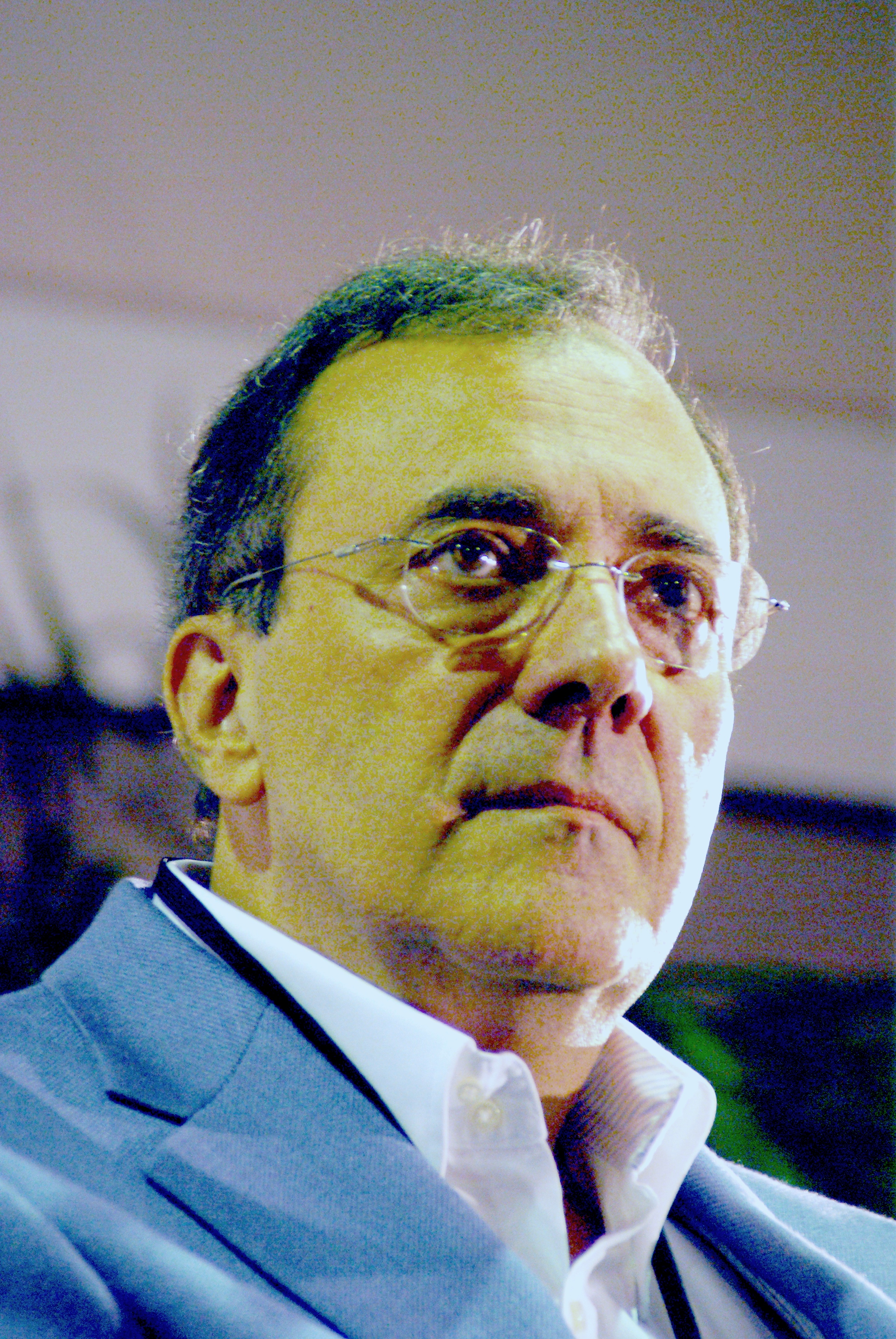
- Montaner in 2011
- Born: 3 April 1943; Havana, Cuba
- Died: 29 June 2023 (aged 80); Madrid, Spain
- Citizenship: Spanish
- Occupations: Writer, journalist

Carlos Alberto Montaner Suris (3 April 1943 – 29 June 2023) was an exiled Cuban author and journalist known for his criticism of Fidel Castro and the Cuban government. He was published widely in Latin American newspapers, and produced fiction and non-fiction books about Latin America. Montaner was a political analyst for CNN en Español.

== Background ==
Montaner was born in 1943 in Havana, Cuba. After the Cuban Revolution of 1959, Montaner, along with others identified then as counter-revolutionaries, was imprisoned by the Cuban government on charges of participating in terrorist attacks and of working with the CIA. Soon after his arrest, he managed to escape from prison and fled Cuba permanently. In 1970 he relocated to Spain from the United States. In 2007 the regional government of Madrid awarded the Prize for Tolerance to Montaner, a distinction that is awarded to those who have fought for freedom and respect for human rights.

== Career ==
After earning a master's degree at the University of Miami, Montaner taught American literature at the Interamerican University of Puerto Rico from 1966 to 1970. During those years he published four books: Los combatientes (1968), Galdós humorista (1969), Póker de brujas (1970), and Instantáneas al borde del abismo (1970). The last two were also published in English.

Montaner began his career in journalism in 1968, working with Joaquín Maurín, a Spanish exile who had founded the American Literary Agency in New York City at the end of the 1940s with the objective of disseminating democratic ideas in the United States and Latin America. Maurín was a noted Marxist theorist whose thinking had evolved toward liberal democracy after the Spanish Civil War.

Montaner began writing a weekly column which soon became available throughout the rest of Latin America. He also came to be in demand as a lecturer throughout the continent, speaking on the defense of liberty, economic development, and the role of culture in the evolution of societies.

=== 1970s ===
By 1970, his success as a columnist and speaker had made it possible for him to move to Madrid and dedicate his life to his columns and books. He established a publishing house, Editorial Playor, in 1972. His first novel, Perromundo, was published in 1972 and was subsequently made into a movie. His book Informe secreto sobre la revolución cubana was published in 1975, and was followed a year later by 200 años de gringos, celebrating the bicentennial of the United States and contrasting the evolution of the United States with that of Latin America. This contrast between the levels of development in the Americas and the reasons for it would occupy much of his attention thereafter.

As Spain moved rapidly toward democracy after the death of Franco, he joined the Liberal Club of Madrid.

=== 1980s ===
In the 1980s, Montaner began a weekly television commentary that was aired by satellite throughout Latin America. He also produced three books: Fidel Castro y la revolución cubana, subsequently published in English, Italian, and Russian; La agonía de América; and 1898: La trama.

In 1980 he received the ABC Prize for Journalism, awarded by the then Spanish premier Adolfo Suárez. By then, his columns were being published in a number of newspapers in the United States, and the Miami Herald invited him to join its editorial board. He also edited the opinion page of El Nuevo Herald between 1987 and 1989.

=== 1990s ===
In 1990, comments Montaner made on the television show Portada on the Univision network were perceived as offensive to Puerto Ricans. The president of Univision, Joaquin Blaya, supported Montaner, who explained his comment in an article later published in the Wall Street Journal. The controversy resulted in El Diario La Prensa dropping Montaner as a weekly columnist.

In 1992, the Liberal International named Montaner a vice president, which brought him into contact with many of the world's leaders. During the first half of the 1990s, the magazines Ciencia Política of Bogotá and Perfiles Liberales of Mexico City invited him to join their editorial boards, and Newsweek and The Wall Street Journal began to sporadically publish his columns. Montaner produced three books during this period: Cómo y por qué cayó el comunismo; Libertad, la clave de la prosperidad; and Cuba hoy: la lenta muerte del castrismo. He was also named a visiting professor in universities in Guatemala, Ecuador, and Peru.

The best-selling Manual del Perfecto Idiota Latinoamericano, in which he collaborated with Álvaro Vargas Llosa and Plinio Apuleyo Mendoza, was published in 1996 and in English in 2000 by Madison Books. Its sequel, Fabricantes de miseria, was published in 1998. Montaner also authored No perdamos también el siglo XXI (1997) and, in 1999, Viaje al corazón de Cuba.

In 1999, in Madrid, Montaner received the Premio de Periodismo de la Fundación Independiente and the Medalla de la Cultura de Puerto Rico. In the same year he was the recipient of a Premio América award by the de Centro Interamericano Gerencia Política with the inscription, "His writings on freedom have served as a guide to the oppressed and to the emerging democracies."

=== 2000s ===
In 2004 he was invited by The Miami Herald to be part of its editorial board. Since then his weekly columns were published in English.

Books written by Montaner during this period include Las raíces torcidas de América Latina (2002), América Latina y la cultura occidental (2004), and La libertad y sus enemigos (2005), all dealing with the roots of Latin America poverty and underdevelopment. In 2006 Brickell Communicatios Group produced a series of 13 lessons on Cuban history for TV written and narrated by Montaner and published a collection of the scripts in the book Los Cubanos: historia de Cuba en una lección.

In 2007 two more books were published, Las columnas de la libertad and El regreso del idiota, the latter written with Plinio Apuleyo Mendoza and Álvaro Vargas Llosa.

In March and April 2010, Montaner and Cuban singer Silvio Rodríguez had a "compelling exchange of letters on Cuba".

Montaner received an honorary doctoral degree from the Universidad Francisco Marroquín.

His daughter Gina Montaner was married to journalist Jorge Ramos; they had one daughter, Paola (born 1987).

== Death ==
On 6 May 2023, Montaner announced that he was suffering from a neurodegenerative illness for which there was no cure. Montaner died from the illness on 29 June 2023, at the age of 80.

== See also ==
- Ana Navarro
- Anderson Cooper
- Andrés Oppenheimer
- Arianna Huffington
- Carlos Montero
- Christiane Amanpour
- Fareed Zakaria
- Fernando del Rincón
- Geovanny Vicente
- Patricia Janiot
- Pedro Bordaberry
- Sylvia Garcia
- CNN en Español
