= Fernando del Rincón =

Mexican television presenter (born 1969)

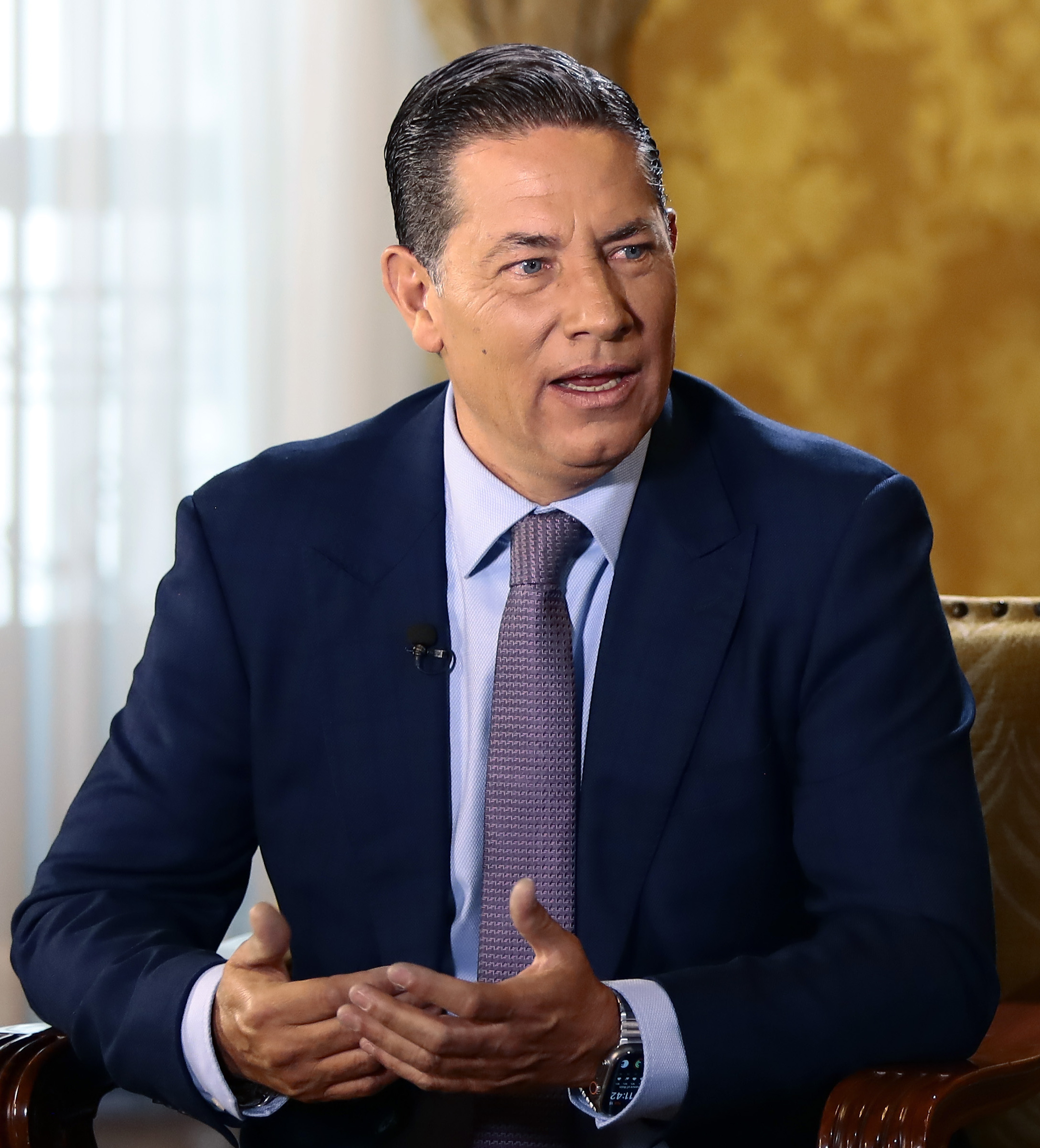
- del Rincón in 2025
- Born: Fernando López Del Rincón; 18 August 1969 (age 57); Morelos, Mexico
- Spouse: Jullye Giliberti
- Presenting career
- Show: Panorama USA
- Network: CNN en Español
- Show: Conclusiones
- Network: CNN en Español
- Country: Mexico

Fernando López del Rincón (Morelos, Mexico, 18 August 1969) is a Mexican television presenter who is well known throughout Latin America and by the Latino community in the U.S. He has worked at both Telemundo and Univision, and since 2010 has been employed by CNN en Español, based in Atlanta, Georgia. He hosts that network's prime-time newscast Panorama USA and also serves as main anchor and producer of Conclusiones.

Originally widely branded as a "pretty boy" who was offered acting jobs on telenovelas, del Rincón later did hard-hitting journalism about drug trafficking and other subjects that resulted in death threats. In 2014, del Rincón was accused by Nicolás Maduro, president of Venezuela, of broadcasting reports that encouraged civil unrest in that country.

Del Rincón has twice been named by the magazine People en Español as the best Spanish-speaking news anchor in the U.S.

He has been accused of domestic abuse by his ex-wife, Carmen Dominicci.

== Early life ==
He was born in the Mexican state of Morelos in 1969. As a child he wanted to be a marine biologist. He began his media career in Tuxtla Gutiérrez, a city in the state of Chiapas. Del Rincón himself has said that his interest in journalism began when he heard a group of indigenous persons speaking in what he thought was a language unknown to him. It turned out to be a dialect of Spanish, and he felt ashamed that he did not know that it was a dialect, and wanted to know about it. This shame and curiosity led him to study journalism. He received a degree in social communication from the Instituto Tecnológico de Monterrey in 1992.

== Career ==
=== Mexico ===
Del Rincón began his journalistic career in Mexico. From 1996 to 1997, he was at TV Azteca in Mexico City, serving as main anchor of the newsmagazine Primer Edicion and as a reporter for the morning newscast Hola Mexico.

From 1997 to 2001, he was main anchor of Fuera de la ley and Duro Y Directo, co-anchor of several special shows, at Televisa in Mexico City, while also serving as main news anchor at Noticias Televisa Monterey.

He worked at XEW Radio (Televisa Radio) in Mexico City from 1999 to 2001, serving as executive producer and main news anchor of the prime-time news show En Directo con Fernando Del Rincon.

=== U.S. ===
More recently, he has been working in the U.S. After a brief period at Telemundo, where he was cohost and producer of the program De mañanita and co-anchored the network's coverage of the 9/11 attacks, Del Rincón attained enormous popularity on Univision, where he worked from 2002 to 2010. At Univision, he served as anchor on the programs Primer Impacto and Ver para creer and was also a correspondent for Noticiero Univision as well as anchor of various other programs and specials.

Fernando Del Rincon and Carmen Dominicci were fired from the program Primer Impacto and the network in 2008 as a result of allegations made by Dominicci of domestic abuse from Del Rincon.

From March 2009 to August 2010, Del Rincón was host of Mega News Nocturno, broadcast by Mega TV, owned by the Spanish Broadcasting System (SBS). Since 2010, Del Rincón has been with CNN. He has cohosted Panorama Mundial with Patricia Janiot and is currently the host of Panorama USA and Conclusiones for CNN Latino. The latter program also appears on CNN en Español. In addition, he has appeared on CNN English.

=== Coverage and interviews ===
Del Rincón has interviewed such celebrated figures as Nobel laureate Rigoberta Menchú, Mexican president Vicente Fox, Iranian president Mahmud Ahmadinejad, and authors Carlos Fuentes and Mario Vargas Llosa. He has also covered the war in Iraq, 9/11, California fires, the Japanese tsunami and earthquake, elections in Venezuela, Guatemala, and Mexico, student protests in Venezuela, and other events of international importance.

=== Accusation by Maduro ===
After del Rincón had reported extensively on anti-Chavista protests in Venezuela and on the authorities’ response to them, the Cuba-friendly website Cubainformación accused him in February 2014 of lying about the Venezuelan government and encouraging protesters.

In March 2014, Nicolás Maduro, the president of Venezuela, accused del Rincón of encouraging unrest in Venezuela. "He is doing war reportage," said Maduro of del Rincón, who at the time was reporting from Venezuela for CNN en Español. "If I deny him permission and expel him from the country, then I'm a dictator and they tell the world I am a dictator." Maduro also made unflattering references to del Rincon's personal life. Del Rincon responded that he found Maduro's remarks “juvenile” but added that for a journalist, being mentioned personally by a head of state is like "gold", and for that "distinction" he was grateful to the president.

== Social media ==
He tweets @soyfdelrincon and is active on Facebook. He also maintains a YouTube channel.

== Honors and awards ==
He was honored in 2006 by having his footprints preserved in cement on the Walk of Fame in Mexico City.

In 2011 and 2013, the magazine People en Español named him the best Spanish-speaking news anchor in the U.S.

== Personal life ==
He has been married twice, the second time to fellow journalist Carmen Dominicci, from whom he divorced on 2008. Since 2010, he has been dating the Venezuelan actress Jullye Giliberti, and in 2014 expressed plans to marry her. In 2014 they married and have been living in Miami since then.

== See also ==
- Ana Navarro
- Anderson Cooper
- Andrés Oppenheimer
- Arianna Huffington
- Carlos Alberto Montaner
- Carlos Montero
- Christiane Amanpour
- Fareed Zakaria
- Geovanny Vicente
- Patricia Janiot
- Pedro Bordaberry
- Sylvia Garcia
- CNN en Español
