= CNN en Español =

Spanish-language television news channel

- Country: United States
- Broadcast area: United States; Latin America (except Cuba)

Programming
- Language: Spanish
- Picture format: HDTV 1080i

Ownership
- Parent: CNN

History
- Launched: March 17, 1997; 29 years ago

Links
- Website: cnnespanol.cnn.com (in Spanish)

Cable News Network en Español (CNN en Español) is a Pan-American Spanish-language news channel, owned by CNN. It was launched on pay television, on March 17, 1997.

== History ==
=== CNN en Español before 1997 ===
CNN Spanish-language news operations began in 1988 with the launch of Noticiero CNN, a daily Spanish-language news program created to serve audiences across Latin America and the United States. Abel Dimant, an Argentine journalist and editor, who was recruited to CNN during this period to be the News Director developed the network's Spanish-language editorial operations. Under his leadership, CNN expanded its Spanish-language news programming through Noticiero CNN Internacional, establishing many of the editorial standards, newsroom practices, and language guidelines that would shape the network's future Spanish-language coverage.

Throughout the late 1980s and early 1990s, CNN continued to expand its presence in the Spanish-speaking market. Dimant remained a key editorial leader and news director during this formative period, helping guide the growth of CNN's Spanish-language journalism and international news coverage. In 1992, CNN International started the Noticiero CNN Internacional, the first in Spanish on that channel. Other programs in Spanish were Las Noticias and Noticias México, all of them presented by the Colombian Patricia Janiot and the Uruguayan Jorge Gestoso, and with the direction of Abel Dimant. The following year, CNN en Español Radio was launched. In 1993, Rolando Santos joined CNN in a senior executive capacity and later assumed leadership roles as the network's Spanish-language operations continued to grow.

The expansion culminated on March 17, 1997, with the launch of CNN en Español, a 24-hour Spanish-language news network serving viewers throughout the Americas. The launch built upon nearly a decade of Spanish-language news programming that began with Noticiero CNN and the editorial foundation established during the network's early years.

In addition, the chain's production centers begin to operate in Buenos Aires and Havana. The correspondent in the Cuban capital was the first office of a U.S. organization on the island.

The channel was added to the Sky Brasil platform on the first week of April 1997.

=== 2010 change ===
In 2010, CNN en Español debuted a new logo, with a new programming lineup.

=== 2022 ===
On February 14, 2022, CNN en Español started broadcasts in 16:9.

=== 2024 ===
On October 8, CNN en Español started broadcasts in Spain.

== Availability ==
CNN en Español is available throughout Hispanic America, and the United States. In Canada, a number of the network's shows are simulcast on Univision Canada. In Venezuela and Nicaragua, the channel is available via live-streaming on YouTube and its official website since 2017 and 2022 respectively.

On February 15, 2017, Venezuela's National Commission of Telecommunications (Conatel) blocked CNN en Español from any national TV provider, saying a report from the network regarding passport fraud was "a threat to the peace and democratic stability" of the nation. Conatel additionally blocked sister network CNN International and BBC World News on April 30, 2019 during an uprising attempt.

On September 22, 2022, CNN en Español was taken off the air from all cable providers in Nicaragua by order of the Nicaraguan Institute of Telecommunications and Post Office (TELCOR).

== Programming ==
=== Live coverage ===
CNN en Español provides live coverage of some news and sporting events held by Turner channels via Warner Bros. Discovery Sports), and from 2016 until 2021, carried the Spanish-language audio for Major League Baseball postseason games carried by sister network TBS only in the United States and Latin America (there were no changes to the English-language visual presentation). CNN en Español features newscasts throughout the day. In 2022, the coverage moved to MLB Network, with added graphical translation.

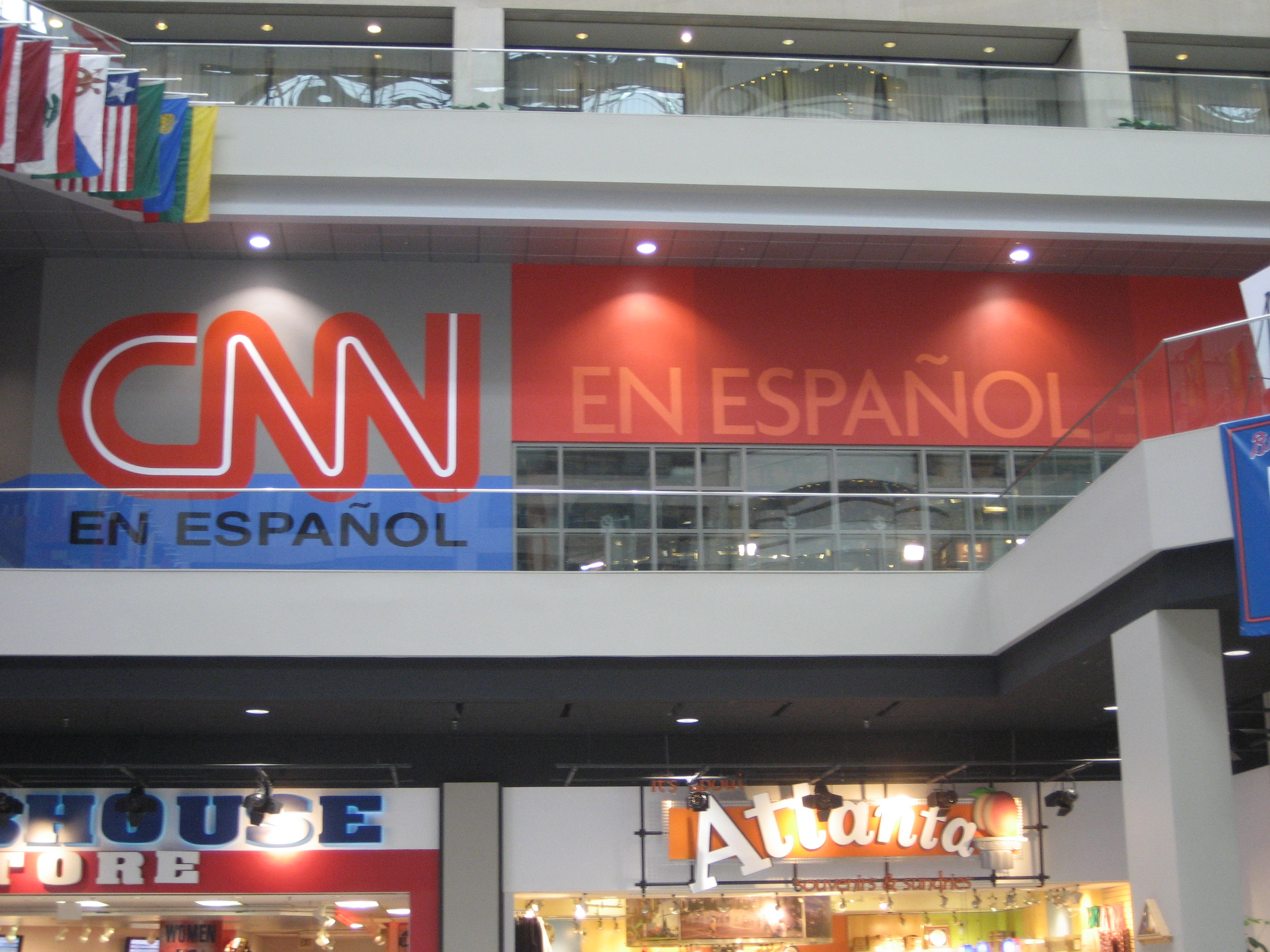
The former CNN en Español newsroom/studio at CNN Center in Atlanta

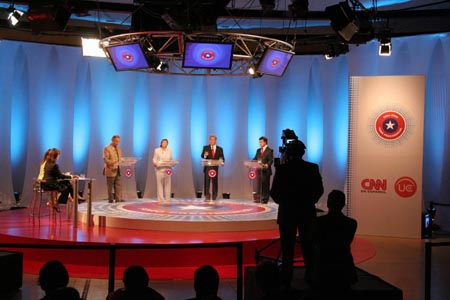
Chilean TV 2005 presidential debate on CNN en Español (Santiago, Chile)

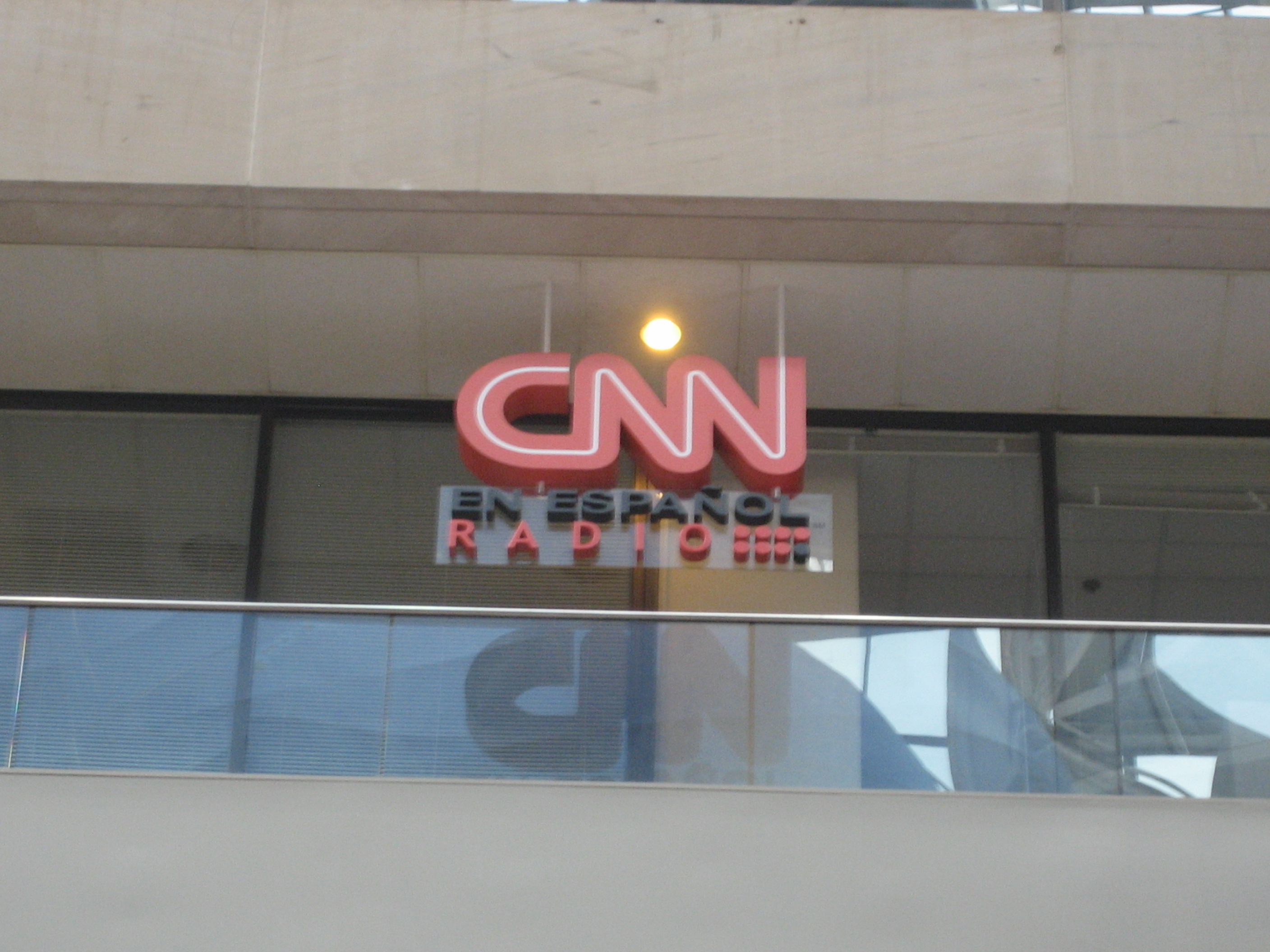
CNN En Español Radio's former CNN Center offices

== Personalities ==
=== Senior Vice President ===
- Cynthia Darr Hudson - VP

=== Anchors ===
- Carmen Aristegui
- Gabriela Frías
- Alejandra Gutiérrez
- Elizabeth Pérez
- Mariela Encarnación
- Fernando del Rincón
- Juan Carlos Arciniegas
- Andres Oppenheimer

== Columnists ==
- Ana Navarro
- Andrés Oppenheimer
- Álvaro Leonel Ramazzini Imeri
- Alan Smolinisky
- Austen Ivereigh
- Carlos Alberto Montaner
- Geovanny Vicente
- Maria Cardona
- Frida Ghitis
- Pedro Bordaberry
- Roberto Izurieta
- Octavio Pescador
- Sylvia Garcia
- Marcelo Longobardi

== See also ==
- List of Spanish-language television networks in the United States
