= Yıldızlar Yatırım Holding =

Turkish company

- Website: yildiz.com/en/

Yıldızlar Yatırım Holding (Yıldızlar Investment Holding) is a Turkish holding company, with headquarters in Kocaeli, and investments in Turkey, USA, Russia, Romania and Slovenia. It is a member of the U.S.-Turkey Business Council. The business started with forest products in the Ottoman Empire, but did not become a company until 1982, in furniture. Subsidiary İGSAŞ makes ammonia and is estimated to have emitted over a million tonnes of greenhouse gas in 2023. Ammonia is used to make fertiliser, some of which is exported from a port in Izmit. Yıldız Enerji invests in solar power.
