= Ernestina Ascencio Rosario =

Mexican murder victim (1934–2007)

- Born: 1934; Zongolica, Veracruz, Mexico
- Died: 6 February 2007 (aged 73); Tetlazinga, Veracruz, Mexico

Ernestina Ascencio Rosario (1934 – 6 February 2007) was indigenous Nahua native to the mountains of Zongolica, Veracruz, Mexico. Her death at 73 years of age caused uproar across Mexico as a result of the accusations that she had been raped and murdered by several Mexican soldiers, but these allegations were not officially substantiated. Authorities later determined her death to be of natural causes, without criminal implications. This version has not convinced the family or human rights advocacy groups. The case was reopened in 2020, and in 2021, the National Human Rights Commission (CNDH) released a report acknowledging the violence done to Ascencio and providing recommendations for reparation.

== Case description ==
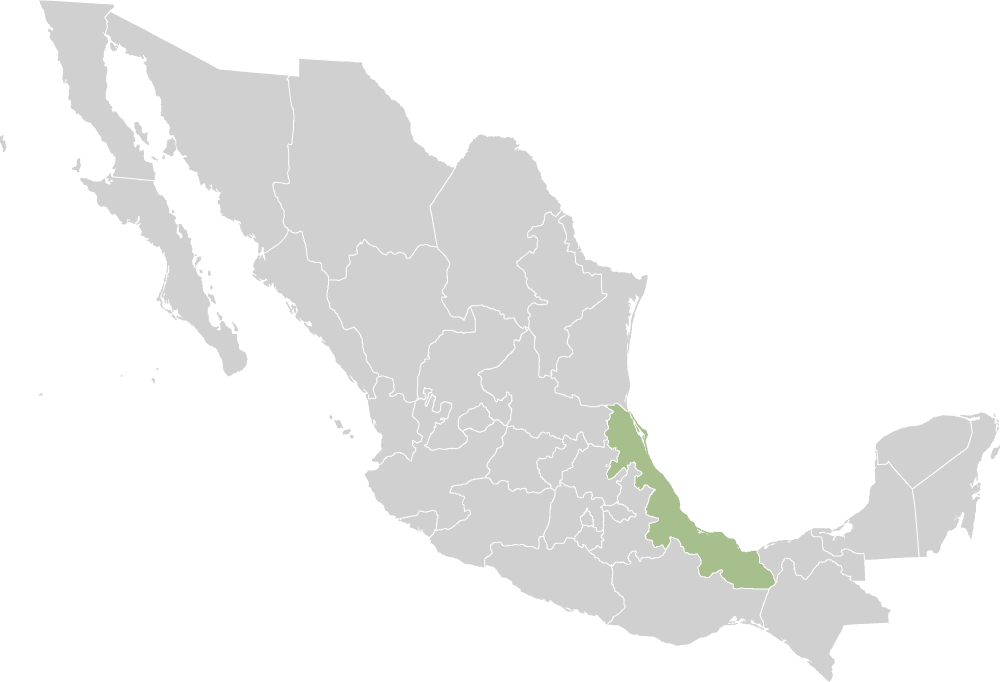
The State of Veracruz.

Ernestina Ascencio Rosario died while herding sheep in Tetlatzinga community. She was found lying on the grass, still alive, and allegedly managed to say that she had been assaulted by soldiers. The first autopsy confirmed that she had been the victim of rape.

The social outrage in Soledad Atzompa, Veracruz, was such that the detachment of soldiers assigned to the area were forced to withdraw. Previously, the behavior of these soldiers had been the subject of written complaints to the local authority, but no action had been taken. The Secretariat of National Defense denied any connection to the death of Rosario, whose death was blamed on natural causes. This version of events was also defended by President Felipe Calderón.

The controversy reached the municipal, state and federal level (including President Calderón), to the highest echelons of the military, the opposition political parties, and the National Human Rights Commission (CNDH).

Conflicting accounts of the events have continued to be the subject of disagreement. While some maintain that she died at the hands of the soldiers stationed nearby, others say she died due to complications from an ulcer. The first cause of death was initially defended by the government of Veracruz, the second by the Presidency of the Republic and then by the National Human Rights Commission.

Her death and the subsequent confusion over its cause reflect different problems in Mexican political and social life, such as indigenous rights, women's rights, poverty, democracy, the role of the military in peacetime, and the objectivity of the media, amongst others.

== Chronology of events ==
=== 2007 ===
- 26 February – Ernestina Ascencio is found dying by her daughter, on a plain 100 metres (330 ft) from a military base in Zongolica, Veracruz.
- 6 March – The Secretariat of National Defense (SEDENA) issued a statement acknowledging that Ascencio was raped, but blaming criminals who opposed the Mexican military. It read in part, "groups opposed to this military base have repeatedly questioned the actions it carries out for the benefit of Mexican society and in this particular case, criminals who used military clothing perpetrated the crime, seeking to incriminate members of this agency of the federal executive and to leave the area in order to continue their activities."
- 13 March – Before the Office of Veracruz, the Department of National Defense and the National Human Rights Commission had finished their investigation, President Calderón said in an interview with La Jornada that Ascencio died of "chronic gastritis".
- 28 March – National Action Party (PAN) deputy, retired Gen. Jorge González, showed reporters in the Chamber of Deputies a CNDH document that contained the expected clinical causes of death of Ernestina Ascencio, ruling out rape.
- 6 April – The manager of Social Communication of the Army, Brigadier General Mario Lucio González Cortés, sent a letter to the newspaper La Jornada, noting that "[t]he Ministry of National Defense does not have any sample of seminal fluid allegedly found in the body of Mrs. Ernestina Ascencio Rosario, and has never had it".
- 24 April – The governor of Veracruz, Fidel Herrera, meets with the President of the CNDH.
- 30 April – The case is closed by special prosecutor of Veracruz. The justice of the investigation, Juan Alatriste, partially agreed with the CNDH, in concluding that the 73-year-old "was not raped," but died of "parasitosis".

=== 2010 ===
- 15 March – The State Attorney General (Procuraduría General de Justicia del Estado, or PGJE) disbarred medical examiner Dr. Juan Pablo Mendizábal Pérez, who performed the first autopsy on the body of the Rosario. He was disbarred due to allegedly contaminating blood samples and erroneously certifying that he found during the autopsy. "In an interview on the radio and TV for MVS Radio conducted by Carmen Aristegui, Dr. Mendizábal Pérez defended his position that Ascencio's body was found with a significant amount of sperm in the vagina and rectum, and that the substance tested positive for prostatic proteins and Y chromosome. Additionally, the doctor defended his initial description of the injuries, reiterating the presence of rectal and vaginal tears indicating nonconsensual penetration. During the interview, the doctor said that the autopsy was conducted at a private funeral home, due to the lack of an available surgical theatre. The doctor also said that this case highlights the involvement of different levels Mexican government — from municipal to federal — in the silencing of the case in order to protect the image of the army, whose staff seem to be primarily responsible for the violation of indigenous rights. During the interview, the doctor contended that the evidence that Rosario was raped is incontrovertible, and the fact that it was denied is possibly "the greatest fraud" by Dr. José Luis Soberanes who then presided over the National Human Rights Commission (from MVS radio broadcast of Carmen Aristegui dated 17 March 2010).

=== 2020 ===
- 10 December – The Mexican government reopens the case for review.

=== 2021 ===
- 12 March – The CNDH initiates a review of its 2007 case file and decision.
- August – The CNDH issues a report acknowledging and offering recommendations.

== Media impact ==
The case of Ernestina Ascencio Rosario had national impact and related to other abuses of authority, as the events of police repression in Atenco or the Oaxaca teachers' conflict, in which several women were assaulted by state and federal police.

The National Commission on Human Rights, led by Dr. José Luis Soberanes, acted for the perpetrators and was called before the federal deputies responsible for making recommendations to the agencies involved in the case, including SEDENA.

== Case closure ==
The Attorney General of the State of Veracruz began an investigation into the case, which ended on 1 May 2007. Having determined that Asuncio's death was a natural death "by parasitosis", no criminal action was appropriate.

However, the case was reopened in 2020, and in 2021, the National Human Rights Commission released a report acknowledging the violence done to Ascencio and offering recommendations of further steps, including a public apology from the government.
