= Club de Periodistas de Mexico =

Association of journalists in Mexico

The Club de Periodistas de Mexico (Mexican Press Club) is an association of journalists in Mexico. Since 1952 the Club organises annual awards for journalists, with recipients including Carmen Aristegui.
