= El Tiempo Latino =

Spanish-language newspaper in Washington, D.C., United States

- Type: Weekly newspaper
- Format: Broadsheet
- Owner: Javier Marin
- Editor: Rafael Ulloa
- Founded: 1991; 35 years ago
- Headquarters: Washington, D.C., U.S.
- Circulation: 50,371 (as of 2021)
- Website: eltiempolatino.com

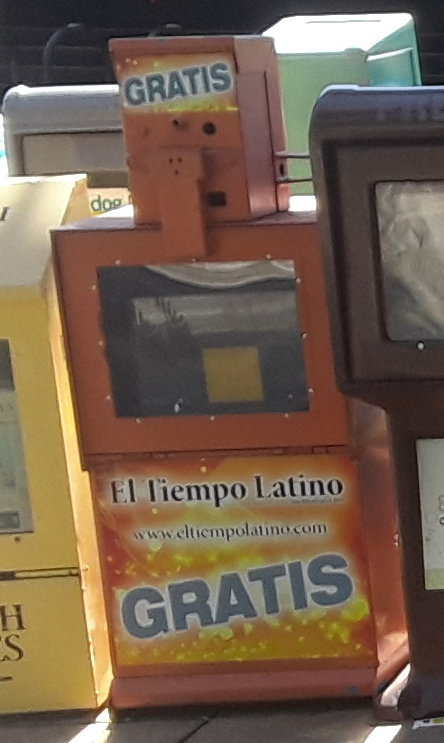
An El Tiempo Latino dispenser at Huntington metro station

El Tiempo Latino is a Spanish-language free-circulation weekly newspaper published in Washington, D.C., United States. The paper was founded in 1991 and acquired by The Washington Post Company in 2004. After Nash Holdings, the Jeff Bezos-controlled company, acquired the Post in 2013, el Tiempo Latino was sold to Javier Marin, a Venezuelan-American businessman, in 2016. The newspaper publishes 50,000 copies every Friday (ABC audited) distributed in 1,700 points of distribution throughout the Washington DC metropolitan area and has a weekly readership of over 120,000 readers, according to Scarborough Research.

El Tiempo Latino has received major awards from the Hispanic print industry. The publication was named the Best Hispanic Weekly in the United States by The National Association of Hispanic Publications at the 2014 José Martí Awards ceremony. This was the 14th time and the 10th year in a row that El Tiempo Latino has received this award in its 23 years' existence. More than 200 entries competed for awards. In 2014, El Tiempo Latino received a total of 14 distinctions for news stories, photography, editorial cartoon, newspaper sections, editorial video, design and web site.

== Columnists ==
- Ricardo Sánchez-Silva
- Abril Gordienko López
- Ana Julia Jatar
- Ann Marie Benitez
- Beatriz De Majo
- Carlos E. Ponce
- Eridania Bidó Fernández
- Fernando Pinilla
- Geovanny Vicente
- Héctor Schamis
- José López Zamorano
- Luis Alberto Perozo Padua
- Luis Fernando Vélez Gutiérrez
- Maibort Petit
- Miguel Castro Luna
- Noelia Izarza
- Daisy Novoa Vásquez
