= Alejandra Oraa =

Venezuelan television anchor (born 1987)

- Born: Alejandra Gutierrez Oraa; 9 December 1987 (age 37); La Guaira, Vargas, Venezuela
- Citizenship: Venezuela (birthplace), United States
- Occupation: Anchor
- Years active: 2006–present
- Website: cnnespanol.cnn.com/category/presentadores/alejandra-oraa/

Alejandra Gutiérrez Oraa is a Venezuelan television anchor she worked for CNN en Español in Atlanta, Georgia, United States since 2009 until her departure in December 2024.

== Early life ==
A native of La Guaira, Venezuela, Oraa moved to the United States as a teenager due to a catastrophic event in her hometown known as the Vargas tragedy. In 1999, the geographic center of Vargas state suffered devastating floods and landslides, which resulted in a major loss of life and property, forced population movements, and the virtual disappearance of several small towns in Vargas state.

== Career ==
Oraa started her television career at age 18 as an entertainment reporter for TV Azteca in Miami. She also gained experience working with Fox Sports en Español, covering special events such as Super Bowl XLI.

In 2008, Oraa was chosen for a new style of reality morning show at one of Miami's most popular Hispanic radio stations, Romance 106.7 FM. There she hosted Hola Miami, a reality morning show featuring three women born in different decades. The show was later renamed Paparazzi Radio Sensacional. While working in radio, Oraa became known as the voice of numerous international campaigns for HBO's Sex and the City, Olive Garden, Ford, and Marshalls. In 2010, she joined the news team of Mega TV to become part of the journalistic team of Mega News, a national newscast that covered the breaking stories of the day.

Oraa is one of the news anchors for CNN en Español's morning show Café CNN, a four-hour program that airs weekdays between 6 a.m. and 10 a.m. (ET) designed to blend hard news with human interest and lifestyle improvement information to help viewers "stay ahead in today’s competitive world." At 23, she became the youngest news anchor for CNN en Español and its affiliates.

On December 9, 2024, the day she turned 37, she announced her departure from the news network, after 15 years, in order to undertake personal projects
