= Carmen Dominicci =

Puerto Rican journalist (born 1966)

- Born: Carmen Dominicci Ramos; July 15, 1966 (age 60); Ponce, Puerto Rico
- Education: Universidad del Sagrado Corazón
- Occupations: Travel blogger Journalist; Television host
- Awards: 5 Emmy Awards; 1 ACE Award; 1 George Polk Award; 1 GLAAD Award
- Website: Sitio oficial

Carmen Dominicci Ramos (born July 15, 1966) is a Puerto Rican travel blogger, journalist, news anchor in the United States, and the winner of five Emmy Awards. People en Español magazine chose her as one of the "50 Most Beautiful" of 2010. She began her show business career as a model and actress.

== Early years and education ==
Carmen Dominicci Ramosis a journalist, news anchor, and travel blogger. She is the creator of Carmen Dominicci Trotamundos, a travel blog focusing on international tourism destinations.

Dominicci was born in Ponce, Puerto Rico, on July 15, 1966. She studied primary education in local schools and graduated magna cum laude from the Universidad del Sagrado Corazón with a degree in Journalism and Social Communication.

== Career in television ==
Dominicci began appearing in television commercials in the late 1980s. She represented Puerto Rico in various beauty pageants and international modeling competitions in the United States and Europe.

She pursued a career in television, first in theatrical plays and then in television miniseries, but she left that path to focus fully to her journalism studies.

In 1989 she married Puerto Rican actor Osvaldo Ríos with whom she had a son, Giuliano Ríos Dominicci. She and Osvaldo divorced in 1993.

In the 1990s, Carmen Dominicci became a prominent news reporter in Puerto Rico thanks to her work on the Tele-Once Channel, and later as the presenter on WAPA-TV's prime time newscast.

=== Arrival at Telemundo ===
In 1998, she signed a contract with Telemundo 47, New York, as a news anchor, position she held for four years, and in which she covered important events such as President Bill Clinton's impeachment trial, the inauguration of President George Bush and the 9-11 attacks on the Twin Towers, among others.

=== Jump to Univision ===
In 2002 Carmen Dominicci joined the Univision network as a presenter of the "Primer Impacto" news program where she worked for three years, and conducted the night edition of the same program. Among her outstanding coverages were the death of Pope John Paul II, (broadcast directly from Rome, Italy), and the investigative series “Infierno Animal" and "Tragedia en Jimaní" and "Tragedia en Jimaní”, about the tragic landslide that caused the death of more than 400 people.

In October 2005, Carmen Dominicci and Rolando Nichols became presenters of the "TeleFutura en Vivo y en Directo”. The following year Carmen returned to Univision as a correspondent of the investigative show "Aquí y Ahora", where she worked until 2009.

While she was working on "Aquí y Ahora" in 2007, Univision's sister network, Galavision, created the journalistic talent contest "Misión Reportar", and Carmen was chosen as the host.

In that same year the journalist married her ex-coworker of "Primer Impacto", Fernando del Rincón, but the couple divorced in 2008.

=== Return to Telemundo ===
In 2009, Dominicci returned to Telemundo as a news anchor for the 'Telemundo News' team which by then was already part of the NBC conglomerate.

During this period, she covered events such as the 2010 Haiti earthquake, the rescue of the 33 miners and the catastrophe of the earthquake and tsunami in Chile, both in 2010.

In 2011, she joined as a co-host and correspondent for the "Al Rojo Vivo" news program and joined the special investigative team of Noticias Telemundo, where she won several awards for the special "Muriendo por Cruzar”, about immigration at the Mexican / American border. She also interviewed notable personalities such as soccer player David Beckham.

During one documentary Dominicci did for Telemundo and for The Weather Channel about immigration to the United States which was named "Muriendo Por Cruzar" ("Dying to Cross"), she had the gruesome experience of recording a scene in which she stood in front of a dozen dead people. (warning: graphic content)

=== Travel blogging ===
Her passion to travel the world led Carmen Dominicci to make a complete change in her career.

After leaving her job at Telemundo, in December 2015, she launched her own travel blog called "Carmen Dominicci Trotamundos," under the motto "Travel the world through my eyes".

The blog provides travel advice, cost-saving techniques, and coverage of various tourist destinations.

== Awards and honors ==
Dominicci has received the following awards and nominations:

- 1995 Paoli Award.
- 1999 Ace Award.
- 2000 Regional Emmy Award: Outstanding Unique Presenter Category in News Show.
- 2001 Regional Emmy Award: Outstanding Unique Presenter Category in News Show.
- 2002 Regional Emmy Award: Outstanding Unique Presenter Category in News Show.
- 2013 Emmy Award: Excellence in Coverage of Breaking News in Spanish.
- 2015 Emmy Award: Excellence in Investigative Journalism in Spanish.
- 2015 GLAAD Award: Category "Best Journalism in Spanish Television", for her interview with boxer Orlando Cruz.
- 2015 GLAAD Award: Nomination for "Open your heart: interview with Patricia Velásquez" made for Al Rojo Vivo before leaving the network.
- 2015 George Polk Award: As Best TV Feature, presenter and correspondent for Telemundo's "Muriendo por Cruzar" special in 2015. The program chronicled the substantial increase in immigrant deaths as they attempted to cross the Mexican-American border around Falfurrias, Texas, where adverse weather conditions are extreme.

=== Other important appearances ===
- 2004 Presenter of the live special "Noche de Estrellas de Premio Lo Nuestro", Univision.
- 2005 Presenter "Premio Lo Nuestro a La Música Latina", Univision.
- 2011 Ambassador of the organization Cielo Latino, where she helped spread the message of prevention and research of a cure for AIDS.
- 2011 Presenter "Billboard Latin Music Awards", Telemundo.
- 2014 Presenter "Billboard Latin Music Awards", Telemundo.
- 2014 Speaker of the "Congress of Women Leaders in Guatemala".
- 2015 Host of the TV special "Siempre Selena", commemorating the 20th anniversary of the murder of Tex-Mex singer Selena.
- 2015 Ambassador of the 58th edition of the Puerto Rican National Parade, on Fifth Avenue in New York.
- 2017 The city of Orlando, Florida, named every January 15 as the "Official Day of Carmen Dominicci."

== See also ==
- List of Puerto Ricans
- Corsican immigration to Puerto Rico
- List of television presenters/Puerto Rico
