= Duro Y Directo =

- Presented by: Fernando del Rincón
- Country of origin: Mexico

Production
- Running time: 90 minutes

Original release
- Network: Televisa Canal 9 Univision (USA)
- Release: November 24, 1997 – July 16, 1999

Duro Y Directo was a Mexican tabloid news magazine that aired on Televisa from 1997 to 1999. The program was presented by Fernando del Rincón.

== Overview ==
As a replacement to its predecessor, Fuera de la Ley, Duro y Directo was launched in November 1997, on XEQ-TV. Its format was a true crime news magazine, focusing on the criminal crisis in Mexico. In such rare instances, viewers were given the opportunity to call the program for emergency help, before calling emergency services. Reporters would also go to the scene of emergency and provide assistance.

During its run, Duro y Directo garnered at 12-point rating average, making it the most watched news magazine in Mexico at the time. Its highest viewership was received for its coverage of the death of Paco Stanley. Because of its popularity, Duro y Directo was also broadcast in the United States on Univision, from September 1998.

=== Criticism ===
Despite being a popular program in Mexico, politicians and some members of society criticized the program for its controversial depiction of blood and violence. President Ernesto Zedillo called on the media to limit the amount of on-air violence, which eventually led to the cancellation of Duro y Directo in the year 1999 and other news magazines.
