= Jennifer Miel =

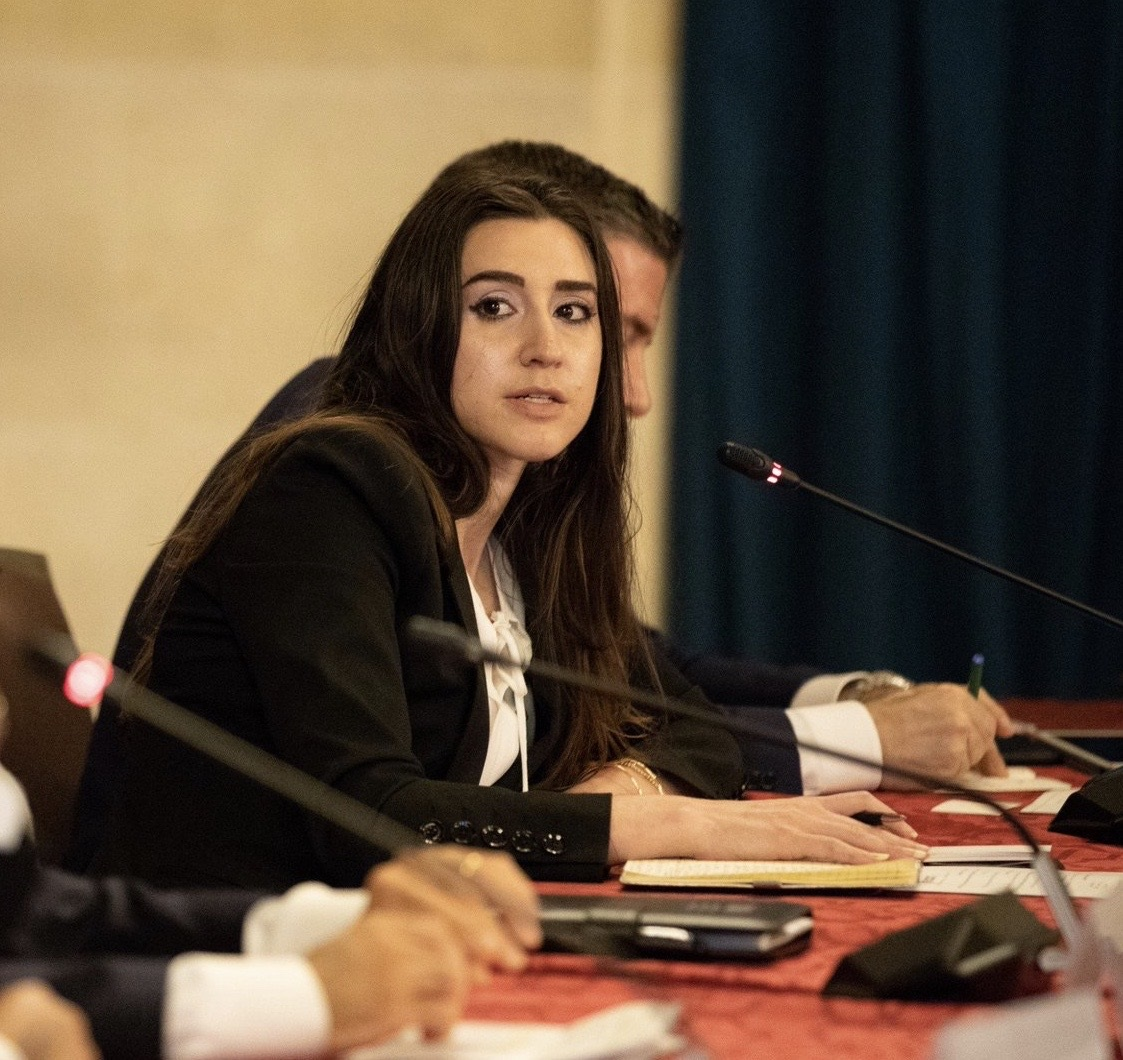
- Born: Fort Lauderdale, Florida, United States
- Education: Cornell University Georgetown University
- Occupations: Business and Foreign Affairs Advisor
- Employer: United States Chamber of Commerce
- Organization: United States Chamber of Commerce
- Spouse: Geovanny Vicente
- Children: Marvin Alejandro Vicente Miel

Jennifer Miel (born in Fort Lauderdale, Florida, United States) is the Vice President of the United States Chamber of Commerce for the Middle East, Central Asia, and Turkey, where she leads the U.S.-Turkey Business Council and the U.S.-Kazakhstan Business Council at the U.S. Chamber of Commerce, the home of the bilateral commercial relationship between the United States and each one of its international business partners around the world.

== Education ==
Miel earned a B.S. in urban and regional planning and a B.A. in Spanish literature from Cornell University. She completed her graduate studies in public policy at Georgetown University.

== Career ==
As the Executive Director of the U.S. Chamber of Commerce's U.S.-Turkey Business Council, Miel works closely with senior business leaders and has expanded the program from 12 to 60+ of the largest U.S. companies to advance their investments in Turkey. She directs the Council's policy and programmatic agenda, including meetings with heads of state, senior government officials and the preparation and launch of report, "Upgrading the U.S.-Turkey Commercial Relationship: A Shared Vision toward a U.S.-Turkey Free Trade Agreement," in Ankara in September 2015.

Miel also serves as the U.S.-Bahrain Business Council Executive Director and the U.S. Chamber of Commerce's Turkey and Senior Director for Middle East Affairs supporting programming and policy formulation across Egypt and the Gulf Cooperation Council countries.

Jennifer played an integral role in establishing both the U.S.-Turkey Business Council and the U.S.-Kazakhstan Business Council at the U.S. Chamber. She is also responsible for managing the Chamber’s U.S.-Israel Business Council as well as other activities and advocacy work in Jordan and Lebanon. In 2024, Jennifer, in partnership with the U.S Chamber of Commerce's Global Energy Institute, is spearheading the Chamber’s plans for COP29.

In March 2024, Miel was appointed Vice President of Middle East, Central Asia, and Turkey at the U.S. Chamber of Commerce.

== Achievements ==
In 2014, she was part of the team that led the U.S. Chamber of Commerce to open its Regional Office in Istanbul which she now directs from Washington. This new office has established a permanent advocacy presence in the region for U.S. companies to grow and create enhanced economic opportunities for countries in Turkey and the Middle East.

In 2017, Miel was named one of the top 40 latino young professionals in foreign policy under 40 by the Huffington Post. Additionally, she is active in the Association for Women in International Trade. Also, Miel has participated in the Million Women Mentors Summit.

== Personal life ==
Miel married Geovanny Vicente, professor, political strategist and CNN columnist, on August 25, 2019. The couple has a son, Marvin Alejandro Vicente Miel, born in 2020.

== Publications ==
• Miel, Jennifer. Why is Turkey Strategically Important for the United States? The Economic Dimension in the Age of Global Challenges and Challengers. In Daniel S. Hamilton, Serdar Altay & Aylin Ünver Noi (Eds.), Turkey in the North Atlantic Marketplace. Center for Transatlantic Relations SAIS. 2018. ISBN 978-1947661073.

• Miel, Jennifer.The Post-COVID-19 Economic Recovery: U.S.-Turkey Commercial Ties that Bind. Insight Turkey. 2020.

• Myron Brilliant, Jennifer Miel. 3 ways the US and Turkey can do business together. Business Insider. 2016.
