= U.S.-Turkey Business Council =

Business advocacy organization

U.S.-Turkey Business Council (USTBC)
- Company type: Non-profit
- Founded: 2013; 13 years ago
- Headquarters: Washington, D.C., United States
- Key people: Muhtar Kent; Ahmet Bozer; Myron Brilliant; General James L. Jones; Khush Choksy; Jennifer Miel; Dave MacLennan
- Website: Official Website

The U.S.-Turkey Business Council (USTBC) was founded in 2013, with the participation of then Prime Minister Recep Tayyip Erdoğan and Vice President Joe Biden, as a business advocacy organization established to expand the bilateral commercial relationship between Turkey and United States.

== Organization ==
The United States Chamber of Commerce’s U.S.-Turkey Business Council consists of more than 115 U.S. and Turkish businesses, and works to advance the interests of the approximately 1,700 U.S. companies invested in Turkey with assets totaling $31 billion. The council also facilitates growing Turkish investment in the U.S., which currently stands at $2.4 billion. Through the council, U.S. and Turkish companies collaborate to establish partnerships and advocate for economic, legal, and political policies that expand bilateral trade between the United States and Turkey, open new markets to foreign direct investment, and create employment opportunities in both countries. The Council regularly convenes U.S. and Turkish government officials together with the respective business communities to share details of business opportunities and foster a more open and predictable investment environment.

In September 2019, the U.S. Chamber of Commerce's U.S.-Turkey Business Council (USTBC) and the American-Turkish Council (ATC) announced their integration.

== Business advocacy ==
In 2014, the U.S. Chamber of Commerce opened its Regional Office in Istanbul. This new office has established a permanent advocacy presence in the region for U.S. companies to grow and create enhanced economic opportunities for countries in Turkey and the Middle East.
