= Carlos Montero =

Argentine journalist and news anchor (born 1963)

- Born: March 20, 1963 (age 63); Buenos Aires, Argentina
- Occupations: Journalist and news anchor
- Spouse: Vandi Lynn Triplett

Carlos Esteban Montero Fernández (born 20 March 1963 in Buenos Aires) is an Argentine journalist and news anchor. He worked at CNN en Español for 20 years until on 30 November 2017, he announced that his contract was not renewed. He was the anchor of Café CNN and La Noticia de la Semana.

== Career ==
Carlos Montero is a journalist in Latin America. With 30 years of experience in the US and in his native country of Argentina, Carlos has had the opportunity to cover important events of international interest, both on the ground and from the studio. Among the special events he has covered are the death of Princess Diana, the war in Iraq, the capture of Saddam Hussein, the Arab Spring, the terrorist attacks of 9/11 (Montero was broadcasting live when the planes crashed into the Twin Towers), and several elections in the Americas, including Argentina, Paraguay, Nicaragua, Chile, Bolivia and the United States.

Montero was one of the original team of CNN en Español presenters, where he worked for 21 years until opening his own production company "Montero Media". He was also the presenter of NBC Canal de Noticias and Channel 2 of Argentina. From 1989 to 1994 he was a reporter and producer of the news department of Univisión in Miami and a correspondent in the United States of Telefé Noticias from Argentina.

Carlos began his career in the media at the young age of 15 as a production assistant in his father's production company, Montero Producciones. Born in Buenos Aires, Montero graduated in Mass Media Communications from Appalachian State University in Boone, North Carolina. He has received several awards for his journalistic work, including five Emmy awards, a Telly Award and a Conscience Award. Montero speaks Spanish and English.

Before joining CNN, Montero worked as host of Buenos Días América and América Noticias in América Televisión from 1994. He was also producer and reporter of the news department of the American Spanish-language network Univisión from 1992 to 1994 and correspondent of the Argentine channel Telefé. In 1996, he joined the defunct channel NBC Canal de Noticias.

Montero was one of the members of the original staff of CNN en Español from its inception in 1997. He anchored the defunct morning news program Al Día and from 2011 anchored Café CNN and was a regular analyst in CNN International.

As of December 1, 2017, Carlos Montero is no longer part of CNN as he has not renewed his contract. After opening his production company in 2018, he joined Appalachian State University as Practitioner in Residence of the award-winning AppTv. He teaches broadcast performance techniques and TV news and sport reporting.

== Events covered ==
- The 1993 World Trade Center bombing.
- The peace treaty between Israel and Palestine.
- The 1993 Guatemalan constitutional crisis.
- The Lewinsky scandal and subsequent Impeachment of Bill Clinton.
- The 1996 Republican National Convention.
- The death and funeral of Diana, Princess of Wales.
- Several elections in the United States.
- The Iraq War
- The 2004 Madrid train bombings

== Interviewed ==
- Carlos Menem
- Andrés Pastrana
- Vicente Fox
- Al Gore
- Colin Powell
- Rigoberta Menchú
- Adolfo Pérez Esquivel
- Fernando Lugo
