= Ana Navarro =

American political strategist and commentator (born 1971)

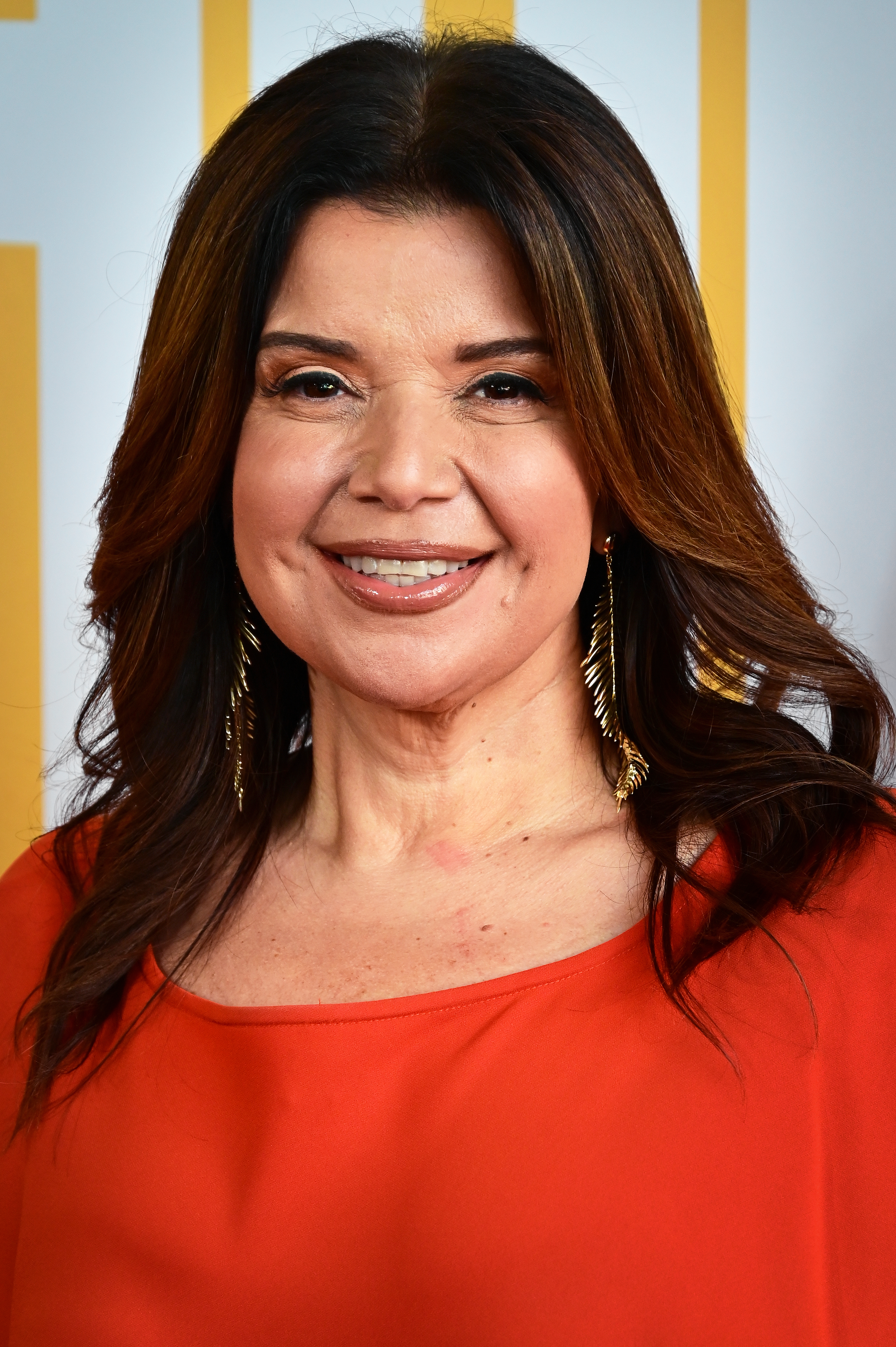
- Navarro in 2026
- Born: Ana Violeta Navarro Flores; December 28, 1971 (age 54); Chinandega, Nicaragua
- Education: University of Miami (BA); St. Thomas University (JD)
- Occupations: Political commentator, strategist
- Employers: CNN; ABC
- Spouse: Al Cárdenas (m. 2019)

Ana Violeta Navarro-Cárdenas (née Navarro Flores; born December 28, 1971) is a Nicaraguan-American political strategist and commentator. She appears on various television programs and news outlets, including CNN, CNN en Español, ABC News, and Telemundo. She is also a co-host of daytime talk show The View, garnering Daytime Emmy Award nominations for her work.

Navarro has described her political position as "centrist". She supported John McCain and Jeb Bush's presidential campaigns, but has also been a vocal critic of president Donald Trump and his administration. She spoke in support of Kamala Harris's presidential campaign at the 2024 Democratic National Convention and supported Hillary Clinton and Joe Biden in their presidential campaigns.

== Early life and education ==
Born in 1971 to a wealthy land-owning agricultural family in Nicaragua, Navarro is the daughter of Violeta Flores López and José Augusto Navarro Flores, a former minister of agriculture under the administration of Enrique Bolaños Geyer. She and her family moved to the United States in 1980 because of political turmoil, though her father, who had also been persecuted as an opponent of the Somoza regime, stayed behind to continue to fight with the Contras against the Sandinista government. She later said that then U.S. president Ronald Reagan's support of the Contras made her a lifelong Republican.

Navarro attended the Carrollton School of the Sacred Heart, a private Catholic college preparatory day school for girls in Coconut Grove, Miami. Navarro earned a bachelor's degree in Latin American studies and political science in 1993 from the University of Miami. In 1997, she earned her Juris Doctor from St. Thomas University School of Law.

During her first year in university, Navarro campaigned for aid to the Contras. As a law student, Navarro successfully fought to keep Nicaraguan refugees from being deported during the mid-nineties.

== Career ==
Navarro was a member of the Republican Party. She served in a number of Republican administrations, including as part of the transition team for Florida governor Jeb Bush in 1998 and also as Bush's director of immigration policy. She also served as ambassador to the United Nations Commission on Human Rights, where she condemned human rights violations in Cuba. She later served as national co-chair of the Hispanic Advisory Council for John McCain in 2008 and Jon Huntsman Jr. in 2012.

In February 2014, she became a political commentator at ABC News. In addition, she is also a political commentator on CNN and CNN en Español. Navarro became a contributor on ABC daytime talk show The View in 2013. She joined the series as a weekly guest co-host in 2018 and a permanent co-host in 2022. She received Daytime Emmy Award nominations for Outstanding Informative Talk Show Host in 2020 and 2022 as well as Outstanding Daytime Talk Series Host in 2024.

== Political positions ==
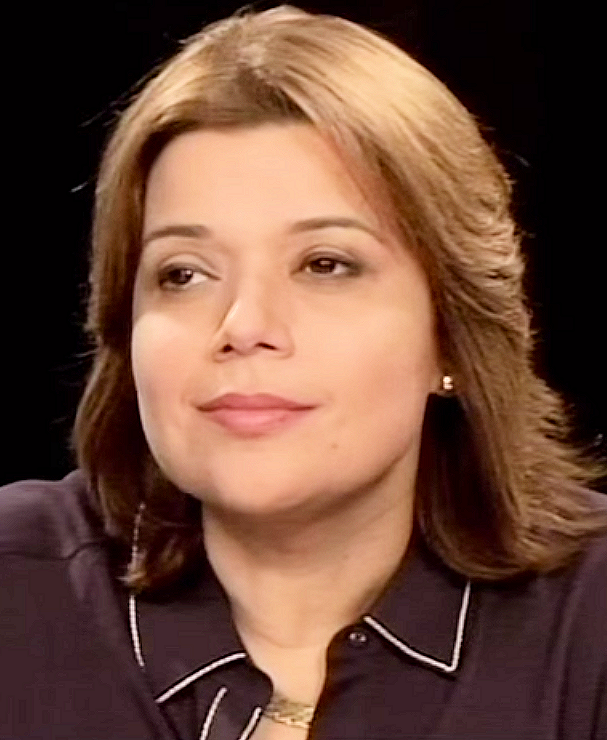
Navarro in 2016

Navarro supported Jeb Bush's 2016 presidential campaign. In October 2016, she made headlines when she strongly criticized Republican presidential nominee Donald Trump on CNN after the Donald Trump and Billy Bush recording surfaced, and she called for party leaders to disown Trump. She also harshly criticized Trump's comments about immigrants, labeling him a racist. Navarro has been labeled a "Never Trumper." She voted for Democratic presidential nominee Hillary Clinton, stating that she decided to do so after seeing how close the race in Florida had become.

Navarro was a vocal opponent of Roy Moore in the 2017 Alabama Senate election, due to the allegations of sexual assault and molestation against him. In the 2018 Florida gubernatorial election, after having previously been a "lifelong Republican", Navarro voted for Democrat Andrew Gillum over Republican Ron DeSantis because of DeSantis's ties to Trump.

On August 11, 2020, she stated that she would be voting for Democratic presidential candidate Joe Biden in the 2020 United States presidential election. She and George Lopez hosted an online concert fundraiser for Biden on October 25, 2020.

She is a strong supporter of LGBTQ+ rights. In February 2013, Navarro publicly supported legalization of same-sex marriage in an amicus curiae brief submitted to the U.S. Supreme Court. In 2017, she spoke out against the Trump administration's ban on transgender individuals serving in the military, calling it "repugnant". In 2019, she was given the Ally Leadership Award by Equality California for her activism in support of the LGBTQ+ community. In 2022, she criticized passage of the Florida Parental Rights in Education Act, calling it "completely unnecessary"; in 2023, she spoke out against drag panic and anti-drag legislation.

After the Supreme Court overturned Roe v. Wade—which had legalized abortion nationwide—while personally pro-life, she spoke out in support of abortion rights, citing family members who have difficulty caring for relatives with physical and developmental disabilities. She also opposed the Texas Supreme Court temporarily blocking a judge’s decision to allow a woman to receive an emergency abortion.

The day after the Robb Elementary School shooting in May 2022, Navarro declared strong support for increased gun control efforts, including an assault weapons ban. She criticized the National Rifle Association of America and other gun lobby groups, as well as officials in her own party, saying, "I would like Republicans to show the same energy that they do for banning books, and banning conversations about gays, and banning conversations about black history, and regulating my uterus, I want them to show the same energy for banning guns."

Navarro was supportive of Democratic nominee Kamala Harris in the 2024 United States presidential election, and acted as official emcee of the second evening of the 2024 Democratic National Convention.

On December 2, 2024, while defending Joe Biden for pardoning his son Hunter, Navarro tweeted about various presidents that had pardoned family members, including Trump's pardon of his daughter’s father-in-law, Charles Kushner. One name in the tweet was "Hunter deButts", which was an error; Navarro later thanked "Twitter sleuths" for "taking the time to provide context", and posted the ChatGPT screenshot that had provided the inaccurate information.

== Personal life ==
Navarro resides in Miami.

She married lawyer and lobbyist Al Cárdenas on March 2, 2019.

In 2020, Navarro was named by Carnegie Corporation of New York as an honoree of the Great Immigrants Award.

In 2023, Navarro posted on Twitter, "Years ago, I had an ectopic pregnancy. Anyone who's had to terminate a pregnancy, specially for health reasons, can tell you a woman wants the safety of her bed, her pillow to cry on, her loved ones to lean on", in reply to the Texas Supreme Court temporarily blocking a judge's decision to allow an emergency abortion for a woman experiencing a high-risk pregnancy and carrying an unviable fetus with trisomy 18; Navarro also called the Texas Supreme Court's ruling "wrong".
