= Andrés Oppenheimer =

Argentinian journalist

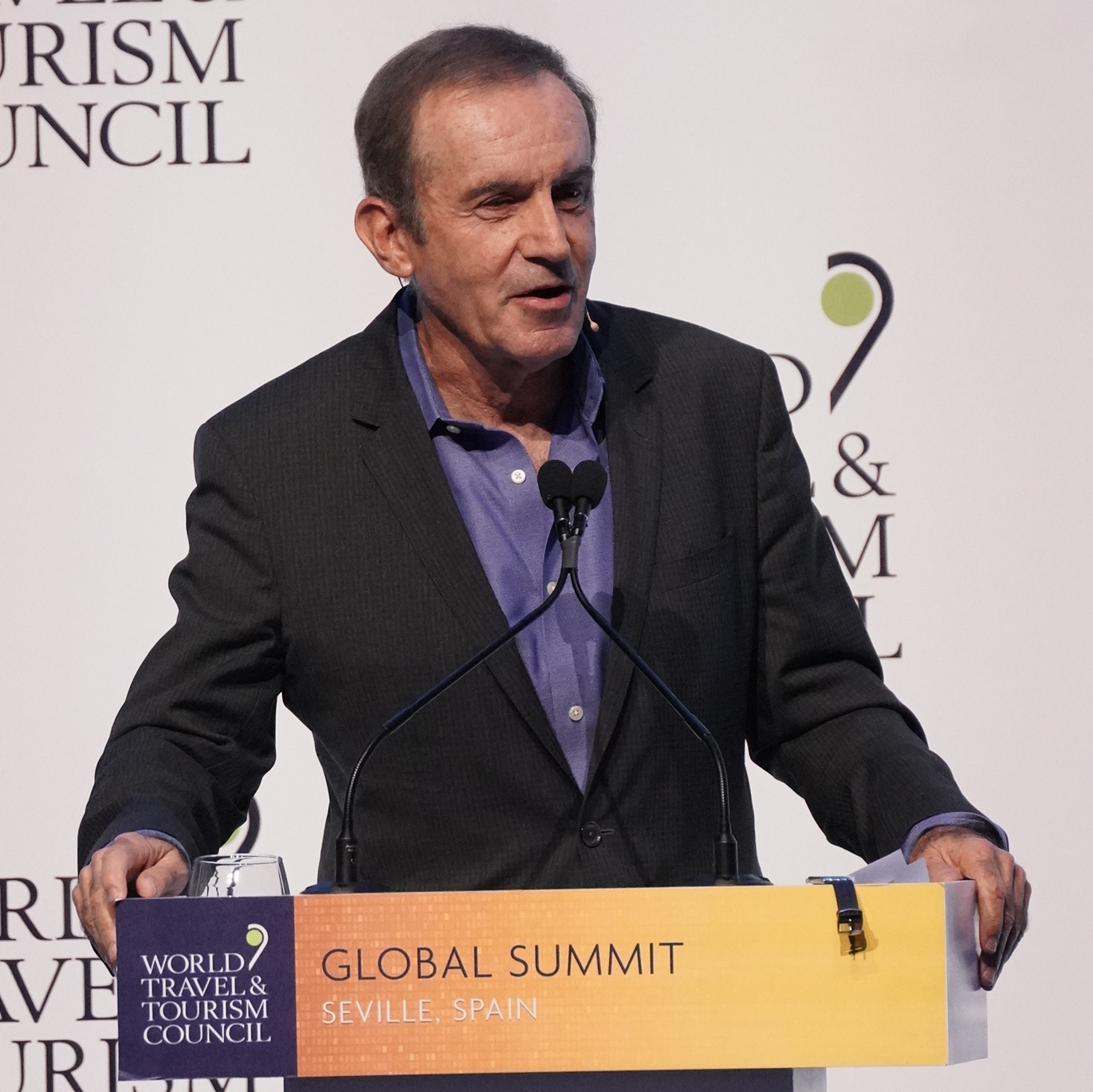
- Born: Buenos Aires, Argentina
- Education: Columbia University
- Occupation: Journalist
- Organization: The Miami Herald

Andrés Oppenheimer (born in Buenos Aires), named by Foreign Policy en Español magazine as “one of the 50 most influential Latin American intellectuals,” is the author of several bestsellers on international affairs, innovation, technology, and education. He hosts the television show “Oppenheimer Presenta” on CNN en Español and on his YouTube channel “Oppenheimer Presenta,” and is a columnist for several leading newspapers in the Americas.

His most recent books include “Cómo salir del pozo” (2023), about new strategies that countries, companies, and people are using in their search for greater happiness and life satisfaction; “The Robots Are Coming!” (2018), on the future of work in the age of robots and smart computers; “Create or Die!” (2014), on the secrets of the world's most successful innovators; “Saving the Americas” (2007), on the future of Latin America in a world led by the United States and China; and “Bordering on Chaos” (1998), about Mexico's Zapatista rebellion and the country's transition to democracy. His works have been published in Spanish, English, Portuguese, Chinese, Korean, and Japanese.

His columns appear regularly in leading newspapers across the region, including La Nación (Argentina), O Estado de S. Paulo (Brazil), El Mercurio (Chile), El Comercio (Peru), Reforma (Mexico), and El Norte (Mexico).

Oppenheimer was co-winner of the Pulitzer Prize in 1987 as a member of The Miami Herald team that exposed the Iran-Contra scandal. He also received several of the most prestigious awards in Spanish-language journalism, including the Ortega y Gasset Award from the Spanish newspaper El País (1993) and Spain's King of Spain Award, presented by the EFE news agency (2001). He also won Columbia University's Maria Moors Cabot Prize (1998), the Overseas Press Club Award (2002), and a Suncoast Emmy from the U.S. National Academy of Television Arts and Sciences (2005).

Born in Buenos Aires, he began his studies at the University of Buenos Aires and moved to the United States in 1976 on a World Press Institute scholarship to continue his education at Macalester College in St. Paul, Minnesota. In 1978, he earned a master's degree in journalism from Columbia University in New York. He has received honorary doctorates from Galileo University (Guatemala), Domingo Savio University (Bolivia), ESAN University (Peru), and Siglo 21 University (Argentina).

He has served as Latin America editor, columnist, and bureau chief for The Miami Herald in Mexico, Colombia, and Central America. Earlier, he worked at The Associated Press in New York and has contributed to The New York Times, The Washington Post, The New Republic, CBS News, and the BBC. Over the course of his career, he has interviewed, among others, Donald Trump, Barack Obama, Hugo Chávez, Daniel Ortega, Bill Gates, and dozens of Latin American presidents, Nobel Prize winners, and business leaders.

He was named one of the 100 most powerful figures in Latin America by Poder magazine (2002) and one of the 500 most influential journalists in the United States by Forbes Media Guide (1993). The French newspaper Le Monde wrote that Oppenheimer “occupies a unique place in the Americas’ press,” noting that his work “sets the agenda for political debate” in the region (2003).

== Bibliography ==
- Castro's Final Hour: The Secret Story Behind the Coming Downfall of Communist Cuba (1992)
- Bordering on Chaos: Guerrillas, Stockholders, Politicians and Mexico's Road to Prosperity (1996)
- Crónicas de héroes y bandidos (1998)
- Ojos vendados: Estados Unidos y el negocio de la corrupción en América Latina (2001)
- Cuentos chinos: El engaño de Washington, la mentira populista y la esperanza de América Latina (2005)
- Saving the Americas: The Dangerous Decline of Latin America and What the U.S. Must Do (2009)
- Basta de historias!: La obsesión latinoamericana con el pasado y las doce claves del futuro (2010)
- Crear o Morir: La Esperanza de América Latina y las 5 Claves de la Innovación (2014)
- ¡Sálvese Quien Pueda!: El futuro del trabajo en la era de la automatización (2018)
- ¡Cómo Salir del Pozo!: las nuevas estrategias de los países, las empresas y las personas en busca de la felicidad (2023)
