= Geovanny Vicente =

Dominican political strategist

Geovanny Vicente-Romero
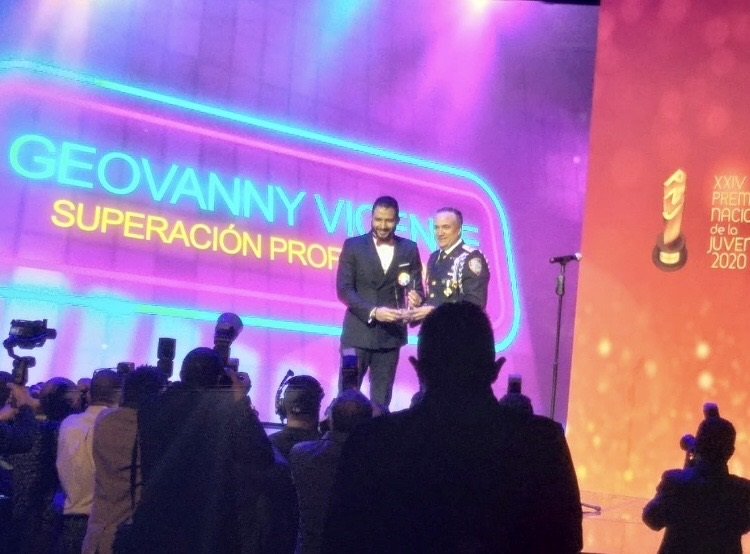

Chief Advisor in Strategic Communications of the Inter-American Institute of Justice and Sustainability (IIJS)
- Incumbent
- Assumed office June 2020

Acting Director of Civil Service of the Dominican Republic at the Ministry of Public Administration
- In office June 2014 – August 2014

Personal details
- Born: Geovanny Antonio Vicente Romero; 21 August 1986 (age 40) Padre Las Casas, Dominican Republic
- Spouse: Jennifer Miel
- Children: Marvin Alejandro Vicente Miel
- Parent(s): Marino Vicente Rosado and Digna Romero Céspedes
- Education: George Washington University; Universidad de Murcia; Universidad Autonoma de Santo Domingo; Columbia University (MA)
- Occupation: Political strategist, Columbia University professor, CNN columnist, writer, author, political commentator
- Awards: The Political Column of The Year Award (Napolitan Victory Awards); National Youth Award; Honorary Ambassador and Adopted Son Appointed by Azua, Dominican Republic; 2022 Global Top 100 Most Influential People of African Descent (MIPAD - New York) - Politics & Governance (Class of 2022)
- Website: geovannyvicente.com

Geovanny Vicente-Romero is a Dominican political strategist, lawyer, columnist, international consultant and university professor who teaches strategic communications at Columbia University as an associate lecturer. He specializes in public policy and public administration, and has several years of experience in the public sector, academics, and journalism. He writes a weekly column for CNN as a political analyst.

== Early life and education ==
Geovanny Antonio Vicente Romero was born in Padre Las Casas (Azua) in 1986 to a family of lawyers. His father, Marino Vicente Rosado has been working as judge for over 20 years (and he is still in office), and his mother, Digna Romero is also a lawyer, who served as an interim judge. He spent his childhood and university years in Dominican Republic, and after that he spent, a few years of working there. Geovanny Vicente moved to the US in 2013 and has been working there since then.

Vicente Romero holds a bachelor's degree in law and public policy from the Universidad Autónoma de Santo Domingo (2009). He obtained a master's degree in criminology and prisons (2011) from the University of Murcia, in Spain. He went to the George Washington University to get a master's degree in Political Communication and Strategic Governance from the Political Management School. In 2025, Geovanny successfully defended his doctoral dissertation, "Communication Based on Political Incorrectness: The Case of Donald Trump During His First Presidency (2017–2021)" at the University of Murcia. His thesis and dissertation received the highest distinction, unanimously awarded by the examining committee of the PhD program in Political Science and Public Administration: "Outstanding, Cum Laude."

== Career ==
As a political analyst, Geovanny regularly appears on leading international news outlets including CNN, The Washington Post, Washington Examiner, Newsweek, HuffPost, The Jerusalem Post, BBC's World Business Report, Infobae, and Mundo Hispánico, in both Spanish and English, about the United States, Latin America, and Europe. He has been a strong advocate of climate change remedies and the importance of developing sustainability Also, Vicente Romero writes a column in CNN, Infobae, El Diario La Prensa, La Opinión, El Nuevo Día, La Prensa Gráfica and El Telégrafo.

He has been a featured writer for the Inter-American Development Bank (IDB) and international news agencies such as Mexico's El Universal, among others. He worked for the Ministry of Public Administration of the Dominican Republic as public policy analyst going on to become the interim Director of the Dominican civil service for a couple of months.

Vicente Romero also taught two law classes per semester at Universidad Central del Este for 5 years. He is the founder of the Center for Public Policy, Development, and Leadership of the Dominican Republic (CPDL-RD), and the recipient of the Dominican Republic's Provincial Youth Award in Professional Leadership granted by the Dominican Presidency and Ministry of Youth. Romero also received the Robert E. Lesher scholarship granted by Carlos Rosario International Public Charter School, in Washington, D.C., in 2017.

=== Democracy and elections ===
Geovanny has worked in partnership with New York University through the DC Dialogues series, an academic initiative that addresses topics such as development, business, governance and democracy. During these discussions, Geovanny has moderated dialogues with the Secretary General of the Organization of American States Luis Almagro, The Dominican Republic's President Luis Abinader, Costa Rica's President Carlos Alvarado, Colombia's former President Alvaro Uribe, El Salvador's Vice-president Felix Ulloa, Woodrow Wilson International Center for Scholars's Latin American Program Director Dr. Cynthia J. Arnson, National Endowment for Democracy's Director for Latin America and the Caribbean Miriam Kornblith, Inter-American Dialogue's President Michael Shifter, Puerto Rican Mayor María Meléndez, among others.

Vicente Romero has worked as an international election observer. He was one of the observers during the launch of the first sample-based election monitoring in the United States, Observe D.C., an initiative of Georgetown University that came out during the mid-term elections of 2018. He has observed elections in the United States, El Salvador, Dominican Republic, among other countries. In February 2019, he observed the presidential election in El Salvador through the electoral observation mission of the Organization of American States.

=== Civil society experience ===
Founder and Chairperson of the Center of Public Policy, Leadership and Development (since its inception in Santo Domingo in 2013), a non-profit, non-governmental organization. This is a think tank, based in the Dominican Republic, that promotes strong institutions and democracy by generating policy research, promoting ideas, and fostering discussion between the public and policymakers. Since 2014, the center has been invited by the Organization of American States (OAS) to represent the Dominican Republic's civil society in the National Consultation with Civil Society and Social Actors in occasion of the Summit of the Americas.

On 6 July 2019, the City Council of Azua de Compostela and its Mayor Rafael Hidalgo awarded Geovanny Vicente Romero the honor of "Hijo Adoptivo de la Ciudad de Azua" (Adopted Son of Azua City) through the resolution No. 19-2019. On 10 July 2019, the Dominican Federation of Municipalities (FEDOMU) recognized Vicente Romero for his contributions to the Dominican Republic's municipalities as well as for his leading role in the international public opinion.

=== Analysis of the Odebrecht Scandal ===
As the investigations proceed, more and more evidence comes to light, and it looks like Odebrecht (Latin America's largest construction firm) created the largest bribery ring in history. After Operation Car Wash ended with the court sentencing Marcelo Odebrecht to 19 years in prison, several Latin American countries opened their own investigations. In the Dominican Republic, former congressman, Manual Manuel Jiménez filed an official complaint in February 2017. He partially based his file on Geovanny Vicente Romero's article about the Odebrecht case, which also served as evidence in the lawsuit. In his article, Vicente Romero claims that the Dominican Republic received the second largest bribe from Odebrech (after Venezuela). As prosecutors throughout Latin America started to investigate the Odebrecht bribes seriously, top-ranking officials, businessmen and even presidents seem to have been involved: Peru, for example ordered the arrest of the former president Alejandro Toledo. As a conclusion of the investigation in the Dominican Republic, nearly a dozen people were arrested on 29 May 2017.

== Personal life ==
Vicente Romero married Jennifer Miel, executive director, U.S.-Bahrain Business Council and U.S.-Turkey Business Council, on 25 August 2019. The couple has a son, Marvin Alejandro Vicente Miel, born in 2020.

=== Publications ===
Geovanny Vicente Romero is co-author of several books on political communication, governance and democracy.

- "Participatory Budgeting Within the Framework of Open Government: Dominican Republic as a Case Study". (2022). In Christophe Premat (Ed.), Direct Democracy Practices at the Local Level. IGI Global – Stockholm University, Sweden. ISBN 978-1-7998-7304-4. Collective work.
- "Liderazgo político e integración regional frente al cambio climático: un desafío que amenaza el futuro de América Central y el Caribe". (2021). In Diego Echegoyen Rivera (Ed), La Región que viene: Miradas sobre Centroamérica. San Salvador – El País Que Viene Initiative, The Central American Integration System (SICA). EXOR Latam CA. ISBN 978-99961-87-09-4. Collective work.
- "Giving Back When Most in Need". In L. J. Pentón Herrera & E. T. Trịnh (eds.), Critical Storytelling: Multilingual Immigrants in the United States. Sense Publishers. 2020. ISBN 978-90-04-44618-2.
- "Caso República Dominicana". Universo COMPOL: Universo de la Comunicación Política (1ª edición). Buenos Aires - Editorial EPYCA. 2020. ISBN 978-987-86-4728-9. Nadia Brizuela. Collective work.

Vicente Romero is currently working on two books; one about the political and economic future of the Central American region, and the other about the American Dream's myths and realities from the vantage point of Latinos in the USA.

=== Awards and achievements ===
- Named a Voice of a New Era of Leaders in Vienna, Austria, as part of the Leadership Redefined global movement led by femalefactor.global, a global community for a new era of female leaders enabling them to get their seat at the table.
- Selected as a member of the Class of 2023 for the FBI Citizens Academy Program in Washington, DC, an intensive program providing direct insight into federal law enforcement operations, national security, and investigative processes.
- Named to Leaders of Color Class of 2023, alongside 60 leaders in Louisiana, Memphis, and Washington, D.C.
- Recognized as one of the G100 He-For-She Champions and invited to join this group as Advisory Member, Global Advisory Council (The Denim Club), in 2022.
- Selected as 2022 Global Top 100 Most Influential People of African Descent (MIPAD - New York) - Politics & Governance (Class of 2022)
- Recipient of the Napolitan Victory Awards (The Political Column of The Year Award), granted by The Washington Academy of Political Arts & Sciences™, 2021.
- Named a hero of his community in the "COVID-19 Hispanic Heroes" list (2020) of El Tiempo Latino, the Spanish-language newspaper with the highest circulation in the DMV area (Washington, D.C., Maryland and Virginia). Other leaders on this list include Muriel Bowser, Mayor of the City of Washington D.C. This recognition was granted during the "Hispanic Heritage Month" that is celebrated in the United States, from September to October.
- National Youth Award given by the Dominican Presidency for Professional Excellence: 2020
- Nominated for The Political Column of The Year Award, granted by The Washington Academy of Political Arts & Sciences™, 2019 and 2020.
- Honored with the title of "Hijo Adoptivo de la Ciudad de Azua" (Adopted Son of Azua City) by its City Council and Mayor Rafael Hidalgo.
- Recognized for his contributions to the Dominican Republic's municipalities by the Dominican Federation of Municipalities (FEDOMU).
- Selected as one of the Hundred Most Influential Political Professionals of 2018 by the Washington COMPOL Magazine.
- Robert E. Lesher/Carlos Rosario Scholarship recipient in 2017.
- Global Language Network Teaching Fellow in 2015 and 2016.
- Named one of the leading Dominican Young Professionals by the Ministry of Youth in 2015.

=== Boards, committees and affiliations ===
- Advisory Member, Global Advisory Council (The Denim Club), in 2022.
- Member of the Board of Directors of Outreach360, 2020-2021. Outreach360 is an NGO based in Arizona with offices in Nicaragua and the Dominican Republic, providing enhanced educational opportunities to youth living in Latin America through a world-class service-learning program.
- Member (judge) of the selection committee for Washington's El Tiempo Latino Powermeter, 2019. This is a unique sought-after list of the 100 most influential people for the Nation's Capital Metro Area Latinos.
- Fellow, Global Language Network, 2015–present, where he teaches Spanish and Latin American culture.
- Member of the Organization of American States's National Hubs Anticorruption for the Dominican Republic, since 2014.
