= List of people from Mississippi =

State flag of Mississippi

Location of Mississippi in the United States

This list contains people who were born or lived in the U.S. state of Mississippi.

== Activists and advocates ==
- Ruby Bridges (born 1954), first African-American child to attend an all-white school in the South (Tylertown)
- Will D. Campbell (1924–2013), Baptist minister and activist (Amite County)
- James Chaney (1943–1964), civil rights activist (Meridian)
- Vernon Dahmer (1908–1966), civil rights activist (Hattiesburg)
- Charles Evers (1922–2020), civil rights leader, mayor of Fayette (Decatur)
- Medgar Evers (1925–1963), civil rights leader (Decatur)
- Myrlie Evers-Williams (born 1933), civil rights activist, journalist (Vicksburg)
- C. L. Franklin (1915–1984), Baptist minister, father of Aretha Franklin (Shelby)
- Lloyd L. Gaines (1911–1939?), challenged segregation at University of Missouri School of Law, disappeared in 1939 (Water Valley)
- Duncan M. Gray Jr. (1926–2016), Episcopal clergyman, civil rights activist (Canton)
- Winifred Green (1937–2016), civil rights activist (Jackson)
- Percy Greene (1897–1977), journalist, activist (Jackson)
- Lawrence Guyot (1939–2012), civil rights activist (Pass Christian)
- Fannie Lou Hamer (1917–1977), civil rights, voting rights activist (Ruleville)
- Winson Hudson (1916–2004), civil rights activist (Harmony)
- Clyde Kennard (1927–1963), civil rights activist (Hattiesburg)
- Germany Kent (born 1975), journalist, social activist (Greenville)
- Edwin King (born 1936), civil rights activist, Tougaloo College chaplain (Jackson)
- Joyce Ann Ladner (born 1943), civil rights activist and educator (Wayne County)
- Tommie Mabry (b. 1987), author, and activist for impoverished youth (Jackson)
- Angela McGlowan (born 1970), Republican political commentator, author, and consulting firm CEO
- James Meredith (born 1933), first African-American student at the University of Mississippi (Kosciusko)
- Anne Moody (1940–2015), civil rights activist, author (Centreville)
- Ida B. Wells-Barnett (1862–1931), civil rights activist, women's rights activist (Holly Springs)

== Actors and actresses ==
- Mary Alice (1941–2022), actress (Indianola)
- Dana Andrews (1909–1992), actor (Covington County)
- Fred Armisen (born 1966), actor, comedian, and musician (Hattiesburg)
- Roscoe Ates (1895–1962), actor and musician (Grange)
- Katherine Bailess (born 1980), film and television actress (Vicksburg)
- Laura Bailey (born 1981), voice actress (Biloxi)
- Earl W. Bascom (1906–1995), actor (Columbia)
- Willie Best (1916–1962), television and film actor (Sunflower)
- Jimmy Boyd (1939–2009), singer and actor (McComb)
- Don Briscoe (1940–2004), soap opera actor (Yalobusha County)
- Geneva Carr (born 1971), television and stage actress (Jackson)
- Finn Carter (born 1960), actress (Greenville)
- Wally Cassell (1912–2015), film and television actor
- Lacey Chabert (born 1982), film and television actress (Purvis)
- Alvin Childress (1907–1986), actor (Meridian)
- Gary Collins (1938–2012), film and television actor (Biloxi)
- Wyatt Emory Cooper (1927–1978), Broadway actor (Quitman)
- Cassi Davis (born 1964) (Holly Springs)
- John Dye (1963–2011), film and television actor (Amory)
- Mary Elizabeth Ellis (born 1979), television and film actress (Laurel)
- J. D. Evermore (born 1968), film and television actor (Greenville)
- Ruth Ford (1911–2009), stage and film actress (Brookhaven)
- Morgan Freeman (born 1937), Academy Award-winning actor (Charleston)
- M. C. Gainey (born 1948), film and television actor (Jackson)
- Cynthia Geary (born 1965), actress (Jackson)
- Gavin Gordon (1901–1983), film, television, and radio actor (Chicora)
- Allie Grant (born 1994), actress (Tupelo)
- Gary Grubbs (born 1949) (Amory)
- Lynn Hamilton (born 1930), actress (Yazoo City)
- Beth Henley (born 1952), playwright and actress (Jackson)
- Jim Henson (1936–1990), creator of The Muppets (Greenville)
- Anthony Herrera (1944–2011) (Wiggins)
- Wilbur Higby (1867–1934), silent film actor (Meridian)
- Shauntay Hinton (born 1979), actress and Miss USA 2002 (Starkville)
- Eddie Hodges (born 1947), child actor (Hattiesburg)
- Olivia Holt (born 1997), actress (Nesbit)
- Thelma Houston (born 1943), actress (Leland)
- James Earl Jones (1931–2024), actor (Arkabutla)
- Robert Earl Jones (1910–2006), actor (Senatobia)
- Germany Kent (born 1975), actress (Greenville)
- Simbi Khali (born 1971) (Jackson)
- Diane Ladd (born 1935), actress (Meridian)
- Daniel Curtis Lee (born 1991) (Clinton)
- Tom Lester (1938–2020) (Jackson)
- Martha Mattox (1879–1933), silent film actor (Natchez)
- Shane McRae (born 1977) (Starkville)
- Gerald McRaney (born 1947), actor (Collins)
- RJ Mitte (1992–2026), Breaking Bad actor (Jackson)
- Carrie Nye (1936–2006), soap opera and stage actress (Greenwood)
- Gil Peterson (born 1936), actor (Winona)
- Evelyn Preer (1896–1932) (Vicksburg)
- Thalmus Rasulala (1939–1991), actor (Arkabutla)
- Beah Richards (1920–2000), stage, screen and television actress (Vicksburg)
- Eric Roberts (born 1956), actor (Biloxi)
- Toni Seawright (born 1964), actress (Pascagoula)
- Larry Semon (1889–1928), silent film actor, director, producer (West Point)
- Jamie Lynn Spears (born 1991), actress, singer (McComb)
- Taylor Spreitler (born 1993), actress, model (Wiggins)
- Stella Stevens (1938–2023), actress (Yazoo City)
- Tonea Stewart (born 1947) (Greenwood)
- Trinitee Stokes (born 2006), actress (Jackson)
- Byron Thames (born 1969), actor (Jackson)
- Joe M. Turner (born 1969), actor, magician, professional speaker (Brandon)
- James Michael Tyler (born 1962) (Winona)
- Brenda Venus (born 1957), actress (Biloxi)
- Ray Walston (1914–2001), actor (Laurel)
- Sela Ward (born 1956), actress (Meridian)
- James Wheaton (1924–2002) (Meridian)
- Kit Williamson (born 1985), actor (Jackson)
- Hattie Winston (born 1945), actress (Greenville)

== Artists ==
- Jere Allen (born 1944), painter (Oxford)
- James McConnell Anderson (1907–1998), potter and painter (Ocean Springs)
- Peter Anderson (1901–1984), potter (Ocean Springs)
- Walter Inglis Anderson (1903–1965), painter (Ocean Springs)
- Earl W. Bascom (1906–1995), painter, sculptor, "King of the Cowboy Artists" (Columbia)
- Howard Bingham (1939–2016), photographer (Jackson)
- Marshall Bouldin III (1923–2012), portrait painter (Clarksdale)
- Andrew Bucci (1922–2014), painter (Vicksburg)
- Byron Burford (1920–2011), painter (Greenville)
- William Dunlap (born 1944), painter (Webster County)
- Sam Gilliam (1933–2022), color field painter (Tupelo)
- Theora Hamblett (1895–1977), painter (Oxford)
- Ted Jackson (born 1956), photojournalist (McComb)
- Chris LeDoux (1948–2005), bronze sculptor (Biloxi)
- Alex M. Loeb (1918–2015), painter (Meridian)
- John McCrady (1911–1968), painter, printmaker (Canton)
- Ed McGowin (born 1938), sculptor, painter (Hattiesburg)
- Joshua Meador (1911–1965), animator, artist (Greenwood)
- Fred Mitchell (1923–2013), abstract expressionist painter (Meridian)
- Ethel Wright Mohamed (1906–1992), folk stitchery artist (Belzoni)
- George E. Ohr (1857–1918), potter (Biloxi)
- James Seawright (1936–2022), sculptor (Jackson)
- J. Kim Sessums, bronze sculptor, painter (Brookhaven)
- Floyd Shaman (1935–2005), sculptor (Cleveland)
- Glennray Tutor (born 1950), painter (Oxford)
- Gary Walters (born 1941), painter (Jackson)
- James W. Washington Jr. (1908–2000), painter, sculptor (Gloster)
- Dick Waterman (1935–2024), photographer and blues promoter (Oxford)

== Broadcast media personalities ==
- Paul Gallo (born 1947), radio host (Shaw)
- Lee Habeeb (born 1961), conservative talk radio producer (Oxford)
- Iris Kelso (1926–2003), newspaper journalist and television commentator in New Orleans (Philadelphia)
- Germany Kent (born 1975), media personality, author (Greenville)
- Angela McGlowan (born 1970), Fox News political commentator (Oxford)
- Randall Pinkston (born 1950), newscaster (Yazoo County)
- Robin Roberts (born 1960), newscaster (Pass Christian)
- Norman Robinson (born 1951), news anchor (Toomsuba)
- Tavis Smiley (born 1964), talk show host (Gulfport)
- Shepard Smith (born 1964), Fox News anchor (Holly Springs)
- Paula White (born 1966), televangelist, author (Tupelo)
- Oprah Winfrey (born 1954), talk show host (Kosciusko)

== Comedians ==
- Rod Brasfield (1910–1958) (Smithville)
- Jerry Clower (1926–1998) (Liberty)
- Tommy Davidson (born 1963), stand-up comedian, most notable for time on In Living Color (Rolling Fork)
- Karlous Miller (born 1983), stand-up comedian (Oxford)
- Tig Notaro (born 1971), stand-up comedian (Jackson)
- Cardis Cardell Willis (1937–2007), stand-up comedian (Forest)

== Educators ==
- Thea Bowman (1937–1990), Roman Catholic religious sister, teacher, and scholar (Yazoo County)
- James Madison Carpenter (1888–1983), folklorist (Prentiss County)
- Richard Carson (born 1955), professor of economics (Jackson)
- Joseph Crespino (born 1972), political scientist (Macon)
- Jesse Dukeminier (1925–2003), professor of law (West Point)
- William R. Ferris (born 1942), folklorist, chairman of National Endowment for the Humanities (Vicksburg)
- Charles Betts Galloway (1849–1909), Methodist bishop, editor (Kosciusko)
- Edgar Godbold (1879–1952), college president (Lincoln County)
- George W. Grace (1921–2015), linguist (Corinth)
- William Baskerville Hamilton (1908–1972), historian, born in Jackson, taught public school in Holly Springs and Jackson
- Robert Khayat (born 1938), chancellor of the University of Mississippi (Moss Point)
- Rory Lee (born 1949), clergyman, college president (Ridgeland)
- Mamie Locke (born 1954), political scientist, dean at Hampton University (Brandon)
- John A. Lomax (1867–1948), folklorist (Goodman)
- Frances Lucas (born 1957), president of Millsaps College (Jackson)
- Bernie Machen (born 1944), president of University of Florida (Greenwood)
- Walter E. Massey (born 1938), physicist, University of Chicago (Hattiesburg)
- William H. Miller (born 1941), theoretical chemist (Kosciusko)
- William Muse (born 1939), chancellor at East Carolina University
- Rod Paige (1933–2025), U.S. secretary of education (Monticello)
- Milburn Price (born 1938), hymnologist, dean of School of Performing Arts, Samford University (Electric Mills)
- Dan Reneau (born 1940), president of Louisiana Tech University (Woodville)
- Argile Smith (born 1955), clergyman and educator (Poplarville)
- Louis Westerfield (1949–1996), law professor, first African-American dean of the University of Mississippi School of Law (De Kalb)
- Fannie C. Williams (1882–1980), normal school educator (Biloxi)

== Entrepreneurs and business leaders ==
- Jim Barksdale (born 1943), president and CEO of Netscape (Jackson)
- Joseph A. Biedenharn (1866–1952), confectioner, first Coca-Cola bottler (Vicksburg)
- George W. Bryan (1944–2023), Sara Lee executive (West Point)
- John H. Bryan (1936–2018), Sara Lee executive (West Point)
- Bill Bynum, credit union founder and philanthropist
- Cynthia Cooper, WorldCom vice president, whistleblower (Clinton)
- Bernard "Bernie" Ebbers (1941–2020), founder and CEO of WorldCom, convicted of fraud and conspiracy (Brookhaven)
- Joshua Green (1869–1975), shipping magnate, banker (Jackson)
- Toxey Haas (born 1960), founder and CEO of Haas Outdoors, Inc. (West Point)
- Robert L. Johnson (born 1946), founder of Black Entertainment Television (Hickory)
- Ken Lewis (born 1947), Bank of America executive (Meridian)
- Matteo Martinolich (1860–1934), master shipbuilder (DeLisle)
- Walter E. Massey (born 1938), corporate executive (Hattiesburg)
- Glenn McCullough (born 1954), chairman and CEO of GLM Associates, LLC (Tupelo)
- Charles Moorman (born 1952), CEO of Norfolk Southern (Hattiesburg)
- Clarence Otis Jr. (born 1956), CEO of Darden Restaurants (Vicksburg)
- Hartley Peavey (born 1941), founder of Peavey Electronics (Meridian)
- Pig Foot Mary (1870–1929), culinary entrepreneur (Mississippi Delta)
- Robert Pittman (born 1953), founder of MTV, executive at AOL (Jackson)
- J. H. Rush (1868–1931), founder of Rush's Infirmary (De Kalb)
- Fred Smith (born 1944), founder of FedEx (Marks)
- James Breckenridge Speed (1844–1912), industrial pioneer
- Antonio Maceo Walker (1909–1994), president, Universal Life Insurance Company (Indianola)
- Zig Ziglar (1926–2012), motivational speaker, author, salesman (Yazoo City)

== Explorers ==
- Moncacht-Apé, Native American explorer of the Yazoo tribe; in the late 1600s or early 1700s, reported to have made the first recorded round-trip transcontinental journey across North America

== Filmmakers ==
- Charles Burnett (born 1944), film director and producer (Vicksburg)
- Jamaa Fanaka (1942–2012), film director (Jackson)
- John Fortenberry, film and television director (Jackson)
- Lawrence Gordon (born 1936), film producer, Die Hard (Yazoo City)
- Jonathan Murray (born 1955), creator of the reality television genre (Gulfport)
- Patrik-Ian Polk (born 1973), film writer and director (Hattiesburg)
- Bryan Spears (born 1977), film and television producer (McComb)
- Tate Taylor (born 1969), film director of The Help and Get On Up (Jackson)
- Larry A. Thompson (born 1944), television and film producer (Clarksdale)

== Jurists and lawyers ==
- Rhesa Barksdale (born 1944), federal judge (Jackson)
- Neal Brooks Biggers Jr. (1935–2023), U.S. district judge (Corinth)
- William Joel Blass (1917–2012), attorney (Wiggins/Gulfport)
- Debra M. Brown (born 1963), U.S. district judge (Yazoo City)
- Gerald Chatham (1906–1956), lawyer, lead prosecutor in the Emmett Till case (Hernando)
- Bobby DeLaughter (born 1954), prosecutor, judge (Jackson)
- Jess H. Dickinson (born 1947), associate justice, Supreme Court of Mississippi (Charleston)
- Boyce Holleman (1924–2003), attorney (Wiggins/Gulfport)
- Perry Wilbon Howard (1877–1961), assistant U.S. attorney general, Republican leader (Ebenezer)
- Lucy Somerville Howorth (1895–1997), attorney, judge, state legislator (Greenville)
- E. Grady Jolly (1937–2026), judge of the U.S. Fifth Circuit Court of Appeals (Louisville)
- W. Allen Pepper Jr. (1941–2012), U.S. district judge (Greenwood)
- Charles W. Pickering (born 1937), U.S. district judge (Jones County)
- Thomas Rodney (1744–1811), U.S. territorial judge (Natchez)
- Richard "Dickie" Scruggs (born 1946), attorney (Pascagoula)
- Constance Slaughter-Harvey (born 1946), judge and attorney (Forest)
- Michael B. Thornton (born 1954), judge, U.S. Tax Court (Hattiesburg)
- Michael Wallace (born 1951), lawyer (Biloxi)
- James R. Williams (1936–2020), lawyer, U.S. attorney (Columbus)

== Military figures ==
- William Wirt Adams (1819–1888), brigadier general, CSA (Jackson)
- Van T. Barfoot (1919–2012), World War II colonel and Medal of Honor recipient (Edinburg)
- William Barksdale (1821–1863), brigadier general, CSA, died at Gettysburg (Jackson)
- William Billingsley (1887–1913), ensign, first Navy aviator killed in an airplane crash (Winona)
- Oliver Bosbyshell (1839–1921), superintendent of the United States Mint (Vicksburg)
- Alvin C. Cockrell (1918–1942), second lieutenant, USMC, killed in World War II (Hazelhurst)
- Fox Conner (1874–1951), major general, U.S. Army, mentor to Dwight Eisenhower (Slate Springs)
- Nathan Bedford Forrest (1821–1877), general, CSA (Hernando)
- Jeffery Hammond (born 1978), major general, U.S. Army (Hattiesburg)
- Randolph M. Holder (1918–1942), USN lieutenant (junior grade) (Jackson)
- Felix Huston (1800–1857), general, Texas army (Natchez)
- Samuel Reeves Keesler (1896–1918), Army aviator (Greenwood)
- Newt Knight (1837–1922), Unionist leader (Jones County)
- Roy Joseph Marchand (1920–1942), World War II fireman first class (Crandall)
- Henry Pinckney McCain (1861–1941), adjutant general, US Army (Carroll County)
- John S. McCain Sr. (1884–1945), USN admiral (Teoc)
- Donald H. Peterson (1933–2018), USAF colonel and NASA astronaut (Winona)
- Charles Read (1840–1890), naval officer (Meridian)
- Viola B. Sanders (1921–2013), USN captain, director of women, U.S. Navy (Sidon)
- Daniel Isom Sultan (1885–1947), inspector general, U.S. Army (Oxford)
- James Monroe Trotter (1842–1892), first man of color to achieve rank of 2nd Lieutenant, U.S. Army, music historian (Gulfport)
- Richard H. Truly (1937–2024), USN vice-admiral, astronaut, NASA administrator (Fayette)
- Louis H. Wilson Jr. (1920–2005), commandant of the Marine Corps and Medal of Honor recipient (Brandon)

== Models/pageant winners ==
- Jennifer Adcock (born 1980), Miss Mississippi 2002 and Miss Mississippi USA 2005 (Hattiesburg)
- Kristi Addis (born 1971), Miss Teen USA 1987 (Holcomb)
- Susan Akin (born 1965), Miss Mississippi 1985 and Miss America 1986 (Meridian)
- Asya Branch (born 1998), Miss Mississippi 2018, Miss Mississippi USA 2019, and Miss USA 2020 (Booneville)
- Jenna Edwards (born 1981), former Miss Florida and Miss Florida USA (Brandon)
- Ruth Ford (1911–2009), model (Hazlehurst)
- Taryn Foshee (born 1985), Miss Mississippi 2006 (Clinton)
- Tess Holliday (born 1985), first plus-size model (Laurel)
- Lauren Jones (born 1982), model, Barker's Beauty on The Price is Right, shoe line namesake (Jackson)
- June Juanico (born 1938), beauty queen known for dating Elvis Presley in 1955 and 1956 (Biloxi)
- Nan Kelley (born c. 1965), Miss Mississippi 1985 and GAC's Top 20 Country Countdown hostess (Hattiesburg)
- Kendra King, Miss Mississippi USA 2006 (Monticello)
- Christine Kozlowski (born 1988), Miss Mississippi 2008 (D'Iberville)
- Leah Laviano (born 1988), Miss Mississippi USA 2008, and 1st runner up in Miss USA 2008 (Ellisville)
- Monica Louwerens (born 1973), Miss Mississippi 1995 (Greenville)
- Lypsinka (born 1955), drag performer and model (Hazlehurst)
- Lynda Lee Mead (born 1939), Miss America 1960 (Natchez)
- Mary Ann Mobley (1939–2014), Miss America 1959 (Brandon)
- Jasmine Murray (born 1991), Miss Mississippi 2014, Season 8 finalist on American Idol (Starkville)
- Cheryl Prewitt (born 1957), Miss America 1980 (Ackerman)
- Crystal Renn (born 1986), plus-size model and fashion model (Clinton)
- Hannah Roberts (born 1993), Miss University of Southern Mississippi 2015 (Mount Olive)
- Toni Seawright (born 1964), Miss Mississippi 1987; first African-American winner (Pascagoula)
- Naomi Sims (1948–2009), fashion model and author (Oxford)
- Ellen Stratton (born 1939), model and Playboy Playmate (Marietta)
- Amy Wesson (born 1977), fashion model (Tupelo)
- Cindy Williams (born 1964), journalist and Miss Mississippi USA 1986
- Jalin Wood (born 1981), Miss Mississippi 2004 and Miss Mississippi USA 2007 (Waynesboro)

== Physicians ==
- Henry Cloud (born 1956), clinical psychologist (Vicksburg)
- Thomas F. Frist Sr. (1910–1998), cardiologist, founder of Hospital Corporation of America (Meridian)
- Arthur Guyton (1919–2003), physiologist, author of Textbook of Medical Physiology (Oxford)
- James Hardy (1918–2003), surgeon who performed the first successful cadaveric lung transplant (Jackson)
- T. R. M. Howard (1908–1976), surgeon and activist (Mound Bayou)
- Edgar Hull (1904–1984), co-founder of Medical Center of Louisiana at New Orleans and Louisiana State University Health Sciences Center Shreveport (Pascagoula)
- Thomas Naum James (1925–2010), cardiologist (Amory)

== Politicians ==
- Thomas Abernethy (1903–1998), U.S. representative (Eupora)
- Robert H. Adams (1792–1830), U.S. senator (Natchez)
- James L. Alcorn (1816–1894), governor, U.S. senator (Friars Point)
- William Allain (1928–2013), governor (Washington)
- John Mills Allen (1846–1917), U.S. representative (Tishomingo County)
- Apuckshunubbee (c. 1740–1824), Choctaw chief
- Haley Barbour (born 1947), governor (Yazoo City)
- Ethelbert Barksdale (1824–1893), U.S. representative, Confederate congressman (Jackson)
- William Barksdale (1821–1863), U.S. congressman (Jackson)
- Ross Barnett (1898–1987), governor (Standing Pine)
- Cheri Barry (c. 1955–2023), mayor (Meridian)
- Marion Barry (1936–2014), Washington, D.C. mayor (Itta Bena)
- Theodore G. Bilbo (1877–1947), governor and U.S. senator (Poplarville)
- Marsha Blackburn (born 1952), U.S. representative from Tennessee (Laurel)
- Hale Boggs (1914–1972), U.S. representative from Louisiana, House majority leader (Long Beach)
- Mary Booze (1877–1948), first African-American woman to sit on the Republican National Committee (Mound Bayou)
- David R. Bowen (born 1932), U.S. representative (Houston)
- Walker Brooke (1813–1869), U.S. senator (Vicksburg)
- Blanche Bruce (1841–1898), U.S. senator
- Ezekiel S. Candler Jr. (1862–1944), U.S. representative (Corinth)
- Joseph W. Chalmers (1806–1853), U.S. senator (Holly Springs)
- Travis W. Childers (born 1958), U.S. representative (Booneville)
- John Claiborne (1809–1884), U.S. representative (Natchez)
- Bryant Clark (born 1975), state representative, son of Robert G. Clark Jr. (Jackson)
- Robert G. Clark Jr. (born 1928), state representative, speaker pro tempore (Ebenezer)
- Oliver Clifton (1847–1905), governor (Jackson)
- Thad Cochran (1937–2019), U.S. senator (Pontotoc)
- James P. Coleman (1914–1991), governor (Ackerman)
- Jacqueline Y. Collins (born 1949), Illinois state senator (McComb)
- Ross A. Collins (1880–1968), U.S. representative (Collinsville)
- William M. Colmer (1890–1980), U.S. representative (Moss Point)
- Greg Davis (born 1966), mayor (Southaven)
- Jefferson Davis (1808–1889), U.S. senator and president of the Confederate States (Warren County)
- Oliver E. Diaz Jr. (born 1960), former presiding justice of the Supreme Court of Mississippi (Mississippi)
- Wayne Dowdy (born 1943), chairman of the Mississippi Democratic Party (Magnolia)
- Brad Dye (1933–2018), lieutenant governor (Charleston)
- James Eastland (1904–1986), U.S. senator (Sunflower)
- Ronnie Edwards (1952–2016), Louisiana state representative (Woodville)
- Mike Espy (born 1953), U.S. secretary of agriculture (Yazoo City)
- Robert C. Farrell (born 1936), Los Angeles city councilman (Natchez)
- Erik R. Fleming (born 1965), state representative (Clinton)
- Mary E. Flowers (born 1951), Illinois state representative (Inverness)
- Tim Ford (1951–2015), speaker of Mississippi House of Representatives (Tupelo)
- Kirk Fordice (1934–2004), governor (Vicksburg)
- Webb Franklin (born 1941), U.S. representative (Greenwood)
- Evelyn Gandy (1920–2007), lieutenant governor (Hattiesburg
- James Z. George (1826–1897), U.S. senator (Carrollton)
- Charles H. Griffin (1926–1989), U.S. representative (Utica)
- Gregg Harper (born 1956), U.S. representative (Jackson)
- Pat Harrison (1881–1941), U.S. representative (Crystal Springs)
- Patrick Henry (1843–1930), U.S. representative (Brandon)
- Thomas C. Hindman (1828–1868), U.S. representative from Arkansas (Ripley)
- Jon Hinson (1942–1995), U.S. representative (Tylertown)
- David Holmes (1769–1832), first governor of Mississippi
- Jim Hood (born 1962), attorney general of Mississippi (New Houlka)
- Delbert Hosemann (born 1947), Mississippi secretary of state (Vicksburg)
- Benjamin G. Humphreys (1808–1882), governor (Claiborne County)
- Benjamin G. Humphreys II (1865–1923), U.S. representative (Claiborne County)
- William Y. Humphreys (1890–1933), U.S. representative (Greenville)
- Paul B. Johnson Jr. (1916–1985), governor (Hattiesburg)
- Paul B. Johnson Sr. (1880–1943), judge/governor (Hattiesburg)
- Pete Johnson (born 1948), state auditor, co-chair of Delta Regional Authority (Clarksdale)
- Daryl Jones (born 1955), Florida legislator, attorney (Jackson)
- Penne Percy Korth (born 1942), diplomat (Hattiesburg
- L. Q. C. Lamar (1825–1893), U.S. senator and supreme court justice (Oxford)
- Greenwood LeFlore (1800–1865), Choctaw chief, state senator
- Mamie Locke (born 1954), Virginia state senator (Brandon)
- Trent Lott (born 1941), U.S. senator and Senate Majority Leader (Grenada)
- Chokwe Lumumba (1947–2014), activist, attorney, mayor of Jackson
- John R. Lynch (1847–1939), first African-American speaker of the Mississippi House, U.S. representative (Natchez)
- Ray Mabus (born 1948), governor and Secretary of the Navy (Starkville)
- Lewis McAllister (born 1932), state representative (Meridian)
- Glenn McCullough (born 1954), mayor of Tupelo (Tupelo)
- Chris McDaniel (born 1971), state senator (Laurel)
- Anselm J. McLaurin (1848–1909), governor (Brandon)
- Hernando Money (1839–1912), U.S. senator (Carrollton)
- Frank A. Montgomery (1830–1903), state representative and circuit judge (Adams County)
- Isaiah Montgomery (1847–1924), founder, mayor of Mound Bayou
- Sonny Montgomery (1920–2006), U.S. representative (Meridian)
- Mike Moore (born 1952), Mississippi attorney general (Pascagoula)
- Stanford Morse (1926–2002), state senator (Gulfport)
- Henry L. Muldrow (1837–1905), U.S. representative and First Assistant Secretary of the Interior (Lowndes County)
- Ronnie Musgrove (born 1956), governor (Tocowa)
- David Myers (born 1961), politician, state representative (Magee)
- Spencer Myrick (1918–1991), Louisiana legislator (Simpson County)
- Edmond F. Noel (1856–1927), governor (Lexington)
- Joe Nosef (born 1969), attorney, chairman of Mississippi Republican Party (Clarksdale)
- Alan Nunnelee (1958–2015), state senator (Tupelo)
- Rod Paige (born 1933), U.S. secretary of education (Monticello)
- Rubel Phillips (1925–2011), gubernatorial candidate Corinth
- Chip Pickering (born 1963), U.S. representative (Laurel)
- Stacey Pickering (born 1968), state auditor (Laurel)
- John E. Rankin (1882–1960), U.S. representative (Itawamba County)
- Red Shoes (died 1747), assassinated Choctaw leader
- Clarke Reed (born 1928), state Republican chairman (Greenville)
- Jack Reed (1924–2016), Republican gubernatorial nominee in 1987
- Bill Renick (born 1954), mayor, governor's chief of staff (Ashland)
- Hiram Rhodes Revels (1827–1901), first African-American U.S. senator (Claiborne County)
- Carol Schwartz (born 1944), District of Columbia politician (Greenville)
- Abram M. Scott (1785–1833), governor (Wilkinson County)
- Ronnie Shows (born 1947), U.S. representative (Moselle)
- Jim Singleton (born 1931), New Orleans councilman (Hazlehurst)
- Larkin I. Smith (1944–1989), U.S. representative (Poplarville)
- Larry Speakes (1939–2014), presidential spokesman (Cleveland)
- James J. Spelman (1841–1894), journalist, state representative (Madison County)
- John C. Stennis (1901–1995), U.S. senator (De Kalb)
- Bill Stone (born 1965), state senator (Ashland)
- Tom Stuart (1936–2001), mayor of Meridian
- William V. Sullivan (1857–1918), U.S. representative and senator (Winona)
- Gene Taylor (born 1953), U.S. representative (Bay St. Louis)
- Bennie Thompson (born 1948), U.S. representative (Bolton)
- Jacob Thompson (1810–1885), U.S. representative, secretary of the interior (Oxford)
- W. H. H. Tison (1822–1882), 39th speaker of the Mississippi House of Representatives (Lee County)
- Amy Tuck (born 1963), lieutenant governor (Maben)
- James K. Vardaman (1861–1930), governor, U.S. senator (Yalobusha County)
- Joseph Warren (born 1952), politician, state representative (Magee)
- Jamie L. Whitten (1910–1995), U.S. representative (Cascilla)
- Roger Wicker (born 1951), U.S. senator (Pontotoc)
- Thomas Hickman Williams (1801–1851), U.S. senator (Pontotoc County)
- Norris C. Williamson (1874–1949), Louisiana state senator (Benton County)
- William Arthur Winstead (1904–1995), U.S. representative (Philadelphia)
- William Winter (1923–2020), governor (Grenada)
- Seelig Wise (1913–2004), planter, state senator (Clarksdale)
- Fielding L. Wright (1895–1956), governor (Rolling Fork)

== Scientists and inventors ==
- Earl W. Bascom (1906–1995), inventor of rodeo equipment (Columbia)
- Harry A. Cole (1921–1999), inventor of Pine-Sol (Jackson)
- James A. Ford (1911–1968), archaeologist (Water Valley)
- Fred Haise (born 1933), engineer, astronaut (Biloxi)
- Elizabeth Lee Hazen (1885–1975), microbiologist, developer of nystatin (Rich)
- Martin F. Jue, amateur radio inventor, entrepreneur (Starkville)
- Ben Montgomery (1819–1877), freedman, farmer, inventor (Davis Bend)
- Joseph Newman (1936–2015), inventor of the Newman motor (Lucedale)
- Chester H. Pond (1844–1912), inventor of the electrical self-winding clock
- Henry Sampson (1934–2020), inventor (Jackson)
- Roy A. Tucker (1951–2021), astronomer (Jackson)

== Supercentenarians ==
- Moses Hardy (1894–2006), lived 112 years and 335 days (Aberdeen)
- Bettie Wilson (1890–2006), lived 115 years and 153 days

== Writers ==
- Ace Atkins (born 1970), novelist (Oxford)
- Howard Bahr (born 1946), novelist (Jackson)
- Frederick Barthelme (born 1943), novelist and professor (Hattiesburg)
- Earl W. Bascom (1906–1995), artist and writer (Columbia)
- Lerone Bennett Jr. (1928–2018), editor of Ebony magazine (Clarksdale)
- Douglas A. Blackmon (born 1964), journalist and historian (Leland)
- Maxwell Bodenheim (1892–1954), poet and novelist (Hermanville)
- Margaret Hunt Brisbane (1858–1925), poet (Vicksburg)
- Larry Brown (1951–2004), novelist (Oxford)
- Jack Butler (born 1944), author (Alligator)
- Mary Cain (1904–1984), journalist (Pike County)
- Hodding Carter II (1907–1972), journalist (Greenville)
- Hodding Carter III (1935–2023), journalist (Greenville)
- Craig Claiborne (1920–2000), food writer (Sunflower)
- Carl Corley (1919–2016), author (Florence)
- Cola Barr Craig (1861–1930), author and clubwoman (Jackson)
- Hubert Creekmore (1907–1966), poet, author (Water Valley)
- Mart Crowley (1935–2020), playwright (Vicksburg)
- Borden Deal (1922–1985), novelist and short story writer (Pontotoc)
- Ben Domenech (born 1981), conservative writer and blogger (Jackson)
- David Herbert Donald (1920–2009), historian (Goodman)
- Ellen Douglas (Josephine Haxton) (1921–2012), novelist (Greenville)
- Eliza Ann Dupuy (c. 1814 – 1880), first woman of Mississippi to earn her living as a writer
- John T. Edge (born 1962), food writer (Oxford)
- W. Ralph Eubanks (born 1957), author, journalist (Mount Olive)
- Woody Evans (born 1971?), technology journalist and short story writer (Hattiesburg)
- John Faulkner (1901–1963), plain-style writer (Ripley)
- William Faulkner (1897–1962), Nobel laureate (New Albany)
- William Clark Falkner (1825–1889), businessman, author (Ripley)
- Vic Fleming (born 1951), puzzle writer (Jackson)
- Shelby Foote (1916–2005), historian and novelist (Greenville)
- Charles Henri Ford (1913–2002), poet, novelist, editor (Brookhaven)
- Richard Ford (born 1944), Pulitzer Prize-winning novelist and short story writer (Jackson)
- Lynn Franklin (1922–2005), author, police detective
- Tom Franklin (born 1963), author (Oxford)
- Ellen Gilchrist (1935–2024), novelist, poet, short story writer (Vicksburg)
- John Grisham (born 1955), legal thrillers novelist (Southaven)
- Barry Hannah (1942–2010), novelist and short story writer (Clinton)
- Charlaine Harris (born 1951), mystery author (Tunica)
- Thomas Harris (born 1940), author, screenwriter (Rich)
- Beth Henley (born 1952), playwright and screenwriter (Jackson)
- Beth Holloway, author and mother of Natalee Holloway (Clinton)
- M. Carl Holman (1919–1988), author, poet, playwright (Minter City)
- Alan Huffman, author, journalist (Bolton)
- Sarah Gibson Humphreys (1830–1907), author, suffragist (Warren County)
- Greg Iles (1960–2025), novelist (Natchez)
- Germany Kent (born 1975), author, journalist (Greenville)
- Greg Keyes (born 1963), science fiction and fantasy writer (Meridian)
- Kiese Laymon (born 1974), novelist, memoirist (Jackson)
- Muna Lee (1895–1965), author and poet (Raymond)
- Sam Chu Lin (1939–2006), journalist (Greenville)
- Della Campbell MacLeod (ca. 1884 – ?), author, journalist (Greenwood)
- Anne Moody (1940–2015), author, activist (Centreville)
- Willie Morris (1934–1999), author, editor (Jackson)
- Jess Mowry (born 1960), writer of books and stories for children and young adults (Starkville)
- Thomas Naylor (1936–2012), author and economist (Jackson)
- Lewis Nordan (1939–2012), fiction author (Itta Bena)
- Steven Ozment (1939–2019), historian (McComb)
- Walker Percy (1916–1990), author (Greenville)
- William Alexander Percy (1885–1942), author (Greenville)
- Thomas Hal Phillips (1922–2007), author, film actor (Corinth)
- Robert M. Price (born 1954), theologian, writer (Jackson)
- William Raspberry (1935–2012), public affairs columnist (Okolona)
- Kevin Sessums (born 1956), magazine editor (Forest)
- Donald C. Simmons Jr. (born 1963), author and filmmaker (Eupora)
- Roscoe Simmons (1881–1951), journalist, activist (Greenville?)
- Patrick D. Smith (1927–2014), novelist (Mendenhall)
- Robert Bruce Smith IV (1945–2014), author, local historian (Tupelo)
- Lynne Spears (born 1955), author (Magnolia)
- Elizabeth Spencer (1921–2019), novelist (Carrollton)
- Stuart Stevens, author, political consultant (Jackson)
- William N. Still Jr. (1932–2023), maritime historian (Columbus)
- Kathryn Stockett (born 1969), novelist (Jackson)
- Kate Stone (1841–1907), diarist (Mississippi Springs, Hinds County)
- Donna Tartt (born 1963), novelist (Greenwood)
- Clifton Taulbert (born 1945), author and speaker (Glen Allan)
- Mildred Taylor (born 1943), author (Jackson)
- Wright Thompson (born 1976), sports writer (Clarksdale)
- Natasha Trethewey (born 1966), 2007 Pulitzer Prize-winning poet (Gulfport)
- Jamie Langston Turner (born 1949), Christian novelist
- Irving Vendig (1902–1995), television writer (Holly Springs)
- Brenda Venus (born 1947), author (Biloxi)
- Howard Waldrop (1946–2024), science fiction author (Houston)
- Rosa Kershaw Walker (1840–1909), writer, journalist, newspaper editor (Mississippi)
- Jesmyn Ward (born 1977), novelist (DeLisle)
- Peggy Webb (born 1942), romance novel author (Mooreville)
- Eudora Welty (1909–2001), novelist, short story writer (Jackson)
- Curtis Wilkie (born 1940), journalist, historian (Greenville)
- Paige Williams (born 1969), journalist, author (Tupelo)
- Tennessee Williams (1911–1983), playwright (Columbus)
- Amos N. Wilson (1941–1995), psychologist, author (Hattiesburg)
- Richard Nathaniel Wright (1908–1960) (Roxie)
- Al Young (1939–2021), poet, novelist, essayist, screenwriter (Ocean Springs)
- Stark Young (1881–1963), playwright, novelist, literary critic, essayist (Como)

== Miscellaneous ==
- Arthur Blessitt (born 1940), preacher (Greenville)
- Miriam Chamani (born 1943), Mambo priestess, co-founder of New Orleans Voodoo Spiritual Temple (Jackson)
- James Copeland (1823–1857), outlaw and co-leader of Wages and Copeland Clan (Jackson County)
- Cat Cora (born 1967), first female Iron Chef America in franchise history (Jackson)
- Margaret Ferguson (born 1968), political scientist (Hattiesburg)
- Jeff Fort (born 1947), leader of Black P. Stones Nation (Aberdeen)
- Natalee Holloway (born 1986), unsolved disappearance (Clinton)
- Larry Hoover (born 1950), leader of Gangster Disciple Nation (Jackson)
- Abby Howard (born 1992), internet cartoonist
- Leslie Hubricht (1908–2005), biologist and malacologist (Meridian)
- Mary Comfort Leonard (1856–1940), founder of Delta Gamma fraternity (Kosciusko)
- Floyd Mayweather Sr. (born 1952), boxer (Amory)
- Kelly Mitchell, leader of Romani people in Mississippi
- L. H. Musgrove (1832–1868), outlaw hanged by vigilante committee in Denver, Colorado (Panola County)
- Haller Nutt (1816–1864), planter, builder of Longwood (Jefferson County)
- Richard Ragan (born 1964), White House official, UN diplomat (Cleveland)
- The Scott Sisters, convicted of murder in controversial case that drew national attention
- Lenny Skutnik (born 1953), celebrity rescuer of 1982 disaster victim
- Toby Turner (born 1985), YouTube star, better known as Tobuscus (Osborn)

== See also ==
- List of Mississippi State University people
- List of Mississippi suffragists
