= Miss Mississippi's Teen =

Beauty pageant

- Formation: 2005
- Type: Beauty pageant
- Headquarters: Vicksburg
- Location: Mississippi
- Members: Miss America's Teen
- Official language: English
- Website: Official website

For the state pageant affiliated with Miss Teen USA, see Miss Mississippi Teen USA

The Miss Mississippi's Teen competition is the pageant that selects the representative for the U.S. state of Mississippi in the Miss America's Teen pageant.

Madalyn Sullivan of Oxford was crowned Miss Mississippi's Teen on June 13, 2026, at the Vicksburg Convention Center in Vicksburg, Mississippi. She competed for the title of Miss America's Teen 2027 on September 5, 2026 in West Palm Beach, Florida, and was named first runner-up.

== Results summary ==
The year in parentheses indicates year of Miss America's Outstanding Teen competition the award/placement was garnered.

=== Placements ===
- 1st runner-up: Madalyn Sullivan (2027)
- 2nd runner-up: Brooke Bumgarner (2025)
- 4th runner-up: Molly May (2013)
- Top 10: Jasmine Murray (2008), Jane Granberry (2020)
- Top 11: Tori Johnston (2022)

=== Awards ===
==== Preliminary awards ====
- Preliminary Talent: Molly May (2013)
- Preliminary Evening Gown: Brooke Bumgarner (2025), Avery McNair (2026), Madalyn Sullivan (2027)

==== Other awards ====
- Teens in Action Award Finalists: France Beard (2012), Stella Ford (2017), Presley Caldwell (2019)
- Teens in Action Award 1st Runner-Up: Madalyn Sullivan (2027)

== Winners ==
- Declared as Winner
- Ended as a runner-up
- Ended as a finalist or semi-finalist

Year	Name	Hometown	Age	Local title	Talent	Placement at MAO Teen	Special scholarships at MAO Teen	Notes
2026	Madalyn Sullivan	Oxford	15	Miss Metro Jackson's Teen	Lyrical Dance	1st runner-up	Preliminary Evening Gown Teens in Action 1st Runner-Up	
2025	Avery McNair	Magee	18	Miss Madison County's Teen	Piano		Preliminary Evening Gown	
2024	Brooke Bumgarner	Madison	17	Miss Pine Belt's Teen	Vocal, "Somewhere Over The Rainbow"	2nd runner-up	Preliminary Evening Gown	Miss University 2027
2023	Nataleigh Nix	Madison		Miss Metro Jackson's Teen	Vocal			4th runner up at Miss Mississippi 2026
2022	Cameron Davis	Meridian	17	Miss Pine Belt's Outstanding Teen	Dance			3rd Runner Up at Miss Mississippi 2026
2021	Tori Johnston	Madison	18	Miss Central Mississippi's Outstanding Teen	Broadway Vocal, "Tomorrow" from Annie	Top 11		
2019-20	Jane Granberry	Hattiesburg	16	Miss Hattiesburg's Outstanding Teen	Jazz Dance, "River Deep – Mountain High"	Top 10		Later Miss Mississippi 2026
2018	Presley Caldwell	Grenada	17	Miss Northland's Outstanding Teen	Vocal, "Desperado" by The Eagles		Teens in Action Award Finalist	
2017	Holly Brand	Meridian	17	Miss Vicksburg's Outstanding Teen	Vocal, “Up to the Mountain”			Later Miss Mississippi 2021
2016	Stella Ford	Brandon	17	Miss Southern Grace's Outstanding Teen	Vocal, "At Last" by Etta James		Teens in Action Award Finalist	
2015	Grace Post	Madison	16	Miss Central Mississippi's Outstanding Teen	Dance			
2014	Grace Munro	Ocean Springs	17	Miss Turtle Creek's Outstanding Teen	Jazz Dance			
2013	Anne Elizabeth Buys	Vicksburg	14	Miss Riverland's Outstanding Teen	Ballet en pointe			Later Miss Mississippi 2017
2012	Molly May	Houston	17	Miss Dixie's Outstanding Teen	Vocal, "And I Am Telling You" from Dreamgirls	4th runner-up	Preliminary Talent Award	2nd runner-up at Miss Mississippi 2016 pageant 3rd runner-up at Miss Mississippi 2019 competition Later 1st runner-up at National Sweetheart 2019 Later Miss Mississippi World 2020
2011	France Beard	Madison	17	Miss Madison's Outstanding Teen	Dance		Teens in Action Award Finalist	1st runner-up at Miss Mississippi 2015 pageant
2010	Christina Bostick	Hattiesburg	16	Miss Leaf River Valley's Outstanding Teen	Dance, "Jellicle Ball" from Cats			
2009	Laura Lee Lewis	Brookhaven	15	Miss Heartland's Outstanding Teen	Vocal			Later Miss Mississippi 2016; 4th runner-up at Miss America 2017 pageant
2008	Morgan Lindsey Burnett	Brandon	17	Miss New South's Outstanding Teen	Jazz Dance, "New Attitude"			
2007	Jasmine Murray	Columbia		Miss Houston/North Central's Outstanding Teen	Vocal	Top 10		Top 13 Finalist on season 8 of American Idol Later Miss Mississippi 2014; Top 10 at Miss America 2015 pageant
2006	Kasey Wilder	Pontotoc		Miss Pontotoc's Outstanding Teen	Vocal			
2005	Natalie Wood	Oxford	15		Theatrical Jazz Dance			
