= Lynn Franklin =

Lynn Franklin may refer to:

- Lynn Franklin (writer, born 1922) (1922–2005), American police detective and writer
- Lynn Franklin (writer, born 1946) (1946–2021), American literary agent and memoirist
