= Miss America 1959 =

Beauty pageant held in New Jersey, US

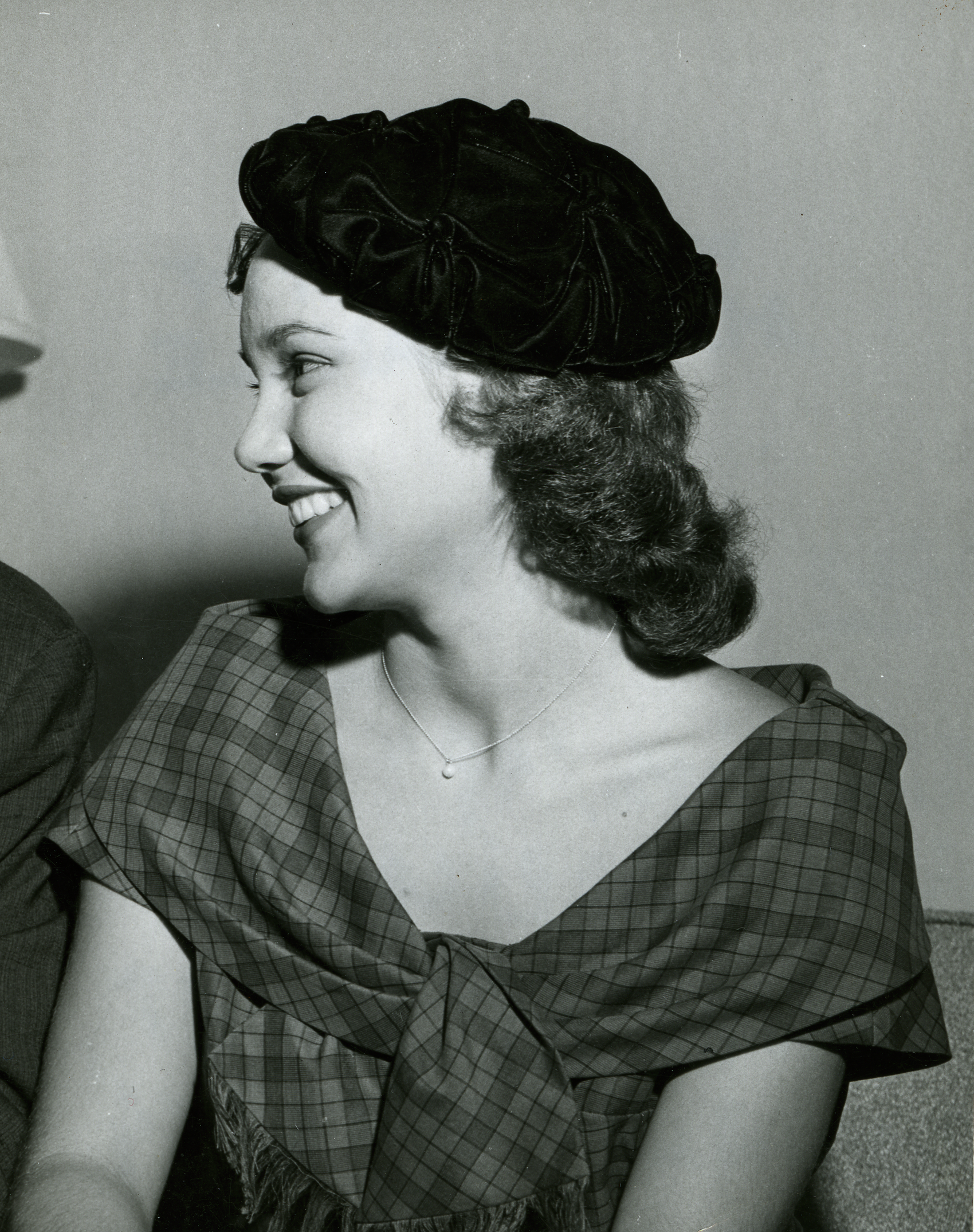
- Mary Ann Mobley, Miss America 1959
- Date: September 6, 1958
- Presenters: Bert Parks
- Venue: Boardwalk Hall, Atlantic City, New Jersey
- Broadcaster: CBS
- Entrants: 52
- Placements: 10
- Winner: Mary Ann Mobley; Mississippi

Miss America 1959, the 32nd Miss America pageant, was held at the Boardwalk Hall in Atlantic City, New Jersey on September 6, 1958 on CBS.

Mary Ann Mobley, the first winner from Mississippi, became an actress, featured in two Elvis Presley films and many television series. Second runner-up Anita Bryant later gained fame as a singer, television spokesperson, and Christian activist against gay rights in the United States.

== Results ==
=== Placements ===
Placement	Contestant
Miss America 1959	Mississippi – Mary Ann Mobley
1st Runner-Up	Iowa – Joanne Lucille MacDonald
2nd Runner-Up	Oklahoma – Anita Bryant
3rd Runner-Up	California – Sandra Lee Jennings
4th Runner-Up	North Carolina – Betty Lane Evans
Top 10	Alabama – Lee Thornberry; Arkansas – Sally Miller; Connecticut – Billie June Turner; Texas – Mary Neil Hendricks; Utah – Janet Carolyn Secor

=== Awards ===
==== Preliminary awards ====
Awards	Contestant
Lifestyle and Fitness	California - Sandra Lee Jennings; Indiana - Anita Marie Hursh; North Carolina - Betty Lane Evans
Talent	Alabama - Lee Thornberry; Connecticut - Billie June Turner; Mississippi - Mary Ann Mobley

=== Other awards ===
Awards	Contestant
Miss Congeniality	Rhode Island - Ann Louise Willis
Non Finalist Classical/Semi Classical Vocalist Talent	South Carolina - Gene Lenoir Wilson
Non Finalist Instrumental Talent	Idaho - Bonnie Leila Baird
Non Finalist Dancer	Chicago - Audra Deckmann
Non Finalist Popular Vocal Talent	New Jersey - Marilyn Beryl Rockafellow
Overall Non Finalist Talent	Nebraska - Sherry Johnson; New Hampshire - Mary Morin

== Contestants ==
State	Name	Hometown	Age	Talent	Placement	Awards	Notes
Alabama	Lee Thornberry	Birmingham	21	Vocal/Dance, "Honey Bun" from South Pacific	Top 10	Preliminary Talent Award	
Alaska	Stuart Johnson	Douglas City	19	Piano, "Alaska's Flag"			
Arizona	Donna Riggs	Phoenix	20	Vocal/Dance, "Teacher's Pet"		Unspecified Special Scholarship	
Arkansas	Sally Miller	Pine Bluff	19	Classical Vocal, "Caro Nome" from Rigoletto	Top 10		
California	Sandra Jennings	Riverside	18	Piano, "Clair de Lune"	3rd runner-up	Preliminary Lifestyle & Fitness Award	
Canada	Danica d'Hondt	Vancouver	19	Dramatic Reading			
Chicago	Audrey Deckmann	Chicago	23	Dance		Non-finalist Talent Award	
Colorado	Cynthia Cullen	Boulder	20	Drama, "Queen on Being Sentenced to Death"			
Connecticut	Billie June Turner	New Canaan	20	Ballet en Pointe from Les Sylphides	Top 10	Preliminary Talent Award	
Delaware	Nancy M. Williams	Wilmington	19	Dance to musical selections from Gone with the Wind			
(Washington, D.C.) District of Columbia	Lee Berkow	Washington, D.C.	19	Vocal, "Come Rain or Come Shine"			
Florida	Dianne Tauscher	Orlando	18	Ballet, "Canadian Sunset"			
(Georgia (U.S. state)) Georgia	Jeanette Ardell	Marietta	19	Archery Demonstration			
Hawaii	Georgietta Kahalelaukoa Parker	Honolulu	18	Hula Dance			
Idaho	Bonnie Leila Baird	Heyburn	18	Clarinet		Non-finalist Talent Award	
Illinois	Anita Ruth Olson	River Forest	20	Piano, "Rhapsody in G Minor" by Johannes Brahms			
Indiana	Anita Hursh	Goshen	19	Piano, "Polonaise" by Frédéric Chopin		Preliminary Lifestyle & Fitness Award	
Iowa	Joanne MacDonald	Ames	20	Dramatic Recitation from The White Cliffs of Dover	1st runner-up		
Kansas	Sharon Whitacre	Mission	18	Accordion, "3rd Movement of Concerto in A" by Pietro Deiro			
Kentucky	Sandra Sue Smith	Harlan	19	Pantomime/Dance, "Tweedle Dee"			
Louisiana	Alberta Louise Futch	Hammond	19	Fire Baton Twirling			
Maine	Terry Suzanne Tripp	Lewiston	18	Ballet			
Maryland	Mary Roberta Page	Bethesda	18	Chalk Sketch			
Massachusetts	Patricia Nordling	Lexington	20	Vocal/Piano, "Exactly Like You"			
Michigan	Patience Pierce	Detroit	23	Drama, "Meet Christobel"			
Minnesota	Diane Albers	St. Paul	19	Piano, "Allegro de Concierto" by Enrique Granados			
Mississippi	Mary Ann Mobley	Brandon	21	Vocal Medley & Dance, "Un Bel Di" & "There'll be Some Changes Made"	Winner	Preliminary Talent Award	
Missouri	Marjorie Critten	Kansas City	19	Tap Dance, "Opus No. 1"			
Nebraska	Sherry Johnson	Omaha	18	Dramatic Monologue		Non-finalist Talent Award	
Nevada	Judy Wadsworth	Sparks	18	Dramatic Monologue from The Lark			
New Hampshire	Mary Morin	Manchester	18	Pantomime Routine		Non-finalist Talent Award	
New Jersey	Marilyn Beryl Rockafellow	New Monmouth	19	Ukulele and Vocal Accompaniment		Non-finalist Talent Award	
New Mexico	Lois Wilson	Hobbs	19	Vocal			
(New York (state)) New York	Miriam Sanderson	Rensselaer	20	French Vocal, "Serenade" by Sigmund Romberg			
New York City	Bette June Piller	New York City	19	Speech on Art			
North Carolina	Betty Evans	Greenville	18	Vocal, Piano, Skit, & Dance, "Wait 'til You See Her"	4th runner-up	Preliminary Lifestyle & Fitness Award	
North Dakota	Helen Korfhage	Grand Forks	19	Classical Vocal, "If Thou Lov'st Me"			
Ohio	Margaret Putman	Ada	19	Dramatic Sketch, "Student Nurse"			
Oklahoma	Anita Bryant	Tulsa	18	Vocal, "When the Boys Talk About the Girls"	2nd runner-up	Popular singing star	
Oregon	Mary Ellen Vinton	McMinnville	18	Piano & Tap Dance, "I Won't Dance"			
Pennsylvania	Rosalie Samley	Bethlehem	20	Ballet, "I Won't Dance"			
Rhode Island	Ann Willis	Cranston	18	Recite Two Original Poems While Displaying Original Paintings		Miss Congeniality	
South Carolina	Gene Wilson	Charleston	18	Vocal, "If I Loved You"		Non-finalist Talent Award	
South Dakota	Carolee Nelson	Irene	20	Dramatic Reading			
Tennessee	Patricia Eaves	Cookeville	18	Dramatic Monologue, "Viola's Ring Scene" from Twelfth Night			
Texas	Mary Nell Hendricks	Arlington	22	Vocal, "Getting to Know You"	Top 10		
Utah	Janet Carolyn Secor	Salt Lake City	21	Classical Ballet, "The Waltz" from The Sleeping Beauty	Top 10		
Vermont	Sandra Sinclair	South Burlington	18	Vocal & Dance, "Getting to Know You"			
Virginia	Barbara Guthrie	Martinsville	19	Dramatic Reading			
(Washington (state)) Washington	Anne Henderson	Spokane	19	Pantomime & Charleston Dance			
West Virginia	Sandra Boyd	Fairmont	21	Vocal, "Money Honey"			
Wisconsin	Kay Ross	West Allis	24	Art Presentation with Vocal & Dance			
