= Miss Mississippi =

Beauty pageant competition

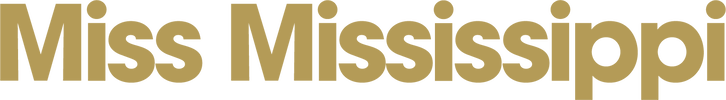
- Formation: 1934
- Type: Beauty pageant
- Headquarters: Vicksburg
- Location: Mississippi
- Members: Miss America
- Official language: English
- Website: Official website

Miss Mississippi is a scholarship pageant and a preliminary of Miss America. The contest began in 1934, has been held in Vicksburg since 1958, and provides more money than any other scholarship pageant in the Miss America Organization.

Four Miss Mississippis have won the Miss America crown: Mary Ann Mobley (1959), Lynda Lee Mead (1960), Cheryl Prewitt (1980), and Susan Akin (1986).

The current titleholder is Jane Granberry of Hattiesburg, who was crowned Miss Mississippi 2026 on June 13, 2026, at the Vicksburg Convention Center in Vicksburg, Mississippi. She competed for the title of Miss America 2027 on September 6, 2026 in West Palm Beach, Florida, and was a Top 11 semifinalist.

== Gallery of past titleholders ==
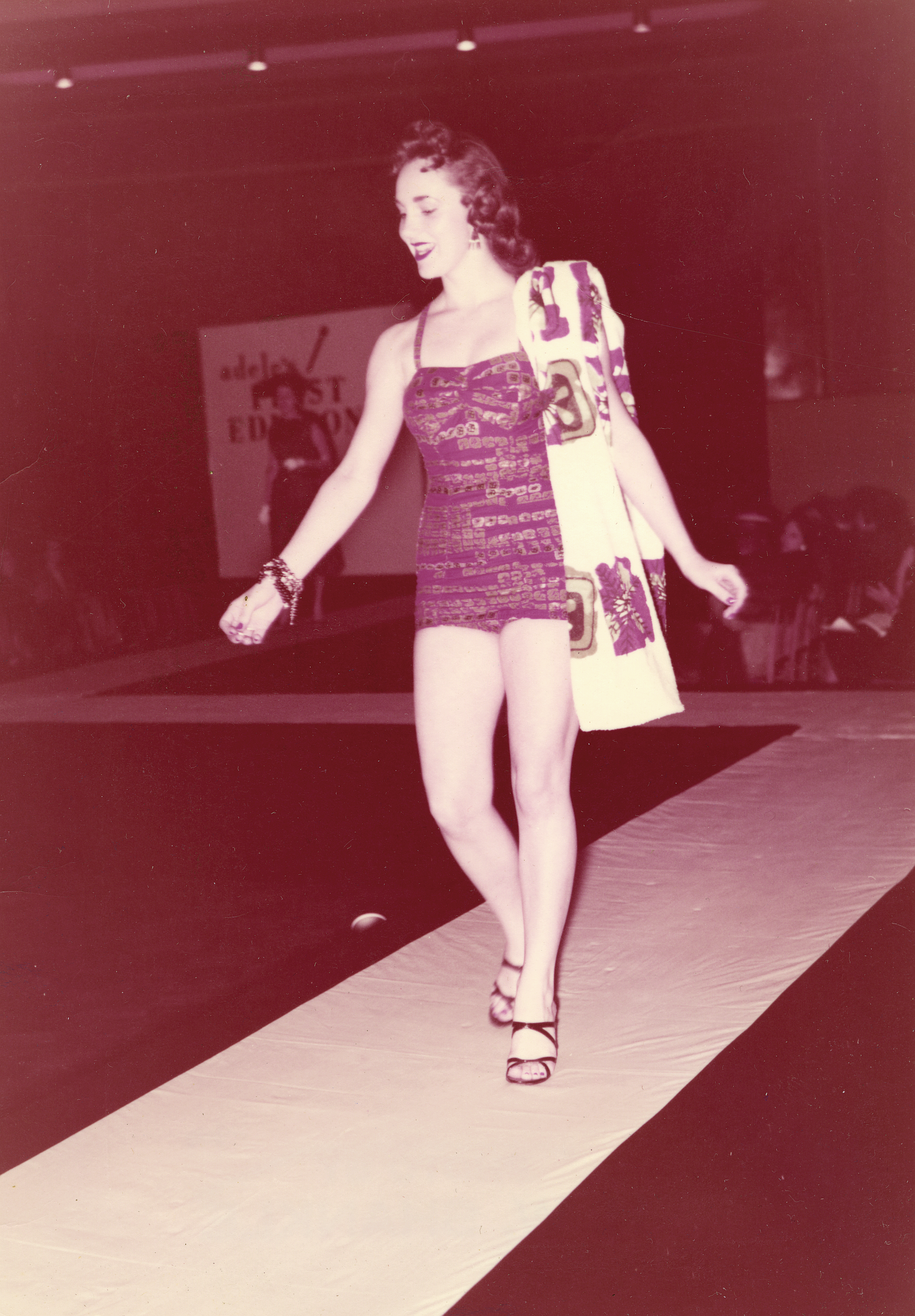
Carolyn Cochran,
Miss Mississippi 1955

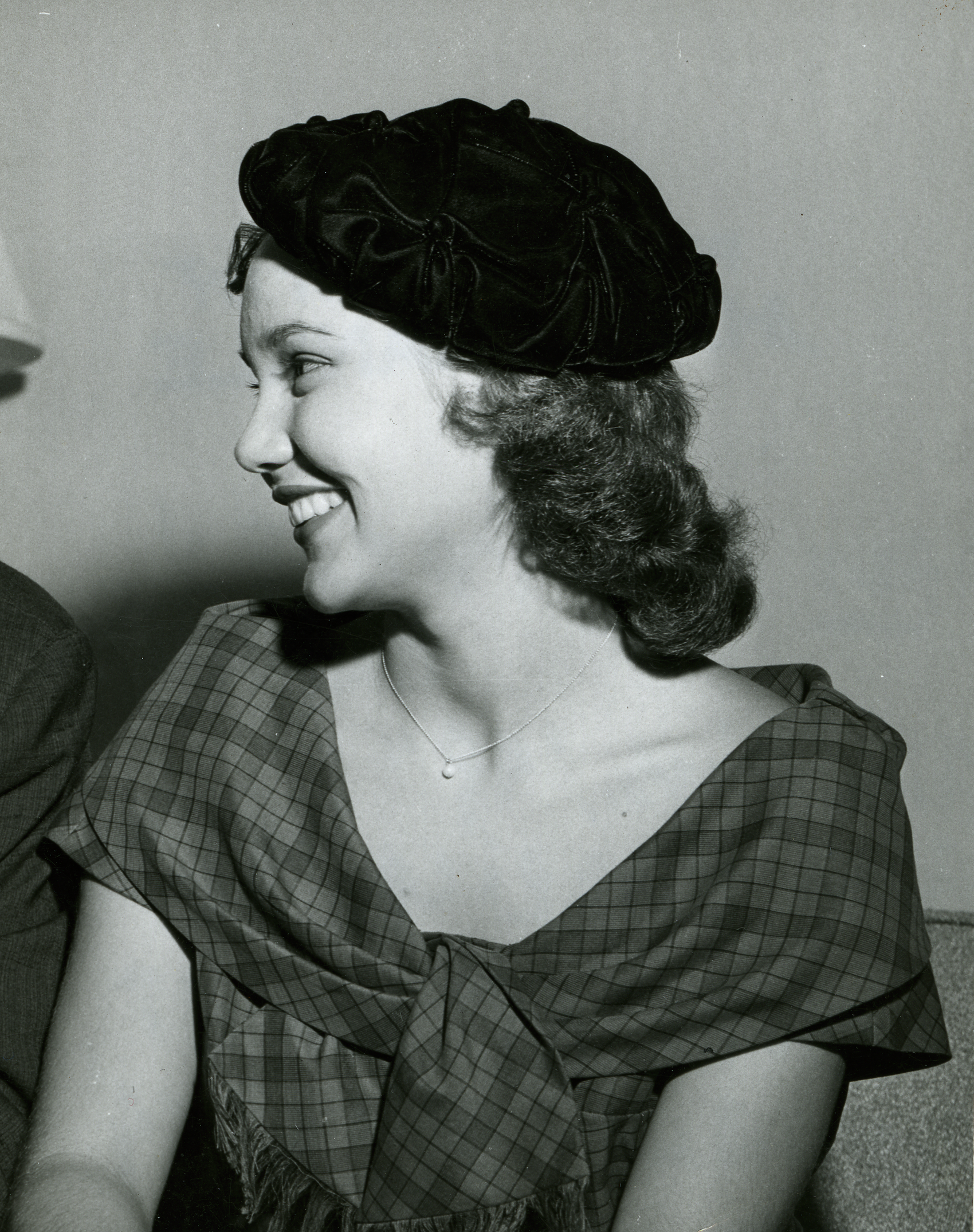
Mary Ann Mobley,
Miss Mississippi 1958 and Miss America 1959

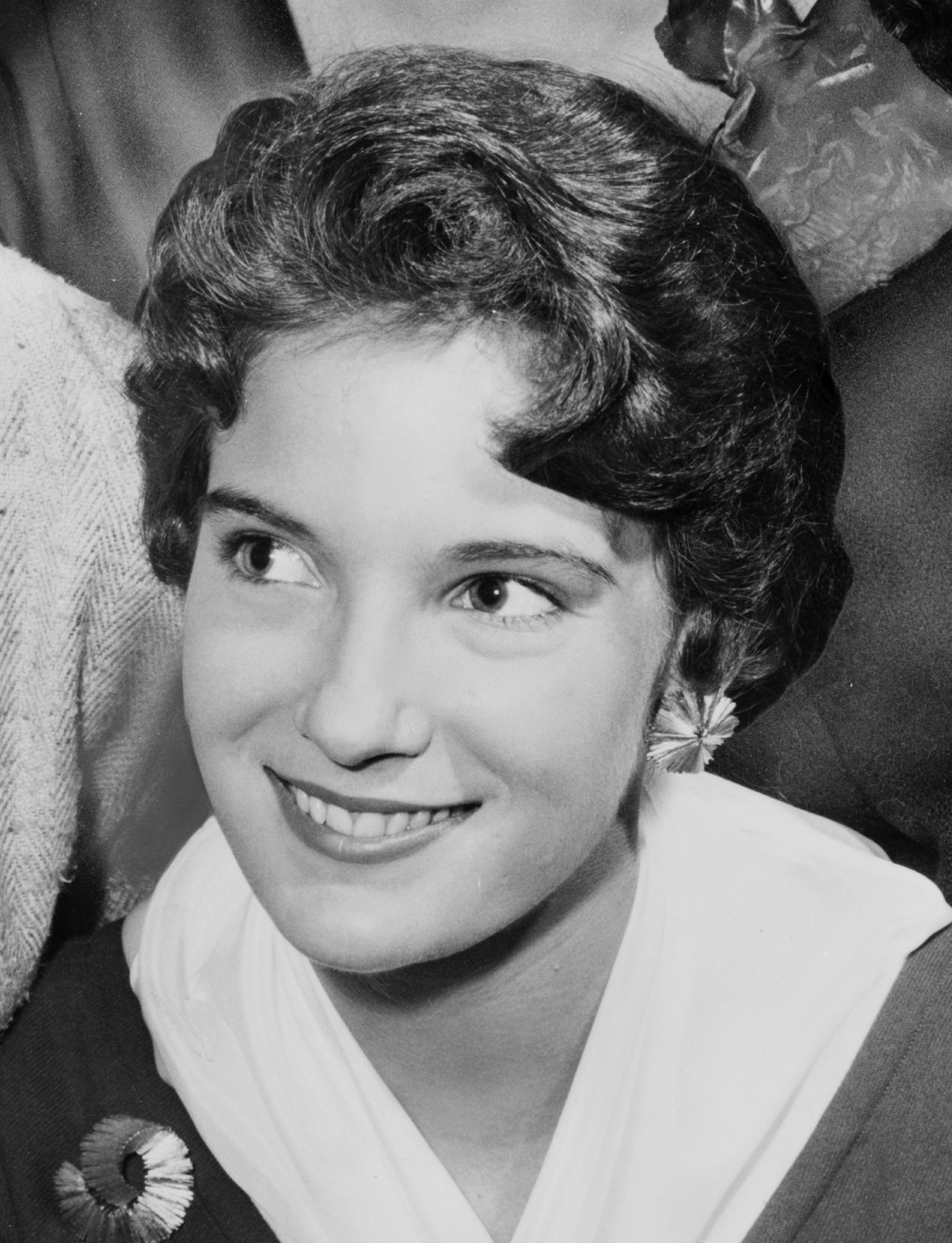
Lynda Lee Mead,
Miss Mississippi 1959 and Miss America 1960

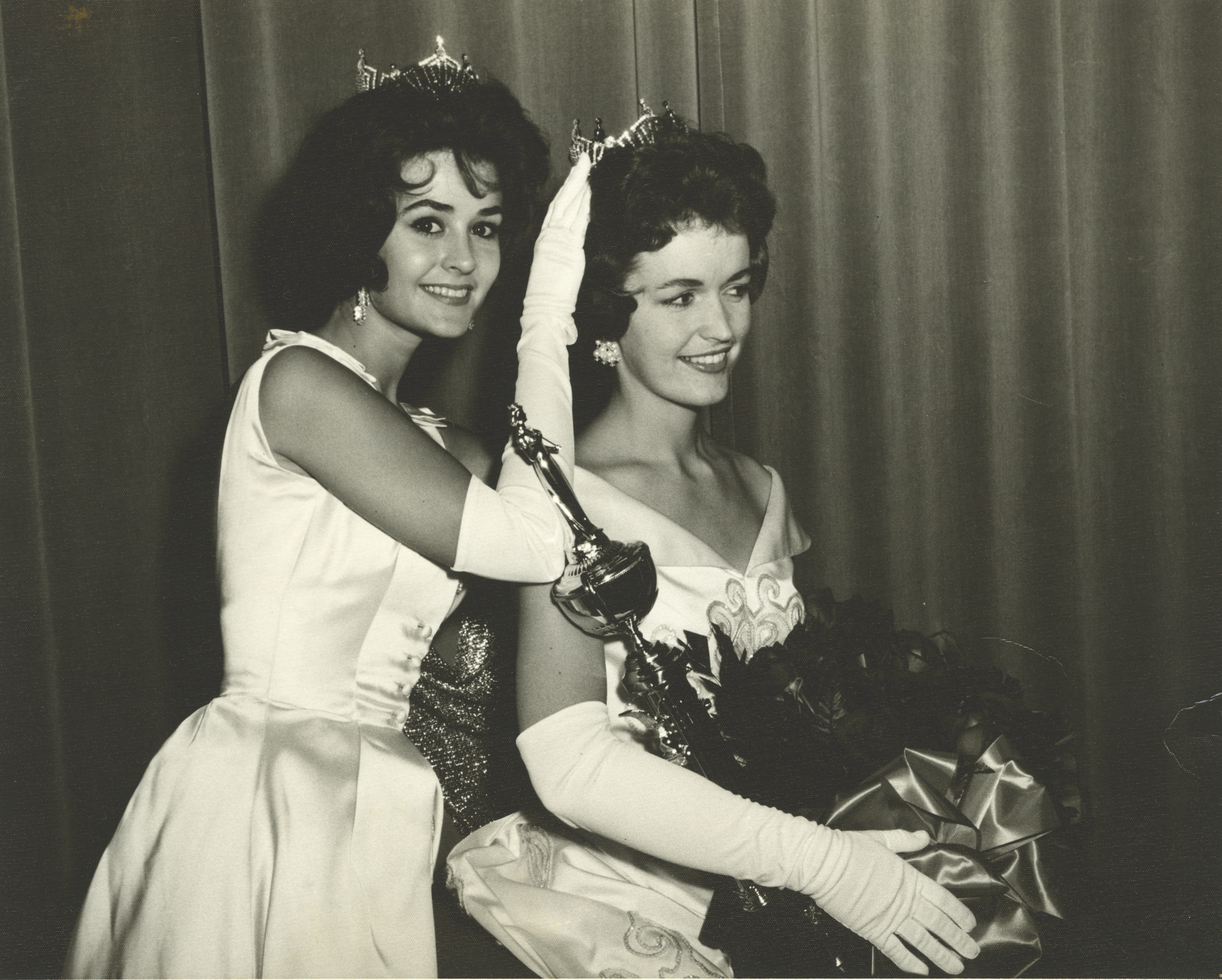
Miss Mississippi 1960, Patricia McRaney, crowning Miss Mississippi 1961, Annice Jernigan

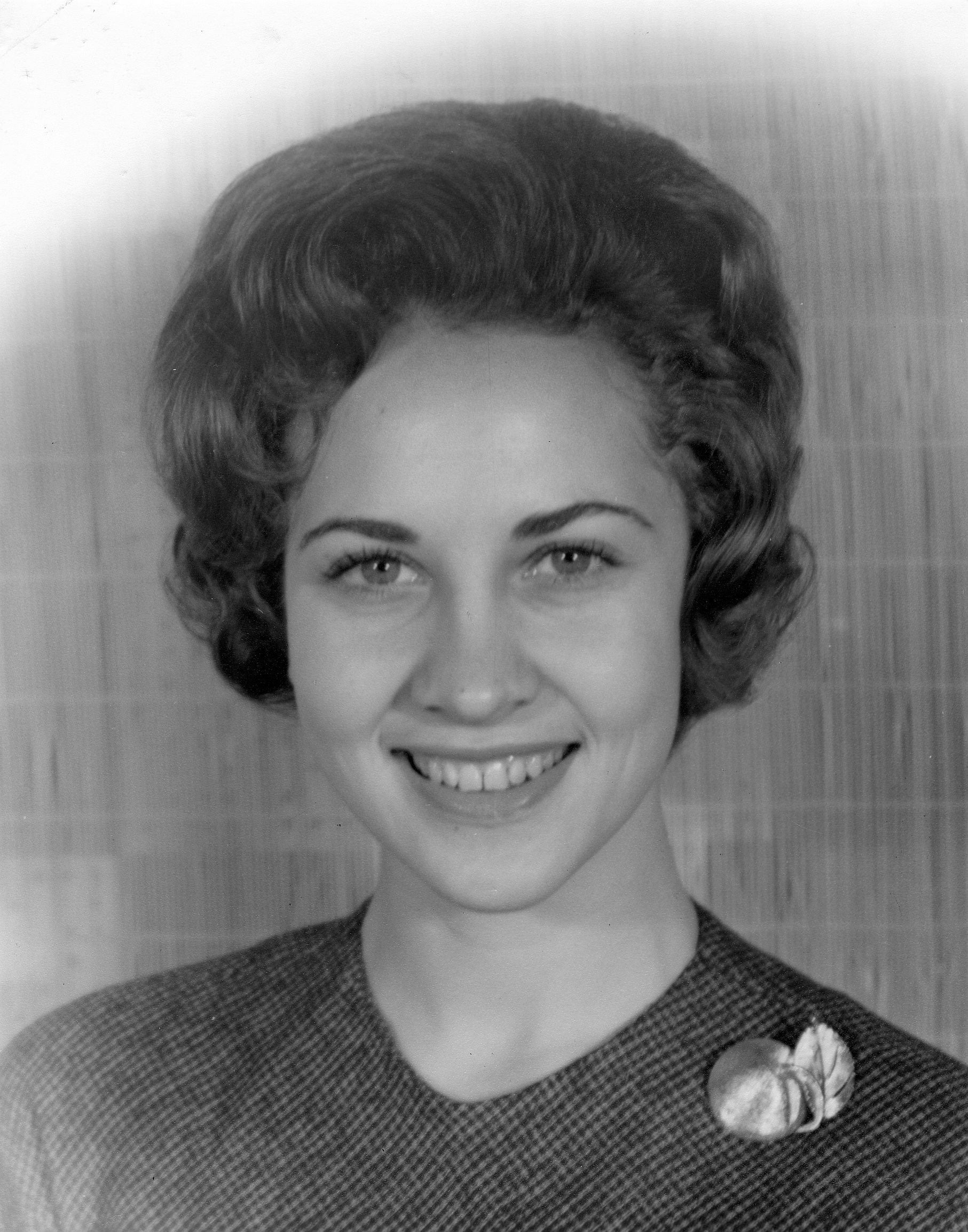
Charlotte Ann Carroll,
Miss Mississippi 1962

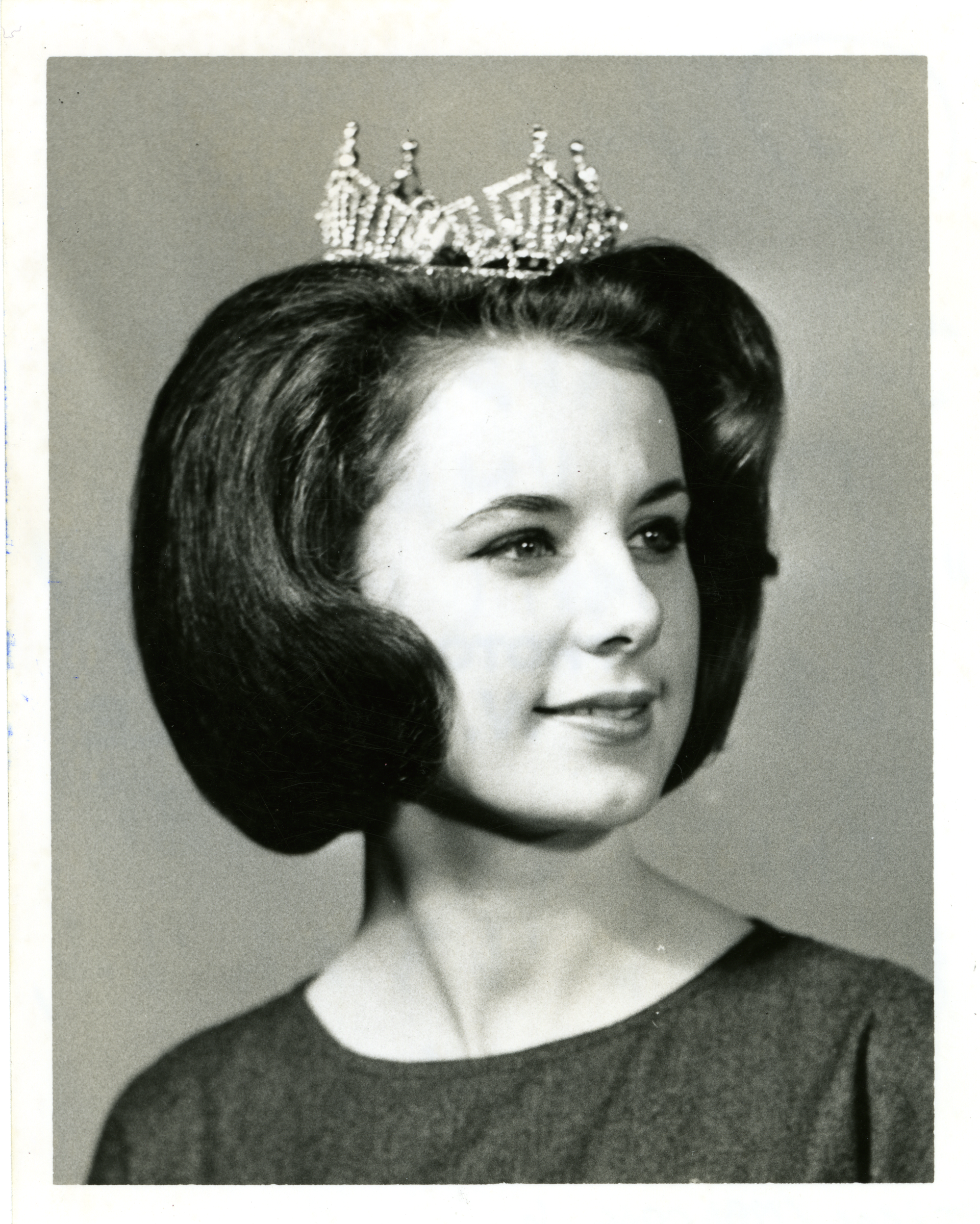
Jan Nave,
Miss Mississippi 1963

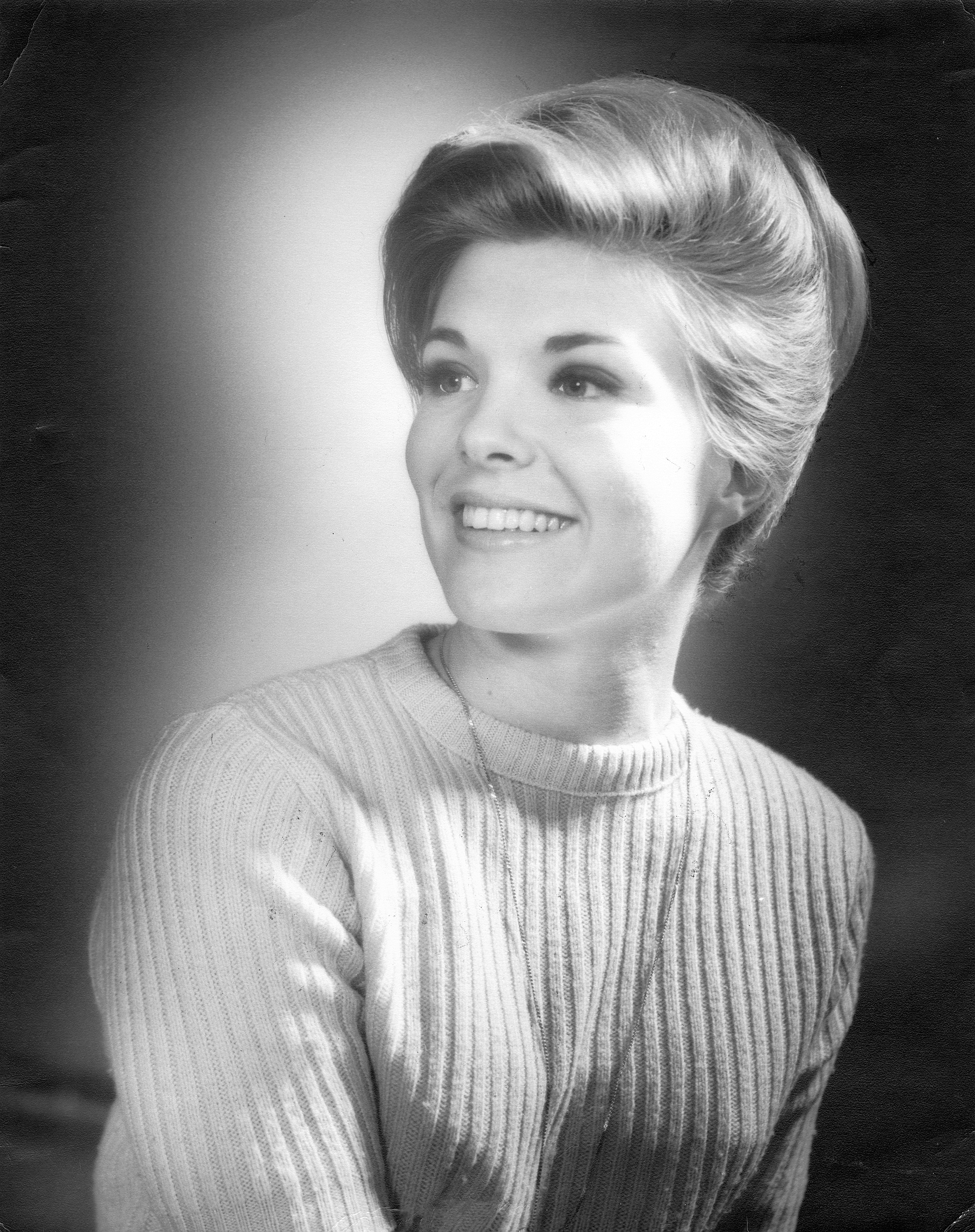
Patricia Puckett,
Miss Mississippi 1965

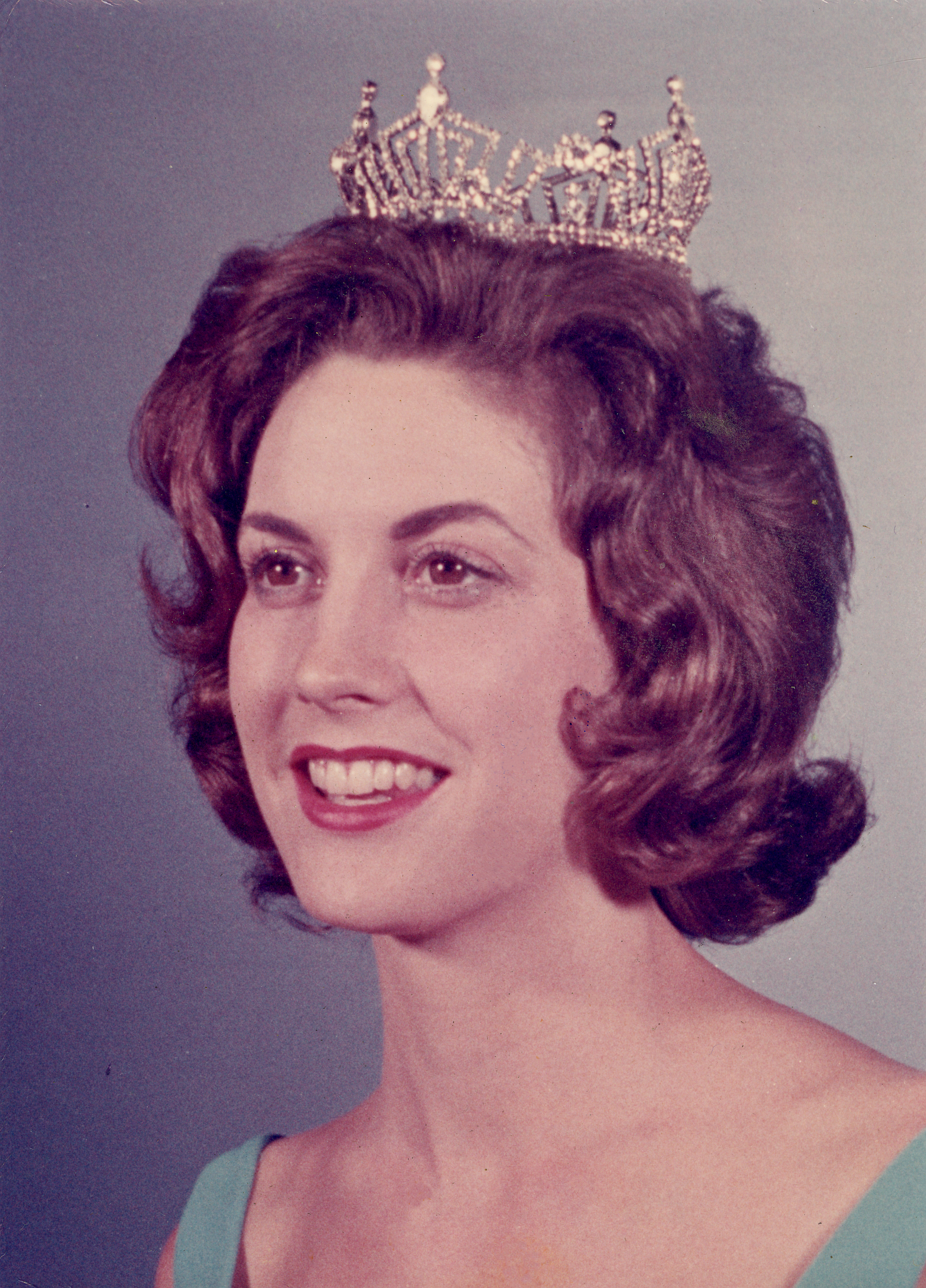
Robbie Robertson,
Miss Mississippi 1966

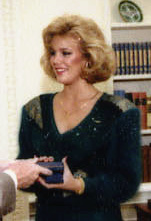
Susan Akin,
Miss Mississippi 1985 and Miss America 1986

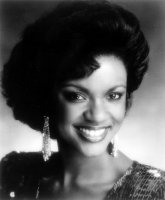
Toni Seawright,
Miss Mississippi 1987

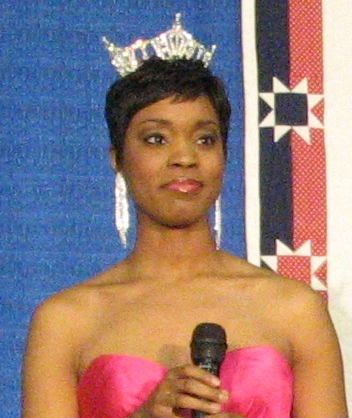
Kimberly Morgan,
Miss Mississippi 2007

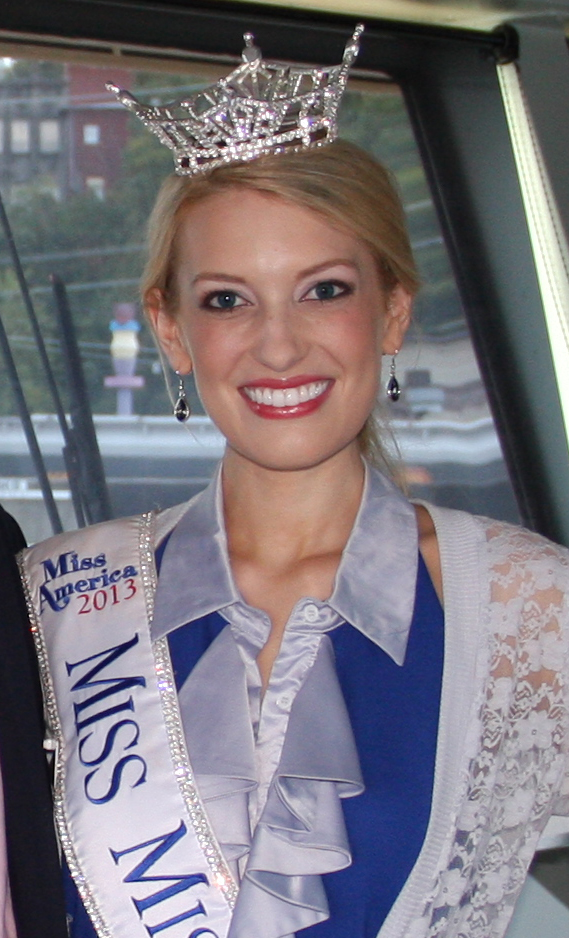
Chelsea Rick,
Miss Mississippi 2013

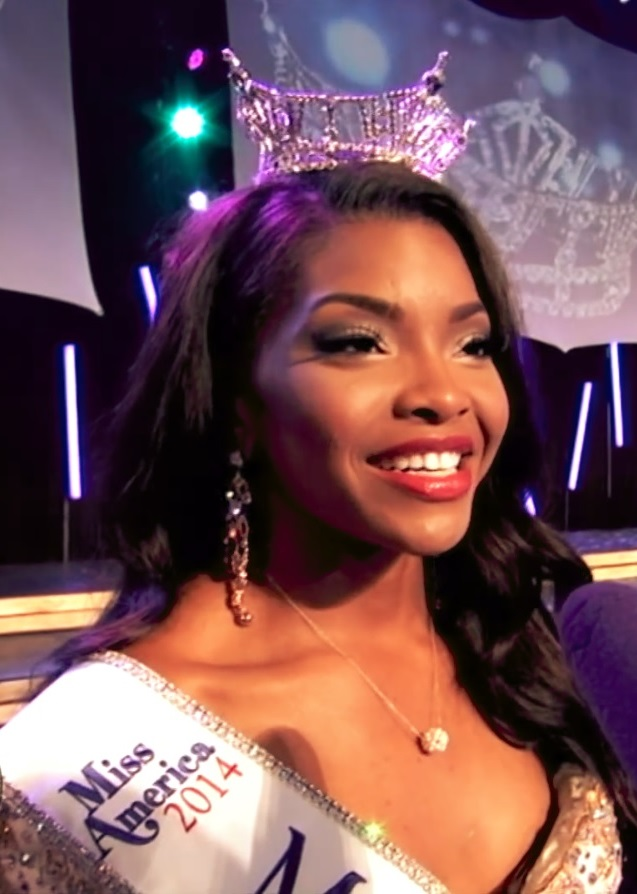
Jasmine Murray,
Miss Mississippi 2014

== Results summary ==
The following is a visual summary of the past results of Miss Mississippi titleholders at the national Miss America pageants/competitions. The year in parentheses indicates the year of the national competition during which a placement and/or award was garnered, not the year attached to the contestant's state title.

=== Placements ===
- Miss Americas: Mary Ann Mobley (1959), Lynda Lee Mead (1960), Cheryl Prewitt (1980), Susan Akin (1986)
- 1st runners-up: Katherine Wright (1949), Patricia Puckett (1966), Joan Myers (1968), Hannah Roberts (2016)
- 2nd runners-up: Donna Pope (1981) (tie), Dianne Evans (1983), Kathy Manning (1985), Myra Barginear (1998)
- 3rd runners-up: Christine McClamroch (1971), Wanda Geddie (1984), Christy May (2001), Taryn Foshee (2007)
- 4th runners-up: Suzanne Dugger (1954), Toni Seawright (1988), Mary Allison Hurdle (1992), Laura Lee Lewis (2017)
- Top 10: Charlotte Ann Carroll (1963), Karen Hopson (1982), Kimberly McGuffee (1987), Carla Haag (1989), Rebecca Blouin (1995), Monica Louwerens (1996), Kari Litton (1997), Jennifer Adcock (2003), Jasmine Murray (2015)
- Top 11: Anna Leah Jolly (2026) Jane Granberry (2027)
- Top 15: Laurice McFarland (1925), Jessie Morgan (1952), Chelsea Rick (2014)
- Top 16: Kimberly Morgan (2008)
- Top 18: Dorothy Ely (1933)
- Top 20: Becky Pruett (2002)

=== Awards ===
==== Preliminary awards ====
- Preliminary Evening Gown: Jane Granberry (2027)
- Preliminary Lifestyle and Fitness: Patricia Puckett (1966), Cheri Brown (1979) (tie), Cheryl Prewitt (1980), Donna Pope (1981), Karen Hopson (1982), Wanda Geddie (1984), Kathy Manning (1985), Susan Akin (1986), Carla Haag (1989), Beth Howell (1991), Christy May (2001), Jennifer Adcock (2003), Christine Kozlowski (2009), Chelsea Rick (2014), Vivian O'Neal (2024)
- Preliminary Talent: Mary Ann Mobley (1959), Charlotte Ann Carroll (1963), Dianne Evans (1983), Lenena Holder (1994), Becky Pruett (2002)

==== Non-finalist awards ====
- Non-finalist Talent: Lennie Nobles (1946), Patricia McRaney (1961), Robbie Robertson (1967), Lenena Holder (1994), Heather Soriano (2000), Sarah Beth James (2011), Marie Wicks (2013)

==== Other awards ====
- Miss Congeniality: Doris Coggins (1939), Dorothy Fox (1942)
- Dr. David B. Allman Medical Scholarship: Myra Barginear (1998)
- Jean Bartel Social Impact Initiative Winner: Emmie Perkins (2023)
- Jean Bartel Social Impact Initiative Finalist: Holly Brand (2022)
- Louanne Gamba Instrumental Award: Hannah Roberts (2016)
- Quality of Life Award 2nd runners-up: Becky Pruett (2002), Asya Branch (2019)
- Quality of Life Award Finalists: Jasmine Murray (2015), Hannah Roberts (2016), Laura Lee Lewis (2017), Anne Elizabeth Buys (2018), Anna Leah Jolly (2026)
- Rembrandt Mentor Award: Monica Louwerens (1996)
- STEM Scholarship Award Winners: Chelsea Rick (2014), Hannah Roberts (2016)

== Winners ==
- Declared as winner
- Ended as a runner-up
- Ended as a finalist or semi-finalist

Year	Name	Hometown	Age	Local Title	Miss America Talent	Placement at Miss America	Special scholarships at Miss America	Notes
2026	Jane Granberry	Hattiesburg	23	Miss Capital City	Dance	Top 11	Preliminary Evening Gown	Previously Mississippi Miss Hospitality 2021 Previously Miss Mississippi's Outstanding Teen 2019-20
2025	Anna Leah Jolly	Brandon	23	Miss Capital City	Ballet en pointe	Top 11	Quality of Life Award Finalist	
2024	Becky Williams	Purvis	22	Miss Capital City	Jazz Dance, "Move You're Steppin' on My Heart"			Previously Distinguished Young Woman of Mississippi 2020
2023	Vivian O'Neal	Hattiesburg	25	Miss Pine Belt	Dance		Preliminary Lifestyle & Fitness Award	
2022	Emmie Perkins	Hattiesburg	21	Miss Mississippi State University	Vocal		Jean Bartel Social Impact Initiative Scholarship	
2021	Holly Brand	Meridian	21	Miss Golden Triangle	Vocal		Jean Bartel Social Impact Initiative Finalist Non-Finalist Talent Award	Previously Miss Mississippi's Outstanding Teen 2017 Semi-finalist on Season 23 of The Voice
2019–20 (Note: Titleholder extended to another full year in 2020 after state and national pageants postponed to 2021 due to the COVID-19 pandemic)	Mary Margaret Hyer	Hattiesburg	23	Miss Riverbend	Classical Vocal, "Queen of the Night aria" from The Magic Flute			
2018	Asya Branch	Booneville	20	Miss Tupelo	Vocal, "The Impossible Dream" from Man of La Mancha		Quality of Life Award 2nd runner-up	Later Miss Mississippi USA 2020; Later Miss USA 2020; Top 21 at Miss Universe 2020 pageant
2017	Anne Elizabeth Buys	Vicksburg	21	Miss Vicksburg	Ballet en pointe, "Viva" by Bond		Quality of Life Award Finalist	Previously Miss Mississippi's Outstanding Teen 2013 Cousin is married to Miss Mississippi 2009, Anna Tadlock Later 4th runner-up at Miss Mississippi USA 2021
2016	Laura Lee Lewis	Brookhaven	23	Miss Dixie	Vocal, "A Piece of Sky" from Yentl	4th runner-up	Quality of Life Award Finalist	Previously Miss Mississippi's Outstanding Teen 2009 3rd runner-up at National Sweetheart 2014 pageant Duke of Edinburgh's Award gold medalist
2015	Hannah Roberts	Mount Olive	22	Miss University of Southern Mississippi	Classical Violin, "Zapateado, No. 2, Opus 23"	1st runner-up	Louanne Gamba Instrumentalist Scholarship Quality of Life Award Finalist STEM Scholarship Award	Previously Distinguished Young Woman of Mississippi 2011; 2nd runner-up at Distinguished Young Woman of America 2011 competition
2014	Jasmine Murray	Columbus	22	Miss Riverland	Vocal, "Something's Got a Hold on Me"	Top 10	Quality of Life Award Finalist	Previously Miss Mississippi's Outstanding Teen 2007; Top 10 at Miss America's Outstanding Teen 2008 pageant American Idol Season 8 Finalist 3rd African American to be crowned Miss Mississippi
2013	Chelsea Rick	Fulton	23	Miss Amory Railroad Festival	Vocal, "Can't Help Lovin' That Man"	Top 15	Preliminary Lifestyle & Fitness Award STEM Scholarship Award	
2012	Marie Wicks	Ocean Springs	22	Miss Dixie	Piano, "Moonlight Sonata 3rd Movement"		Non-finalist Talent Award	
2011	Mary Margaret Roark	Cleveland	20	Miss North Central Mississippi	Piano, "Nostradamus" by Tonci Huljic			
2010	Sarah Beth James	Madison	20	Miss Metro Jackson	Piano, "Piano Fantasy" by William Joseph		Non-finalist Talent Award	
2009	Anna Tadlock	McCool	23	Miss New South	Vocal, "A New Life" from Jekyll & Hyde			Married cousin of Miss Mississippi 2017, Anne Elizabeth Buys
2008	Christine Kozlowski	D'Iberville	19	Miss Gulf Coast	Jazz Dance		Preliminary Lifestyle & Fitness Award	First Latina to be crowned Miss Mississippi
2007	Kimberly Morgan	Oxford	24	Miss Heritage	Vocal, "God Bless the Child"	Top 16		Second African American to be crowned Miss Mississippi
2006	Taryn Foshee	Clinton	21	Miss Byram Tri County	Piano, "El Cumbanchero" by Rafael Hernández Marín	3rd runner-up		
2005	Kristian Dambrino	Grenada	20	Miss Grenada County	Original Vocal & Piano Composition, "Pearlington's Prayer"			
2004	Jalin Wood	Waynesboro	23	Miss Metro Jackson	Piano, "Cumana"			Later Miss Mississippi USA 2007
2003	Allison Kellogg	Madison	22	Miss Madison County	Ballet en Pointe, "The Firebird"		Quality of Life finalist	Previously Mississippi's Junior Miss 1999 Top 8
2002	Jennifer Adcock	Hattiesburg	22	Miss West Central Mississippi	Piano, Rhapsody in Blue	Top 10	Preliminary Lifestyle & Fitness Award	Previously Mississippi's Junior Miss 1998; Later Miss Mississippi USA 2005; Top 10 at Miss USA 2005 pageant
2001	Becky Pruett	Laurel	22	Miss Deep South	Vocal, "Whatever Lola Wants"	Top 20	Preliminary Talent Award Quality of Life Award 2nd runner-up	
2000	Christy May	Pontotoc	24	Miss Pontotoc	Piano, "Theme from The Apartment"	3rd runner-up	Preliminary Lifestyle & Fitness Award	
1999	Heather Soriano	Philadelphia	22	Miss East Central Mississippi	Vocal / Dance, "Trouble" from Smokey Joe's Cafe		Non-finalist Talent Award	Later Miss Mississippi USA 2002
1998	Melinda King	Waynesboro	22	Miss Hattiesburg	Vocal, "I Got It Bad (and That Ain't Good)"			
1997	Myra Barginear	Grenada	23	Miss West Central	Classical Vocal. "Una Voce Poco Fa"' from The Barber of Seville	2nd runner-up	Dr. David B. Allman Medical Scholarship	
1996	Kari Litton	Pontotoc	23	Miss New South	Vocal, "Cry"	Top 10		
1995	Monica Louwerens	Greenville	21	Miss Magnolia	Vocal, "Vanilla Ice Cream" from She Loves Me	Top 10	Rembrandt Award for Mentorship	
1994	Rebecca Blouin	Batesville	23	Miss Dixieland	Classical Vocal, "Quando me'n vò"	Top 10		
1993	Lenena Holder	Booneville	24	Miss Magnolia	Classical Vocal, "Un Bel Di" from Madama Butterfly		Non-finalist Talent Award Preliminary Talent Award	
1992	Kandace Williams	Tupelo	23	Miss Tupelo	Vocal, "Ain't It Good" from Children of Eden			
1991	Mary Allison Hurdle	Holly Springs	24	Miss DeSoto County	Classical Vocal, "Chi Il Bel Sogno di Doretta" from La rondine	4th runner-up		
1990	Beth Howell	Clinton	21	Miss Dixie	Magic Act		Preliminary Lifestyle & Fitness Award	Previously Mississippi's Junior Miss 1987
1989	Cherry Busby	Tupelo	19	Miss Tupelo	Vocal, "My Funny Valentine"			
1988	Carla Haag	Hattiesburg	23	Miss Dixie	Vocal Medley, "Here's to the Band" & "Alexander's Ragtime Band"	Top 10	Preliminary Lifestyle & Fitness Award	Previously Mississippi's Junior Miss 1983
1987	Toni Seawright	Moss Point	23	Miss Mississippi University for Women	Popular Vocal, "I'm Going All the Way"	4th runner-up		First African American to be crowned Miss Mississippi
1986	Kimberly McGuffee	Mendenhall	23	Miss Lamar County	Popular Vocal, "Inseparable"	Top 10		
1985	Nan Sumrall	Hattiesburg		Miss Hattiesburg		Did not compete; later assumed the title after Akin won Miss America 1986		
1985	Nan Sumrall	Hattiesburg		Miss Hattiesburg				Later known as Nan Kelley, host on Great American Country TV
1985	Susan Akin	Meridian	21	Miss University	Vocal, "You're My World"	Winner	Preliminary Lifestyle & Fitness Award	
1984	Kathy Manning	Drew	22	Miss University of Mississippi	Country Vocal, "Crazy"	2nd runner-up	Preliminary Lifestyle & Fitness Award	Later Miss Mississippi USA 1987 Top 10 at Miss USA 1987 pageant; Katharine Clare Manning Loeb died at 59 on December 23, 2021, of COVID-19 related illness in Tennessee.
1983	Wanda Geddie	Hattiesburg	24	Miss William Carey College	Vocal, "More Than You Know"	3rd runner-up	Preliminary Lifestyle & Fitness Award	
1982	Dianne Evans	Taylorsville	22	Miss William Carey College	Vocal, "Stormy Weather"	2nd runner-up	Preliminary Talent Award	
1981	Karen Hopson	Vicksburg	21	Miss Vicksburg	Character Ballet en Pointe, "Overture" from Annie	Top 10	Preliminary Lifestyle & Fitness Award	
1980	Donna Pope	McNeil	24	Miss Picayune	Ballet, "Overture" from Oklahoma!	2nd runner-up (tie)	Preliminary Lifestyle & Fitness Award	
1979	Sherye Simmons	Jackson				Did not compete; later assumed the title after Prewitt won Miss America 1980		
1979	Cheryl Prewitt	Ackerman	22	Miss Starkville	Vocal / Piano, "Don't Cry Out Loud"	Winner	Preliminary Lifestyle & Fitness Award	
1978	Cheri Brown	Meridian	21	Miss Oxford	Popular Vocal, "Evergreen"		Preliminary Lifestyle & Fitness Award (tie)	Later Miss Mississippi USA 1980
1977	Mary Donnelly	Oxford	19	Miss University	Vocal, "The Good Songs"			Wife of former Miss America Chairman of the Board, Sam Haskell
1976	Bobbye Wood	Hattiesburg	19	Miss William Carey College	Vocal, "Starting Here, Starting Now"			
1975	Mollie Magee	Mendenhall	19	Miss University of Southern Mississippi	Popular Vocal, "Lights on the Hill"			Contestant at Miss Teenage America 1972 pageant
1974	Diane Bounds	Gulfport	21	Miss Mississippi State University	Popular Vocal, "When You Smile"			
1973	Kathleen Coole	Gulfport	19	Miss Mississippi State College for Women	Vocal Medley, "Everything's Alright" & "I Don't Know How to Love Him" from Jesus Christ Superstar			
1972	Glenda Meadows	Richton	23	Miss Richton	Vocal Medley, "Am I Blue?" & "I'd Rather Be Blue"			
1971	Jennifer Blair	Tupelo	21	Miss Mississippi State University	Popular Vocal, "I Wish You Love"			
1970	Christine McClamroch	Columbus	21	Miss Columbus	Vocal Medley, "Cabaret," "Try to Remember," & "You'll Never Walk Alone"	3rd runner-up		
1969	Jane Foshee	Hattiesburg	19	Miss Hattiesburg	Vocal / Soft Shoe Dance, "Makin' Whoopee"			Previously Mississippi's Junior Miss 1967; Mother of Miss Louisiana 1998 and Miss Louisiana Teen USA 1993, Heather Dupree; Grandmothers of Miss Louisiana's Teen 2023 & 2025, Laura Jane and Virginia Kirkpatrick
1968	Mary Mills	McComb	19	Miss University of Southern Mississippi	Piano Comedy Presentation, "Habanera" & "La Poupée Valsante" by Fritz Kreisler			
1967	Joan Myers	Forest	20	Miss Mississippi College	Speech & Display of Original Art, "Doctor Zhivago"	1st runner-up		
1966	Robbie Robertson	Hattiesburg	20	Miss University of Southern Mississippi	Dramatic Reading, "Adam Bede" by George Eliot		Non-finalist Talent Award	
1965	Patricia Puckett	Columbus	20	Miss Columbus	Vocal, "I Ain't Down Yet" from The Unsinkable Molly Brown	1st runner-up	Preliminary Lifestyle & Fitness Award	Featured performer on the Miss America 1967 telecast
1964	Judy Simono	Vicksburg	20	Miss Vicksburg	Classical Ballet, The Sleeping Beauty by Tchaikovsky			
1963	Jan Nave	McComb		Miss Mississippi State College for Women	Contemporary Dance			
1962	Charlotte Ann Carroll	Walthall	19	Miss Eupora	Comedy Song & Dance Routine, "Olive Oyl"	Top 10	Preliminary Talent Award	
1961	Annice Jernigan	New Albany	21	Miss University of Mississippi	Piano Medley			
1960	Patricia McRaney	McComb	20	Miss McComb	Speech & Art Presentation		Non-finalist Talent Award	
1959	Betty Porter	Brookhaven				Did not compete; later assumed the title after Mead won Miss America 1960		
1959	Lynda Lee Mead	Natchez	20	Miss University	Original Dramatic Act, "Schizophrenia"	Winner		
1958	Margie Wilson	Itta Bena				Did not compete; later assumed the title after Mobley won Miss America 1959		
1958	Mary Ann Mobley	Brandon	21		Vocal Medley & Dance, "Un Bel Di" & "There'll Be Some Changes Made"	Winner	Preliminary Talent Award	
1957	Mary Allen	Yazoo City			Dance & Art Presentation			
1956	Martha Annette Tisdale	Hattiesburg	19		Drama			
1955	Carolyn Cochran	Lucedale			Dramatic Monologue			
1954	Celeste Luckett	Clarksdale			Drama			
1953	Suzanne Dugger	Picayune			Vocal Medley & Dance, "Bill" & "Won't You Come Home Bill Bailey"	4th runner-up		
1952	Dora Livingston	Yazoo City						
1951	Jessie Morgan	Newton			Ballet	Top 15		
1950	Annie Roberts	Hattiesburg						
1949	Katherine Wright	Pascagoula			Dramatic Sketch, "Hagar"	1st runner-up		
1948	Virginia Joyce Hollingsworth	Kosciusko	18					
1947	Kitty Bailey	Oxford			Painting			
1946	Lennie Nobles	Greenwood			Dance		Non-finalist Talent Award & Best Dancer Award	Later known as Josephine Nobles Giacketti, she died at 92 in Albertson, N.Y. on March 2, 2019.
1945	Harriet Carr	Marks			Stand-up Comedy			
1944	Sarah Topp	Tupelo						
1943	Arminta Scott	Corinth						
1942	Dorothy Fox	Columbus					Miss Congeniality	
1941	Madeline Smith	Winona						
1940	Carolyn Simon	Greenville						
1939	Doris Coggins	Baldwyn					Miss Congeniality	
1938	Frances Sykes	Aberdeen						
1937	Virginia Riley	West Point						
1936	Rachel Smith	Booneville						
1935	LeFrance Boyett	Sumner						
1934	Madolyn Hardy	Belzoni				No national pageant was held		
1933	Dorothy Ely		24			Top 18		
1932	No national pageants were held							
1931	No national pageants were held							
1930	No national pageants were held							
1929	No national pageants were held							
1928	No national pageants were held							
1927	Phyllis Hunt			Miss Biloxi				Competed under local title at Miss America pageant
1926	Mabel Riley			Miss Biloxi				Competed under local title at Miss America pageant
1925	Laurice McFarland			Miss Biloxi		Top 15		Competed under local title at Miss America pageant
1924	Vivian Ruth Shaddinger			Miss Biloxi				Multiple Mississippi representatives Contestants competed under local title at Miss America pageant
1924	Mabel Batson			Miss Jackson				Multiple Mississippi representatives Contestants competed under local title at Miss America pageant
1923	No Mississippi representative at Miss America pageant							
1922	No Mississippi representative at Miss America pageant							
1921	No Mississippi representative at Miss America pageant							
