= Cumana (song) =

"Cumana" is a mambo tune written by jazz pianist Barclay Allen, together with Harold Spina and Roc Hillman and released by Barclay Allen's Rhythm Four on Capitol 15107 in 1947. Allen also recorded the tune with Freddy Martin And His Orchestra later in the year for RCA.

The song is sometimes referred to Cumaña, Cumaná or La Cumana and described as a boogie.

== Description ==
Its signature riff is a fast moody change between two chords (chiefly F minor 6, or its tritone substitution, and C minor seventh) with some syncopation added. This tune, in its original context, is in the key of E Flat major with some parts sounding like they come from the relative key of C minor. The suggested tempo is 180 beats per minute, and this song in its original context takes about three and a half minutes to play, taking all repeats.

== Reception and legacy ==
The song is described as a "big band hit". The RCA version was described as "spin[ning] in the lively samba rhythm, Martin showcas[ing] the nimble keyboarding of Barclay Allen in fine style".

The song, described as a classic from the Hispanic repertoire, was frequently played by Liberace. Milton Nascimento also played the song on tour.

"La Cumana" has been featured on several episodes of The Lawrence Welk Show.
