= Hannah Roberts (Miss Mississippi) =

American beauty pageant titleholder

- Born: Hannah Camille Roberts; April 15, 1993 (age 33); Mount Olive, Mississippi, U.S.
- Education: University of Southern Mississippi
- Height: 5 ft 9 in (175 cm)
- Beauty pageant titleholder
- Title: Distinguished Young Woman of Mississippi 2011; Miss University of Southern Mississippi 2013; Miss University of Southern Mississippi 2015; Miss Mississippi 2015
- Years active: 1997–present
- Hair color: blonde
- Eye color: blue
- Major competition: Miss America 2016 (first runner-up)

Hannah Camille Roberts (born August 21, 1993) is an American beauty pageant titleholder from Mount Olive, Mississippi. She was named the Distinguished Young Woman of Mississippi in 2011 and crowned Miss Mississippi 2015. Roberts competed for the Miss America 2016 title on September 13, 2015, and was named first runner-up.

== Pageant career ==
=== Early pageants ===
In July 2010, Roberts won the Covington County's Junior Miss title and competed in July 2010 finals for the state Distinguished Young Woman title. After two days of competition in talent, fitness, scholastic achievement, and self-expression, Roberts was named Distinguished Young Woman of Mississippi 2011. She earned a $10,000 scholarship prize from the Mississippi Junior Miss Scholarship Foundation and the right to compete for the national title. Roberts was named second runner-up for the national title in June 2011, earning a $15,000 scholarship prize. She also won $1,000 scholarships for scholastic and talent category awards plus $1,500 for winning the Bel Air Mall Community Service Award.

In October 2012, Roberts won the Miss University of Southern Mississippi 2013 title. She competed in the Miss Mississippi pageant in July 2013 with the platform "Pages of Love" and a classical violin performance in the talent portion of the competition. She was named first runner-up to winner Chelsea Rick. Roberts skipped the 2014 competition season to focus on her studies.

=== Miss Mississippi 2015 ===
In October 2014, Roberts was crowned Miss University of Southern Mississippi 2015 which made her eligible to compete at the 2015 Miss Mississippi pageant. She entered the state pageant at the Vicksburg Convention Center in June 2015 as one of 30 qualifiers. Roberts's competition talent was a shred of the classical violin performance of a variation around "Zapateado" by Pablo de Sarasate, Op. 23 No. 2. Her platform is "Pages of Love", donating more than 25,000 books to children's hospitals, shelters, and schools. Roberts won the competition on Saturday, June 27, 2015, when she received her crown from outgoing Miss Mississippi titleholder Jasmine Murray. She earned more than $10,000 in scholarship money, use of an automobile, and other prizes from the state pageant. As Miss Mississippi, her activities include public appearances across the state of Mississippi.

=== Vying for Miss America ===
Roberts was Mississippi's representative at the Miss America 2016 pageant in Atlantic City, New Jersey, in September 2015. In the televised finale on September 13, 2015, she performed a violin solo in the talent portion of the competition and her interview question was about controversial county clerk Kim Davis. Roberts was named first runner-up to Betty Cantrell and awarded a $25,000 scholarship prize. In addition, Roberts was awarded the $500 Louanne Gamba Non-Finalist Instrumentalist scholarship for her classical violin performance. However, her performance of Pablo de Sarasate's Zapateado has been widely criticized by members of the music community, who have noted that her performance was riddled with errors and severely lacked the technique, musicianship, and knowledge of the correct notes and rhythms required for the virtuosic piece she intended to play.

== Personal life and education ==
Roberts is a native of Mount Olive, Mississippi, and a 2011 graduate of Sumrall High School. Her father is James Roberts and her mother is Danna Warren Roberts.

Roberts is a May 2015 graduate of the University of Southern Mississippi where she majored in biochemistry with a minor in biology. She was a recipient of the Barry M. Goldwater Scholarship for undergraduates planning a career in science. While a student at USM, Roberts became a member of the Kappa Delta sorority. She graduated medical school from the University of Mississippi Medical Center in Jackson, Mississippi in May 2020 where she is a Dermatology resident.

Awards and achievements
| Preceded by Katie Thurber | Distinguished Young Woman of Mississippi; 2011 | Succeeded by Mallory Pitts |
| Preceded by Jasmine Murray | Miss Mississippi; 2015 | Succeeded by Laura Lee Lewis |
