= Susan Akin =

American pageant titleholder

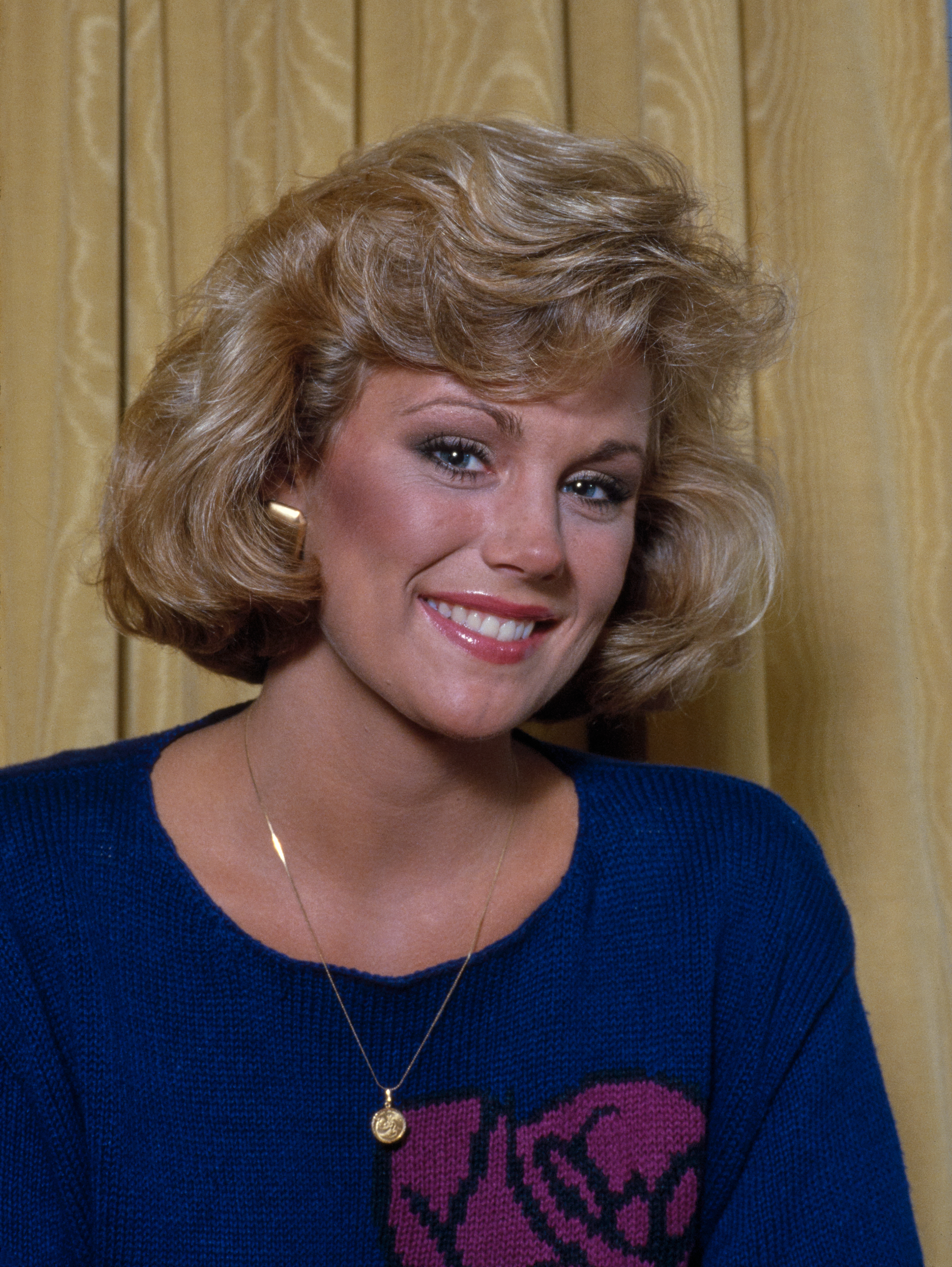
- Akin, 1985
- Born: August 12, 1964 (age 62); Meridian, Mississippi
- Education: University of Mississippi
- Title: Miss University 1985; Miss Mississippi 1985; Miss America 1986
- Predecessor: Sharlene Wells
- Successor: Kellye Cash
- Spouses: Jetson Taylor (m. 1990; div. 1994) Brooks Lynch (m. 1996)
- Children: 2

Susan Akin (born August 12, 1964) is an American beauty pageant titleholder from Meridian, Mississippi who was Miss Mississippi 1985 and Miss America 1986.

== Early life and education ==
Akin was born to Earl and Dorothy (Parkerson) Akin on August 12, 1964. She is the second of three children. Her younger sister Janet Leigh Akin (1969-1980) was afflicted with Down's Syndrome. She was a member of Pi Beta Phi sorority at the University of Mississippi.

== Pageantry ==
Before the Miss America 1986 pageant, computer modeling successfully predicted that Akin would be named Miss America, her odds set at 7 to 1. Included in her pageant history she earned a Top Ten spot in the first children’s pageant of its kind, World’s Our Little Miss. During her pageant years, Akin participated in over 110 pageants.

== Career ==
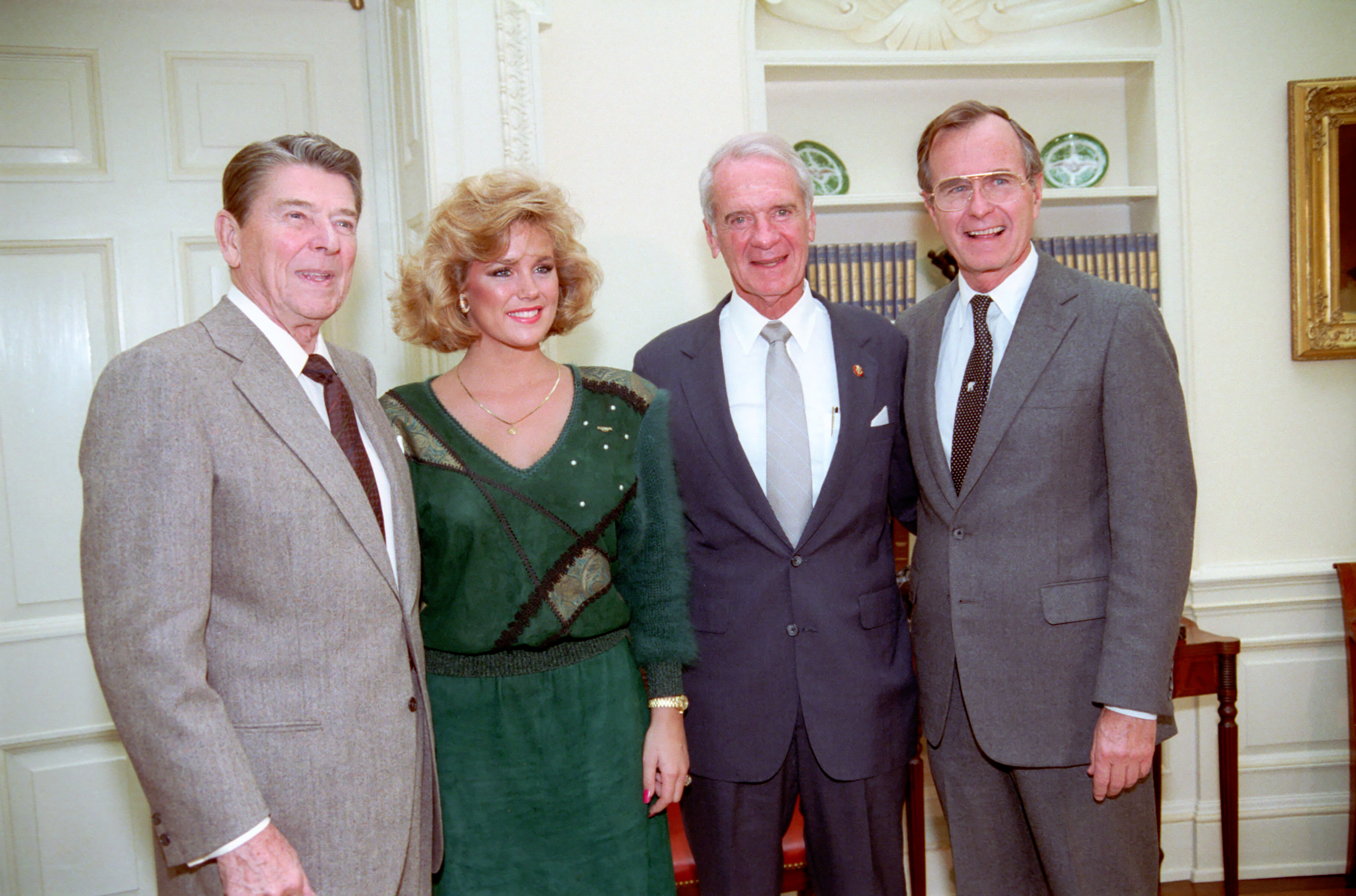
Akin with (LtR) President Ronald Reagan, Sonny Montgomery, George H. W. Bush in 1985

Akin traveled extensively with Bob Hope, performing at conventions both in Las Vegas and Atlantic City, New Jersey.

Akin was formerly the spokesperson for the National Down's Syndrome Association, during which she spoke before state legislatures and advocacy groups.

In 1991, Akin appeared in a segment on Unsolved Mysteries to discuss the unexplained death of Crystal Spencer, an aspiring actress who died in the same apartment building where Akin and her husband, Jet Taylor, lived in 1988.

== Controversies ==
She is the granddaughter of Bernard L. Akin, a conspirator in the murders of Chaney, Goodman, and Schwerner of 1964. The Meridian Star reported Akin's response to her grandfather's involvement, "That's something that doesn't involve me. I wasn't even born and can't be involved in this. And the people who have taken it out of context thinking they can drag me down, cannot and they're not."

Akin openly opposed mixed marriages with the New York Press quoting her as saying, "I feel at this time intermixing could lead to more problems."

== Personal life ==
After crowning Kellye Cash as her successor, Akin moved to Los Angeles in 1987 to pursue a career in acting, but soon fell into alcoholism. In the late 1980s, Akin became addicted to opiates after being injured in a car accident. She moved back to Mississippi and soon married Jetson "Jet" Taylor and gave birth to a daughter, Alexandria, in 1992. Taylor and Akin divorced in 1994.

In 1996, Akin married Brooks Lynch. She continued to struggle with addiction, ultimately leading to a suicide attempt in 1999.

Akin and Lynch had a son, Preston Lynch, in 2001.

Awards and achievements
| Preceded by Sharlene Wells | Miss America; 1986 | Succeeded by Kellye Cash |
| Preceded by Kathy Manning | Miss Mississippi; 1985 | Succeeded by Nan Sumrall |
