= Nan Kelley =

Nan Kelley (born Nan Sumrall) is a former Miss Mississippi (1985) who later became a host and correspondent for the Great American Country (GAC) cable television network.

== Early life and career ==
A native of Hattiesburg, Mississippi, Kelley initially finished first runner-up in the 1985 Miss Mississippi pageant to Susan Akin, but became Miss Mississippi when Akin was named Miss America that year. Following her service, she received her degree from college in Communications, and then worked as an entertainer for the United States Department of Defense. While at the Defense Department, Kelley entertained troops in the Middle East, Europe, Alaska, and the Caribbean.

== Move to Nashville ==
Kelley moved to Nashville, Tennessee where she performed at Opryland. Later, she worked for record producer Blake Mevis, the first producer for 2006 Country Music Hall of Fame inductee George Strait. After spending time in the recording studio and on stage, Kelley moved to broadcasting working for Dick Clark Productions as a producer for Prime Time Country on The Nashville Network (Spike TV since August 2003.) Later Kelley worked as a host for the Shop At Home Network before joining GAC as host of Grand Ole Opry Live on October 4, 2003.

== Work at GAC ==
In addition to hosting Grand Ole Opry Live, Kelley also hosts GAC's Top 20 Country Countdown which deals with the top twenty videos in country music on the network for a particular week that is voted on by GAC viewers. She also hosts a show called My Music Mix where they interview an artist's favorite music video, both of their own and others. When Hurricane Katrina hit Alabama, Louisiana, and Mississippi on August 29, 2005, Kelley hosted a benefit concert that was simulcast on two other E.W. Scripps' television networks (DIY Network and Fine Living) titled Country Reaches Out: An Opry and GAC Benefit for the American Red Cross.

== Personal life ==
Kelley is married to Grammy-nominated record producer Charlie Kelley and lives in Nashville. The couple owns two dogs.

Kelley revealed in May 2008 on GAC's Top 20 Country Countdown that she had Hodgkin lymphoma. In November 2008, she announced on GAC's Top 20 Country Countdown that she has made a complete recovery from her cancer.

Awards and achievements
Preceded by Susan Akin	Miss Mississippi; 1985	Succeeded by Kimberly McGuffee
