= Germany Kent =

American television personality

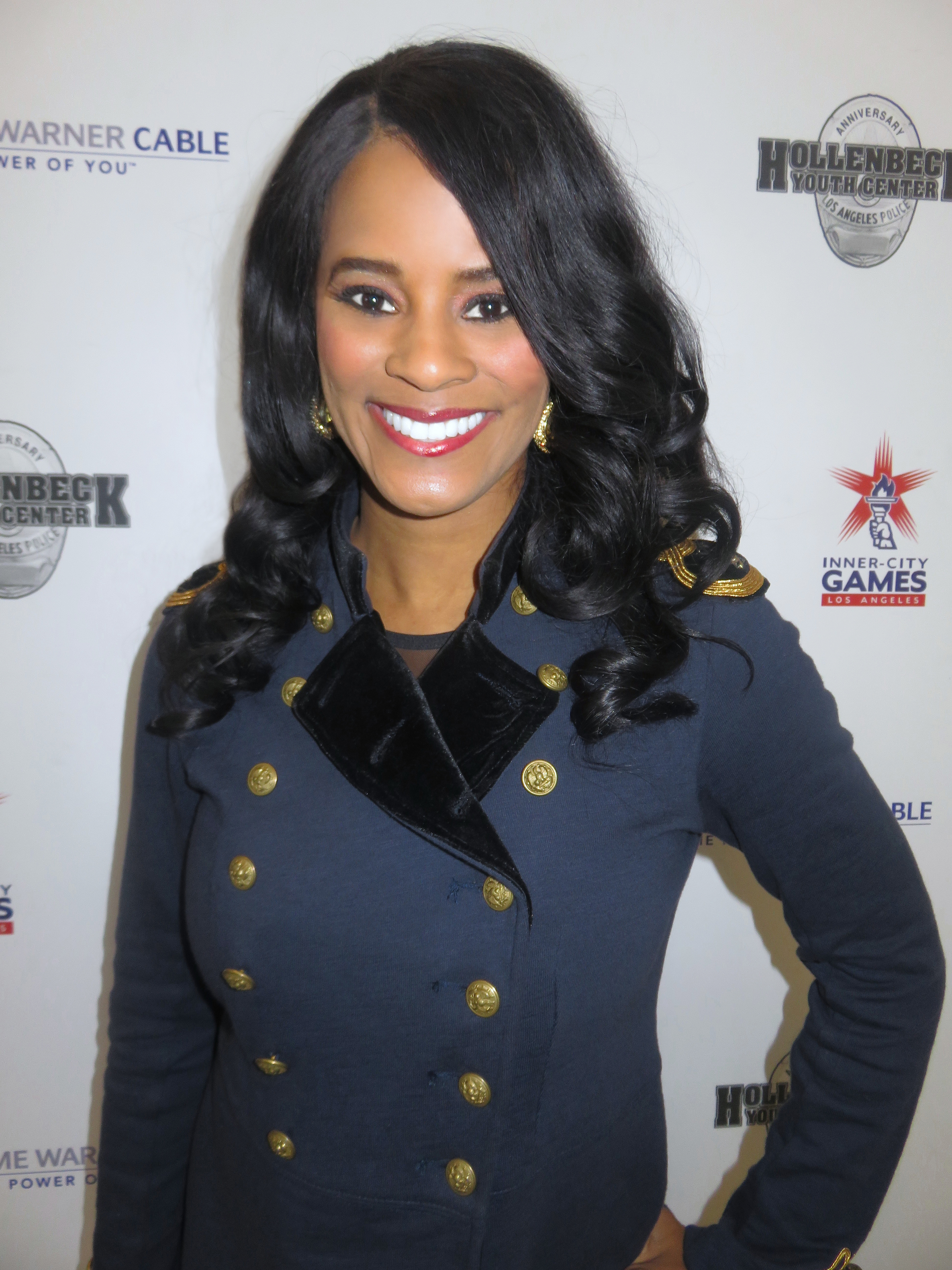
- Kent in 2016
- Born: Evelyn Palmer
- Education: Mississippi State University
- Occupations: Journalist; Author; Actress; Television Personality; Producer; Activist; Philanthropist

Germany Kent (born Evelyn Palmer) is an American journalist, author, actor, producer, and philanthropist.

== Early life and education ==
Kent graduated from Mississippi State University with a bachelor's degree in journalism and marketing. While there, she was elected as the attorney general of the Student Association. She went on to earn a master's degree in administration with a minor in public relations at the University of Alabama.

After completing her studies, Kent worked as a VIP tour guide at Walt Disney World and graduated from the Disney Institute.

== Journalism ==
=== Print ===
Kent has written on topics including social media branding, marketing strategies, social media ethics, and business etiquette. Her work has appeared in Forbes, Yahoo News, and HuffPost, among other publications.

=== Arts and entertainment ===
In October 2015, Kent joined the news team at 50 Plus Report as a producer, reporter, and host. Kent anchored the nightly news for the FOX affiliate KARD 14 (myarklamiss) in West Monroe, Louisiana, and has worked as a freelance reporter and host for other media outlets.

In 2013, Kent was a guest correspondent for Real TV Films at the Celebrity World Challenge Golf Championship in Calabasas, California.

While based in Los Angeles, Kent received the Sigma Delta Chi Award for Online Deadline Reporting (Independent) for her coverage of the Thousand Oaks shooting on November 7, 2018.

In June 2019, she was recognized for distinguished service to journalism through outstanding accomplishments in the field by the Society of Professional Journalists at the National Press Club in Washington, D. C.

== Acting ==
Kent has appeared on-screen in cameo roles and as a featured actor. She has appeared in nationally broadcast television commercials, including spots for Nike, Verizon, Carrier, and Coors Light. Kent has also starred in Disney advertisements & has provided voice-over work for the Disney brand. In 2012, Kent appeared as a contestant on the Christmas Edition of Let's Make a Deal. The same year, she had a guest role as a person struggling with drug addiction on the USA Network television series Graceland. In 2013, she appeared in a reality TV series for the Food Network alongside celebrity chef Robert Irvine. Kent has also appeared on The Doctors, Criminal Minds and The Real Housewives of Atlanta.

In 2012, Kent appeared in the music video for "Why" by singer-songwriter Mary J. Blige. In 2011, Kent appeared in the music video for "One" by musical group Take 6.

== Writing ==
In March 2015, Kent published a book titled The Hope Handbook, which contained a collection of tweets that Kent had previously posted on X (formerly known as Twitter).

Following the publication of The Hope Handbook, Kent released a series of books titled The Hope Handbook Series.

In May 2015, Kent released You Are What You Tweet. In March 2017, the book was one of four selected by actor Romany Malco to be sent to the White House as part of a campaign regarding social media etiquette for President Donald Trump.

In June 2017, Kent collaborated with author and publisher Rhonda Branch Yearby on the book Women Of Faith: Their Untold Stories Revealed: Teen Edition: Bully & Cyber Bullying Prevention.

== Published works ==
- You Are What You Tweet: Harness The Power of Twitter to Create a Happier, Healthier Life ISBN 978-0996146890
- The Hope Handbook: The Search for Personal Growth ISBN 9780996146876
- The Hope Handbook for Couples: The Search for Personal Growth ISBN 9781943206100
- The Hope Handbook for Moms: The Search for Personal Growth ISBN 9780996146852
- The Hope Handbook for Dads: The Search for Personal Growth ISBN 9781943206001
- The Hope Handbook for Christians: The Search for Personal Growth ISBN 9780996146821
- The Hope Handbook for Singles: The Search for Personal Growth ISBN 9781943206063
- The Hope Handbook for Survivors: The Search for Personal Growth ISBN 9781943206070
- The Hope Handbook for Mentors and Coaches: The Search for Personal Growth ISBN 9781943206049
- The Hope Handbook for Leaders: The Search for Personal Growth ISBN 9781943206025
- Women of Faith: Their Untold Stories Revealed: Teen Edition: Bully & Cyber Bullying Prevention ISBN 9781548467302
