= Taryn Foshee =

American model

- Born: Taryn Leigh Foshee; April 3, 1985 (age 41); Clinton, Mississippi, U.S.
- Education: Mississippi State University
- Beauty pageant titleholder
- Title: Miss Clinton 2003; Miss Byram Tri County 2006; Miss Mississippi 2006
- Hair color: Brunette
- Eye color: Gray
- Major competition: Miss America 2007 (3rd runner-up)
- Website: www.tarynfoshee.com

Taryn Foshee Ward (born April 3, 1985) is a beauty queen from Clinton, Mississippi who won the Miss Clinton 2003 pageant while a pupil at Hillcrest Christian School in Jackson and received a commendation from the Mississippi Legislature.

Subsequently, Foshee won the Miss Mississippi 2006 pageant, and later placed as third runner-up in the Miss America 2007 pageant on January 29, 2007 in Las Vegas, Nevada.

Awards and achievements
Preceded by Kristian Dambrino	Miss Mississippi; 2006	Succeeded by Kimberly Morgan
