= Christine Kozlowski =

American beauty pageant titleholder (born 1988)

- Born: Christine Kozlowski; October 1, 1988 (age 38); D'Iberville, Mississippi, USA
- Beauty pageant titleholder
- Title: Miss Mississippi 2008
- Major competition: Miss America 2009

Christine Kozlowski is an American beauty pageant titleholder who was crowned Miss Mississippi on June 28, 2008. Kozlowski, a native of D'Iberville, is of Polish and Latina descent and is the first Miss Mississippi of Latina heritage.

Kozlowski participated in Miss Mississippi as "Miss Gulf Coast". At the time of her win, she was a sophomore nutrition and dietetics major at the University of Southern Mississippi. Her platform is diabetes awareness. She was awarded a Preliminary Swimsuit Award at the 2009 Miss America Pageant.

On October 1, 2014, Kozlowski was proposed to at a One Direction concert in Atlanta, GA. Her then boyfriend, Bradley Chisenhall, contacted 1D member Harry Styles to help with the proposal. The proposal was the top trend in the world from October 1 to October 3. Interviews with CNN and Fuse TV followed. On November 7, 2014, she married Chisenhall in a private wedding in Alabama. It was confirmed via Twitter that the two have separated after less than a year of marriage.

Kozlowski and her family are survivors of Hurricane Katrina.

Kozlowski has had some success as an actress.

Awards
Preceded by Kimberly Morgan	Miss Mississippi; 2008	Succeeded by Anna Tadlock
