= Jasmine Murray =

American singer

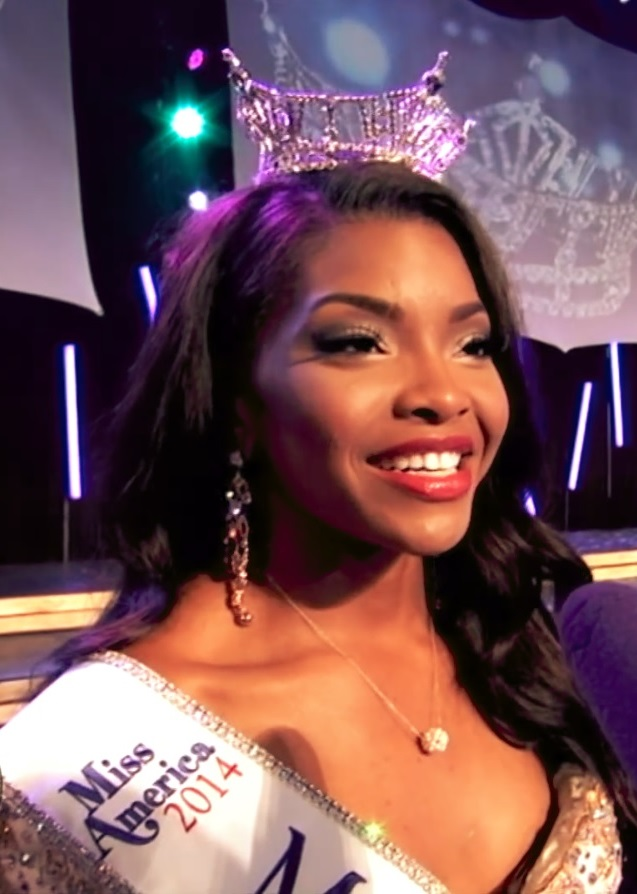
- Jasmine Murray interviewed after winning 2014 Miss Mississippi

Background information
- Born: December 12, 1991 (age 34); Columbus, Mississippi, U.S.
- Origin: Starkville, Mississippi
- Genres: Pop
- Occupations: Singer, beauty queen
- Instrument: Vocals
- Years active: 2006—present
- Label: Fair Trade
- Spouse: Jon Vernak (m. 2022)

Jasmine S. Murray (born December 12, 1991) is an American singer and beauty pageant titleholder. She is best known for being a finalist on the eighth season of American Idol where she placed 12th–13th alongside Jorge Núñez. She also competed in the Miss America's Outstanding Teen pageant in 2007. Her musical influences include Christina Aguilera. On July 12, 2014, Murray was crowned Miss Mississippi 2014.

== Early life ==
Jasmine Murray was born in Columbus, Mississippi and attended Columbus High School, but later moved to Starkville with her family. She is the daughter of Lisa Murray and is the youngest of five children. Her mother's first husband died of a brain aneurysm in 1978. Her parents divorced when she was a toddler, and her father lives outside the state of Mississippi. According to the audition segments, she is eleven years younger than the fourth. At the time of the pregnancy, her mother Lisa Murray was working the night shift at the Weyerhaeuser plant in Columbus, Mississippi, and was lethargic and noticed her body swelling. Lisa Murray went to the plant's on-site clinic, but nurses rushed her to the hospital. She suffered a severe form of pre-eclampsia when pregnant with Jasmine, and the doctors expected neither of them to survive the pregnancy. Shortly after birth, Jasmine remained in the hospital for nearly a month fighting for her life. She began to sing at age 3. Her family told her that once they were in a vehicle, she would start singing with the radio, and that describes why she is passionate about singing. She has also performed mini-concerts with the Murray family. Before her American Idol run, she competed in the Miss America's Outstanding Teen scholarship pageant and was a student at the Mississippi School of the Arts, where she was continuing her education until she graduated in 2010.

== Career ==
=== Miss America's Outstanding Teen ===
Murray competed in the Miss Mississippi's Outstanding Teen pageant in 2006 where she won the activewear preliminary award and placed fourth runner-up. The following year, competing as Miss Houston/North Central, she won the Miss Mississippi's Outstanding Teen title. In August of that year she represented Mississippi in the Miss America's Outstanding teen pageant, the teen version of Miss America, where she placed tenth. In 2008 she won first place for the pageant's Mentor Club Scholarship, an opportunity open to former contestants.

=== American Idol ===
She auditioned for the eighth season of American Idol in Jacksonville, Florida on a whim after traveling to Orlando, Florida to attend the 2008 Miss America's Outstanding Teen pageant. Holding number 84122, she sang "Big Girls Don't Cry" by Fergie. During Hollywood group night, her group, dubbed "Team Diva", performed "Mercy" by Duffy, but the rest of her group was cut. She then sang "Love Song" by Sara Bareilles, but the judges were not so impressed with Randy Jackson stating that he would not have chosen the song for her and suggested that she should have sung a song by Rihanna.

Murray was originally eliminated in the second semi-final, but was brought back for the wild card round and the judges chose her to join the Top 13. During the top 13 week, she performed "I'll Be There" by The Jackson 5, with Simon Cowell giving a minor critique that it was "a little bit robotic at times." She was one of the first two contestants to be eliminated in the finals along with Jorge Núñez and was the second wild card finalist to be eliminated in the first episode of the finals in American Idol history, after Leah LaBelle. As a result, she missed out on the annual summer tour. American Idol's African-American viewer ratings dropped by 28% in the episode following Murray's elimination. Murray was the only contestant from Mississippi to become a finalist in American Idol history, until being joined by Skylar Laine in season 11, who is her favorite of that season. Among finalists, she is a close friend of Alexis Grace and Allison Iraheta.

==== Performances/Results ====
Week #	Theme	Song choice	Original artist	Order #	Result
Audition	N/A	"Big Girls Don't Cry"	Fergie	N/A	Advanced
Hollywood	First Solo	"The Trouble with Love Is"	Kelly Clarkson	N/A	Advanced
Hollywood	Group Performance	"Mercy"	Duffy	N/A	Advanced
Hollywood	Second Solo	"Tattoo"	Jordin Sparks	N/A	Advanced
Top 36/Semi-Final 2	Billboard Hot 100 Hits to Date	"Love Song"	Sara Bareilles	1	Eliminated^{1}
Wild Card	N/A	"Reflection"	Christina Aguilera	5	Selected
Top 13	Michael Jackson	"I'll Be There"	The Jackson 5	5	Eliminated^{2}

- Note 1: Murray was initially eliminated, as she did not receive enough votes to advance immediately to the Top 12. However, on the March 4 results show, Kara DioGuardi selected her as one of the 8 Wild Card contenders.
- Note 2: It was never revealed between Murray and Jorge Núñez who was the bottom vote-getter, though Murray was announced as the first to be eliminated.

=== Post-Idol ===
Murray has been on The Ellen DeGeneres Show and Live with Regis and Kelly with also-cast-off contestant Jorge Núñez. While missing out on the American Idols Live! Tour 2009, Murray also performed Beyoncé song Single Ladies (Put A Ring On It) at the 2009 Mary Kay Seminar. Later during the time of the tour, she performed the Jordin Sparks song "Battlefield", the Rihanna song "Unfaithful", and the Fergie song "Big Girls Don't Cry" at the Delta Fair in Memphis, Tennessee. Fellow season 8 finalist Alexis Grace also performed there. Murray did performances at the 2009 Miss America's Outstanding Teen pageant. Since her stint on American Idol, she is a popular attraction at pageants and sporting events. She worked with seasoned songwriters in Nashville, Tennessee.

Murray performed in the national anthem at a Michigan State basketball game.

On February 12, 2012, Murray was crowned Miss Spirit of the South 2012. She announced it on Twitter and posted a photograph of herself wearing the new crown. She also announced that she would compete in Miss Mississippi 2012, held on June 27–30. She won first runner up in the contest. In April 2012, she visited and performed at Batson Children's Hospital in Jackson, Mississippi and performed three songs for patients in the hospital's lobby. On October 26, 2012, Murray was crowned Miss Mississippi State University.

=== Miss Mississippi ===
In July 2014, Murray participated in her third Miss Mississippi pageant. Competing as Miss Riverland, she was crowned Miss Mississippi 2014 on Saturday, July 12, winning a $10,000 scholarship.

Murray's platform is "13 Going on 30," aimed at teaching young girls to embrace their age. She competed at the Miss America 2015 pageant on September 14 in Atlantic City, New Jersey and placed in the top 10.

== Discography ==
=== Singles ===
Year	Single	Chart Positions			Album
Year	Single	US Chr Songs	US Chr Airplay	US Chr Digital	Album
2017	"Fearless"	12	9	6	Fearless
2017	"For God So Loved"	27	10	—	Non-album single
2018	"No Other Love"	—	34	—	Fearless
2019	"While You Were Holding Me"	—	—	—	Fearless

=== Albums ===
Year	Album details	Peak chart positions
Year	Album details	US Heat
2018	Fearless: Released: June 15, 2018; Label: Fair Trade	21

=== EPs ===
- Jasmine Murray EP (September 29, 2017)

Awards and achievements
Preceded by Chelsea Rick	Miss Mississippi; 2014	Succeeded by Hannah Roberts
