= Lynn Franklin (writer, born 1922) =

American author and police detective

- Born: December 19, 1922; Mississippi, United States
- Died: 2005 (aged 82–83)
- Occupations: Author, Beverly Hills Police Detective
- Notable work: The Beverly Hills Murder File, Sawed-off Justice

Lynn Franklin (December 19, 1922 in Mississippi – 2005) was an American author, and the most highly decorated officer in Beverly Hills Police history. He is most famous for being the Beverly Hills Police detective who pulled over a car containing Robert F. Kennedy, Peter Lawford, and Ralph Greenson (Lawford was behind the wheel), the night he claims Marilyn Monroe was killed. He received the Clinton H. Anderson Award.

== Bibliography ==
- Sawed-off Justice, 1976
- The Beverly Hills Murder File, 1999
