= Susan Hendricks =

American television news anchor

- Born: August 29, 1973 (age 51)
- Education: Arizona State University
- Occupation: CNN News anchor
- Notable credit(s): HLN; Morning Express with Robin Meade
- Spouse: Joe Carter
- Children: 2

Susan Hendricks (born August 29, 1973) is a former anchor for HLN and substitute anchor for CNN based in CNN's world headquarters in Atlanta. Hendricks also used to appear occasionally on CNN Pipeline, CNN.com's on-demand broadband news service. She was named new host on Weekend Express replacing Lynn Smith who took over On the Story. She also would fill in for Robin Meade on Morning Express with Robin Meade until the show's cancellation in 2022.

== Biography ==
Hendricks graduated in 1991 from the Hun School of Princeton in Princeton, New Jersey. She earned a bachelor's degree in mass communications from Arizona State University.

Hendricks decided to pursue a career in television journalism after hearing Walter Cronkite speak in one of her journalism courses at Arizona State University. She started her news career in Orange County, California, at Comcast Cable then headed to KESQ in Palm Springs where she was a field reporter. It was at KESQ that Hendricks was able to meet the source of her inspiration, and interviewed Walter Cronkite for a piece on KESQ.

After two years in the field she joined the NBC affiliate KMIR where she anchored a two-hour morning show. After a few years with KMIR, she headed to Atlanta and joined CNN Headline News where she anchored the weekend and primetime news shows as well. She covered breaking stories. Hendricks also acted as an entertainment correspondent. While at CNN, she also anchored a CNN interactive news site on CNN.com.

Hendricks moved back to Los Angeles from Atlanta to be part of an interactive news channel on DirecTV. However, her work schedule and limited public exposure encouraged her to return to Headline News in September 2005.

Susan has also become noted as a crime-victims advocate, getting particular recognition for her work on the Delphi murders of two young girls in 2017.

== Personal life ==
She is currently living in Atlanta, and is married to former HLN and CNN sports anchor Joe Carter. They have one son, Jackson Patrick Carter, born in 2016. She also has a daughter, Emery, from a previous marriage. Joe and Susan are involved in multiple business and philanthropy endeavors.

== Published works ==
- Hendricks, Susan (September 19, 2023). Down the Hill: My Descent into the Double Murder in Delphi. Hachette Books. ISBN 9780306830242.
