= Natasha Curry =

American journalist and television host

- Born: Natasha Vantramp; Puyallup, Washington
- Education: Pacific Lutheran University, Sichuan University, Arizona State University
- Occupations: Journalist, Television Talk Show Host
- Notable credit(s): HLN's Weekend Express with Natasha Curry, fill-in host for Robin Meade on Morning Express with Robin Meade

Natasha Curry is the former anchor for HLN's Weekend Express with Natasha Curry. She also served as a replacement on the same network, when necessary, for Robin Meade on Morning Express with Robin Meade. She joined the network, then known as CNN's Headline News, in December 2008.

== Personal ==
Curry received a bachelor's degree in biology from Pacific Lutheran University in Tacoma, Washington. She has studied at the Sichuan Union University in China and the Walter Cronkite School of Journalism at Arizona State University.

In 1998, Curry finished in the Top 10 in the Miss USA 1998 Pageant representing the state of Washington.

Curry served as a judge for the Miss USA 2018

== Career ==
Prior to joining CNN in 2008, Curry was a morning anchor at KOMO-TV and co-host of Northwest Afternoon in Seattle.

She was also anchored newscasts for WLTX-TV in Columbia, South Carolina. While in the palmetto state, Curry also produced the popular Midlands segment Restaurant Report Card, covered the death of Senator Strom Thurmond, and the loss of space shuttle Columbia (STS-107). She also reported on a number of controversial issues, including protests over the Confederate flag being flown on State House grounds.

Curry also worked as an anchor and reporter at KYMA-TV in Yuma, Arizona.

== Filmography ==
| 2007 | Nixon | Fox News Reporter |
| 2013 | 40th Daytime Emmy Awards | Self |
| 2019 | The Fix (2019 TV series) | Morning Host |
