= Titilayo Adedokun =

American singer and beauty queen

- Born: Titilayo Rachel Adedokun; 1973 (age 52–53); Nashville, Tennessee, U.S.
- Education: Judson College; Cincinnati Conservatory of Music
- Occupation: singer
- Years active: 1996–present
- Title: Miss Ohio 1993
- Predecessor: Robin Meade
- Successor: Lea Mack
- Spouse: Ruediger Helm
- Children: 3
- Website: titilayoadedokun.com

Titilayo Rachel Adedokun (born 1973) is an American singer and beauty pageant titleholder. She sang in numerous opera roles worldwide and has also recorded and collaborated in several jazz albums.

== Early life and education ==
Adedokun was born in Nashville, Tennessee, to Nigerian parents. Her father was a pastor with a doctorate in theology, so she grew up from childhood with church music. She is a graduate of the Cincinnati Conservatory of Music, where she studied singing. She also earned a Bachelor of Arts in English from Judson College in Marion, Alabama. After winning the 1996/97 Rotary International Ambassadorial Scholarship to Milan, Italy, she lived for five years there and studied classical singing with Vincenzo Manno and Renata Scotto. She also worked with the jazz pianist and composer Giorgio Gaslini.

== Pageantry ==
When Adedokun was at the Judson College in Marion, Alabama, a teacher persuaded her to take part in a beauty contest. At the first competition in Marion, she was far behind. Adedokun took this decision "very racist" and proceeded to compete at the Miss Alabama pageant, where she emerged fifth position in the 1990 finalists. She then participated in another beauty contest in 1993 where she was crowned Miss Ohio, and later became second runner-up in the Miss America pageant in 1994. Adedokun used her prize winnings to finance her vocal training in Italy.

== Singing ==
In 2002, she was engaged for the first time in Germany. She appeared at the opera festival on Immling Estate in Halfing, Bavaria. The following year, she performed in Germany the role of Giulietta in The Tales of Hoffmann. To mark the centenary of Verdi's death, she sang in the Franco Zeffirelli staging of Aida at Teatro Giuseppe Verdi in Busseto, Italy, in the title role.

Adedokun played roles in La bohème, Carmen, The Tales of Hoffmann, The Magic Flute, Porgy and Bess and Boccaccio. She has appeared in the United States, Italy, Germany, Austria, Switzerland, Russia and Hungary. In 2008, she starred in several German cities in a touring performance of Kiss Me, Kate.

Since 2009, Adedokun performs regularly at the festival Munich Swings. Some of her songs have been recorded in the Yoruba language.

== Personal life ==
Adedokun has lived in Munich since 2003, and has three children.

== Discography ==
- A Child Again (GLM, 2009)
- Look at Me (Downhill, 2014)
- Don't Give Up (Flip Top, 2025)

=== As guest ===
- Giorgio Gaslini, Duke Ellington Legend (Agora, 2000)
