= 40th Daytime Emmy Awards =

- Promotional poster
- Awarded for: Outstanding achievement in all fields of daytime television
- Date: June 16, 2013
- Location: Beverly Hilton Hotel; Beverly Hills, Los Angeles, California, U.S.
- Presented by: National Academy of Television Arts and Sciences
- Hosted by: Sam Champion; A.J. Hammer; Robin Meade
- Preshow hosts: A.J. Hammer; Christi Paul

Highlights
- Most awards: The Bold and the Beautiful (4)
- Most nominations: The Young and the Restless (23)
- Outstanding Drama Series: Days of Our Lives
- Outstanding Game Show: The Price Is Right
- Website: emmyonline.org

Television/radio coverage
- Network: HLN
- Produced by: Gabriel Gornell

The 40th Daytime Emmy Awards, presented by the National Academy of Television Arts and Sciences (NATAS), "recognizes outstanding achievement in all fields of daytime television production and are presented to individuals and programs broadcast from 2:00 a.m. to 6:00 p.m. during the 2012 calendar year". The ceremony took place on June 16, 2013, at The Beverly Hilton, in Beverly Hills, California beginning at 5:00 p.m. PST / 8:00 p.m. EST. The ceremony was televised in the United States by HLN and executive produced by Gabriel Gornell.

The evening was hosted by Sam Champion, A. J. Hammer and Robin Meade for the first time and the pre-show ceremony was hosted by Hammer and Christi Paul. The drama pre-nominees were announced on February 27, 2013, and the nominations were announced during an episode of Good Morning America on May 1, 2013.

The acceptance speech format was altered to add live on-stage interviews with recipients directly following their acceptance speeches for the first time in award show history. In related events, the 40th Annual Creative Arts Emmy Awards ceremony was held at the Westin Bonaventure in Los Angeles on June 14, 2013.

The Bold and the Beautiful won the most awards, with four trophies including for Outstanding Drama Series Directing Team and five other Creative Arts Emmy Awards out of their 11 nominations. Days of Our Lives won two awards including Outstanding Drama Series. The Ellen DeGeneres Show won its fourth award in the Outstanding Talk Show Entertainment category. The Young and the Restless had received the most nominations, with a total of 23 (including Creative Arts Emmy Awards). Steve Harvey received two nominations for hosting duties, one in Outstanding Game Show Host for Family Feud and the other in Outstanding Talk Show Host for Steve Harvey. The Lifetime Achievement Awards were presented to Monty Hall and Bob Stewart. The ceremony attracted 913,000 viewers.

== Winners and nominees ==
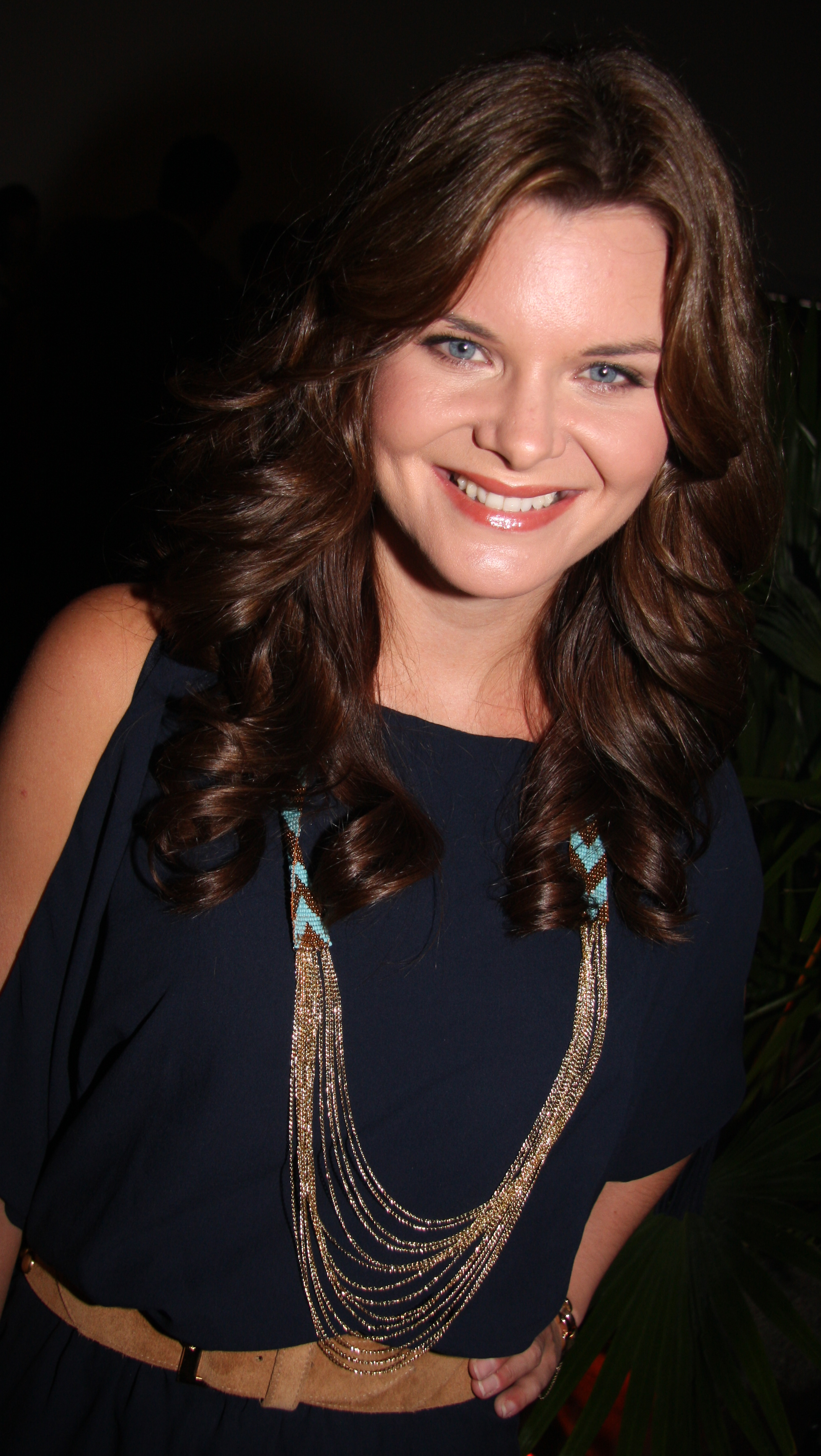
Heather Tom, Outstanding Lead Actress in a Drama Series winner

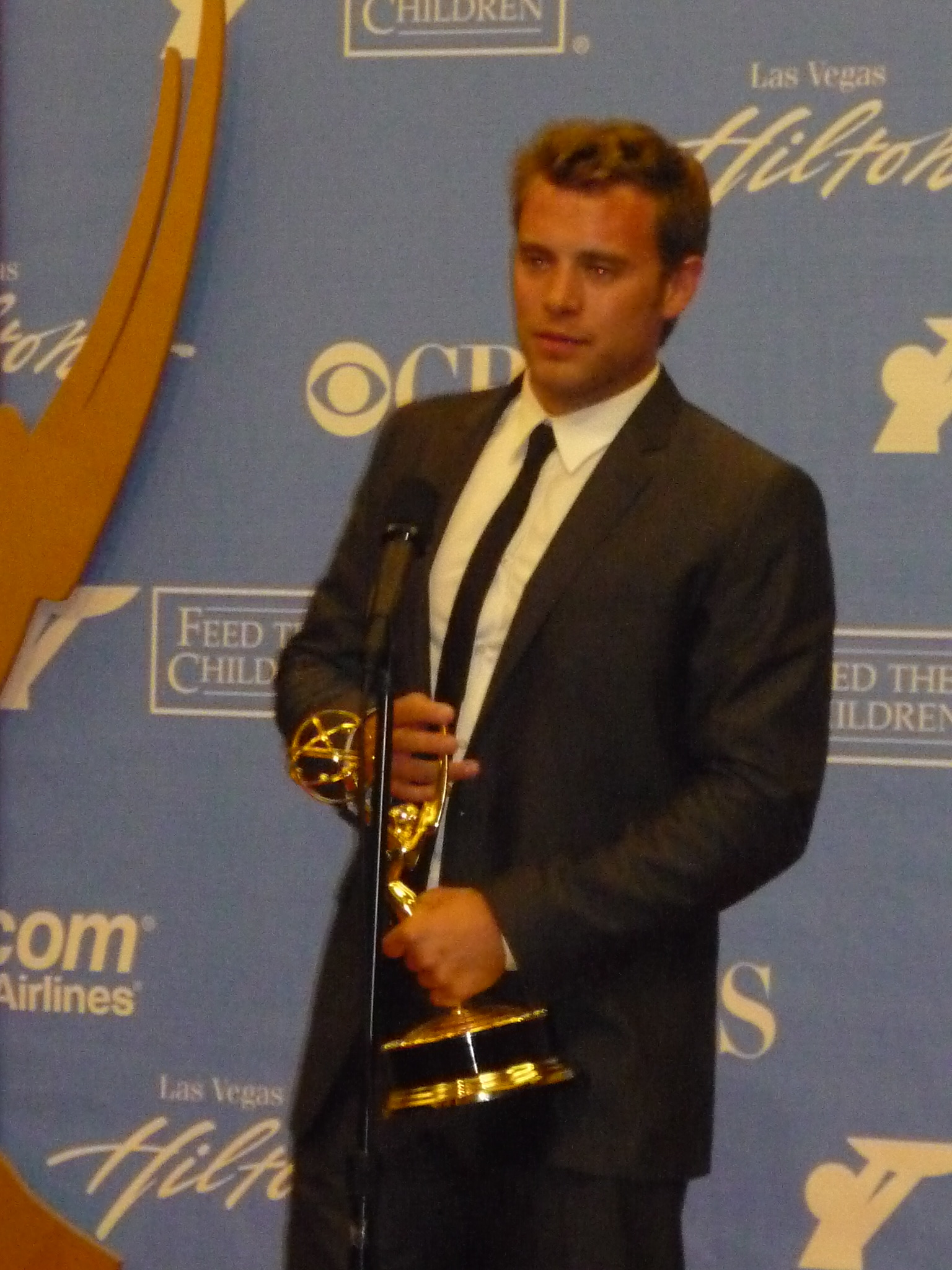
Billy Miller, Outstanding Supporting Actor in a Drama Series winner

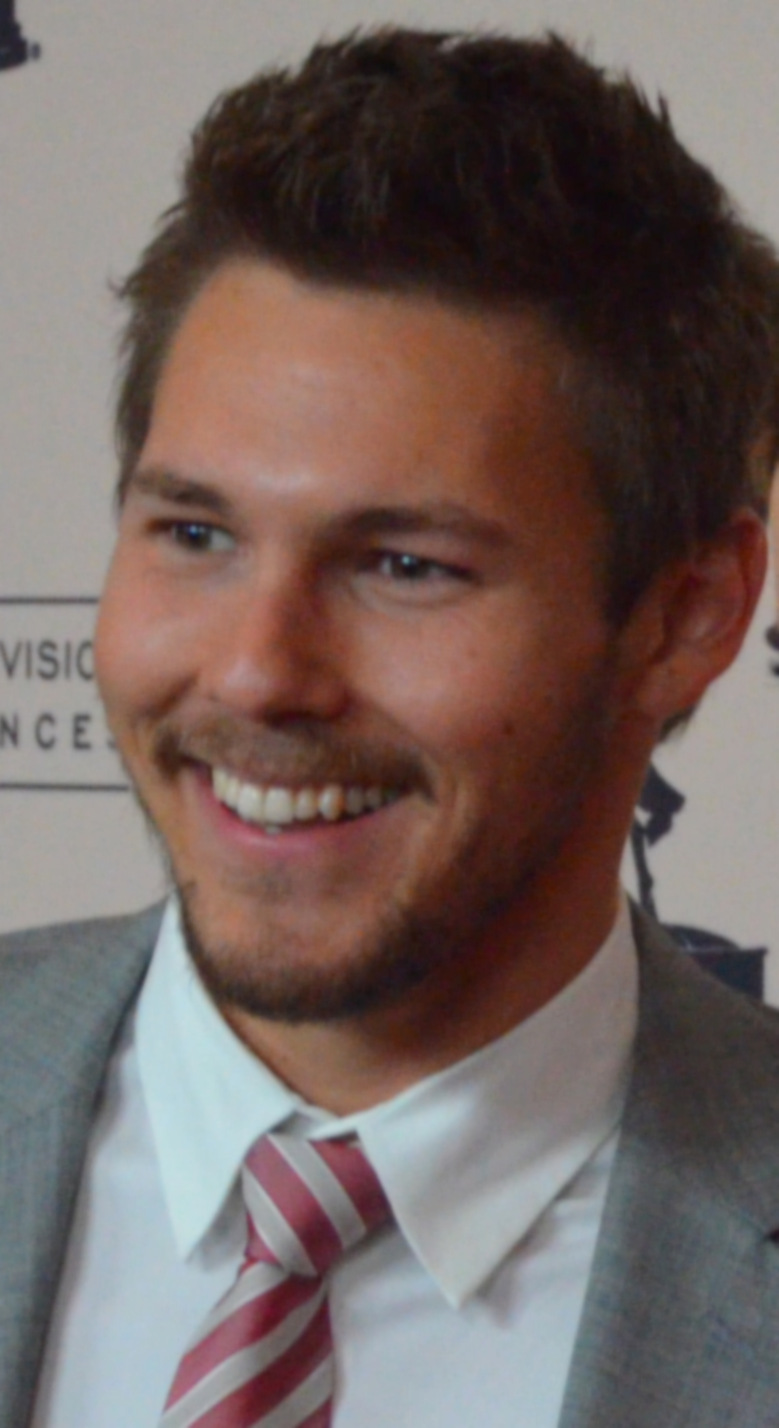
Scott Clifton, Outstanding Supporting Actor in a Drama Series winner

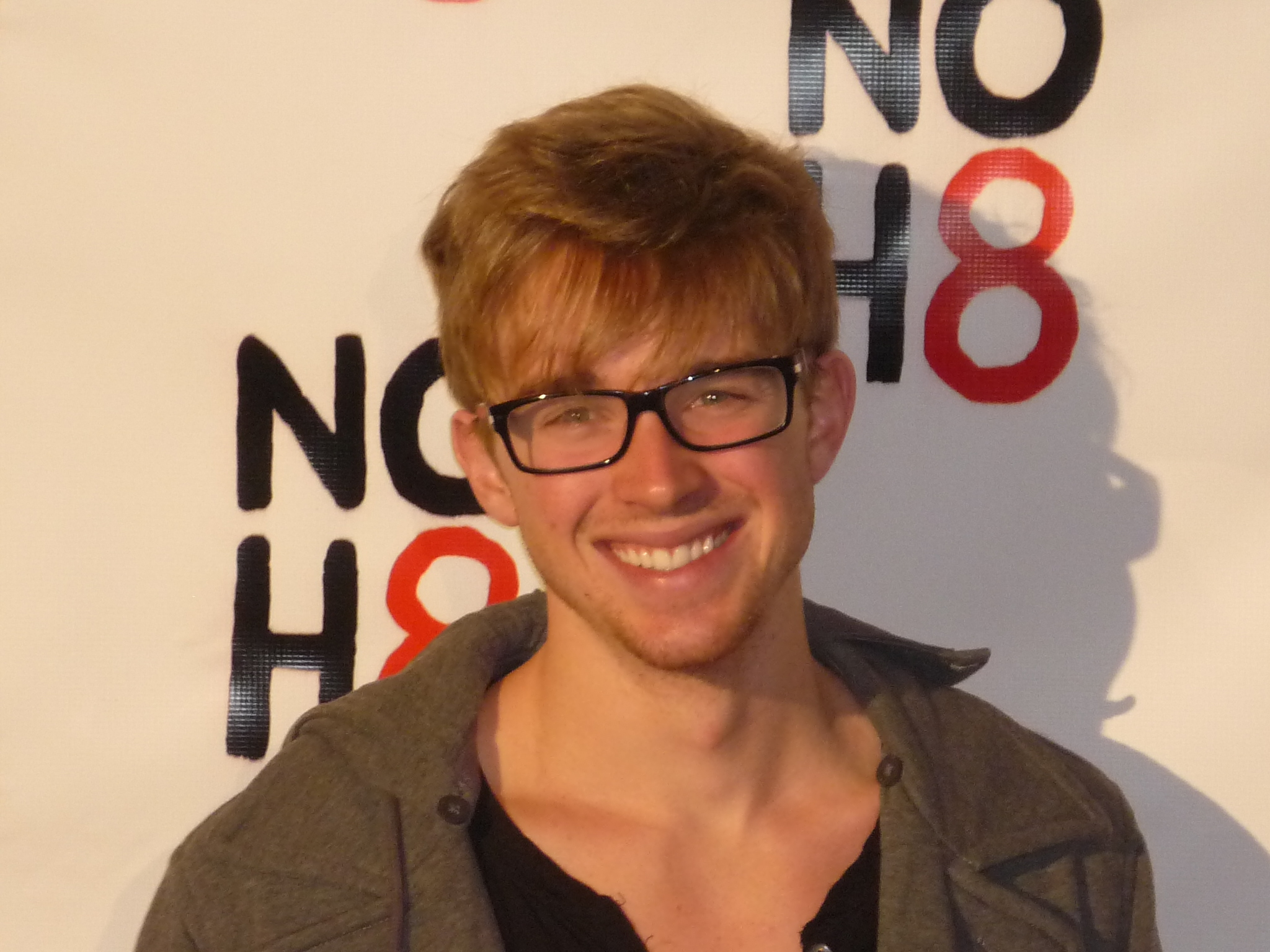
Chandler Massey, Outstanding Younger Actor in a Drama Series winner

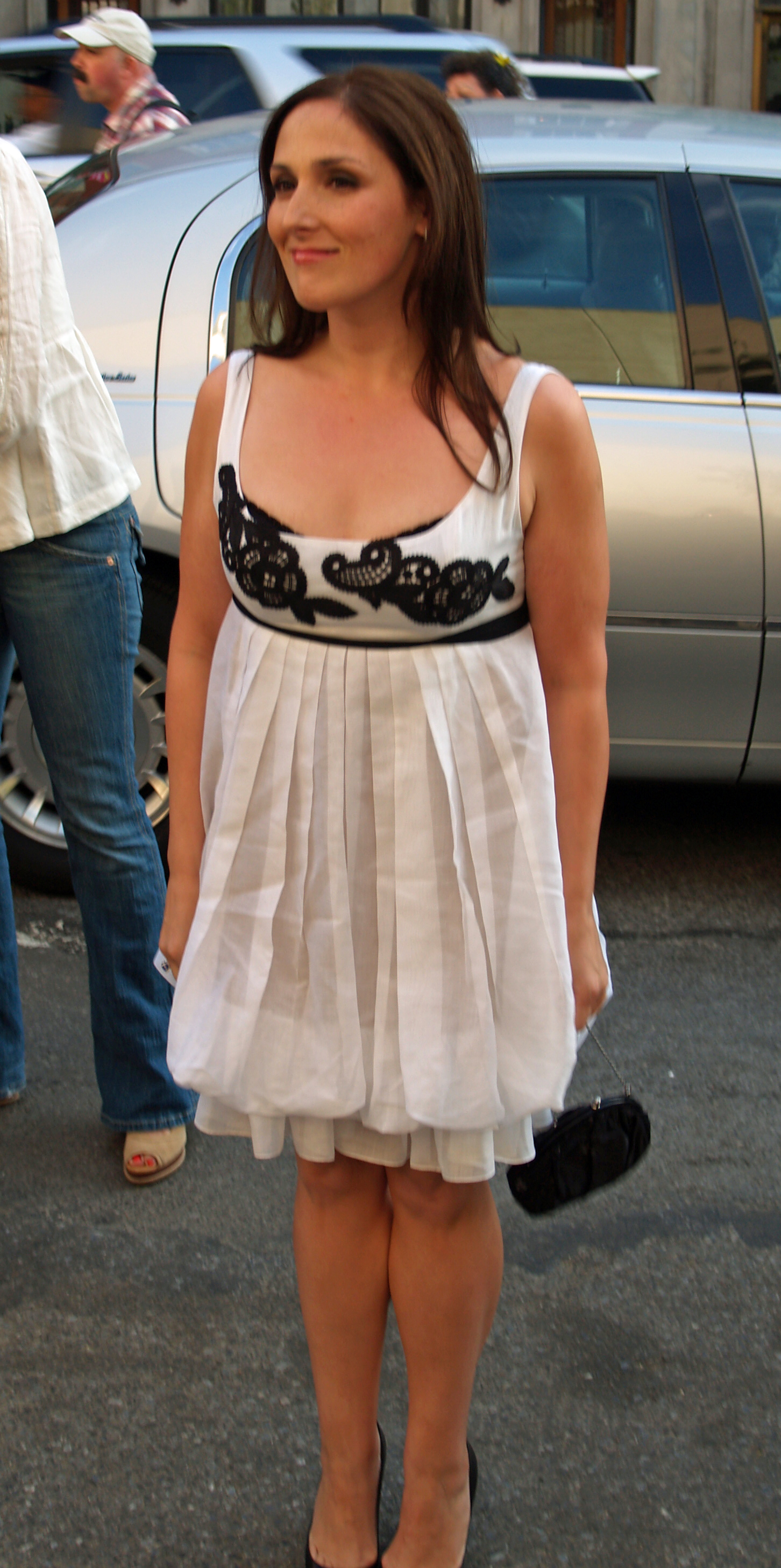
Ricki Lake, Outstanding Talk Show Host winner

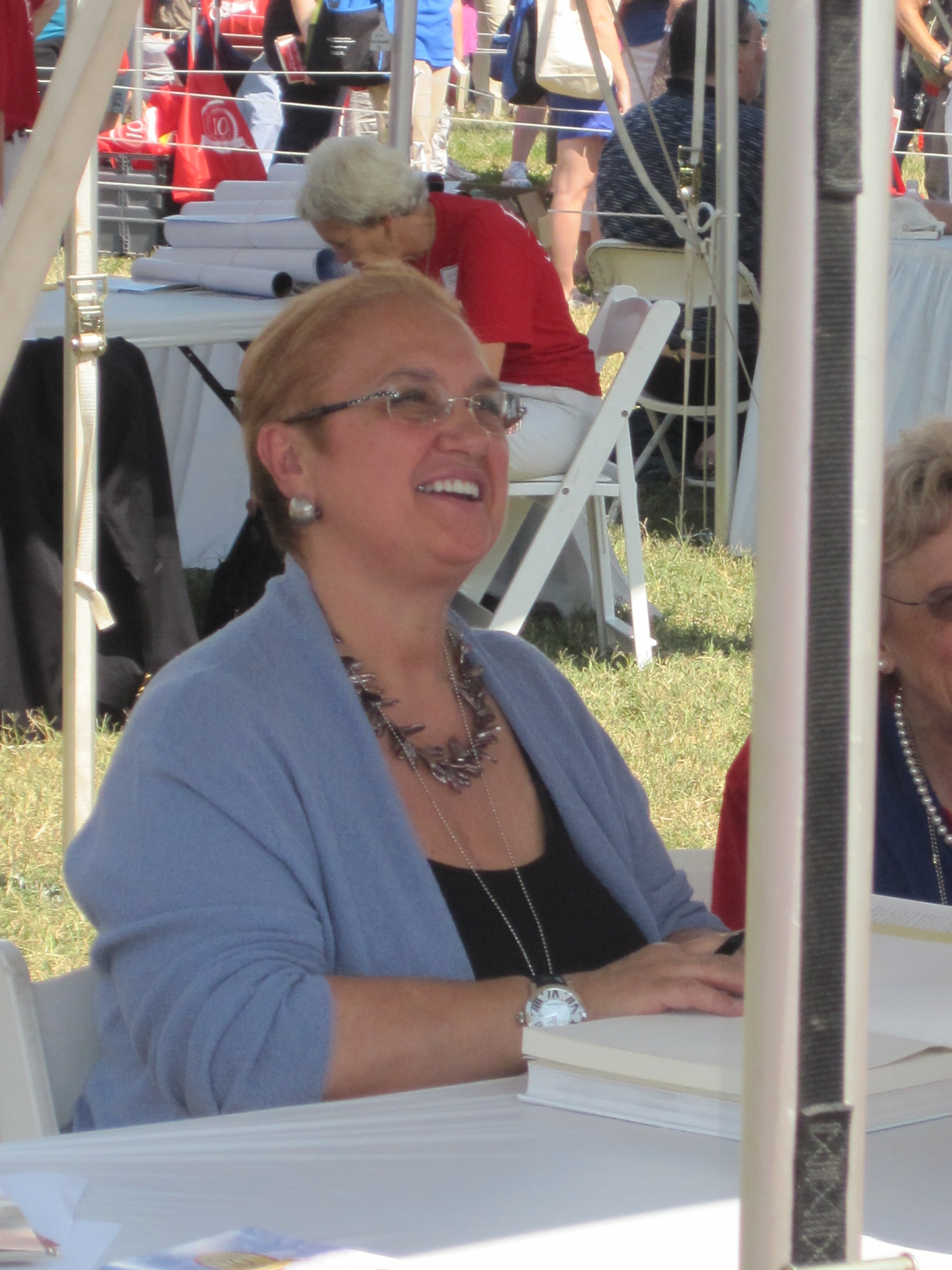
Lidia Bastianich, Outstanding Culinary Host winner

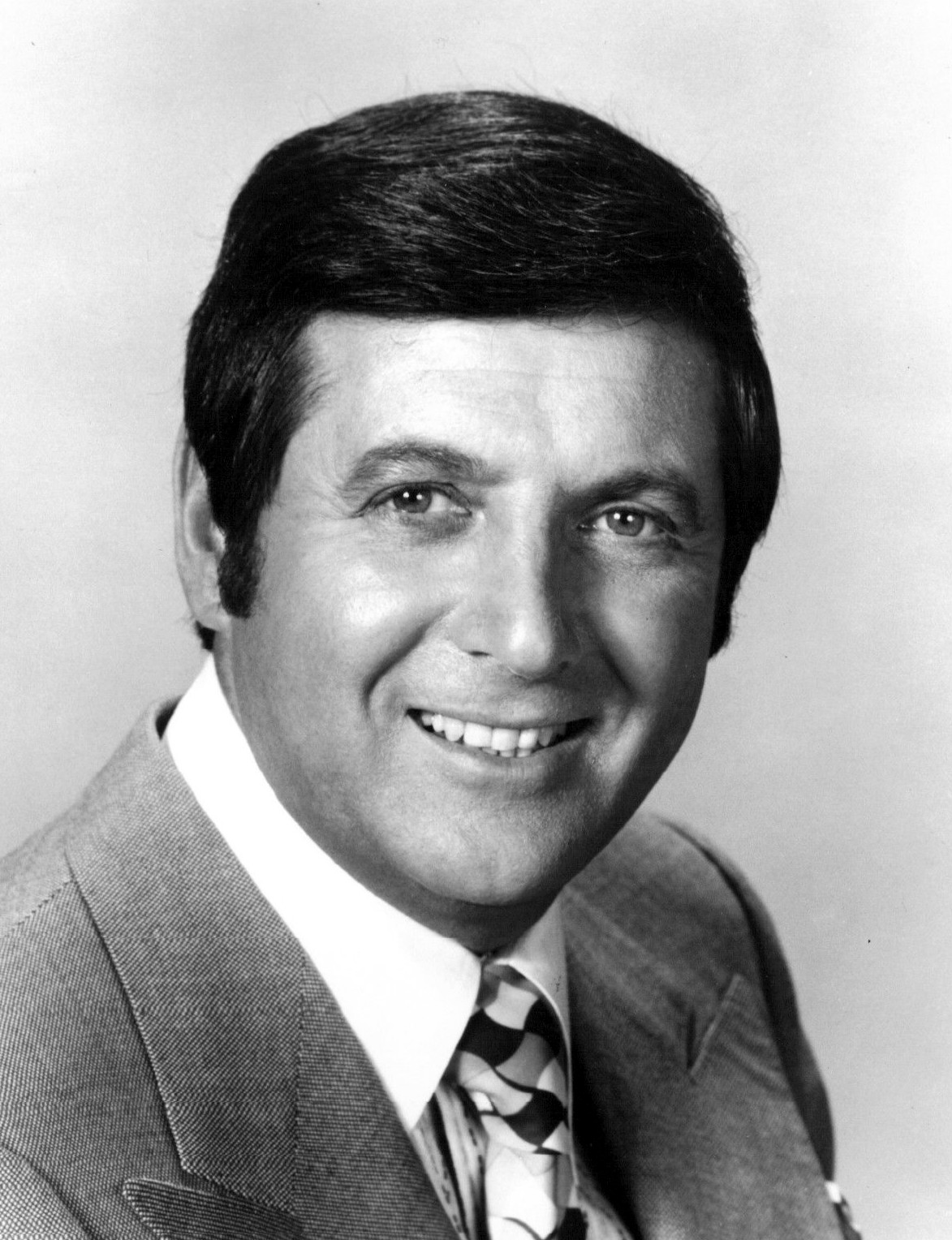
Monty Hall, Lifetime Achievement Award recipient

In the lists below, the winner of the category is shown first, with a double-dagger (‡), followed by the other nominees.

Category	Winners and nominees
Outstanding Drama Series	Days of Our Lives (NBC) ‡; The Bold and the Beautiful (CBS); General Hospital (ABC); One Life to Live (ABC); The Young and the Restless (CBS)
Outstanding Game Show	The Price Is Right ‡; Cash Cab; Family Feud; Jeopardy!; Let's Make a Deal; Who Wants to Be a Millionaire?
Outstanding Morning Program	CBS Sunday Morning ‡; Good Morning America; Today
Outstanding Special Class Animated Program	Star Wars: The Clone Wars ‡; Dan Vs.; The Legend of Korra
Outstanding Talk Show Entertainment	The Ellen DeGeneres Show ‡; Live! with Kelly and Michael; The Talk; The View
Outstanding Talk Show Informative	The Dr. Oz Show ‡; The Doctors; Katie
Outstanding Lead Actor in a Drama Series	Doug Davidson as Paul Williams on The Young and the Restless (CBS) ‡; Peter Bergman as Jack Abbott on The Young and the Restless (CBS); Michael Muhney as Adam Newman on The Young and the Restless (CBS); Jason Thompson as Patrick Drake on General Hospital (ABC)
Outstanding Lead Actress in a Drama Series	Heather Tom as Katie Logan Spencer on The Bold and the Beautiful (CBS) ‡; Susan Flannery as Stephanie Forrester on The Bold and the Beautiful (CBS); Peggy McCay as Caroline Brady on Days of Our Lives (NBC); Michelle Stafford as Phyllis Summers Newman on The Young and the Restless (CBS)
Outstanding Supporting Actor in a Drama Series	Scott Clifton as Liam Spencer on The Bold and the Beautiful (CBS) ‡; Billy Miller as Billy Abbott on The Young and the Restless (CBS)‡; Bradford Anderson as Damian Spinelli on General Hospital (ABC); Jeff Branson as Ronan Malloy on The Young and the Restless (CBS)
Outstanding Supporting Actress in a Drama Series	Julie Marie Berman as Lulu Spencer on General Hospital (ABC) ‡; Melissa Claire Egan as Chelsea Newman on The Young and the Restless (CBS); Jessica Collins as Avery Bailey Clark on The Young and the Restless (CBS); Katherine Kelly Lang as Brooke Logan on The Bold and the Beautiful (CBS); Arianne Zucker as Nicole Walker on Days of Our Lives (NBC)
Outstanding Younger Actor in a Drama Series	Chandler Massey as Will Horton on Days of Our Lives (NBC) ‡; Max Ehrich as Fenmore Baldwin on The Young and the Restless (CBS); Bryton James as Devon Hamilton on The Young and the Restless (CBS); Freddie Smith as Sonny Kiriakis on Days of Our Lives (NBC)
Outstanding Younger Actress in a Drama Series	Kristen Alderson as Starr Manning on General Hospital (ABC) ‡; Hunter King as Summer Newman on The Young and the Restless (CBS); Jacqueline MacInnes Wood as Steffy Forrester on The Bold and the Beautiful (CBS); Lindsey Morgan as Kristina Corinthos Davis on General Hospital (ABC)
Outstanding Game Show Host	Ben Bailey for Cash Cab ‡; Wayne Brady for Let's Make a Deal; Billy Eichner for Funny or Die's Billy on the Street; Steve Harvey for Family Feud; Alex Trebek for Jeopardy!
Outstanding Talk Show Host	Ricki Lake for The Ricki Lake Show ‡; Anderson Cooper for Anderson Live; Steve Harvey for Steve Harvey; Dr. Mehmet Oz for The Dr. Oz Show; Rachael Ray for Rachael Ray
Outstanding Drama Series Writing Team	The Bold and the Beautiful(CBS) ‡; General Hospital; One Life to Live; The Young and the Restless (CBS)
Outstanding Drama Series Directing Team	The Bold and the Beautiful (CBS) ‡; Days of Our Lives (NBC); General Hospital (ABC); The Young and the Restless (CBS)
Outstanding Original Song	"Good Afternoon" from Good Afternoon America (Karen Fairchild, Jimi Westbrook, Kimberly Schlapman, Phillip Sweet, Brett Warren, Brad Warren, Alan Ives) ‡; "This Day" from Katie (Sheryl Crow, Jeff Trott, Pam Wertheimer, Katie Couric, Bob Peterson)
Outstanding Culinary Host	Lidia Bastianich for Lidia's Italy ‡; Giada De Laurentiis for Giada at Home; Ina Garten for Barefoot Contessa: Back to Basics; Ching-He Huang for Easy Chinese With Ching-He Huang; Nathan Lyon for Good Food America with Nathan Lyon; Kelsey Nixon for Kelsey's Essentials

=== Lifetime Achievement Award ===
- Monty Hall
- Bob Stewart

== Presenters and performances ==
The following individuals presented awards or performed musical acts.

=== Presenters ===
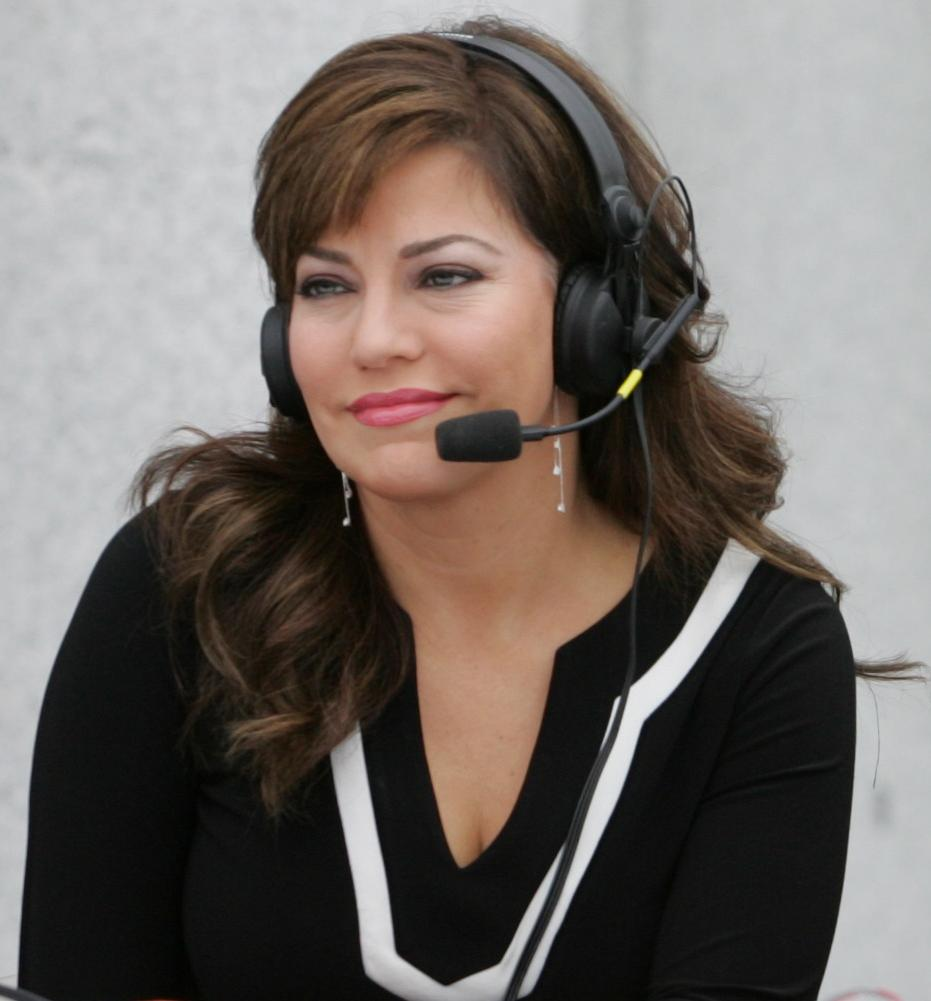
Robin Meade served as one of the hosts, presenters and performers during the ceremony

Name(s)	Role
Kristen Alderson; Hunter King; Lindsey Morgan; Jacqueline MacInnes Wood	Presenters of the award for Outstanding Lead Actress in a Drama Series
Corbin Bernsen; Jess Walton	Presenters of the In memoriam tribute and introducers of the performance of Il Volo
Wayne Brady	Presenter of the Lifetime Achievement Award to Monty Hall
Julie Chen Moonves; Sara Gilbert; Sharon Osbourne; Aisha Tyler; Sheryl Underwood	Presenters of the award for Outstanding Talk Show Informative
Don Diamont; Nancy Lee Grahn	Presenters of the award for Outstanding Supporting Actor in a Drama Series
Max Ehrich; Bryton James; Chandler Massey; Freddie Smith	Presenters of the award for Outstanding Lead Actor in a Drama Series
Carrie Fisher	Presenter of the award for Outstanding Special Class Animated Program
Bethenny Frankel	Presenter of the award for Outstanding Culinary Host & Culinary Program
Kathy Griffin	Presenter of the award for Outstanding Drama Series Writing Team
Lindsay Hartley	Presenter of the award for Outstanding Younger Actor in a Drama Series
Steve Harvey	Presenter of the award for Outstanding Morning Program
Vincent Irizarry	Presenter of the award for Outstanding Younger Actress in a Drama Series
Kris Jenner	Presenter of the award for Outstanding Talk Show Host
Robin Meade	Presenter of the award for Outstanding Original Song
Kelly Monaco; Jason Thompson	Presenters of the award for Outstanding Supporting Actress in a Drama Series
Todd Newton	Presenter of the award for Outstanding Game Show & Game Show Host
Drew Pinsky	Presenter of the award for Outstanding Talk Show Entertainment
Rachael Ray	Presenter of the award for Outstanding Drama Series Directing Team
Erika Slezak	Presenter of the award for Outstanding Drama Series
Alex Trebek	Presenter of the Smithsonian
Betty White	Presenter of the Lifetime Achievement Award to Bob Stewart

=== Performers ===
Name(s)	Performed
Robin Meade	″Good Afternoon″ from Good Afternoon America ″This Day″ from Katie
Il Volo	"Mas Que Amor" during the annual In Memoriam tribute
