= Adrianna Costa =

American television personality

- Born: Adrianna Heber; June 26, 1981 (age 44); Los Angeles, California, U.S.
- Occupation: TV personality
- Years active: 2001–present

Adrianna Costa (born Adrianna Heber; June 26, 1981) is an American television personality best known as an entertainment reporter and a reality show host.

== Biography ==
Heber, whose mother's name is Anita Garza, graduated from Agoura High School in Agoura Hills, California, in 1999. She received a Bachelor of Arts degree in broadcast journalism, with a minor in film studies, from the University of Colorado in 2003. In 2001, she appeared in the 36-minute student short Red Roses as the character "Veronica".

Heber began working as a local entertainment reporter at the Palm Springs, California CBS television network affiliate KPSP-LP, a low-power television station known as "CBS 2", though broadcast on UHF channel 38. She expanded into entertainment reporting for the cable television networks E! Entertainment Television (hosting 20 Hippest Hot Spots and doing music-news reporting) and MSNBC, as well for as the local Fox Broadcasting affiliate, KDFX-CA.

Other assignments included work for the syndicated entertainment-news program Access Hollywood and the morning show Good Day L.A.. She was also a morning co-host for on the Palm Springs radio station KPSI-FM.

As Adrianna Costa, she became an entertainment reporter for the CNN Headline News program Robin & Company, hosted by Robin Meade, in October 2005, signing a three-year contract. She left the network in May 2007 to become host of the Fox amateur-filmmaker competition, On the Lot. She was also on the TLC television show Say Yes to the Dress.
