= Coy Wire =

American football player and television anchor for CNN 10 (born 1978)

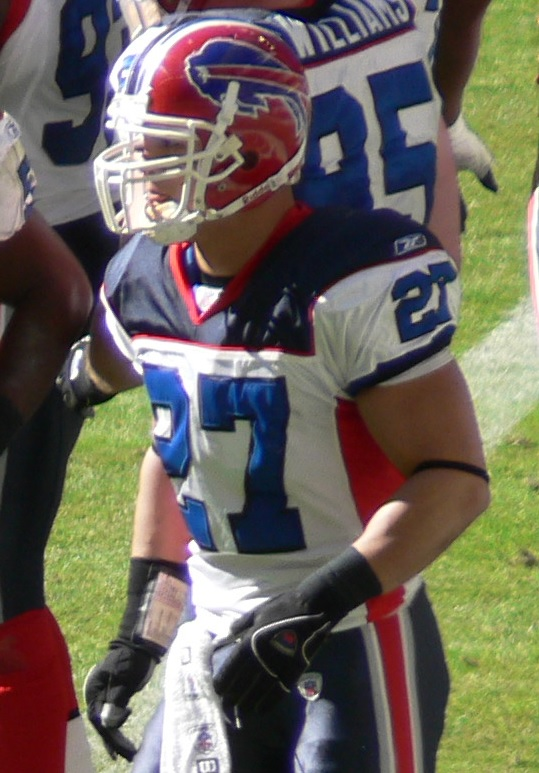
- Wire with the Buffalo Bills in 2006

No. 27, 52
- Positions: Linebacker, safety

Personal information
- Born: November 7, 1978 (age 48); Lemoyne, Pennsylvania, U.S.
- Listed height: 6 ft 0 in (1.83 m)
- Listed weight: 225 lb (102 kg)

Career information
- High school: Cedar Cliff (Camp Hill, Pennsylvania)
- College: Stanford
- NFL draft: 2002: 3rd round, 97th overall pick

Career history
- Buffalo Bills (2002–2007); Atlanta Falcons (2008–2010); CNN 10

Awards and highlights
- First-team All-Pac-10 (2001)

Career NFL statistics
- Total tackles: 253
- Sacks: 5.0
- Forced fumbles: 2
- Fumble recoveries: 5
- Pass deflections: 5
- Stats at Pro Football Reference

Coy Michael Wire (born November 7, 1978) is an American television anchor, correspondent, and a former professional football player who spent nine seasons in the National Football League (NFL). Wire played college football for Stanford and was selected by the Buffalo Bills in the third round of the 2002 NFL draft. Since 2015, he has worked for CNN as a sports anchor and correspondent, and currently is the anchor of CNN 10, a student-oriented news show.

Wire was a punt returner and wide receiver who played college football for Stanford. He played six seasons for the Buffalo Bills from 2002 to 2007 and three seasons for the Atlanta Falcons from 2008 to 2010.

With CNN, Wire's many field assignments have included on-the-ground coverage of the 2015 FIFA Women's World Cup, the College Football Playoff Semi-Finals and National Championship games, and Super Bowl 50.

== Early life ==
Wire attended Bridge Valley Elementary in the South Middleton School District. Highland Elementary School, Lemoyne Middle School, and Cedar Cliff High School, all in the West Shore School District. He graduated from Cedar Cliff in Camp Hill, Pennsylvania in 1997 where he set school records in both football and wrestling that have still not been broken. In 1995, his father, Rick, founded Dynamite Sports, a company that guides student athletes and their families through the recruiting process.

== College career ==
Wire graduated from Stanford University and was the first player in modern school history to lead the team in rushing one year and tackles in another.

== Professional career ==
Pre-draft measurables
Height	Weight	Arm length	Hand span	40-yard dash	20-yard shuttle	Three-cone drill	Vertical jump	Broad jump	Bench press
5 ft 11 3/4 in (1.82 m)	209 lb (95 kg)	30 1/4 in (0.77 m)	9 3/4 in (0.25 m)	4.56 s	3.87 s	6.62 s	38.5 in (0.98 m)	10 ft 0 in (3.05 m)	28 reps
All values from NFL Combine

=== Buffalo Bills ===
Wire was selected in the third round of the 2002 NFL draft (97th overall) by the Buffalo Bills. He started 15 games at strong safety as a rookie.

Following the signing of Lawyer Milloy in 2003, Wire became a full-time special teams player and was named Buffalo's Special Teams Player of the Year twice. Wire was voted a team captain in 2005 and selected by his teammates as the Bills' Walter Payton Man of the Year nominee. After suffering a neck injury that required surgery to insert a titanium plate and four screws into his neck, Wire was released by the Bills on February 27, 2008.

=== Atlanta Falcons ===
Wire signed with the Atlanta Falcons on July 25, 2008. He played in 47 of 48 games over three seasons with the Falcons before being released on September 2, 2011. While with the Falcons, Wire was named a team captain and selected by his teammates as the franchise recipient of the Ed Block Courage Award in 2010.

=== NFL statistics ===
NFL career statistics
Season				Tackling				Fumbles		Interceptions				
Year	Team	GP	GS	Combined	Solo	Assisted	Sacks	FF	FR	PD	Int	Yds	TD	Lng
2002	BUF	16	15	96	71	25	3.0	0	0	1	0	0	0	0
2003	BUF	16	1	28	24	4	1.0	0	0	2	0	0	0	0
2004	BUF	12	3	25	14	11	1.0	0	1	0	0	0	0	0
2005	BUF	13	0	9	6	3	0.0	1	0	0	0	0	0	0
2006	BUF	16	1	23	13	10	0.0	0	0	0	0	0	0	0
2007	BUF	7	1	4	3	1	0.0	0	0	0	0	0	0	0
2008	ATL	16	4	34	28	6	0.0	0	0	1	0	0	0	0
2009	ATL	16	1	17	15	2	0.0	1	2	1	0	0	0	0
2010	ATL	15	0	12	8	4	0.0	0	1	0	0	0	0	0
Career		127	26	248	182	66	5.0	2	4	5	0	0	0	0

== Media career ==
Wire served as a game analyst, studio analyst and online writer for Fox Sports before joining CNN in 2015. From CNN Center, Wire anchors daily Bleacher Report segments, covers events and serves as an expert contributor across all platforms. He appears regularly on CNN programs Early Start, New Day and CNN Newsroom, in addition to HLN programs Morning Express with Robin Meade and Weekend Express with Lynn Smith. He also contributes to CNN International's World Sport program and to CNN Digital on a broad range of crossover sports stories.

In 2019, Wire worked as a special assignment travel correspondent for CNN.

On September 8, 2022, Wire was made anchor of seasonal news program CNN 10, replacing former host Carl Azuz. In the aftermath of this change, many students, teachers and parents were surprised and expressed dismay at the change of anchor.

== Personal life ==
Wire was raised by his parents, Rick and Jane Wire. His mother, Jane, is a visual specialist. He has a sister, Tiffany, and a brother, Casey, who is a PGA certified teaching professional. Wire is of German, Irish, Dutch, and Japanese descent. His mother named him after the Japanese word for "love". Wire resides in Atlanta, Georgia, with his wife, Claire, who owns a home design and renovation company.

Wire wrote an inspirational book, Change Your Mind, which was published in 2011.

=== Community work ===
Wire has served on the board of directors at Make-A-Wish Georgia and has been a keynote speaker for organizations such as the U.S. Military, UPS, and the U.S. Department of Education.
