= Christi Paul =

American journalist

- Born: Bellevue, Ohio, U.S.
- Education: University of Toledo
- Occupations: News anchor; Talk show host
- Employers: WDTV; CNN (2003–2022); WKYC (2022–present)
- Spouse(s): Rob Koebel (divorced); Peter Wurm
- Children: 3

Christi Paul is an American journalist and former weekday news anchor for HLN and weekend anchor for CNN's New Day.

== Biography ==
Paul was raised in a Christian family in Bellevue, Ohio. She graduated from the University of Toledo where she earned a bachelor's degree in broadcast journalism. She first started in broadcast journalism in Clarksburg, West Virginia, working as a news anchor, editor, photographer, and reporter at WDTV. She then worked as a reporter and anchor in Boise, Idaho, and Phoenix. While at KTVB in Idaho, she was honored by the Idaho Press Club for her stories about Julianne Prudhomme, a four-year-old girl who underwent a five-organ transplant.

Paul joined CNN in the spring of 2003. During her tenure at CNN, she anchored programs on the sister station HLN, which included being a substitute host for Morning Express with Robin Meade. She was also the weekend anchor for CNN's New Day for nine years. She covered the GOP Convention in 2016 in Cleveland. On June 26, 2022, she departed from the network after signing off on New Day Weekend to move back to Ohio. A month later, Paul joined the local news station WKYC in Cleveland, where she will co-anchor What's New on weekdays and focus on special content.

== Personal life ==
Paul is married to Peter Wurm and they have three daughters. She was previously married to reporter and news anchor Rob Koebel, whom she met in West Virginia and with whom she moved to Boise and Phoenix. She authored a book titled Love Isn't Supposed to Hurt in 2012, which recounted her marriage and domestic abuse she received from Koebel (who is named "Justin" in the book).

She is a former Miss Mansfield (Ohio); Miss Greater Cleveland, 1991–92; and third runner up to Miss Ohio, 1993. She had contested for the crown to succeed the 1992 winner Robin Meade, who would be her co-worker on CNN.

She performed the national anthem before the Atlanta Braves vs. Florida Marlins game on Wednesday, June 6, 2007, and the National Hockey League game on February 24, 2009, between the Colorado Avalanche and the Atlanta Thrashers (both games taking place in Atlanta).

Paul lent her voice to the narration of Skyview Atlanta about the area surrounding the Ferris wheel built around Centennial Olympic Park that opened in 2014.
