= Sarah Hider =

American beauty pageant titleholder

- Born: June 10, 1991 (age 35)
- Education: Ohio University; Kent State University
- Beauty pageant titleholder
- Title: Miss Ohio's Outstanding Teen 2008; Miss North Coast 2009; Miss Central Ohio 2011; Miss Maple City 2015; Miss Ohio 2015
- Hair color: Blonde
- Major competition: Miss America 2016

Sarah Hider (born June 10, 1991) is from Wooster, Ohio, and was chosen as Miss Ohio's Outstanding Teen 2008 and crowned Miss Ohio 2015. She competed for the Miss America 2016 title in September 2015.

== Pageant career ==
=== Early pageants ===
As a teen, Hider competed in the 2008 Miss Ohio's Outstanding Teen pageant as Miss Lake Erie's Teen. She won the state title and went on to compete for Miss America's Outstanding Teen 2009.

As an adult, Hider won the Miss North Coast 2009 title on August 1, 2009. She competed in the 2010 Miss Ohio pageant. She was not a Top-10 semi-finalist for the state title. In October 2010, Hider won the Miss Central Ohio 2011 title. She competed in the 2011 Miss Ohio pageant. She was not a Top-10 semi-finalist for the state title.

=== Miss Ohio 2015 ===
After the 2011 pageant, Hider took several years off from competing, moving around the United States and gaining life experiences. She returned to Ohio to compete for the Miss Ohio title during her last year of eligibility. On November 1, 2014, Hider was crowned Miss Maple City 2015.

Hider entered the Miss Ohio pageant for the third time in June 2015. Hider's competition talent was a jazz vocal performance of "Almost Like Being in Love," which one her the preliminary talent award. Hider won the Miss Ohio competition on Saturday, June 20, 2015, when she received her crown from outgoing Miss Ohio titleholder Mackenzie Bart. She earned more than $10,000 in scholarship money and other prizes from the state pageant. Hider was Ohio's representative at the Miss America 2016 pageant in Atlantic City, New Jersey, in September 2015. As Miss Ohio, her activities included public appearances across the state of Ohio where she performed her vocal talent for audiences, spoke to the importance of volunteerism at civic organizations, clubs and nonprofit events and meetings, and toured schools throughout Ohio.

== Early life and education ==
Hider is a native of Wooster, Ohio, She completed her master's degree in Public Administration at Kent State University. She got her undergraduate degree in journalism from Ohio University, where she was a member of Chi Omega. She was employed at The Village Network as a Grant Writer/Public Relations Manager. She has also worked as a Development and Marketing Manager for Back on my Feet Atlanta and as a Community Relations Manager for Kendra Scott in both Atlanta, Georgia and in Columbus, Ohio. In early 2019, Hider became the Development Director for Girls on the Run of Central Ohio.

Awards and achievements
Preceded by Mackenzie Bart	Miss Ohio; 2015	Succeeded by Alice Magoto
