= Miss America 1978 =

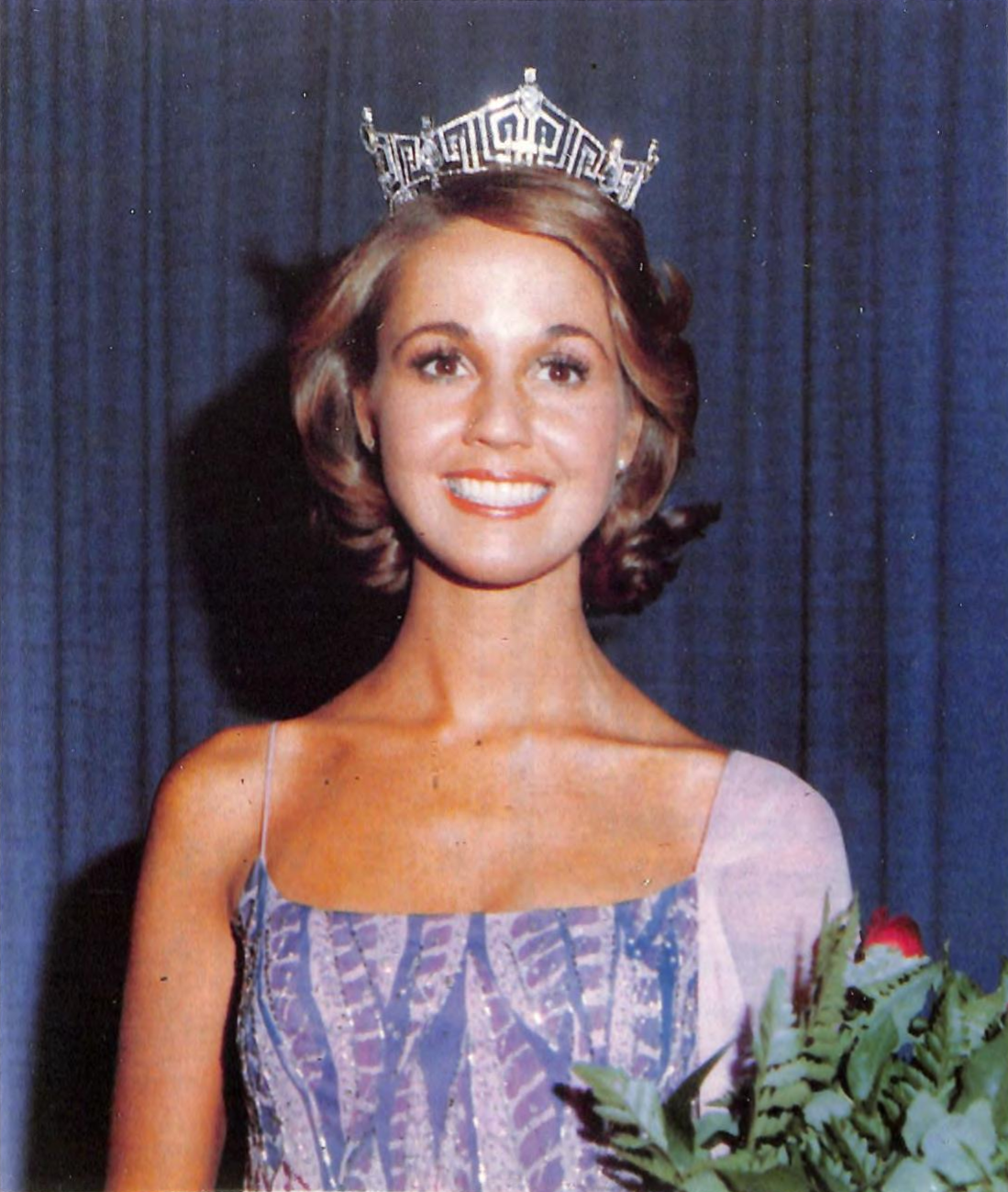
- Miss America 1978, Susan Perkins
- Date: September 10, 1977
- Presenters: Bert Parks, Phyllis George
- Venue: Boardwalk Hall, Atlantic City, New Jersey
- Broadcaster: CBS
- Winner: Susan Perkins; Ohio

Miss America 1978, the 51st Miss America pageant, was held at the Boardwalk Hall in Atlantic City, New Jersey on September 10, 1977. The pageant was televised on CBS, making this the last Miss America Pageant broadcast (as of 2022) by CBS, and the only one from 1966 through 1996 not televised by NBC. The winner was Miss Ohio, Susan Perkins.

== Results ==
=== Placements ===
Final results	Contestant
Miss America 1978	Ohio - Susan Perkins
1st runner-up	Indiana - Barbara Mougin
2nd runner-up	South Carolina - Catherine Hinson
3rd runner-up	New Jersey - Mary D'Arcy
4th runner-up	Florida - Catherine LaBelle
Top 10	California - Connie Lee Haugen; Oregon - Suzanne Louise Bunker; Pennsylvania - Lynne Carol Grote; Tennessee - Linda Faye Moore; Texas - Lori Smith
