= Miss Ohio's Teen =

Miss Ohio’s Teen
- Formation: 2005
- Type: Beauty pageant
- Location: Mansfield, Ohio
- Members: Miss America's Teen
- Official language: English
- Key people: Holly Campbell-Bradley
- Website: Official website

The Miss Ohio's Teen competition is the pageant that selects the representative for the U.S. state of Ohio in the Miss America's Teen pageant.

Cicely Esterline of Circleville was crowned Miss Ohio's Teen on June 19, 2026, at the Archer Auditorium at Ashland High School in Ashland, Ohio. She competed for the title of Miss America's Teen 2027 on September 5, 2026, at the Kravis Center for the Performing Arts in West Palm Beach, Florida.

== Results summary ==
The following is a visual summary of the past results of Miss Ohio's Outstanding Teen titleholders presented in the table below. The year in parentheses indicates year of the Miss America's Outstanding Teen competition in which the placement and/or award was garnered.

=== Placements ===
- 1st Runner Up: Paisley French (2024)
- Top 10: Cecili Weber (2011)
- Top 11: Ali Payton (2026)
- Top 15: Ali Nance (2006), Kelsey Barrett (2012)

=== Awards ===
==== Preliminary awards ====
- Preliminary Fitness: Ali Payton (2026)
- Preliminary Evening Wear/On Stage Question: Cecili Weber (2011)

== Winners ==
- Declared as Winner
- Ended as a runner-up
- Ended as a finalist or semi-finalist

Year	Name	Hometown	Age	Local title	Talent	Placement at MAO Teen	Special scholarships at MAO Teen	Notes
2026	Cicely Esterline	Circleville	17	Miss Shawnee's Teen	Lyrical Dance, “Hero”			
2025	Ali Payton	Chillicothe	17	Miss South Central's Teen	Tap Dance, “Hey Pachuco”	Top 11	Preliminary Fitness Award	
2024	Allie Gray	Celina	17	Miss Lake Festival's Teen	American Sign Language, "Don't Give Up on Me"			
2023	Paisley French	Wheelersburg	18	Miss Portmouth's Teen	Lyrical Dance, "Hallelujah"	1st Runner Up		
2022	Cassandra Kurek	Bucyrus	16	Miss Greater Cleveland's Outstanding Teen	Vocal, "Think of Me"			
2021	Madison Yuzwa	Broadview Heights	18	Miss Miami Valley's Outstanding Teen	Competitive Tumbling, "Broken Heels"			
2019-20	Madison DeFrank	New Albany	18	Miss Shawnee's Outstanding Teen	Vocal, "Rise Up"			Previously auditioned for American Idol and The Voice Older sister of Miss California's Outstanding Teen 2022, Olivia DeFrank
2018	Julianna Heichel	Lexington	15	Miss Northern Ohio's Outstanding Teen	Vocal, "Feeling Good"			Sister of Miss Ohio's Outstanding Teen 2016, Madison Heichel
2017	Gracie Fusco	Kirtland	16	Miss Great Lake's Outstanding Teen	Dance, "You Can't Stop the Beat" from Hairspray			
2016	Madison Heichel	Lexington	15	Miss Shawnee's Outstanding Teen	Vocal, "Don't Rain on My Parade"			Sister of Miss Ohio's Outstanding Teen 2018, Julianna Heichel
2015	Emily Krejci	North Royalton	15	Miss Maple City's Outstanding Teen	Vocal, "Everybody Says Don't" from Anyone Can Whistle			
2014	Rosie Westerbeck	New Bremen	15	Miss Apple Blossom's Outstanding Teen	Clogging			
2013	Olivia Thoroughman	Portsmouth	17	Miss Portsmouth's Outstanding Teen				
2012	Sarah Eash	Lakewood		Miss Cuyahoga County's Outstanding Teen	Dance			
2011	Kelsey Barrett	Wapakoneta	17	Miss Crystal Lakes' Outstanding Teen	Vocal, “Here's Where I Stand”	Top 15		
2010	Cecili Weber	Ironton	15	Miss Portsmouth's Outstanding Teen		Top 10	Preliminary Evening Wear/OSQ Award	1st runner-up at Miss Ohio Teen USA 2012 pageant 2nd runner-up at Miss Ohio Teen USA 2013 pageant Later Miss Virginia 2017; Top 10 at Miss America 2018 pageant
2009	Veronica Wende	Lima	17	Miss Greater Butler County's Outstanding Teen				Contestant at National Sweetheart 2016 pageant
2008	Sarah Hider	Wooster	17	Miss Lake Erie's Outstanding Teen	Vocal			Later Miss Ohio 2015
2007	Ashley Miller	Patriot	16	Miss Portsmouth's Outstanding Teen				
2006	Kelsey Ballew	Chillicothe	16		Vocal			
2005	Ali Nance	Warren	15		Musical Theater Dance		Top 15	
