= Ah2 Music =

Musical duo based in Los Angeles, California

Ah2 is a musical duo based in Los Angeles, California. Ah2 was founded in 2003 by American born composers Jeff Lippencott and Mark T. Williams to provide music themes and underscores for television and film.

Their initial network television project as Ah2 came from executive producer Mark Burnett. Starring Donald Trump, The Apprentice (2004) was an instant ratings success. Future collaboration with Steven Spielberg and Mark Burnett for the series On the Lot produced their first Emmy nomination in (2007) for Outstanding Original Main Title Theme Music.

Other shows for which Ah2 has composed music for include The Biggest Loser (2004), Beauty and the Geek (2004), Rock Star INXS/Supernova (2004–2005), The Contender (2005–2008), High School Musical: Get in the Picture (2008), American Gladiators (2008), Kid Nation (2008), and The Martha Stewart Show (2005–2012). Additionally, Ah2 has composed and licensed music for thousands of hours of television throughout the world.

Ah2 has won multiple ASCAP and BMI Film and Television awards. In addition, Ah2 has had two Primetime Emmy Nominations for Outstanding Original Main Title Theme Music in 2007 for the FOX series On the Lot and in 2008 for the CBS series Kid Nation.
