= Morning Express with Robin Meade =

- Morning Express with Robin Meade logo
- Presented by: Robin Meade; Bob Van Dillen; Jennifer Westhoven; Melissa Knowles; Coy Wire; Andy Scholes
- Country of origin: United States

Production
- Production locations: Atlanta, Georgia
- Running time: 300 minutes (five hours)

Original release
- Network: HLN (2005–2022); SiriusXM 117
- Release: 2005 – December 5, 2022

Related
- Robin & Company

Morning Express with Robin Meade is an American morning news program that aired on the HLN television network in the United States from 2005 to December 5, 2022.

== About the show ==
Morning Express with Robin Meade aired weekdays on HLN from 6:00 am to 11:00 am ET. The show broadcast live from the CNN Center in Atlanta, with a focus on news headlines pertaining to crime, politics, weather, entertainment, health, sports, and the economy.

Morning Express featured anchor Robin Meade, meteorologist Bob Van Dillen, money correspondent Jennifer Westhoven, entertainment correspondent Melissa Knowles, and sports anchor Coy Wire. The group was once described by Stephen King as "his morning people" in his Entertainment Weekly column.

Between October 2008 and April 2009, the show was accompanied by the "Morning Express Challenge" trivia game. The game ran from 8 to 10 a.m. Eastern and offered trivia on current events, polls, predictions and a chat room. Meade and the other correspondents often took part in the chat room and mentioned game players on the air. Trivia game players were eligible to win prizes that included trips, T-shirts, bathrobes, and a variety of others.

On December 1, 2022, it was reported that Morning Express had been cancelled in the wake of cost-cutting measures following the Warner Bros. Discovery merger. Beginning December 6, HLN would simulcast CNN This Morning with its sister network.

== Weekend Express ==
A weekend edition of the show titled Weekend Express first aired in 2014. This version, last anchored by Susan Hendricks, followed the similar fast-paced headline format of Morning Express and aired on weekends from 7:00 am to 12:00 pm ET on HLN. Previously, Weekend Express has been anchored by Lynn Smith and Natasha Curry.

The show's former logo

== Robin and Company era ==
From 1982 to 2005, HLN (then known as CNN Headline News) did not have a predominant morning program, but the network decided in 2005 to build a program around Robin Meade based on her growing ratings and popularity among viewers. The program was originally called Robin & Company.

Effective November 5, 2007, the program was renamed Morning Express with Robin Meade. The renamed program billed itself as the "fastest morning news show on television".

== Notable personalities ==
=== Current ===
- Robin Meade – main anchor (2005–2022)
- Bob Van Dillen – meteorologist (2005–2022)
- Jennifer Westhoven – business & finance correspondent and weekend fill-in anchor (2006–2022)
- Melissa Knowles – entertainment correspondent and weekend fill-in anchor (2015–2022)
- Andy Scholes – sports anchor (2013–2022)
- Coy Wire – sports anchor (2015–2022)
- Shyann Malone – weekday anchor and weekend fill-in anchor (2018–2022)
- Elizabeth Prann – weekday and weekend fill-in anchor (2018–2022)
- Kristina Fitzpatrick – correspondent (2015–2022)
- Natisha Lance – investigative correspondent and weekend fill-in anchor (2021–2022)
- Susan Hendricks – Weekend Express anchor and fill-in weekday anchor (2005–2022)
- Allison Chinchar – Weekend Express meteorologist (2015–2022)

=== Past ===
- Kendis Gibson – entertainment anchor (2005–2006)
- Will Selva – sports anchor (2005–2007)
- Shanon Cook – entertainment anchor (2005)
- Adrianna Costa – entertainment anchor (2005–2007)
- Richard Lui – politics and news correspondent (2007–2010)
- Rafer Weigel – sports anchor (2008–2011)
- Natasha Curry Weekend Express anchor (2010–2014)
- Hines Ward – sports anchor (2016–2019)
- Christi Paul – fill-in anchor (2005–2021)
- Mike Galanos – anchor (2005–2021)
- Lynn Smith – anchor (2014–2021)
