= Heather Wells =

American pageant titleholder (born 1989)

- Born: Heather Nicole Wells; October 29, 1989 (age 36); Warren, Ohio
- Education: Kent State University
- Beauty pageant titleholder
- Title: Miss Montgomery County 2013; Miss Ohio 2013
- Hair color: Brunette
- Eye color: Green
- Major competition: Miss America 2014

Heather Nicole Wells (born October 29, 1989) is an American beauty pageant titleholder from Warren, Ohio who was named Miss Ohio 2013.

== Biography ==
She won the title of Miss Ohio on June 22, 2013, when she received her crown from outgoing titleholder Elissa McCracken. Wells’ platform is “Divorce Recovery for Youth” and she said she hoped to use her own experience as the child of divorced parents to set up recovery programs for youths dealing with their parent's divorce during her year as Miss Ohio. Her competition talent was a lyrical dance to CeCe Winans' “Alabaster Box.” Wells is a graduate of Kent State University, with a degree in broadcast journalism.

Awards and achievements
Preceded by Elissa McCracken	Miss Ohio; 2013	Succeeded by Mackenzie Bart
