= Ellen Bryan =

American journalist (born 1988/89)

- Born: 1988 or 1989 (age 37–38); Celina, Ohio, United States
- Education: Ball State University
- Spouse: Reese Waters
- Children: 2
- Beauty pageant titleholder
- Title: Miss Lake Festival 2008; Miss Miami Valley 2010; Miss Clayland 2011; Miss Ohio 2011
- Major competition: Miss America 2012

Ellen Bryan is an American television personality and beauty pageant titleholder from Celina, Ohio. She was crowned Miss Ohio 2011 and competed for the Miss America 2012 title. She worked as a reporter for KXAS-TV in the Dallas–Fort Worth metroplex. In March 2016, she left KXAS-TV and moved to Washington, D.C., where she began working for WUSA 9.

== Pageant career ==
Bryan began competing in pageants while a sophomore at Ball State University on the advice of one of her professors. In July 2008, Bryan won the Miss Lake Festival title then, in June 2009, competed in the 2009 Miss Ohio pageant. She was named fourth runner-up to winner Erica Gelhaus. In 2010, Bryan won the Miss Miami Valley title then, in June 2010, competed in the 2010 Miss Ohio pageant. She was named third runner-up to winner Becky Minger.

In October 2010, Bryan was crowned Miss Clayland 2011 which made her eligible to compete at the 2011 Miss Ohio pageant. Entering the state pageant in June 2011 as one of 26 finalists, Bryan's preliminary competition talent for Miss Ohio was singing "Circle of Life" from the Disney film The Lion King. Her platform was promoting lightning awareness: “When Thunder Roars, Go Indoors”. Bryan took up lightning awareness as a cause after lightning struck and seriously injured her older sister, Christina, on a golf course.

Bryan won the competition on Saturday, June 18, 2011, when she received her crown from outgoing Miss Ohio titleholder Becky Minger. She earned more than $10,000 in scholarship money from the state pageant and more than $25,000 over her pageant career. As Miss Ohio, her activities included public appearances across the state of Ohio. On June 28, 2011, Bryan was honored by the 129th Ohio General Assembly with Senate Resolution 106 which, in part, resolved to "applaud Ellen Bryan on being named Miss Ohio 2011 and salute her as a fine Ohioan".

Bryan was Ohio's representative at the Miss America 2012 pageant in Las Vegas, Nevada, in January 2012. Bryan's preliminary competition talent for Miss Ohio was singing "On My Way" from the musical Violet. She was named a Quality of Life Award Finalist but was not among the top 15 semi-finalists for the national title. Her reign as Miss Ohio continued until Elissa McCracken was crowned on June 23, 2012.

== Broadcast career ==
Bryan began her broadcasting career in 2008 as a news writer and on-air personality at WCSM/WCSM-FM in Celina, Ohio. In 2010, she joined WLIO-TV in Lima, Ohio, as an intern then reporter and editor. In June 2012, after her reign as Miss Ohio, she joined WTVQ-TV in Lexington, Kentucky, as a news anchor and reporter. In May 2014, Bryan began working at KXAS-TV in Dallas–Fort Worth as a reporter. In March 2016, she relocated to Washington, D.C., and began working as a reporter for WUSA 9. In August 2025 she left WUSA (TV).

== Personal life and education ==
Bryan is a native of Celina, Ohio, and graduated from Celina High School in 2007. Her parents are Kent and Virginia Bryan. She graduated cum laude from Ball State University in 2011 with a bachelor's degree in telecommunications.

She has been married to comedian and fellow WUSA broadcaster Reese Waters since September 27, 2020. On August 29, 2021, she gave birth to their daughter. On 11 August 2023 their second child, son Kai was born. In July she announced her third pregnancy.

Awards and achievements
Preceded by Becky Minger	Miss Ohio; 2011	Succeeded by Elissa McCracken
