= Reese Waters =

American comedian and writer

- Born: October 22, 1980 (age 46); Prince George's County, Maryland, U.S.
- Education: Columbia University
- Spouse: Ellen Bryan (m. 2020)

Comedy career
- Years active: 2008–present
- Medium: Stand-up comedy, sports, writing
- Genres: Sports, Comedy
- Website: reesewaters.com

Reese Waters (born October 22, 1980) is an American comedian, commentator and writer. He was the host of Get Up DC! on WUSA, the CBS affiliate in Washington, District of Columbia.

== Early life and education ==
Waters was born in Prince George's County, Maryland, United States. He graduated from St. Albans School and has a B.A. degree in economics from Columbia University. While in college, Waters began performing comedy in New York City at local open mics. After graduating from Columbia University, Waters moved to San Francisco to pursue different styles of comedy. After two years living and performing in the Bay Area, he returned to the east coast where he is currently based. He has been married to fellow WUSA broadcaster Ellen Bryan since September 27, 2020.

== Career ==
Waters' first awards include winning the annual Caroline's Comedy Competition, and the "Emerging Comics Contest" at the New York Underground Comedy Festival. Soon afterwards, he made appearances on MTV, ABC's Good Morning America, CBS's The Early Show, Sirius Satellite Radio, Comics Unleashed and NPR, followed by a set on Comedy Central's Live At Gotham and a subsequent role on the critically acclaimed series, Michael and Michael Have Issues.

In 2009, New York Magazine listed Waters as one of "Ten New Comedians That Funny People Find Funny".

In 2010, Waters became co-host of The Daily Line on the Versus Network. Waters' list of celebrity and sports interviews include Dwyane Wade, Common and Queen Latifah to NBA MVP Derrick Rose and UFC President Dana White. Waters also wrote articles on sports and comedy in a section of ESPN.com titled Reese's Piece. Perhaps his best known interview was heavyweight champion Mike Tyson over tea, where Waters learned of Tyson's love of pigeons and hatred for the Italian pastry, cannoli.

In 2011, Waters accomplished a scheduling feature of making back-to-back appearances on The Late Late Show with Craig Ferguson and Late Show with David Letterman.

In 2014, Waters joined The Weather Channel's AMHQ: America's Morning Headquarters, as a weather and sports correspondent. He worked alongside Sam Champion.

In January 2015, ESPN named Waters a SportsCenter correspondent. He joined the network's team in Bristol, Connecticut, working alongside Will Reeve and Sarina Morales. Waters was a guest speaker at The Friars Club Super Bowl Roast where he poked fun at Terry Bradshaw.

In January 2018, Reese Waters returned to his Washington, D.C. roots and joined WUSA9 as the host of Get Up DC!. One year later, he left Get Up DC! and transferred to WUSA9's 7:00 p.m. program The Q&A, where he will replace Bruce Johnson.

Reese currently hosts a YouTube channel.

== Influences ==
Waters' list of influencers include his grandmother, Dave Chappelle, Larry David, and Garry Shandling.
