= On the Lot =

American television series

- Created by: Mark Burnett; Steven Spielberg
- Directed by: Michael A. Simon
- Presented by: Chelsea Handler (audition episodes); Adrianna Costa
- Judges: Carrie Fisher; Garry Marshall
- Composers: Jeff Lippencott and Mark T. Williams, Ah2 Music
- Country of origin: United States
- Original language: English
- No. of seasons: 1
- No. of episodes: 16

Production
- Executive producers: Steven Spielberg; Mark Burnett; David Goffin
- Running time: 60 minutes
- Production companies: DreamWorks Television; Amblin Television; Mark Burnett Productions

Original release
- Network: Fox
- Release: May 22 – August 21, 2007

On the Lot is a single season reality show and online competition for filmmaking, produced by Steven Spielberg, Mark Burnett and David Goffin. The show, which aired on Fox, featured filmmakers competing in weekly elimination competitions, with the ultimate prize of a million-dollar development deal at DreamWorks. On the Lot premiered May 22, 2007, and aired Tuesdays. The On the Lot online Movie Video Making Challenge competition aired online simultaneously alongside the TV show. In the online competition which mirrored the show, competitors from around the globe created and submitted their short films that aired online and were voted on by judges and the national popular vote.

The show was initially hosted by Chelsea Handler but she quit early on; she later said, "I quit because I smelled the disaster happening before it did." She was replaced by Adrianna Costa.

Initial episodes narrowed 50 semi-finalists down to 18 finalists. After the audition stage, the program was a one-hour show, in which movies were screened: Film Premiere. The next day featured half-hour episodes of viewer reaction, entitled Box Office. Viewers could vote each week for their favorite directors, which resulted in the elimination of the directors with the lowest vote totals. Votes could be made online at thelot.com, in addition to landline calls and Verizon text messages, and were permitted for two hours after the show.

Originally scheduled for separate episodes on consecutive nights, the "Film Premiere" episodes eventually aired on Tuesday nights at 8:00PM/7:00PM CT, with voting results as part of the following week's episode, as of May 31, 2007. The show also aired in Canada (on CTV), on People+Arts in Latin America, Portugal and Spain, on FOX8 in Australia, on STAR Movies in Asia, and on Star World in Pakistan, India and Israel. The show also aired on SABC 2 in South Africa from July 19 until early August, when it was removed from the schedule. From the 11 December 2008 SABC 2 begun broadcasting On the Lot once again.

== Contestants ==
=== Semi-finalists ===
The show was self-described as a worldwide search to discover new filmmaking talent. The official On The Lot site gathered 12,000 submissions from all over the world and the submission deadline was February 16, 2007. These 12,000 submissions yielded 50 semi-finalists. Of them, 48 resided in the United States (21 of them in Los Angeles, CA) and 40 already worked professionally in the film industry. The oldest contestant was 41 years old and the youngest was 21.

=== Finalists ===
The eighteen TV show finalists, selected after the initial audition rounds, were:

- Will Bigham, 31, film editor, originally from Canyon, Texas, living in Glendale, California; graduated from Texas Tech and attended the FSU Film School. Bigham won in 2007
- Jessica Brillhart, 22, computer specialist, grew up in York, Pennsylvania, living in Brooklyn, New York; attended NYU Film School
- Jason Epperson, 30, owner of film production company, born and raised in Winchester, Kentucky
- Sam Friedlander, 27, web producer, raised in Westchester, New York, living in Santa Monica, California
- Hilary Graham, 37, raised in Chelmsford, Massachusetts, stay-at-home wife and mom living in Francestown, New Hampshire
- Phil Hawkins, 22, born and raised in Manchester, England, works as a freelance director
- Andrew Hunt, 31, promo producer raised in Pittsburgh, Pennsylvania, living in Minneapolis, Minnesota
- Trever James, 24, film editor, raised in Great Falls, Montana, living in Los Angeles, California
- Shalini Kantayya, 30, freelance director, raised in Hartford, Connecticut, living in Brooklyn, New York
- Mateen Kemet, 41, teacher, raised in the Bronx, NY, splitting time between Oakland, California and Los Angeles, California; attended film school at Chapman University
- Claudia La Bianca, 28, painter and graphic artist, born in Bagheria, Sicily, Italy, lives in Miami, Florida
- Zach Lipovsky, 23, special effects editor from Vancouver, BC, Canada
- Marty Martin, 26 creative director of a multimedia company, born and raised in Seattle, Washington
- David May, 23, admissions counselor living in Santa Ana, California, but grew up in Aurora, Colorado; attended film school at Chapman University
- Shira-Lee Shalit, 38, acting teacher, born in Johannesburg, South Africa; living in New York
- Adam Stein, 29, freelance film editor, born in Miami, Florida, living in Los Angeles
- Carolina Zorilla de San Martin, 36, commercial director, originally from Santander, Cantabria, Spain, living in Los Angeles
- Kenny Luby, 28, freelance director and painter, living in Owego, New York

The online competition had nine finalist rounds from which the winner was chosen by judges and popular vote. The online competition winner after all the rounds was Justin Gullett

- Justin Gullett, 26, film director, originally from Memphis, Tennessee, living in Los Angeles, California; graduated from University of Memphis in Film, Video, and Photography. Gullett won the On the Lot online Movie Making Challenge in 2007.

=== Elimination chart ===
The following contestants were chosen as finalists. Placements are listed in elimination order, and alphabetically by last name until eliminated. Boxes are colored to indicate weekly groupings:

Dates of elimination
Final 18	May 29		
Final 15	June 12	June 19	June 26
Final 12	July 3		July 9
Final 10	July 17		July 24
Final 6	July 31		
Final 5	August 7		
Final 4	August 14		
Final 3	August 21		

		Final 18	Final 15	Final 12	Final 10	Final 6	Final 5	Final 4	Final 3
Place	Contestant	Result							
1	Will Bigham	Top 3							Winner
2	Jason Epperson	Top 3							Runner-up
3	Adam Stein								Elim
4	Sam Friedlander							Elim	
5	Zach Lipovsky	Top 3					Elim		
6	Andrew Hunt					Elim			
7–10	Mateen Kemet				Elim				
7–10	Kenny Luby				Elim				
7–10	Hilary Graham				Elim				
7–10	Shalini Kantayya				Elim				
11–12	Shira-Lee Shalit			Elim					
11–12	David May			Elim					
13–15	Jessica Brillhart		Elim						
13–15	Marty Martin		Elim						
13–15	Trever James		Elim						
16–18	Phil Hawkins	Elim							
16–18	Claudia La Bianca	Elim							
16–18	Carolina Zorilla de San Martin	Elim							

== Contest summary ==
=== Audition rounds ===
The judges for the audition rounds were Carrie Fisher, Brett Ratner, and Garry Marshall.

In round one, the 50 semi-finalists were each given one of five loglines, and had approximately twelve hours to expand the idea into a full story. After the twelve hours, they would pitch their ideas to the judges. After all of the pitches were delivered, 14 contestants were eliminated.

In round two of the auditions, Jon Avnet filled in for judge Garry Marshall. The remaining contestants were given 24 hours to write, shoot, and edit a two-and-a-half-minute short film based on the theme "out of time". The contestants worked in teams of three, and each of the team members was responsible for directing one of the three scenes of the film at one of the three filming locations. Each contestant was judged individually based on his or her movie scene. After this round, 12 contestants were eliminated. In round three, each of the 24 remaining contestants was given one hour with a professional set and film crew to shoot a given page of script. Almost none of this final challenge was aired on the televised episode, but short selections of the task and judgment footage were included in several outtake clips on the show's official site. After the announcement of the show's winner, all of these clips were posted on the website. The one-page shorts were categorized into four different scenarios: the rotunda, the law library, the cop bar and the bedroom. The judges would then have to choose 18 competitors to continue on to the live shows.

=== Final rounds ===
==== Week 1 ====
The first challenge for the 18 finalists was to create one-minute comedy shorts. The Film Premiere episode aired each contestant's full short, as well as a short interview/bio shot during the filming of the short. In the Box Office episode, the host announced the 15 directors who would continue on to the next round. The three directors with the highest vote totals had their films played a second time, and the three with the lowest vote totals were eliminated. The judges for week 1 of the finals were Garry Marshall, Carrie Fisher, and D. J. Caruso.

==== Weeks 2–4 ====
On the Lot was reduced to one episode per week beginning June 5, only appearing on Tuesdays. This move has been said to "cut production costs."

For weeks 2–4, five of the remaining 15 contestants were selected to screen a short no longer than three minutes, filmed in five days; however, it has been disputed whether or not this is in fact true, as these films were the "personal submission films" from the auditions (which were passed off as new films without comment). The contestant of the five with the least audience votes was eliminated. The results were shown on the next week's episode, while the next set of five films were screened.

In week three, three of the five contestants from who showed films in week two were declared safe. Trever James and Hilary Graham had to wait until the end of the show to see who would be eliminated. In week four, the five contestants who showed films in week three were told, at the start of the show, who had been eliminated.

Joining regular judges Carrie Fisher and Garry Marshall, were Michael Bay for week two, David Frankel for week three, and Wes Craven for week four.

==== Weeks 5–6 ====
In weeks five and six, the contestants were split into two groups of six. The first group was tasked with making two-minute comedy shorts in five days, while the second group's shorts were of the horror genre.

In contrast to the previous screenings, clips from the production of these films were aired showing fellow contestants visiting each set, thus ensuring that the films were in fact produced during the show period.

Mark Waters was the guest judge for week five, and Eli Roth was the guest judge for week six.

==== Weeks 7–8 ====
In weeks seven and eight, the contestants remained in the same groups as the previous weeks. The first group of five was tasked with making shorts based on the theme, "when two worlds collide". The second group's shorts were action films. Two contestants would be eliminated each of these two weeks.

Luke Greenfield was the guest judge for week seven and Antoine Fuqua was the guest judge for week eight.

==== Week 9 ====
In week nine, the final six contestants were tasked with making romantic comedies. Brad Silberling was the guest judge for week nine.

==== Week 10 ====
In week ten, the final five contestants were tasked with making films featuring automobiles for "Road Night." Gary Ross was the guest judge. Penny Marshall filled in for regular judge Garry Marshall.

The contestant who had received the most votes in the previous round would get to work with actor Jerry O'Connell on their film for this round.

==== Week 11 ====
In week eleven, four remaining contestants were tasked with making films inspired by the contest-winning logline: "A man wakes up, rolls out of bed and finds himself in a dress...but can't remember what happened the night before." This week's guest judge was F. Gary Gray.

==== Season finale ====
In the first half of the season finale, the three remaining contestants were each asked to choose two of their films to show (after the show had announced the week before that there would be new finale films). Jason Epperson showed Eternal Waters and Sweet. Will Bigham showed Glass Eye and The Yes Men. Adam Stein showed Dough: The Musical and Army Guy.

A week later, in the second half of the finale, all fifteen eliminated contestants returned and the three finalists each chose their favorite film by an eliminated contestant. Adam chose Die Hardly Working by Zach Lipovsky. Will chose Under the Gun by Hilary Graham. Jason chose Catch by Mateen Kemet. At one point, the host announced the crash of the voting website, which meant that only phoned-in votes would count. Then, Adam was eliminated. Host Adrianna Costa asked the judges who they thought should win the competition and Carrie Fisher chose Will, and Garry Marshall chose Jason. Will became the winner. The last minutes of the show showed Will arriving at the gates of DreamWorks and being met there by Steven Spielberg himself. Spielberg praised a few of Will's films and it ended with them walking through the gates of DreamWorks together.

== Cast ==
The following actors appeared in two or more short films over the course of the series:

- Tatyana Ali
- David Burtka
- Erin Cahill
- Richard Carmen
- Jonathan Chase
- Greg Collins
- Bayne Gibby
- Mark Feuerstein
- Patrick Kerr
- Frederick Koehler
- Joy Osmanski
- Randall Park
- Rich Pierrelouis
- Kimberly Scott
- Ben Seton
- Lin Shaye
- Eric Stonestreet
- John Symonds
- Jackie Tohn
- Janet Varney
- Reginald VelJohnson
- Todd Waring
- Travis Wester
- Kirk Zipfel

== Ratings ==
The premiere episode of On the Lot followed highly rated American Idol, but failed to hold a majority of the Idol audience. Lot had a 6.2 rating/ 9 share from 9 to 10 p.m., retaining just 38 percent of Idol's audience, followed by a loss of 39 percent at 9:30 p.m. (7.7/11 to 4.7/ 7).

The second episode followed another Fox network reality hit, So You Think You Can Dance. However, like its premiere, the ratings did not hold up after the lead-in show ended, losing half of Dance's audience. On the Lot had a 2.1/6 share.

The third episode was two hours long and did not have a lead-in show like the first two episodes. The Fox Network and Univision tied for fourth for the entire night at 1.8/3, behind CBS, ABC and NBC, respectively, which mostly aired reruns. For the targeted audience, Lot averaged a 1.3 adults 18–49 rating, according to Nielsen overnights, placing fifth in its first airing in its regular timeslot, behind even Univision.

Fox tried a different approach for the fourth episode, having it lead-in for the season finale of ratings hit, House. Viewership for Lot was 4 million, or a 1.8/6 share. Coupled with House, Fox had the highest viewership on Tuesday, averaging more than 10 million viewers.

The fifth episode was another attempt at coupling Lot with House, which resulted in worse ratings than the previous week. Fox averaged 5.6 million viewers for the night, third behind NBC, which was tops with America's Got Talent and Deal or No Deal, and CBS, which aired reruns of NCIS. Lot had 3.3 million viewers for its hour-long broadcast of five three-minute flicks.

The sixth episode, which joined Lot with Hell's Kitchen was the first showing that had less than three million viewers. Lot had 1.2/4 share, or 2.8 million viewers, behind top-rated America's Got Talent and the NBA Finals.

According to Nielsen overnights, Lot dipped even lower on its seventh episode, with only a 1.0 rating, tying it with ABC's shows Fast Cars and Superstars and George Lopez. NBC had a commanding lead the entire night, thanks to hit show Talent.

For its finale and the announcement of the winner, the reality series saw a slight bump as it moved up to 1.1/4 in the 18–49 demo, although the net remained well behind the other major broadcasters in the 8 o'clock hour.

== Reception ==
Critics were harshly negative. Variety wrote, "it's hard to imagine this ill-conceived Fox reality show was sold on anything more than the "Steven Spielberg meets Mark Burnett" marquee billing. This awkward mish-mash owes as much to Burnett's "The Apprentice" as to the little-seen "Project Greenlight," and the premiere's weak opening ratings, despite an "American Idol" lead-in Tuesday, don't bode well for a boffo network run."

Matthew Gilbert of the Boston Globe's summary was typical: " "On the Lot" does what every knockoff reality contest does—three judges, a lot of humiliation, a little bit of triumph, some product placement—and it doesn't do it well."

Initial criticism was that the show focused on director quarreling instead of broadcasting the directors' audition short films. In addition, the judges were faulted for not providing helpful criticism. The show host Adrianna Costa was criticized for not being engaging enough. It seemed to critics she had trouble reading her cue cards.

Different formats, seasonal issues, and the contestants' reactions made it clear that the three minute films featured in weeks two, three, and four were made before the Top 50 contestants were picked. They appeared to be the three-minute films, made in a week, that originally got them cast in the Top 50. The reason behind this is unclear. According to an interview with Jason Epperson, the contestants already know who they are up against, and what week their film will be shown.

In July 2007, Jeff Lippencott and Mark T. Williams of Ah2 Music were nominated for an Emmy for Outstanding Main Title Theme Music at the 59th Primetime Emmy Awards for episode 102A.
