= Claudia La Bianca =

American artist and filmmaker

Claudia La Bianca is a Sicilian-American artist and filmmaker. She is best known for her Miami street art and as a finalist on the filmmaking competition show On the Lot. She produced and directed several episodes of the Hannah Help Me! series for PBS and the independent feature The Journey of the Dragonfly.

== Early life ==
La Bianca was born in Sicily. She took to drawing female superheroes in her childhood as a result of being bullied by schoolboys. She was known as the girl who painted walls in her home town of Bagheria, Sicily. After losing her older brother who was a filmmaker, she decided to pursue filmmaking herself.

== Career ==
Following the completion of her studies at New York Film Academy, La Bianca was selected as a top-50 semi-finalist out of more than 12,000 submissions for the filmmaking reality series On the Lot. She helped make the team short film, Out Of Time 2, and made her own short, Blind Date, before finishing in the show's Final 18. La Bianca has gone on to direct several national commercials and music videos. In 2014, she completed her second feature film, The Journey of a Dragonfly, which was shot in Sicily and stars Katarina Morhacova.

La Bianca is known for her vibrant large-scale murals in the Wynwood district of Miami. Her artworks have been featured on CNN, CBS News, and Telemundo and she has sold installations in New York, Los Angeles, Philadelphia, and Italy. She specializes in murals, sculpture, paintings, sketches, characters, and fashion illustrations. La Bianca's works message themes of unity, female empowerment, and individuality. Her 2018 mural, "Unite in Love" drew widespread attention for featuring the embrace of first ladies Michelle Obama and Melania Trump. Following the 2020 COVID-19 pandemic, La Bianca painted a mural titled "Our Heroes" on the Jackson Memorial Hospital in Miami. It features four female nurses stylized as comic superheroes. Several hospitals commissioned similar installations.
