= Miss Ohio =

Beauty pageant competition

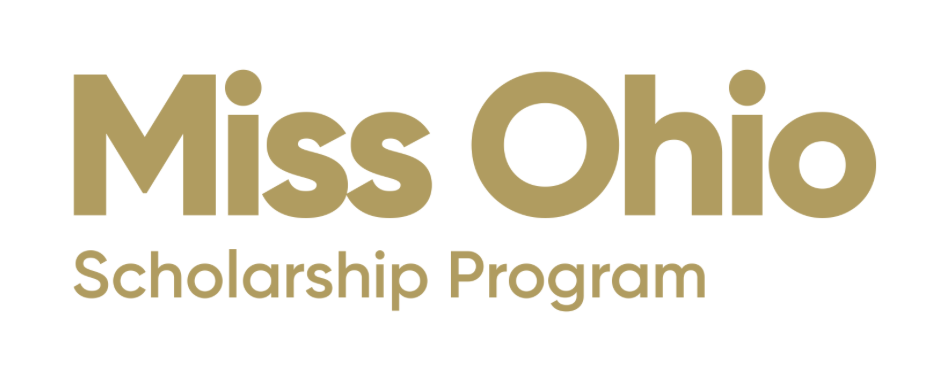
- Formation: 1922
- Type: Beauty pageant
- Headquarters: Mansfield
- Location: Ohio
- Members: Miss America
- Official language: English
- Website: Official website

The Miss Ohio Scholarship Program selects the representative for the U.S. state of Ohio to compete for the title of Miss America. The pageant is held annually, during the "Miss Ohio Festival" week, at the historic 1,600 seat Renaissance Theatre (originally named the Ohio Theatre) in Mansfield.

Ohio representatives have won the Miss America pageant six times, joining California, and Oklahoma as the only states with six crowns. New York has the most winners with seven. Ohio is the only state to have a contestant who won the Miss America title twice:

- 1922 Mary Katherine Campbell, Columbus*
- 1923 Mary Katherine Campbell, Columbus*
- 1938 Marilyn Meseke, Marion
- 1963 Jacquelyn Mayer, Sandusky
- 1972 Laurie Lea Schaefer, Bexley
- 1978 Susan Perkins, Middletown

* When city representatives were common at the national pageant, Mary Katherine Campbell competed in Miss America Pageants as "Miss Columbus, Ohio".

The Miss Ohio pageant played a significant role in the saving of the Ohio Theatre and its renovation into the Renaissance Theatre. Mansfield originally hosted the Miss Ohio Pageant at the old Ohio Theatre from 1959 through 1962. After Jacquelyn Mayer, Miss Ohio 1962, was crowned Miss America 1963, the Miss Ohio pageant was relocated to the Ballroom Pavilion at Cedar Point Amusement Park in Sandusky. In 1975, the pageant returned to Mansfield, first to Malabar High School Auditorium from 1975 through 1978, then to the Madison Theatre in 1979. In 1980, it was decided to televise the pageant. Because of inadequate stage depth and backstage space at the Madison Theatre, then pageant producer Denny Keller and pageant set designer Paul Gilger persuaded the Miss Ohio Board of Directors to move the pageant back to Mansfield's Ohio Theatre, reopening the facility and sprucing it up for the pageant's first televised broadcast. The pageant's return to the old Ohio Theatre was the initial event that eventually led to the total renovation of the theatre and its reincarnation into the Renaissance Theatre. The Miss Ohio Scholarship Program has been held at the Renaissance Theatre since 1980, now for over 40 years.

Lexie Miller of Newark was crowned Miss Ohio 2026 on June 20, 2026, at the Archer Auditorium at Ashland High School in Ashland, Ohio. She competed for the title of Miss America 2027 on September 6, 2026, at the Kravis Center for the Performing Arts in West Palm Beach, Florida.

== Results summary ==
The following is a visual summary of the past results of Miss Ohio titleholders at the national Miss America pageants/competitions. The year in parentheses indicates the year of the national competition during which a placement and/or award was garnered, not the year attached to the contestant's state title.

=== Placements ===
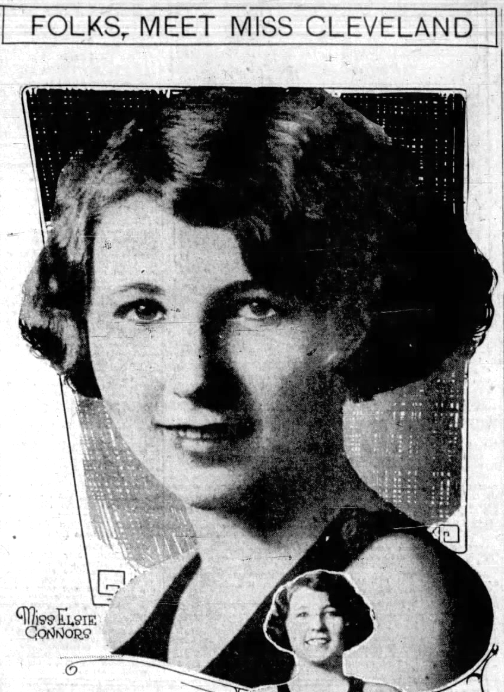
- Miss Cleveland 1925, Elsie Connor
  Miss Americas: Mary Katherine Campbell (1922 and 1923), Marilyn Meseke (1938), Jacquelyn Mayer (1963), Laurie Lea Schaefer (1972), Susan Perkins (1978)
- 1st runners-up: Mary Katherine Campbell (1924), Kathrine Baumann (1970), Tana Carli (1980), Melissa Ann Bradley (1985)
- 2nd runners-up: Titilayo Adedokun (1994)
- 3rd runners-up: Sharon Phillian (1967), Susan Banks (1976), Sher Patrick (1979)
- 4th runners-up: Pamela Helean Rigas (1984), Kristin Huffman (1990), Stephanie Finoti (2025)
- Top 10: Barbara Quinlin (1955), Kathleen Ann Vernon (1981), Suellen Cochran (1986), Robin Michelle Meade (1993), Lea Mack (1995), Mackenzie Bart (2015)
- Top 11: Elizabetta Nies (2023)
- Top 15: Pauline James (1924), Elsie Connor (1925), Evelyn Townley (1936), Evelyn Bertelsbeck (1938), Janice Sulzman (1941)
- Top 16: Evelyn Townley (1937), Jean Fadden (1937), LaVonne Bond (1946)
- Top 18: Corinne Porter (1933)

=== Awards ===
==== Preliminary awards ====
- Preliminary Lifestyle and Fitness: Kathrine Baumann (1970), Laurie Lea Schaefer (1972), Pamela Helean Rigas (1984), Suellen Cochran (1986), Alice Magoto (2017), Stephanie Finoti (2025)
- Preliminary Talent: Barbara Patterson (1942), Joan Hyldoft (1943), Barbara Quinlin (1955), Sharon Phillian (1967), Kathrine Baumann (1970), Susan Banks (1976), Susan Perkins (1978), Tana Carli (1980), Suellen Cochran (1986), Kristin Huffman (1990), Titilayo Adedokun (1994), Mackenzie Bart (2015)

==== Non-finalist awards ====
- Non-finalist Talent: Karen Sparka (1973), Cheryl Yourkvitch (1974), Lorrie Kapsta (1975), Janice Cooley (1977), Juliana Zilba (1982), Sarah Ann Evans (1989), Robyn Hancock (1997), Amanda Beagle (2005)

==== Other awards ====
- Miss Congeniality: N/A
- Dr. David B. Allman Medical Scholarship: Juliana Zilba (1982)
- Charles & Theresa Brown Scholarship: Mackenzie Bart (2015)
- Evening Dress Award Third Prize: Mary Katherine Campbell (1922)
- Intercity Beauty Award: Mary Katherine Campbell (1922)
- Intercity Roller Chair Parade Third Prize: Leile Charles (1922)
- Quality of Life Award 2nd runners-up: Lea Mack (1995), Tiffany Haas (2003)
- Quality of Life Award Finalists: Ellen Bryan (2012)
- STEM Scholarship Award Winners: Mackenzie Bart (2015)
- Women in Business Scholarship Award Winners: Sarah Clapper (2018)

== Winners ==
- Declared as winner
- Ended as a runner-up
- Ended as a finalist or semi-finalist

Year	Name	Hometown	Age	Local Title	Miss America Talent	Placement at Miss America	Special scholarships at Miss America	Notes
2026	Lexie Miller	Newark	23	Miss South Central	Vocal			
2025	Olivia Fosson	Kitts Hill	24	Miss Clayland	Classical Vocal, Opera			
2024	Stephanie Finoti	Columbus	21	Miss Shawnee	Ballet en Pointe, "Kitri Act III" and "Don Quixote"	4th Runner-up	Preliminary Lifestyle & Fitness Award	First Latina Miss Ohio
2023	Madison Miller	Coshocton	23	Miss North Coast	Classical Piano			
2022	Elizabetta Nies	Cincinnati	18	Miss Maple City	Piano, "Étude Op. 10, No. 10"	Top 11		Daughter of Miss Illinois 1992 and Miss Illinois USA 1994, Kathleen Farrell Niece of Miss Florida 1985 and Miss Florida USA 1988, Monica Farrell and of Miss New York 1984, Mary-Ann Farrell
2021	Lora Current	Rosewood	20	Miss South Central Ohio	Jazz Dance			
2019–20	Caroline Grace Williams	Cincinnati	24	Miss Montgomery County	Classical Vocal			
2018	Matti-Lynn Chrisman	Cambridge	22	Miss Maple City	Musical Theater Vocal, "Life of the Party" from Wild Party			
2017	Sarah Clapper	Louisville	22	Miss Clayland	Piano, "White Water Chopsticks"		Charles & Theresa Brown Scholarship Women in Business Scholarship Award	
2016	Alice Magoto	Cincinnati	18	Miss Portsmouth	Vocal, "Astonishing" from Little Women		Preliminary Lifestyle & Fitness Award	Later Miss Ohio USA 2019; Top 10 at Miss USA 2019 pageant
2015	Sarah Hider	Wooster	24	Miss Maple City	Jazz Vocal, "Almost Like Being in Love"			Previously Miss Ohio's Outstanding Teen 2008
2014	Mackenzie Bart	Columbus	22	Miss Montgomery County	Ventriloquism, "Supercalifragilisticexpialidocious" from Mary Poppins	Top 10	Charles & Theresa Brown Scholarship Preliminary Talent Award STEM Scholarship Award	Winner of Funny or Die Presents: America's Next Weatherman
2013	Heather Wells	Warren	23	Miss Montgomery County	Dance, "Alabaster Box"			
2012	Elissa McCracken	Ada	20	Miss West Central Ohio	Piano, "Cumana"			
2011	Ellen Bryan	Celina	22	Miss Clayland	Vocal, "On My Way" from Violet		Quality of Life Award Finalist	
2010	Becky Minger	Sylvania	22	Miss All-American City	Vocal, "A House Is Not a Home"			Top 10 at National Sweetheart 2008 and 2009 pageants 3rd runner-up in Miss Ohio USA 2012 pageant 4th runner-up in Miss Ohio USA 2013 pageant
2009	Erica Gelhaus	St. Henry	21	Miss Clayland	Classical Vocal, "So Anch'io la Virtu Magica" from Don Pasquale			Previously National Sweetheart 2007
2008	Karissa Martin	Woodsfield	20	Miss Clayland	Vocal, "The Girl in 14-G"			
2007	Roberta Camp	Grove City	23	Miss Maple City	Vocal, "Blessed"			Top 15 Miss Ohio USA 2006
2006	Melanie Murphy	Brook Park	20	Miss Miami Valley	Dance, "Pump It"			Later Mrs. Ohio America 2011 under married name, Melanie Miller
2005	Marlia Fontaine	Massillon	23	Miss Lake Erie	Vocal, "The Impossible Dream"			
2004	Amanda Beagle	Warren	24	Miss Lake Erie	Classical Vocal, "Quando me'n vo'"		Non-finalist Talent Award	Top 10 at National Sweetheart 2003 pageant
2003	Janelle Couts	Akron	22	Miss Medina	Vocal, "When I Look at You" from The Scarlet Pimpernel			
2002	Tiffany Haas	Cincinnati	20	Miss Heart of it All	Classical Vocal, "Glitter and Be Gay" from Candide		Quality of Life Award 2nd runner-up	Later starred as Glinda in Broadway and national touring productions of Wicked
2001	Natalie Witwer	Dublin	19	Miss Ashland	Piano, "America the Beautiful"			
2000	Stephanie Meisberger	Hopewell	23	Miss North Coast	Vocal, "You Do Something to Me"			Contestant at National Sweetheart 1999 pageant
1999	Tiffany Baumann	Cleveland	22	Miss Greater Cleveland	Vocal, "But the World Goes Round" by Kander and Ebb			Niece of Miss Ohio 1969, Kathrine Baumann
1998	Cheya Watkins	Cincinnati	21	Miss Southeastern Ohio	Gospel Vocal, "His Eye Is on the Sparrow"			Later Miss Ohio USA 2000
1997	Kelly Creager	Hamler	19	Miss Conneaut	Vocal, "Remember Me This Way" from Casper			
1996	Robyn Hancock	Grand Rapids	21	Miss Crestline	Classical Ballet en Pointe, "Dance of the Sugar Plum Fairy" from The Nutcracker		Non-finalist Talent Award	
1995	Ellen Pasturzak	Portsmouth	23	Miss Portsmouth	Vocal, "As if We Never Said Goodbye" from Sunset Boulevard			
1994	Lea Mack	Pickerington	21	Miss Pickerington-America	Vocal, "Think of Me"	Top 10	Quality of Life Award 2nd runner-up	Previously Ohio's Junior Miss 1991
1993	Titilayo Adedokun	Cincinnati	20	Miss Americana	Classical Vocal, "The Jewel Song" from Faust	2nd runner-up	Preliminary Talent Award	
1992	Robin Michelle Meade	New London	23	Miss Mansfield	Vocal, "Alexander's Ragtime Band"	Top 10		Lead news anchor for HLN morning show, Morning Express with Robin Meade, since 2011
1991	Renee Autherson	Newark	21	Miss Central Ohio	Vocal / Tap Dance, "Fabulous Feet" from The Tap Dance Kid			
1990	Kristi Cooke	Marion	22	Miss Willard	Vocal, "Nothing" from A Chorus Line			
1989	Kristin Huffman	Canal Winchester	24	Miss Pickerington-America	Classical Vocal, "Csárdás" from Die Fledermaus	4th runner-up	Preliminary Talent Award	
1988	Sarah Ann Evans	Van Wert	23	Miss Pickerington-America	Vocal, "Wishing You Were Somehow Here Again" from The Phantom of the Opera		Non-finalist Talent Award	
1987	Susan Kay Johnson	Columbus	22	Miss Canton	Vocal, "Believe"			
1986	Mary Zilba	Toledo	22	Miss Greater Toledo	Vocal, "My Mammy"			Sister of Miss Ohio 1981, Juliana Zilba Later appeared on The Real Housewives of Vancouver
1985	Suellen Cochran	Heath	21	Miss Southeastern Ohio	Piano, "Variations on Chopsticks"	Top 10	Preliminary Swimsuit Award Preliminary Talent Award	
1984	Melissa Ann Bradley	Mansfield	23	Miss Clayland	Vocal, "A Piece of Sky" from Yentl	1st runner-up		Mother of actor, Chad Buchanan
1983	Pamela Helean Rigas	Canfield	22	Miss Cuyahoga County Fair	Vocal / Dance, "Shine it On"	4th runner-up	Preliminary Swimsuit Award	Previously Ohio's Junior Miss 1978 Previously Miss Alabama USA 1980; 3rd runner-up at Miss USA 1980 pageant
1982	Debra Gombert	Bexley	22	Miss North Central	Semi-classical Vocal, "Love Is Where You Find It"			
1981	Juliana Zilba	Mansfield	21	Miss North Central	Vocal Medley, "Up the Ladder to the Roof" & "With One More Look at You" from A Star Is Born		Dr. David B. Allman Medical Scholarship Non-finalist Talent Award	Sister of Miss Ohio 1986, Mary Zilba
1980	Kathleen "Kathy" Ann Vernon	Youngstown	24	Miss North Central	Vocal Medley, "I Have Dreamed" & "I Loved You Once in Silence"	Top 10		Kathleen "Kathy" Ann Vernon died at age 68 on August 23, 2024 after a battle with pancreatic cancer in Malvern, Pennsylvania.
1979	Tana Carli	Lakewood	23	Miss Willard	Accordion Medley, "Tea for Two" & "Dizzy Fingers"	1st runner-up	Preliminary Talent Award	
1978	Sher Patrick	Centerville	19	Miss South Central	Middle-Eastern Dance	3rd runner-up		
1977	Joan Gilger	Mansfield	21	Miss Bowling Green	Gymnastic Trampoline	Did not compete; originally 4th runner-up; later assumed the title after Perkins won Miss America 1978		
1977	Susan Perkins	Middletown	23	Miss Clayland	Vocal, "Good Morning Heartache"	Winner	Preliminary Talent Award	Judge for the preliminary competition of the Miss America 2018 pageant
1976	Janice Cooley	Portsmouth	20	Miss Ohio Valley	Piano, "Mephisto Waltz"		Non-finalist Talent Award	
1975	Susan Banks	Ravenna	24	Miss Warren	Classical Vocal, "Sempre libera" from La traviata	3rd runner-up	Preliminary Talent Award	
1974	Lorrie Kapsta	Columbus	26	Miss Franklin County	Classical Piano, "Piano Concerto in B Minor" by Tchaikovsky		Non-finalist Talent Award	
1973	Cheryl Yourkvitch	Lorain	21	Miss Lorain County	Vocal Medley		Non-finalist Talent Award	
1972	Karen Sparka	Bowling Green	21	Miss Bowling Green	Vocal Medley, "My Man" & "My Man's Gone Now"		Non-finalist Talent Award	
1971	Judy Jones	West Alexandria	19	Miss Miami University		Did not compete; later assumed the title after Schaefer won Miss America 1972		
1971	Laurie Lea Schaefer	Bexley	22	Miss Central Ohio	Semi-classical Vocal, "And This Is My Beloved"	Winner	Preliminary Swimsuit Award	
1970	Grace Bird	Alliance	21	Miss Alliance	French Horn & Classical Vocal, "1st Concerto for French Horn" & "Ouvre ton Coeur" from Vasco da Gama by Georges Bizet			
1969	Kathrine Baumann	Bowling Green	19	Miss Bowling Green	Gymnastics Dance, "Those Were the Days"	1st runner-up	Preliminary Swimsuit Award Preliminary Talent Award	Aunt of Miss Ohio 1999, Tiffany Baumann
1968	Leslyn Hiple	Louisville	19	Miss Canton	Vocal Medley, "If My Friends Could See Me Now" & "I'm a Brass Band" from Sweet Charity			
1967	Pamela Robinson	Dayton	22	Miss Dayton	Vocal, "Oh, to Be a Movie Star" from The Apple Tree			Previously Ohio's Junior Miss 1963; 3rd runner-up at America's Junior Miss 1963 pageant
1966	Sharon Phillian	Delaware	21	Miss Delaware	Vocal Medley, "This Is My Country" & "Où va la jeune Hindoue" from Lakme	3rd runner-up	Preliminary Talent Award	Contestant at National Sweetheart 1965 pageant
1965	Valerie Lavin	Canton	20	Miss Canton	Vocal / Dance, "I Ought to Dance"			
1964	Diane Courtwright	Columbus	19	Miss Columbus	Popular Vocal & Modern Jazz Dance			
1963	Peggy Emerson	Akron		Miss Akron	Semi-classical Vocal, "And This Is my Beloved"			
1962	Bonne Gawronski	Toledo	19	Miss Toledo	Modern Jazz Interpretation of "Let There Be Drums"	Did not compete; later assumed the title after Mayer won Miss America 1963		
1962	Jacquelyn Mayer	Sandusky	20	Miss Vacationland	Broadway Vignette, "Wishing Upon a Star," "My Favorite Things," & "The White Cliffs of Dover"	Winner		Had a near-fatal stroke at the age of 28
1961	Darlene Depasquale	Dayton	18	Miss Dayton	Comedy Skit, "Betty at the Baseball Game"			
1960	Alice Alice McClain	Marion	18	Miss Marion	Vocal, "Summertime" & "I Got Plenty of Nothin"			Alice McClain Young died at age 83 on December 14, 2025 in Leawood, Kansas.
1959	Carole Weiler	Circleville	18	Miss Circleville	Dramatic Reading			
1958	Margaret Putman	Ada		Miss Ada	Dramatic Sketch, "Student Nurse"			
1957	Linda Hattman	Mansfield		Miss Mansfield	Ballet			
1956	Roberta Palmer	Cleveland		Miss Cleveland	Vocal, "On the Street Where You Live" from My Fair Lady			Mother of Matthew Porretta
1955	Marguerite Garr	Cincinnati		Miss Cincinnati	Vocal & Zither, "Old Black Joe"			
1954	Barbara Quinlin	Alliance		Miss Alliance	Classical Vocal, "Habanera"	Top 10	Preliminary Talent Award	
1953	Martha Zimmerman	Salem		Miss Salem	Drama / Piano			
1952	Carol Koontz	Bolivar		Miss Bolivar	Fire Baton Twirling & Clarinet			
1951	Ruth Howell	Apple Creek		Miss Apple Creek	Drama			
1950	Irene Farren	Grand River		Miss Grand River	Fashion Design			
1949	Florence Christine Bondi	Cleveland	19	Miss Cleveland	Tap Routine			
1948	Maxine Marie Ann Waack	Fairview	18	Miss Fairview	Rumba Dance			
1947	Nancy Nesbitt	Cleveland		Miss Cleveland	Vocal, "I Don't Know Enough About You"			
1946	LaVonne Bond	Cincinnati		Miss Cincinnati	Vocal, "Thine Alone" from Eileen	Top 16		Multiple Ohio representatives Competed under local title at Miss America pageant
1946	Mary Eileen Kelly	Cleveland		Miss Cleveland				Multiple Ohio representatives Competed under local title at Miss America pageant
1945	Julia Donahue	Oxford		Miss Ohio				Multiple Ohio representatives Competed under local title at Miss America pageant
1945	Virginia Lee Pleasant	Cincinnati		Miss Cincinnati				Multiple Ohio representatives Competed under local title at Miss America pageant
1944	Madeline Bohanon	Cincinnati		Miss Cincinnati				Competed under local title at national pageant
1943	Joan Hyldoft	Cincinnati		Miss Cincinnati	Ice Skating		Preliminary Talent Award	Competed under local title at national pageant
1942	Barbara Patterson	Cincinnati		Miss Cincinnati			Preliminary Talent Award	Competed under local title at national pageant
1941	Lois Jean Beck	Cleveland		Miss Cleveland				Multiple Ohio representatives Competed under local title at Miss America pageant
1941	Janice Sulzman	Willoughby		Miss Ohio		Top 15		Multiple Ohio representatives Competed under local title at Miss America pageant
1940	Violet Berze	Steubenville		Miss Ohio				Multiple Ohio representatives Competed under local title at Miss America pageant
1940	Bette Jane Hart			Miss Central Ohio				Multiple Ohio representatives Competed under local title at Miss America pageant
1939	Maxine Drumm			Miss East Ohio				Multiple Ohio representatives Competed under local title at Miss America pageant
1939	Jeanne Saboda	Cleveland		Miss Ohio				Multiple Ohio representatives Competed under local title at Miss America pageant
1938	Evelyn Bertelsbeck	Cleveland		Miss Cleveland		Top 15		Multiple Ohio representatives Competed under local title at Miss America pageant
1938	Marilyn Meseke	Marion	21	Miss Ohio	Tap Dance, "How'd You Like to Love Me," "The World Is Waiting for the Sunrise," & "Joseph, Joseph"	Winner		Multiple Ohio representatives Competed under local title at Miss America pageant
1937	Jean Fadden	Cleveland		Miss Ohio		Top 16		Multiple Ohio representatives Competed under local title at Miss America pageant
1937	Sally Lillian Frank	Cincinnati		Miss Cincinnati				Multiple Ohio representatives Competed under local title at Miss America pageant
1937	Evelyn Townley			Miss Buckeye Lake		Top 16		Multiple Ohio representatives Competed under local title at Miss America pageant
1936	Dorothy A. Duncan	Cincinnati		Miss Cincinnati				Multiple Ohio representatives Competed under local title at Miss America pageant
1936	Evelyn Townley			Miss Buckeye Lake	Acrobatic Dance	Top 15		Multiple Ohio representatives Competed under local title at Miss America pageant
1935	Beatrice Pfeiffer	Cincinnati		Miss Cincinnati	Vocal			Multiple Ohio representatives Competed under local title at Miss America pageant
1935	Eleanore Papin	Cleveland		Miss Cleveland				Multiple Ohio representatives Competed under local title at Miss America pageant
1934	No national pageant was held							
1933	Corinne Porter		18	Miss Ohio		Top 18		
1932	No national pageants were held							
1931	No national pageants were held							
1930	No national pageants were held							
1929	No national pageants were held							
1928	No national pageants were held							
1927	Erma Shorwood Steele			Miss Canton	N/A			Multiple Ohio representatives Competed under local title at Miss America pageant
1927	Evelyn Wilgus	Russells Point		Miss Ohio	N/A			Multiple Ohio representatives Competed under local title at Miss America pageant
1925	Elsie Connor			Miss Cleveland	N/A	Top 15		Multiple Ohio representatives Competed under local title at Miss America pageant
1925	Elarka Towne	Conneaut		Miss Ohio	N/A			Multiple Ohio representatives Competed under local title at Miss America pageant
1925	Emilia Kaniewska			Miss Toledo	N/A			Multiple Ohio representatives Competed under local title at Miss America pageant
1925	Isabel Robertson			Miss Youngstown	N/A			Multiple Ohio representatives Competed under local title at Miss America pageant
1924	Mary Katherine Campbell	Columbus	17	Miss America 1922 and 1923	N/A	1st runner-up		Multiple Ohio representatives Competed under local title at Miss America pageant
1924	Lenore O'Ryan			Miss Columbus	N/A			Multiple Ohio representatives Competed under local title at Miss America pageant
1924	Pauline James			Miss Youngstown	N/A	Top 15		Multiple Ohio representatives Competed under local title at Miss America pageant
1923	Thelma Boyd	Akron		Miss Akron	N/A			Multiple Ohio representatives Competed under local title at Miss America pageant
1923	Mary Katherine Campbell	Columbus	16	Miss America 1922	N/A	Winner		Competed as Miss America 1922 Successfully defended her title, the only woman to win the national pageant twice
1923	Olga Emrick	Cincinnati		Miss Cincinnati	N/A			Multiple Ohio representatives Competed under local title at Miss America pageant
1923	Mary Jane Clark	Cleveland		Miss Cleveland	N/A			Multiple Ohio representatives Competed under local title at Miss America pageant
1923	Genevieve Mambourg	Columbus		Miss Columbus	N/A			Multiple Ohio representatives Competed under local title at Miss America pageant
1922	Doris Widdersheim	Akron		Miss Akron	N/A			Multiple Ohio representatives Competed under local title at Miss America pageant
1922	Leile Charles	Cleveland		Miss Cleveland	N/A		Intercity Roller Chair Parade Third Prize	Multiple Ohio representatives Competed under local title at Miss America pageant
1922	Mary Katherine Campbell	Columbus	15	Miss Columbus	N/A	Winner	Intercity Beauty Award Evening Dress Award Third Prize	Multiple Ohio representatives Competed under local title at Miss America pageant
1922	Helen Frances Smith	Dayton		Miss Dayton	N/A			Multiple Ohio representatives Competed under local title at Miss America pageant
1922	Loraine Foskey	Toledo		Miss Toledo	N/A			Multiple Ohio representatives Competed under local title at Miss America pageant
1921	No Ohio representative at Miss America pageant							
