= Shanon Cook =

- Born: Melbourne, Australia
- Education: Queensland University of Technology (B.A., journalism)
- Occupation: Media personality
- Children: 2

Shanon Cook is an Australian entertainment journalist and producer based in the United States. A former CNN entertainment reporter, she currently works as a spokesperson for the music streaming service Spotify, where she appears on TV and radio and talks to online and print media about music trends as well as popular and emerging artists.

== Career ==
Cook has appeared as a pop culture expert on Entertainment Tonight, BBC America, CBS, CBSN, ABC News and CNET as well as CNN, where she worked for 12 years as a producer and reporter, mainly covering music and entertainment. In 2004-05 Cook presented daily live entertainment reports on the HLN morning show Robin and Co., now known as Morning Express with Robin Meade. In 2002-04 Cook was a producer and reporter for the CNN International show The Music Room, a half-hour show about popular bands and artists. In 2007 she hosted four specials for CNN.com about music and the arts. During her tenure at CNN, Cook interviewed entertainment figures such as Kanye West, Britney Spears, Alicia Keys, Sting, Pharrell, Annie Lennox, Jennifer Lopez, and Yo-Yo Ma. Cook was one of the last reporters to interview the band R.E.M. before they disbanded in 2011, and she reported live from Washington DC on the entertainment surrounding the inauguration of President Barack Obama. Cook also hosted an interview segment called Music & Conversation with Shanon Cook which aired on CNN International and CNN.com.

Aside from reporting on showbiz, Cook has covered business news for CNN International, breaking world news for CNN’s weekend broadcasts, and has anchored live news on CNN.com. In February 2008 Cook was a correspondent for Full Frontal Fashion and covered New York Fashion Week in Fall 2008 and Spring 2009, interviewing designers and celebrities like Marc Jacobs, Diane von Furstenberg, and Donna Karan. Cook also hosted a travel series called MIA: Most Interesting Assistant that aired on MOJO HD and was a regular host of Firebrand on ION Television, a show about TV commercials. Cook appears as reporter Cassandra Blair during the live-action video scenes of EA's Command and Conquer 3: Tiberium Wars which was released in March 2007.

As a writer, Cook's work has been published on CNN.com, in Billboard Magazine and on Refinery29, and she released an e-book, The Baby Bumps, a autobiographical account of combining motherhood with a career in the television business.

Cook joined Spotify as the company's global trends expert and spokesperson in 2013.

== Personal life ==
Cook was born in Melbourne, Australia and graduated from the Queensland University of Technology in Brisbane, Australia with a Bachelor of Arts degree, majoring in journalism.
