= Susan Perkins =

American model, singer and reporter

Susan Yvonne Perkins Botsford
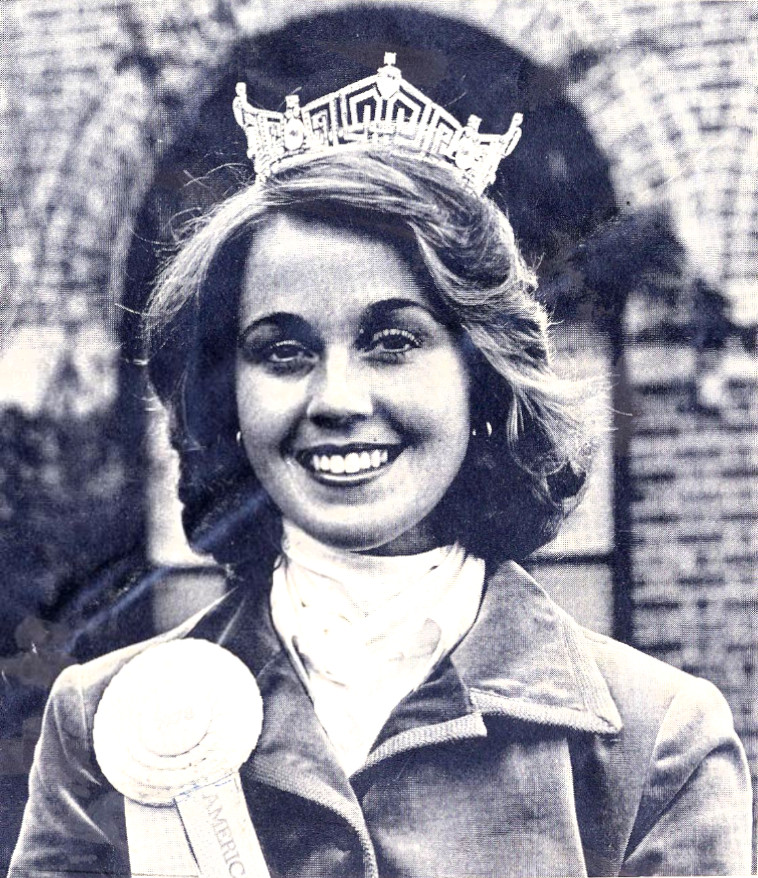
- Perkins in 1977
- Born: April 28, 1954 (age 72); Middletown, Ohio, U.S.
- Occupations: Professional singer, spokesperson, television reporter
- Title: Miss Clayland 1977; Miss Ohio 1977; Miss America 1978
- Predecessor: Dorothy Benham
- Successor: Kylene Barker
- Spouse: Alan C. Botsford Jr. (m. 1979)
- Children: 2

Susan Perkins Botsford (born April 28, 1954), a native of Middletown, Ohio, is a pageant winner who was crowned Miss America in 1978.

She has been a professional singer, spokesperson, and television reporter. Susan walked in the New York Marathon with the Achilles Club (which serves disabled and senior athletes) as a guide for an 80-year-old former Marine Colonel. She has participated in many volunteer activities supporting U.S. veterans, and in 2009 she toured Iraq with two other former Miss Americas.

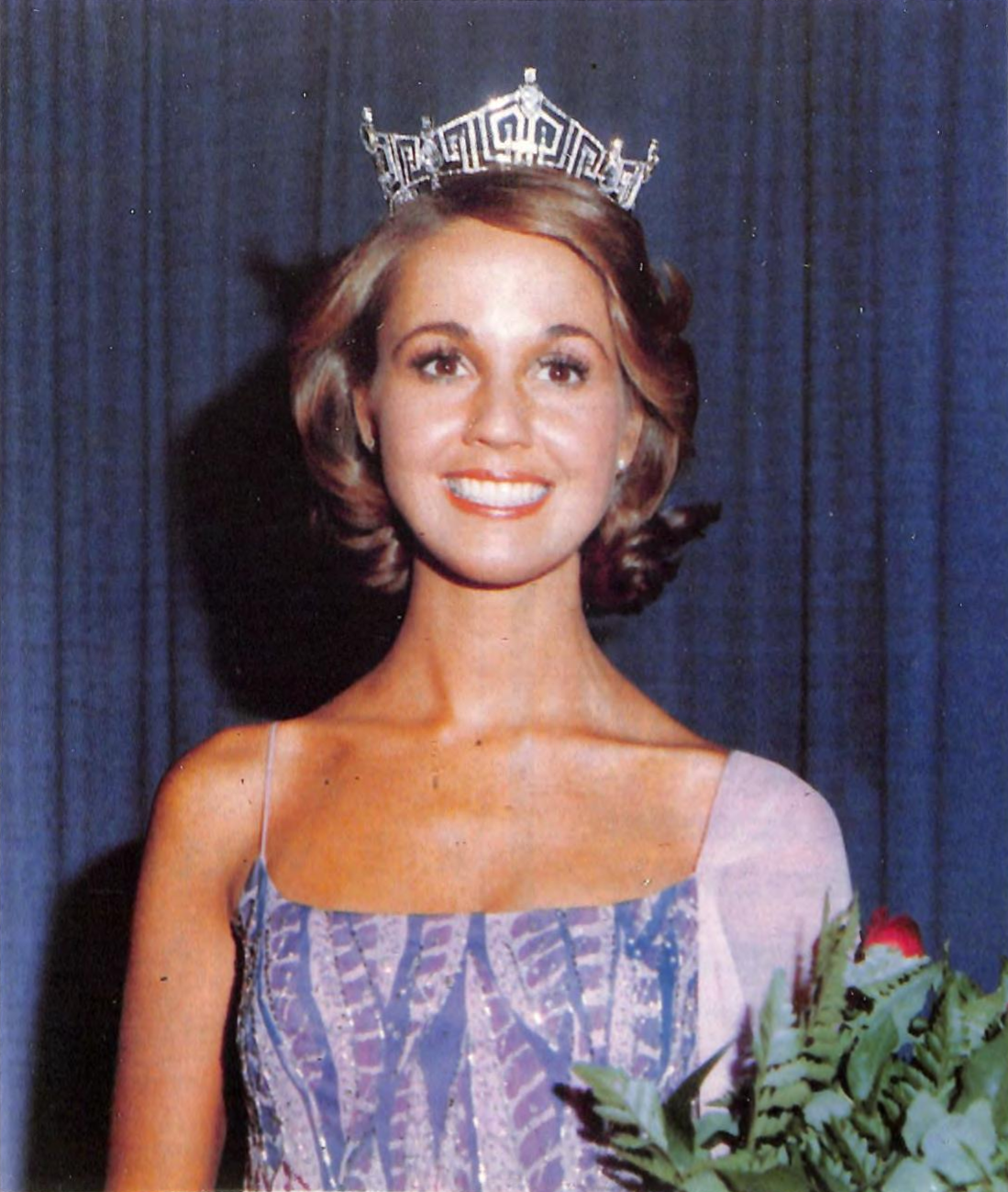
Susan Perkins as winner of Miss America 1978

Perkins Botsford was selected to the panel of judges for the preliminary competition of the Miss America 2018 pageant.

== Personal life ==
She married Alan C. Botsford Jr., the president of Benson Botsford LLC, in May 1979. They reside in Boston, Massachusetts and Cape Cod. Together they have two children, Trip and Brooke. Brooke is married to William Sinclair. William is the Co-CEO of J.P. Morgan U.S. Private Bank.
