= Lynn Smith =

American news anchor and producer

Lynn Marie Smith
- Born: Lynn Marie Markowsky
- Other name: Lynn Berry
- Education: Miami University
- Employer(s): NBC News (2010–2013); HLN (2013–2021); Rylan Media (2021–present)
- Spouse: Graham Smith
- Children: 2

Lynn Marie Smith is an American media consultant and former news anchor. She previously worked with HLN having anchored Weekend Express. She was later named the host of On The Story in March 2019.

== Early life ==
Smith graduated from Miami University in Ohio, where she majored in Mass Communications and wrote for the university newspaper. Following graduation, she interned with the Academy of Television Arts and Sciences in Los Angeles. In 2001, she joined the NBC Page Program in Los Angeles and then moved east where she joined NBC's Today.

== Career ==
At NBC News, Smith served as the anchor of Early Today and MSNBC's First Look since 2010. During that time, she was also a fill-in newsreader on Weekend Today and covered overnight breaking news at MSNBC.

The year prior, Smith had been a general assignment reporter and fill-in anchor at WNBC's local station "News 4 New York." Earlier, at NBC-owned station WCAU, Philadelphia, she served as general assignment reporter since June 2007. In January 2008, her role was expanded and she was promoted to co-anchor of "NBC 10 Weekend Today" on Saturday and Sunday mornings.

Prior to her work at WCAU, Smith worked behind the camera at NBC's Today as an associate producer and was later promoted to producer. In 2007, her role expanded to online correspondent for todayshow.com, with several of her pieces featured on Today. She was also a freelance general assignment reporter for NBC-owned station WVIT in Hartford, Connecticut.

In 2013, Smith joined HLN, and began as an interim host of Weekend Express following Natasha Curry's departure. In May 2014, Smith was named the official host.

Following a maternity leave, in March 2019, she hosted the news program On the Story, which had been previously anchored by Erica Hill. In June 2021, Smith announced her departure from HLN to form her own media consulting firm Rylan Media. Since January 2022, Smith has hosted Munchkin Inc.'s podcast, "StrollerCoaster: A Parenting Podcast."

== Personal life ==
In 2015, she married Graham Smith in Highlands, North Carolina.
