= Jennifer Westhoven =

American reporter

- Education: Bryn Mawr College
- Occupation: Correspondent
- Notable credit: Morning Express with Robin Meade

Jennifer Westhoven is an American reporter, currently a correspondent for HLN. She covers the economy, business, personal finance and money topics. She has been with the CNN network since 2000, starting with CNNfn. She previously worked for Reuters from 1993 to 2000.

Westhoven grew up in Cranford, New Jersey and earned a Bachelor of Arts degree in history and political science from Bryn Mawr College.

Since 2006, she has been a part of the HLN morning show Morning Express with Robin Meade. Her regular segment throughout the morning on "Morning Express" and the Mid-Morning Block of HLN is called Your Money. She also appears regularly in the network's weekend Clark Howard show and fills in anchoring HLN's weekend newscasts. Now based in Atlanta, she formerly reported from CNN's NYC headquarters, as well as the New York Stock Exchange and NASDAQ.

She is also a contributor to the weekend CNN program Your Money, which airs on Saturday and Sunday afternoons.
