= Lea Mack =

- Education: Florida State University
- Occupations: Motivational speaker and singer
- Beauty pageant titleholder
- Title: Miss Pickerington-America 1994; Miss Ohio 1994
- Major competition: Miss America 1995

Lea Mack (a native of Pickerington, Ohio, born 1973) was Miss Ohio 1994.

Lea Mack was Miss Ohio for 1994, and she placed in the top ten for Miss America. She has been a professional music therapist, spokeswoman, and author. Lea is currently the owner of her own company, Dream Big Enterprises, L.L.C.

== Education ==
Lea Mack relieved a bachelor's degree in music therapy from Florida State University.

Preceded by Titilayo Adedokun	Miss Ohio; 1994	Succeeded by Ellen Pasturzak
