= Robin Meade =

American television news anchor (born 1969)

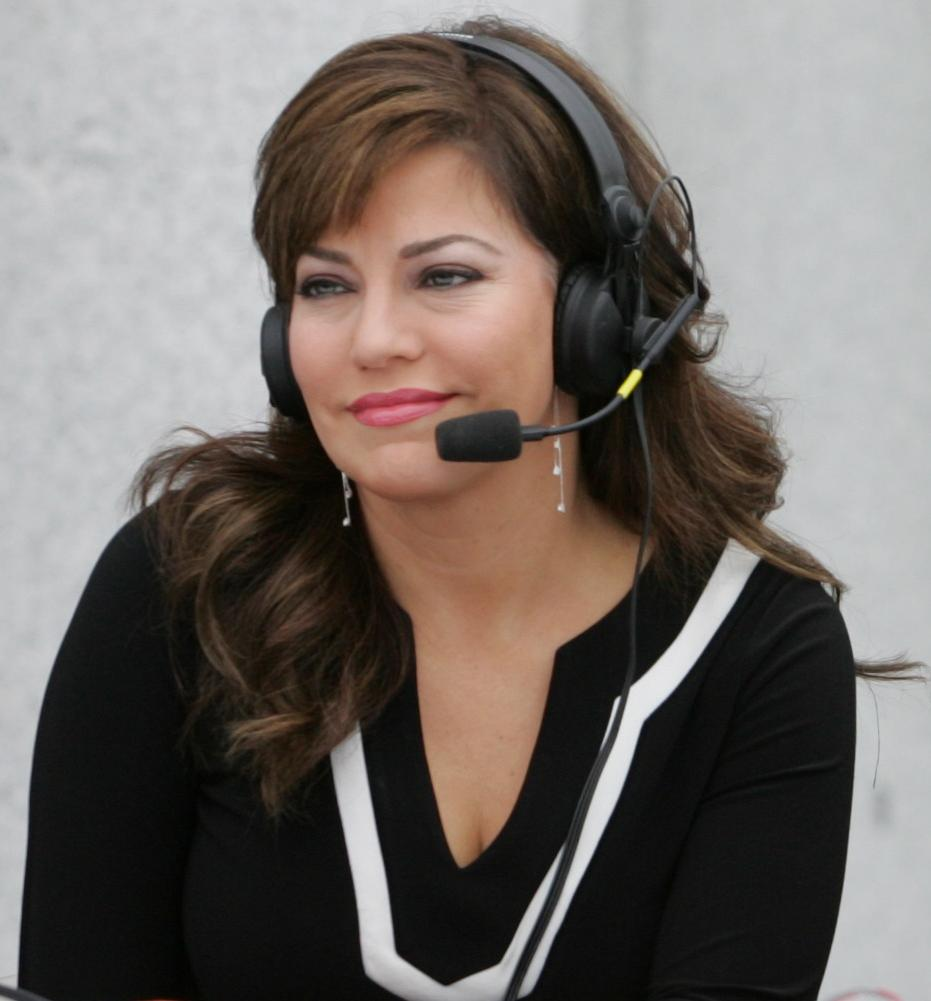
- Meade in 2009
- Born: Robin Michelle Meade; April 21, 1969 (age 57); New London, Ohio, U.S.
- Education: Ashland University; Malone University
- Occupations: broadcaster, host, singer
- Notable credit: Lead news anchor for Morning Express with Robin Meade on HLN
- Spouse: Tim Yeager (m. 1993)
- Relatives: Blake Shelton (fourth cousin)

Robin Michelle Meade (born April 21, 1969) is an American former television news correspondent and singer. She was the lead news anchor for HLN's morning show Morning Express with Robin Meade. Meade was a former Miss Ohio and began her broadcasting career with local stations in Ohio. She joined HLN in 2001. She won a regional Emmy Award. Meade released country music albums in 2011 and 2013.

== Early life ==
Meade grew up in New London, Ohio and graduated from New London High School. She attended Malone University and Ashland University, where she majored in radio/television production, programming and performance and minored in political science. She graduated in 1991.

== Career ==
In 1992, Meade became Miss Ohio, and was a semi-finalist in the 1993 Miss America pageant.

Meade began her career in broadcasting as a reporter at WMFD-TV in Mansfield, Ohio. She then worked as an anchor and reporter at WCMH-TV in Columbus, Ohio, and at WJW-TV in Cleveland. Later, she got a job in Miami, Florida as the morning news anchor of WSVN-TV's Today in Florida and also served as the station's noon anchor and health reporter.

She went on to work at NBC Chicago affiliate WMAQ-TV where she started anchoring the morning newscasts and then co-anchored the weekend newscasts and also served as a general assignment correspondent for the station. During her tenure with the NBC affiliate, she covered the 1996 Olympics, which included special reporting on the Centennial Olympic Park bombing.

She then joined HLN, then known as CNN Headline News. Meade anchored the network's coverage of Operation Enduring Freedom as well as that from Operation Iraqi Freedom in the spring of 2003. She was based in CNN's world headquarters in Atlanta. Her first day on-air at HLN was September 11, 2001, the same day as the September 11 attacks. Meade hosted Robin & Company (later renamed to Morning Express with Robin Meade) on HLN on weekday mornings, along with Bob Van Dillen, Jennifer Westhoven, Melissa Knowles, and Mike Galanos.

She wrote a book titled Morning Sunshine!: How to Radiate Confidence and Feel It Too. It was released on September 10, 2009. She has referred to it as a "non-fiction / motivational / inspirational / how-to / autobiographical book." It debuted at No. 12 on the "Advice, How-To, and Miscellaneous" section of the New York Times Best Seller list.

In 2011, Meade was the moderator on the Oprah Winfrey Network show Ask Oprah's All Stars with Dr. Phil McGraw, Suze Orman and Dr. Mehmet Oz.

On June 21, 2011, Meade released a country music album titled Brand New Day. A single, "Dirty Laundry," was released to country radio. Meade was featured on the cover of the January/February 2011 issue of Making Music magazine and in an article about her experiences with recreational music. Meade sang the "Star Spangled Banner" as part of the NASCAR Sprint Cup pre-race activities for the 2010 Toyota/Save Mart 350, the 2012 Coke Zero 400 and the 2013 Coca-Cola 600 on Memorial Day Weekend.

On December 1, 2022, Meade and the entire HLN Atlanta team were laid off as part of CNN President Chris Licht's restructuring of the network. Meade's timeslot was replaced with a simulcast of CNN This Morning.

== Awards and honors ==
- 1992 Miss Ohio winner
- 1995 regional Emmy Award (covering the 1995 Fox River Grove bus–train collision)
- 2002 Lycos Top 20 most popular TV news personalities In 2004, she was voted "Sexiest Newscaster" by a Playboy.com online poll, with 40% of the vote (16,145 votes over a total of 40,380).
- 2005 Ashland University Young Alumnus Award for her achievements in broadcasting and served as the commencement speaker for the university's 2005 graduation ceremonies.

== Discography ==
=== Studio albums ===
Title	Details	Peak chart positions	
Title	Details	US Country	US Heat
Brand New Day	Release date: June 21, 2011; Label: Warner Music Group	58	24
Count On Me	Release date: June 11, 2013; Label: Warner Music Group	58	29

=== Singles ===
Year	Single	Album
2011	"Dirty Laundry"	Brand New Day
2013	"Get Up"	Count On Me

== Authored books ==
- Meade, Robin (2011). Morning Sunshine!: How to Radiate Confidence and Feel It Too. New York: Center Street. ISBN 9781599951652.

== Personal life ==
Meade married Tim Yeager on November 6, 1993.

On June 6, 2017, Meade revealed that Blake Shelton is a distant cousin.

== See also ==
- New Yorkers in journalism

Awards and achievements
Preceded by Renee Autherson	Miss Ohio; 1992	Succeeded by Titilayo Adedokun
