= Phyllis George =

American businesswoman, actress, and sportscaster (1949–2020)

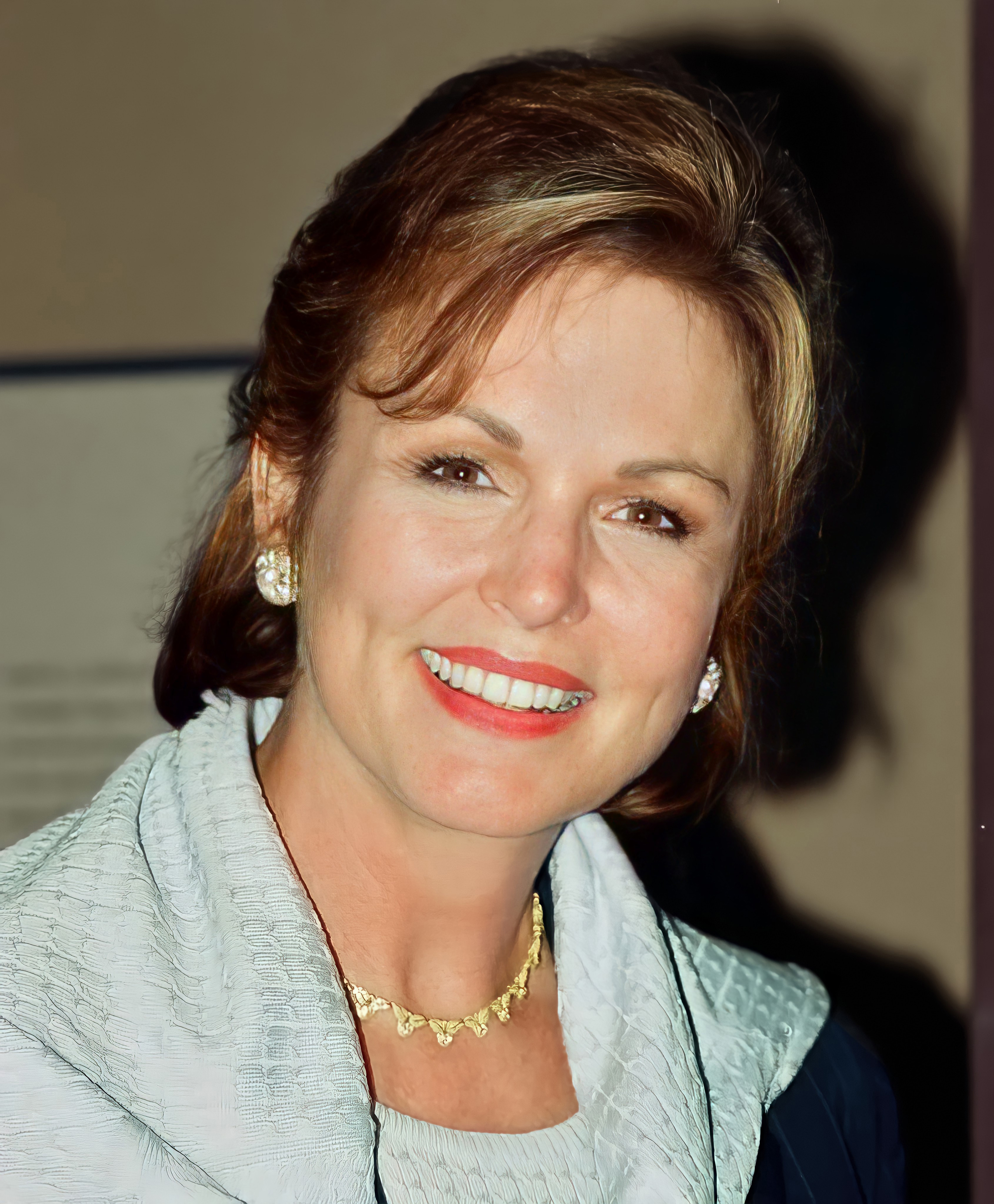
- George in 2000

First Lady of Kentucky
- In office December 11, 1979 – December 13, 1983
- Governor: John Y. Brown Jr.
- Preceded by: Charlann Harting Carroll
- Succeeded by: Bill Collins

Personal details
- Born: Phyllis Ann George; June 25, 1949 Denton, Texas, U.S.
- Died: May 14, 2020 (aged 70) Lexington, Kentucky, U.S.
- Resting place: Lexington Cemetery; Lexington, Kentucky
- Spouses: Robert Evans (m. 1977; div. 1978) John Y. Brown Jr. (m. 1979; div. 1998)
- Children: 2, including Pamela
- Education: University of North Texas; Texas Christian University
- Occupation: Sportscaster, actress
- Known for: Miss America 1971; Miss Texas 1970

Phyllis Ann George (June 25, 1949 – May 14, 2020) was an American businesswoman, actress, and sportscaster. In 1975, George was hired as a reporter and co-host of the CBS Sports pre-show The NFL Today, becoming one of the first women to hold an on-air position in national televised sports broadcasting. She also served as the first lady of Kentucky from 1979 to 1983.

She won Miss Texas in 1970 and was crowned Miss America 1971.

== Early life ==
George was born to Diantha Louise George (née Cogdell; 1919–2003) and James Robert George (1918–1996) in Denton, Texas. She attended North Texas State University (now University of North Texas) for three years until she was crowned Miss Texas in 1970. At that time, Texas Christian University awarded scholarships to Miss Texas honorees. As a result, George left North Texas and enrolled at TCU until winning the Miss America crown later that fall. She was a member of the Zeta Tau Alpha sorority.

== Pageantry ==
George first competed for Miss Texas as Miss Denton in 1969, finishing fourth. The next year she competed as Miss Dallas and was named Miss Texas 1970, then was crowned Miss America 1971 on September 12, 1970. The Women's Liberation Front demonstrated at the event.

In August 1971, George traveled to Vietnam with Miss Iowa Cheryl Browne; Miss Nevada 1970 Vicky Jo Todd; Miss New Jersey 1970 Hela Yungst; Miss Arizona 1970 Karen Shields; Miss Arkansas 1970 Donna Connelly; and George's replacement after she was crowned Miss America Miss Texas 1970 Belinda Myrick. They participated in a 22-day United Service Organizations tour for American troops there. During her year-long stint as Miss America, George appeared on numerous talk shows, including three interviews on The Tonight Show Starring Johnny Carson.

== Career ==
George's television career began in 1974 as a co-host on the comedy show Candid Camera.

=== CBS Sports ===
CBS Sports producers approached George to become a sportscaster in 1974. The following year, she joined the cast of The NFL Today, co-hosting live pregame shows before National Football League games. She was one of the first women to have a nationally prominent role in television sports coverage. As a former beauty queen with a limited television background, she was criticized for not possessing the traditional qualifications for a sportscaster. After three seasons on The NFL Today, she was replaced by another beauty queen, Jayne Kennedy. George returned to the show in 1980 and remained until 1984. She became known for her interviews with athletes. Hannah Storm, an anchor at ESPN's SportsCenter, called George "a true trailblazer" for being an inspirational role model for women who wanted to pursue careers in sportscasting. She also worked on horse racing events, including the Preakness Stakes and the Belmont Stakes.

=== Peanuts ===
George introduced the animated film Happy Birthday, Charlie Brown on CBS TV and was name-dropped in the 1977–1978 series of the Peanuts newspaper cartoon strip.

=== CBS Morning News ===
In 1985, CBS settled on Phyllis George to serve as a permanent anchor for its morning news program. George was given a three-year contract following a two-week trial run. As co-anchor, she interviewed newsmakers including then–First Lady Nancy Reagan.

A low point of her eight-month stint on The CBS Morning News happened when George embarrassed herself during a May 1985 interview with Gary Dotson and Cathleen Webb. Dotson just had been freed after six years in prison on a rape charge after Webb recanted her claim that he was the assailant, admitting to making the accusation after discovering she had become pregnant through consensual sex with her boyfriend, fearful that her foster parents would kick her out of their home. Both appeared on the CBS program as part of (as George later told Tom Shales of The Washington Post) a Webb-Dotson press tour "charade." Both were on or had appeared on NBC News and ABC News as well as other media outlets. As the segment began to wrap, George first suggested the two shake hands. After a brief hesitation from them and no hand shake, George then proposed they "hug it out." A brief moment of awkwardness followed but no hug. The invitation to embrace was deemed highly inappropriate prompting a few phone calls from irate CBS viewers. George also was criticized in the press.

According to news reports at the time, George had been brought in to boost the ratings of the perennial third place ranked program. CBS News staffers were mystified as to why someone with little to no journalism experience was picked over a more qualified candidate from the CBS News roster of reporters and anchors. George had been a talent for the sports division, but had not worked in news. However, this experiment failed to work out, and George was ousted just a few months later. Maria Shriver, then a CBS News employee, took her place as part of another revamp of the program.

=== Other television ===
George had a brief stint on a television news version of People magazine in 1978, and a job as a morning television talk show host as co-anchor of the CBS Morning News in 1985. She also hosted her own prime-time talk show on The Nashville Network, 1994's A Phyllis George Special, on which she interviewed then-President Bill Clinton, and a 1998 talk show titled Women's Day on the cable network PAX. George also appeared as a guest on The Muppet Show in 1979.

=== Business interests ===
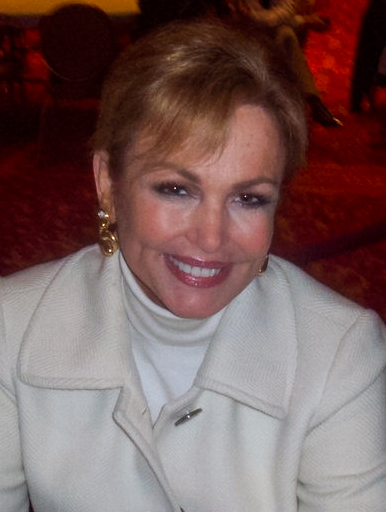
George signing autographs at the Miss America 2008 pageant

George founded two companies in the course of her business career, the first of which was "Chicken by George" chicken fillets. In 1988 after operating for only two years, George sold the company to Hormel Foods, which agreed to operate it as a separate division. In 1991, George received the "Celebrity Women Business Owner of the Year" from the National Association of Women Business Owners.

She also wrote or co-authored five books—three about crafts, one on dieting (her first book, The I Love America Diet, published in 1982), and the final one published during her lifetime, Never Say Never (2002).

George was the founder of the Kentucky Museum of Art and Craft, and was an avid folk and traditional arts collector. She was also a founding member of the Henry Clay Center for Statesmanship.

George resurfaced in 2000 when she played a minor character in Meet the Parents. It was one of her very few film roles.

== Personal life and death ==
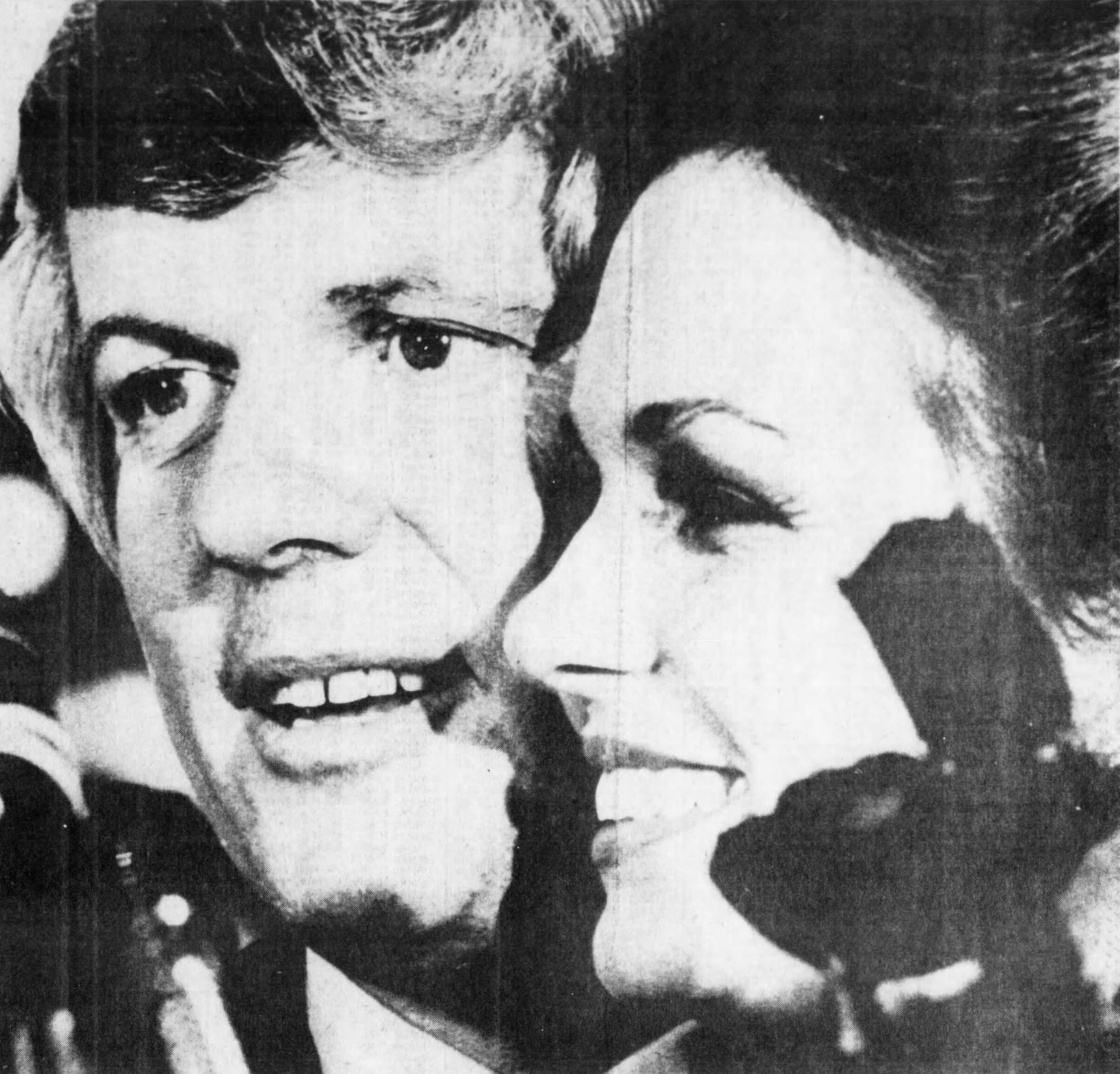
George with her then-husband John Y. Brown Jr. circa 1981

George was married twice. Her first marriage was to Hollywood producer Robert Evans (wed in 1977 and divorced in 1978), and her second to Kentucky Fried Chicken owner and governor of Kentucky John Y. Brown Jr (wed in 1979 and divorced in 1998). George served as Kentucky's First Lady during Brown's term in office. During her marriage to Brown, she had two children, Lincoln Tyler George Brown and Pamela Ashley Brown. Pamela, also a journalist, has served in various anchor and correspondent positions at CNN since joining the network in 2013.

She is quoted as saying, "Life is what you make it. My old expression is, `If you snooze, you lose; if you snore, you lose more".

George died of complications from polycythemia vera, a rare blood cancer, on May 14, 2020, aged 70, at the Albert B. Chandler Hospital in Lexington, Kentucky.

Awards and achievements
Preceded by Pamela Eldred	Miss America; 1971	Succeeded by Laurel Schaefer
Preceded by Dana Dowell	Miss Texas; 1970	Succeeded by Belinda Myrick
Honorary titles
Preceded by Charlann Harting Carroll	First Lady of Kentucky; 1979–1983	Succeeded by Dr. Bill Collins
Media offices
Preceded by Gary Collins & Mary Ann Mobley	Miss America host 1989-1990 (co-host with Gary Collins)	Succeeded by Regis Philbin and Kathie Lee Gifford
