= Miss America's Outstanding Teen 2007 =

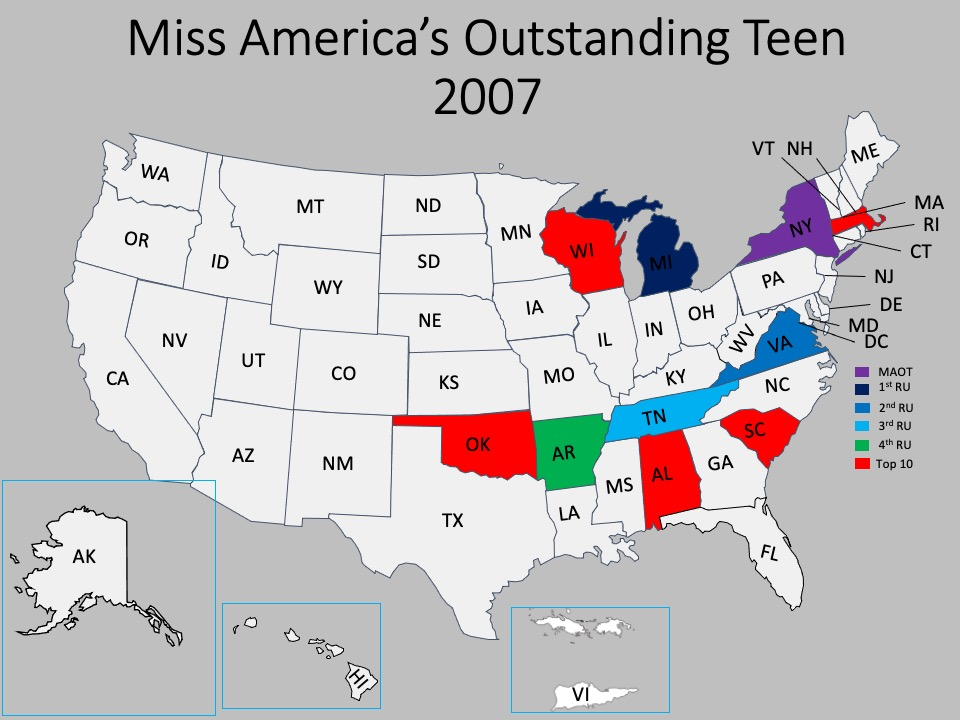
- Miss America's Outstanding Teen 2007 Participants and Results
- Date: August 19, 2006
- Presenters: Joey Fatone; Jennifer Berry
- Venue: Linda Chapin Theater, Orlando, Florida, United States
- Entrants: 52
- Placements: 10
- Winner: Maria DeSantis; New York

Miss America's Outstanding Teen 2007 was the second Miss America's Outstanding Teen pageant, held at the Linda Chapin Theater in the Orange County Convention Center in Orlando, Florida, on August 19, 2006.

At the conclusion of the event, Meghan Miller of Texas crowned her successor Maria DeSantis of New York. The pageant was hosted by Miss America 2006 Jennifer Berry and N'SYNC singer Joey Fatone. The program was televised on The N, a branch of MTV Networks.

== Results ==
=== Placements ===
Placement	Contestant
Miss America's Outstanding Teen 2007	New York – Maria DeSantis
1st Runner-Up	Michigan – Nina Davuluri
2nd Runner-Up	Virginia – Brittany Young
3rd Runner-Up	Tennessee – Leah Beth Bolton
4th Runner-Up	Arkansas – Dorothy Shepard
Top 10	Alabama – Abby Steverson; Massachusetts – Cherise Marie LeClerc; Oklahoma – Molly Colvard; South Carolina – Maggie Hill; Wisconsin – Allie Rick

=== Awards ===
==== Preliminary awards ====
Award	Contestants
Preliminary Evening Wear/On-Stage Question (OSQ)	Arkansas – Dorothy Shepard; Michigan – Nina Davuluri; Texas – Kendall Morris
Preliminary Lifestyle and Fitness	Arkansas – Dorothy Shepard; Tennessee – Leah Beth Bolton; Texas – Kendall Morris
Preliminary Talent	New York – Maria DeSantis; South Carolina – Maggie Hill

=== Other awards ===
Award	Contestant(s)
Academic Achievement	Minnesota – Natalie Davis
Academic Scholarship	Iowa – Erica Lester
Non-finalist Evening Wear/OSQ	Georgia – Lauren Edmonds
Non-finalist Talent	Pennsylvania – Tawni Darby
Overall Interview	Louisiana – Jeremeka Bradley
Spirit of America	Louisiana – Jeremeka Bradley

== Pageant organization ==
=== Selection of contestants ===
One delegate from each state, as well as the District of Columbia and the Virgin Islands, were chosen in local pageants held from September 2005 to July 2006.

=== Preliminary competitions ===
During the 3 days prior to the final night, the delegates compete in the preliminary competition, which include private interview with the judges and a show where they compete in talent, evening wear, lifestyle and fitness in athletic wear, and on-stage question. They were held August 16–18, 2006.

=== Final night of competition ===
During the finals, the top 10 contestants competed in lifestyle and fitness in athletic wear, talent, and evening gown, and the top 5 completed on-stage questions.

== Contestants ==
The Miss America's Outstanding Teen 2007 contestants were:

State	Name	Hometown	Age	Local Title	Talent	Placement	Awards	Notes
Alabama	Abby Lynn Steverson	Smiths Station			Piano, "Maple Leaf Rag"	Top 10		
Alaska	Kaela Larson	Willow	15	At-Large	Vocal			Previously America's National Jr. Sweetheart 2005
Arizona	Brittany Mazur	Tucson	16	At-Large	Vocal, "Adagio"			Contestant on season 10 of American Idol Top 5 at National Sweetheart 2012 pageant
Arkansas	Dorothy Shepard	Pine Bluff	17	Miss Teen South Arkansas	Tap Dance, "Hot Chocolate!"	4th runner-up		
California	Summer Clark	Elk Grove	16	Miss Teen Elk Grove	Drums, "Turn the Beat Around"			
Colorado	Kelsi Johnston	Pueblo West	16		Piano/Vocal, "Someone Like You"			
Connecticut	Melanie Sanches	Prospect	16		Character Tap Dance			Former NFL cheerleader for the New England Patriots
Delaware	Lauren Gagliardino	Bear	16	Miss New Castle County's Outstanding Teen	Tap Dance			
(Washington, D.C.) District of Columbia	Elizabeth Ann Payne	Washington, D.C.			Operatic Vocal			
Florida	Sydney Keister	Jacksonville	17	Miss Jacksonville's Outstanding Teen	Lyrical Jazz Dance, Disney's "Fantasmic"			4th runner-up at Miss Florida 2013 pageant
(Georgia (U.S. state)) Georgia	Lauren Edmonds	Americus		Miss Heart of Georgia's Outstanding Teen	Ballet en Pointe, "I Run for Life"		Non-finalist Evening Wear/OSQ Award	1st runner-up at Miss Georgia 2008 and 2013 pageants 3rd runner-up at Miss Georgia 2012 pageant Contestant at National Sweetheart 2008 pageant
Hawaii	Katrina Kem	Wahiawa	16		Piano/Vocal, "Imagine"			
Idaho	Genevieve Nutting	Boise	17	At-Large	Classical Piano			Later Miss Idaho 2011
Illinois	Campbell Hunt	Marion		Miss John A. Logan's Outstanding Teen	Vocal, "God Help the Outcasts"			
Indiana	Leanna Ross	New Carlisle	17	Miss Hoosier Heartland's Outstanding Teen	Dance/Baton			
Iowa	Erica Lester	Muscatine		Miss Scott County's Outstanding Teen	Lyrical Jazz Dance		Academic Scholarship Award	
Kansas	Erica Mahan	Neosho Rapids	17	Miss Capital City's Outstanding Teen	Flute, "Can Can"			
Kentucky	Alison Lovely	Sayerville	16	Miss Belle of the Bluegrass' Outstanding Teen	Vocal, "Blue Moon of Kentucky"			
Louisiana	Jeremeka Bradley	Bossier City	16	Miss Bossier City's Outstanding Teen	Vocal		Overall Interview Award Spirit of America Award	
Maine	Mallory Lavole	Madawaska	16		Piano			
Maryland	Hannah Mollerick	Jessup		Miss Howard County's Outstanding Teen	Jazz en Pointe			Contestant at National Sweetheart 2010 pageant Later 4th runner-up at Miss Maryland 2010, 2011, and 2013 Later Top 10 at Miss Maryland 2012
Massachusetts	Cherise Marie Leclerc	Hampden			Harp	Top 10		Later 4th runner-up at Miss Massachusetts 2008
Michigan	Nina Davuluri	St. Joseph	16	Miss Southwest Michigan's Outstanding Teen	Modern Classical Indian Dance	1st runner-up	Preliminary Evening Wear/OSQ Award	Later Miss New York 2013; Crowned Miss America 2014
Minnesota	Natalie Davis	Dassel			Vocal		Academic Achievement Award	Contestant at National Sweetheart 2009 pageant Later Miss Minnesota 2011
Mississippi	Kasey Wilder	Pontotoc		Miss Pontotoc's Outstanding Teen	Vocal, "New York State of Mind"			
Missouri	Melanie Collier	Kirksville		Miss Kirksville's Outstanding Teen	Lyrical Jazz Dance			
Montana	Holly Matz	Missoula	16		Jump Rope Routine			Later 1st runner-up at Miss Montana 2009
Nebraska	Sharla Schreiber	Columbus	16		Jazz/Flag			
Nevada	Jordan Bowler	Mesquite			Freestyle Taekwondo Routine, "Feel the Beat"			
New Hampshire	Janine Mitchell	Derry	17		Lyrical Jazz Dance, "Man in the Mirror"			
New Jersey	Lindsey Petrosh	Egg Harbor City	17		Vocal			Later Miss New Jersey 2012
New Mexico	Ellen Striepeke	Silver City			Tap Dance			
(New York (state)) New York	Maria DeSantis	Staten Island	17	Miss Staten Island's Outstanding Teen	Classical Vocal	Winner	Preliminary Talent Award	3rd runner-up at Miss New York 2012 pageant Top 10 at National Sweetheart 2012 pageant
North Carolina	Ciara Newman	Hendersonville		Miss Hendersonville's Outstanding Teen	Lyrical Dance			
North Dakota	Rachel Douts	Powers Lake			Vocal, "One Moment in Time"			
Ohio	Kelsey Ballew	Chillicothe	16		Vocal			
Oklahoma	Molly Colvard	Elm Grove	16	Miss Oklahoma City University's Outstanding Teen	Vocal	Top 10		Sister of Chelsea Colvard, Miss Oklahoma Teen USA 2009
Oregon	Kylee Willard	Grants Pass	17	Miss Josephine County's Outstanding Teen	Latin/Jazz Dance to a Mix of "Represent Cuba/Do You Only Wanna Dance?"			
Pennsylvania	Tawni Darby	Hermitage	15	Miss Moraine State's Outstanding Teen	Lyrical Dance		Non-finalist Talent Award	Founder of Miss America's Outstanding Teen Teens in Training Camp
Rhode Island	Lindsay Rogers	Lincoln	17		Vocal			
South Carolina	Maggie Hill	Gilbert	17	Miss Lexington Teen	Classical Vocal, "Think of Me" from Phantom of the Opera	Top 10	Preliminary Talent Award	
South Dakota	Aja Kessler	Rapid City	17		Ballet en Pointe, "Dance of the Sugar Plum Fairy"			Older half-sister of Miss South Dakota's Outstanding Teen 2013, Nina Mesteth 2nd runner-up at Miss South Dakota 2009 pageant Contestant at National Sweetheart 2009 pageant
Tennessee	Leah Beth Bolton	Jackson			Tap Dance	3rd runner-up	Preliminary Lifestyle & Fitness Award	2nd runner-up at the Miss Tennessee Teen USA 2008 pageant
Texas	Kendall Morris	Ennis	15	Miss Teen Southlake	Classical Piano, "Chopsticks"		Preliminary Evening Wear/OSQ Award Preliminary Lifestyle & Fitness Award	Later Miss Texas 2011; Top 10 at Miss America 2012 pageant
Utah	Tasha Smedley	Syracuse			Modern Lyrical Dance			Later Miss Utah Teen USA 2009; Top 15 at Miss Teen USA 2009 pageant NFL cheerleader for the Dallas Cowboys in 2016 to 2018
Vermont	Heather Bartlett	Jericho			Classical Vocal, "Laughing Song"			
Virginia	Brittany Young	Mechanicsville	17		Classical Vocal	2nd runner-up		Daughter of Miss Virginia 1982, Beverly Cooke 4th runner-up at Miss Virginia 2011 pageant
(United States Virgin Islands) Virgin Islands	Esconica Veira	Saint Thomas			Hip Hop Dance			Later represented the Virgin Islands at the Miss World 2011 pageant and placed in the Top 15 4th runner-up at Miss Supranational 2013 pageant Represented the Virgin Islands at Miss Earth 2014 pageant Later Miss US Virgin Islands 2017
(Washington (state)) Washington	Stefanie Range	Auburn	13	Miss Lakeland Hills' Outstanding Teen	Vocal, "Shy"			
West Virginia	Kaitlin Gates	Bridgeport	14	Miss Teen Appalachia	Vocal			2nd runner-up at Miss West Virginia Teen USA 2008 pageant Later Miss West Virginia 2012
Wisconsin	Allie Rick	Greendale	15	At-Large	Lyrical Dance, "Here Comes the Sun"	Top 10		
Wyoming	Codie Lee Ann Murphy	Sheridan	17	Miss Sheridan's Outstanding Teen	Japanese Fan Dance			
