= Miss New Jersey's Teen =

Miss New Jersey's Outstanding Teen
- Formation: 2005
- Type: Beauty pageant
- Location: Clayton, New Jersey, U.S.
- Members: Miss America's Outstanding Teen
- Official language: English
- Key people: Susan Nicolle
- Website: Official website

The Miss New Jersey's Teen competition is the pageant that selects the representative for the U.S. state of New Jersey in the Miss America's Teen pageant.

Natalie Troyer-Kulstad of Ridgewood was crowned Miss New Jersey's Teen on June 20, 2026, at the Ocean City Music Pier in Ocean City, New Jersey. She competed for the title of Miss America's Teen 2027 on September 5, 2026, at the Kravis Center for the Performing Arts in West Palm Beach, Florida.

== Results summary ==
The year in parentheses indicates the year of the Miss America's Outstanding Teen competition the award/placement was garnered.

=== Placements ===
- 1st runners-up: Brenna Weick (2010)
- 3rd runners-up: Abigail Mignucci (2025), Delaney Higgins (2026)
- Top 7: Alaina Murphy (2019)
- Top 8: Alyssa Sullivan (2013)
- Top 10: Natalie Ragazzo (2012), Shereen Pimentel (2016), Brynn McKinney (2020)
- Top 15: Katie Berry (2006), Andie Babusik (2011)

=== Awards ===
==== Preliminary awards ====
- Preliminary Evening Wear/On Stage Question: Brenna Weick (2010)
- Preliminary Talent: Shereen Pimentel (2016), Delaney Higgins (2026)
- Preliminary Fitness: Delaney Higgins (2026)

==== Non-finalist awards ====
- Non-finalist Interview: Samantha Rizzuto (2015)

==== Other awards ====
- Outstanding Achievement in Academic Life Award: Samantha Rizzuto (2015)
- Outstanding Vocal Talent Award: Shereen Pimentel (2016)
- People's Choice Award: Natalie Ragazzo (2012)
- Teens in Action Award: Samantha Rizzuto (2015)
- Teens in Action Award Finalists: Nina Mojares (2017)
- Teens in Action 2nd runner-up: Natalie Troyer-Kulstad (2027)

== Winners ==
- Declared as Winner
- Ended as a runner-up
- Ended as a finalist or semi-finalist

Year	Name	Hometown	Age	Local Title	Talent	Placement at MAO Teen	Special scholarships at MAO Teen	Notes
2026	Natalie Troyer-Kulstad	Ridgewood	17	Miss Bergen County’s Teen	Vocal		Teens in Action 2nd runner-up	
2025	Delaney Higgins	Long Valley	17	Miss South Jersey's Teen	Baton Twirling	3rd Runner-Up	Preliminary Fitness Award Preliminary Talent Award	
2024	Abigail Mignucci	Magnolia	18	Miss South Jersey's Teen	Vocal	3rd Runner-Up		
2023	Ashley Greco	Waldwick		Miss Cape Shores' Teen				
2022	Maria Lynn Sooy	Ocean View	15	Miss Stars and Stripes' Outstanding Teen	Irish Dance			
2020–21 (Note: State competition took place in 2020, as national pageant postponed to 2021 for the 2022 edition due to the COVID-19 pandemic.)	Isabella Freund	Ocean View	17	Miss Seashore Line's Outstanding Teen	Piano, "Moonlight Sonata"			Later Miss Eastern Shore 2023
2019	Brynn McKinney	Sewell	15	Miss South Shores' Outstanding Teen	Vocal, "Don't Rain on My Parade" from Funny Girl	Top 10		
2018	Alaina Murphy	Carneys Point	15	Miss Atlantic Shores’ Outstanding Teen	Vocal, "Finding Neverland"	Top 7		
2017	Augostina Mallous	Cape May Court House	15	Miss Atlantic Shores’ Outstanding Teen	Acrobatic Jazz Dance, "Hit Me With a Hot Note"			Later Miss New Jersey 2022
2016	Nina Mojares	Freehold	16	Miss Monmouth County’s Outstanding Teen	Vocal		Teens in Action Award Finalist	
2015	Shereen Pimentel	Teaneck	17	Miss Cape Shores' Outstanding Teen	Vocal, "Finding Wonderland"	Top 10	Outstanding Vocal Talent Award Preliminary Talent Award	Expected to appear as Maria in 2019 Broadway revival of West Side Story
2014	Samantha Rizzuto	Long Valley	17		Vocal		Non-finalist Interview Award Outstanding Achievement in Academic Life Award Teens in Action Award	
2013	Alyssa Sullivan	Cape May Court House	17	Miss South Shore Area's Outstanding Teen	Vocal, "Gimme, Gimme" from Thoroughly Modern Millie	Top 8		Later Miss New Jersey 2021
2012	Amanda Ross	Galloway	16	Miss South Shore Area's Outstanding Teen	Ballet en Pointe			3rd runner-up at Miss New Jersey 2016 pageant 2nd runner-up at Miss New Jersey 2017 pageant
2011	Natalie Ragazzo	Pennington	15		Vocal	Top 10	People's Choice Award	4th runner-up at Miss New Jersey 2017 pageant 3rd runner-up at Miss New Jersey 2019 competition 3rd runner-up at Miss New York 2021
2010	Andie Babusik	Gloucester County	14	Miss Atlantic Shore's Outstanding Teen	Ballet en Pointe			
2009	Brenna Weick	Mantua Township	15	Miss Coastal Shore's Outstanding Teen	Vocal	1st runner-up	Preliminary Evening Wear/OSQ Award	Top 10 at National Sweetheart 2013 pageant Later Miss New Jersey 2016
2008	Katharyn Nicolle	Wenonah	16		Ballet en Pointe			Later Miss New Jersey 2011
2007	Kaitlyn Schoeffel	Egg Harbor Township	13	Miss Coastal Shore's Outstanding Teen	Dance			Later Miss New Jersey 2017; 2nd runner-up at Miss America 2018
2006	Lindsey Petrosh	Egg Harbor City	17		Vocal			Later Miss New Jersey 2012
2005	Katie Berry	Mount Laurel	16		Ballet en Pointe	Top 15		Contestant at National Sweetheart 2011 pageant 4th runner-up at Miss New Jersey 2009 pageant 2nd runner-up at Miss New Jersey 2010 and 2011 pageants 1st runner-up to Mallory Hagan at Miss New York 2012 pageant
