= Cheryl Browne =

American ballet dancer

- Born: Cheryl Adrienne Browne
- Education: Luther College
- Known for: First African American contestant, Miss America 1971 pageant.
- Title: Miss Iowa 1970
- Spouse: Karl Hollingworth
- Children: 2

Cheryl Adrienne Browne Hollingsworth, Miss Iowa 1970, is an American former ballet dancer and beauty pageant titleholder. She is known as the first African American contestant in the history of the Miss America pageant (Miss America 1971) following the abolition of the pageant's rule number seven, instituted during the 1930s, which read: "contestants must be of good health and of the white race".

In 2000, Cheryl Browne Hollingsworth lived in Lithonia, Georgia, with her husband Karl. Both work in the financial industry and have two grown children.

== Early life, Miss Iowa 1970, and Miss America 1971 ==
"Iowans were very accepting of me, but I think it took the country by surprise to realize that it was a young woman from Iowa who became the first African-American contestant. I don't feel I personally changed the pageant. but I feel that my presence expanded people's minds and their acceptance. And, in subsequent years, they were much more open to African-American candidates [...] I didn't feel hounded by the press, but it was obvious that security was tight —especially at Convention Hall rehearsals when our chaperones weren't always present. There were women's lib protesters on the Boardwalk, and no one knew whether there would be more protesters because of the African-American connection."

— Cheryl Browne on the reaction to her involvement in the Miss America pageant

Browne's father, Carl, was born in the West Indies and worked as a narcotics policeman for Kennedy Airport's Port Authority. Her mother Mercedes, who is half Native American, managed a tuberculosis clinic at Triboro Hospital. Cheryl grew up in Jamaica, Queens New York with her three brothers. She studied dance for 16 years prior to the Miss America pageant.

Browne left New York to attend the Lutheran - based Luther College in Decorah, Iowa at the advice of her minister. She stated in an interview that it was her first venture to the midwest. While she was an undergraduate there, Browne entered and won the local 1970 Miss Decorah Pageant which enabled her to compete in the Miss Iowa pageant held on June 13, 1970. Browne placed first in the swimsuit competition and performed an original ballet performance for the talent competition to the music of 'Scheherazade.' She beat the other 19 (white) contestants to win the title of Miss Iowa 1970. This win generated a strong response (some in support and some critical) to newspapers, the Miss Iowa pageant board, and to Browne herself. The criticisms ranged from her ethnic background to the fact that a non-native Iowan won the crown. According to The Register-Guard, Browne, herself, was "surprised that Iowa, with its conservative traditions, silent majority, and small black population (1 percent of the state's 1970 population of 2,800,000) was the first state to pick a black girl as its representative."

This backlash followed her to the Miss America 1971 pageant held on September 12, 1970. Browne drew attention from reporters and from security personnel in Atlantic City who maintained a visible presence during pageant rehearsals. In addition, the Women's Liberation Front demonstrated at the event. Brown was not a finalist, however, losing to Miss Texas 1970, Phyllis George. In August 1971, Browne traveled to Vietnam with George, Miss Nevada 1970, Vicky Jo Todd, Miss New Jersey 1970, Hela Yungst, Miss Arizona 1970, Karen Shields, Miss Arkansas 1970, Donna Connelly, and Miss Texas 1970 (George's replacement), Belinda Myrick. They participated in a 22-day United Service Organizations tour for American troops that began in Saigon. Browne later commented that she thought "it was one of the last Miss America groups to go to Vietnam."

Browne graduated from Luther College in 1972.

== Photographs ==
- Photographs taken at the MISS AMERICA U.S.O. SHOW to Vietnam in 1971
- It Happened Here in New Jersey - Contains photograph of Cheryl Browne in the preliminaries prior to the Miss America 1971 pageant on September 8, 1970.

Awards and achievements
Preceded by Lois Koth	Miss Iowa; 1970	Succeeded by Judith Stephens
