= Hela Yungst =

Television entertainer and beauty pageant winner

Hela Yungst Hochman
- Born: Hela Yungst; January 15, 1950; Tel Aviv, Israel
- Died: February 24, 2002 (aged 52); Mountainside, New Jersey, U.S.
- Spouse: Peter Hochman
- Children: 1
- Beauty pageant titleholder
- Title: Miss New Jersey 1970
- Major competition: Miss America 1971

Hela Yungst Hochman (January 15, 1950 - February 24, 2002), also known as Hela Young, was an American television entertainer and beauty pageant winner. She was a promoter of Holocaust awareness and a former president of the New Jersey Commission on Holocaust Education.

Yungst was born in Tel Aviv, Israel, to Eva (née Faiman) and Henry; both were survivors of The Holocaust. The family moved to the Newark, New Jersey area about 1956. She was raised in Hillside, New Jersey and graduated from Hillside High School in 1967, where she was a member of the National Honor Society. She completed a BA (music education and theatre) at Newark State College (now Kean University).

Yungst was Miss New Jersey 1970, representing the state in the Miss America 1971 pageant in Atlantic City. The Women's Liberation Front demonstrated at the event. Yungst was not a finalist, however, losing to Miss Texas 1970, Phyllis George. In August 1971, Yungst traveled to Vietnam with George; Miss Nevada 1970, Vicky Jo Todd; Miss New Jersey 1970, Cheryl Browne; Miss Iowa 1970, Karen Shields; Miss Arkansas 1970, Donna Connelly; and Miss Texas 1970 (George's replacement), Belinda Myrick. They participated in a 22-day USO tour for American troops there. The tour began in Saigon. Browne later commented that she thought "it was one of the last Miss America groups to go to Vietnam."

Yungst was a performer on stage and in films, television commercials and soap operas, appearing in Guiding Light and All My Children. She changed her name to Hela Young and became the New Jersey Lottery hostess in January 1977 on NJN drawing the nightly winning numbers. She left television in November 2001 due to illness.

She resided with her husband and daughter in Mountainside, New Jersey and died in 2002 due to cancer.

The New Jersey Commission on Holocaust Education presents "The Hela Young Award" each year "to honor a person in recognition of outstanding work in the community for the improvement of human relations among diverse peoples and for the improvement of the human condition."

Awards and achievements
Preceded by Cheryl Carter	Miss New Jersey; 1970	Succeeded by Lynn Hackerman
