= New Jersey Commission on Holocaust Education =

Government agency of the U.S. state of New Jersey

Agency overview
- Formed: 1991
- Preceding agency: New Jersey Holocaust Council
- Jurisdiction: New Jersey
- Headquarters: P.O. Box 500 Trenton, NJ 08625
- Agency executive: Phil Kirschner
- Parent agency: New Jersey Department of Education
- Website: http://www.state.nj.us/education/holocaust/

The New Jersey Commission on Holocaust Education is a government agency of the U.S. state of New Jersey. Its core mission is to promote Holocaust education throughout the state by surveying, designing, encouraging and promoting Holocaust and genocide education and awareness. It also provides programs and coordinates events to memorialize The Holocaust and provides curriculum Guides on a variety of Topics

The Commission presents "The Hela Young Award" each year "to honor a person in recognition of outstanding work in the community for the improvement of human relations among diverse peoples and for the improvement of the human condition." The award is named for Hela Yungst, a former television entertainer and beauty pageant winner, and past president of the Commission. In 2016 Paul B.Winkler died. He had been the executive director of the New Jersey Commission on Holocaust Education since 1975.

== Curriculum Guides Examples ==
- K-4 Holocaust/Genocide Curriculum Guide Caring Makes a Difference
- 5-8 Holocaust/Genocide Curriculum Guide To Honor All Children
- 9-12 Holocaust/Genocide Curriculum Guide The Holocaust and Genocide:The Betrayal of Humanity
- The Cambodian Curriculum
