= Gary Dotson =

American man exonerated of a criminal conviction by DNA evidence

- Born: March 8, 1957 (age 69)
- Children: 1

Gary E. Dotson (born March 8, 1957) is an American man who was the second person to be exonerated of a criminal conviction by DNA evidence (after David Vasquez was given an unconditional pardon on the 4th of January 1989, for the 1984 murder of Carolyn Hamm). In May 1979, Dotson was found guilty and sentenced to 25 to 50 years' imprisonment for rape, and another 25 to 50 years for aggravated kidnapping, the terms to be served concurrently. This conviction was upheld by the appellate court in 1981. In 1985, the accusing witness recanted her testimony, which had been the main evidence against Dotson. He was not exonerated or pardoned at that time, but due to popular belief that he was a victim of a false rape accusation, Dotson went through a series of paroles and re-incarcerations until DNA evidence proved his innocence in 1988. Dotson was subsequently cleared of his conviction.

== Personal background ==
Gary E. Dotson was a high-school dropout who, at the time of his arrest, was living in Country Club Hills, a modest Chicago suburb, with his mother Barbara and his sisters Debbie, Gail and Laura. After conviction in 1979, the next eight years of his life were spent in prison; another four were spent on legal proceedings which led to charges being dropped in 1988 and a full pardon in 2002.

After his first release from prison in 1985, Dotson married Camille Dardanes, a woman who had come to know him during the hearings following his conviction. In March 1986, under difficult financial circumstances, the couple moved in with Dotson's mother. In January, 1987, they had a daughter, Ashley. Near the end of 1987, Dardanes requested a divorce. She filed the formal paperwork in April 1989.

Dotson's first wife, Camille Dorothy Dardanes, was reported missing in Las Vegas in 1994, but the report was destroyed three months later. A new report was made in 2003. Dardandes was last seen in the vicinity of the 300 block of south Casino Center Boulevard in Las Vegas during May 1994. She had told friends that she was afraid, but did not give the reason for her fears.

== Alleged crime ==
At the time, sixteen-year-old Cathleen Crowell Webb made up a rape allegation to explain to her foster parents her pregnancy concerns so she could obtain contraception after having had consensual sex with her boyfriend the previous day. After her 1985 recantation, she described herself as an "emotionally disturbed" foster child and revealed that she had been sexually active since the age of 12. Crowell later admitted her fabrication was based on a scene from a 1974 best-selling bodice ripper romance novel, Sweet Savage Love.

The hoax began the night of July 9, 1977, when a police officer happened upon her standing beside a road not far from the shopping mall in the Chicago suburb of Homewood, where she lived and where she worked in a Long John Silver's seafood restaurant. Her clothing was dirt-stained and in disarray.

Crowell tearfully told the officer that, as she walked across the mall parking lot after work, a car with three young men in it ran towards her. Two of the men jumped out, grabbed her, and threw her into the backseat. One of them climbed in beside her, and the other joined the driver in the front. The man in the back tore her clothes, raped her, and scratched several letters onto her stomach with a broken beer bottle.

Crowell was taken to South Suburban Hospital, where a rape examination was performed. She identified Gary Dotson, according to her, under pressure from police based on the resemblance of his mug shot in the mug book to the composite sketch of an assailant she described. Even though there was no sign on Dotson of the scratches Crowell claimed she inflicted on her assailant and, unlike the smooth-shaven assailant Crowell described, Dotson had a mature mustache, he was arrested.

== Recantation ==
By 1981, Crowell Webb had become deeply religious. In 1982, Crowell married a high school classmate, David Webb, and they moved to New Hampshire. In 1985 she confessed to her pastor what she had done, but when she tried with his assistance to correct what she had done the prosecutors would not take action. Dotson sought post-judgment relief based on Crowell Webb's recantation, but the trial court found her recantation to be unbelievable and refused to free him.

The lawyer next contacted the media (leading to the infamous "How about a hug?" moment during the CBS Morning News from anchor Phyllis George). The resulting public sympathy caused the original trial judge Richard L. Samuels to release Dotson on $100,000 bond pending a hearing one week later. At that hearing, Judge Samuels rejected new evidence discrediting the forensic evidence given at the trial, called the recantation less credible than the original testimony and sent Dotson back to prison.

Dotson's attorney also petitioned the Governor of Illinois, James R. Thompson, for clemency on April 19. "Big Jim" Thompson, formerly a federal prosecutor, responded to the media attention by declaring that he personally would oversee three days of public hearings on Crowell Webb's recantation. The hearings lasted three days, from May 10 through May 12, 1985. Twenty-four witnesses were called to testify at the just-opened new State of Illinois Center in Chicago which Thompson had built, and which is now named after him. The sexually graphic proceedings were televised, creating a nationwide crime drama at a time when cameras in the courtroom were unheard of. Viewers were shocked when a "gigantic" projection of Crowell Webb's stained underwear was projected onto a massive screen on the wall, and when she and her boyfriend recited details of their sexual activity. Nearly a quarter-century later, the Thompson Dotson hearings were still described as "circuslike," a description widely used in 1985.

== Exoneration ==
On August 15, 1988, Governor Thompson and the prosecutors were notified that DNA testing had positively excluded Dotson and positively included Crowell's then-boyfriend, David Bierne, as the source of the semen stain. Nevertheless, the governor stated he would not act without receiving a recommendation from the Prisoner Review Board, which then failed to consider it. The media took up Dotson's case. In May 1989, his lawyer filed a new petition for post-conviction relief, which was accepted for hearing on August 14, 1989. The prosecutors publicly vowed to oppose the petition but later joined the judge in dismissing the original conviction and dropping all charges at the August 14 hearing.

Dotson was officially pardoned by Illinois Governor George Ryan in 2002.

== Aftermath ==
In 1985 Crowell co-wrote a book about the incident called Forgive Me and gave Dotson more than $17,000 in proceeds from its sale, keeping nothing for herself except the taxes due on that payment. In return, Dotson promised not to sue her over her false accusation. Dotson used the money to finance the start of his post-prison life, including a trip to Las Vegas to marry Dardanes. In 1985, Dotson had planned to write his own book with New York City author Jeannie Ralston. If written, the book was not published. By April 1989, Dardanes filed for separation. By fall of 1989, Dotson was working part-time as a construction worker in Illinois and was hoping to register for college classes to become a counselor. Dotson underwent treatment for alcoholism after his release.

After their 1989 divorce, Dardanes and their daughter moved to Las Vegas, near Dardanes' mother, Barbara Kritzalis.

By the time Dotson was cleared in 1989, Dotson's accuser Cathleen Crowell Webb had four children and had permanently made her home in New Hampshire, where her husband then worked as a welder and ironworker. Crowell died of breast cancer on May 15, 2008, six years after diagnosis. She had been working part-time as a receptionist at a religious grammar school and as a helper at a local golf course. After her death, her husband David told the press how she felt about recanting:

Once she got saved [in 1981] and came to terms with what she had done to Gary's life, she made the decision to come forward. She had two young children, and she had no idea of how intense an experience it was going to be, but she fully expected to pay more of a price than she actually did. There was a good chance that she might have had to go to jail. She couldn't give Gary back his years, but at that point she did everything she could to make it right.

At the time of Crowell Webb's death in 2008, Dotson was reported to be "living quietly in the far south suburbs of Chicago" and "wanting to stay under the radar now, wanting to put this behind him."
