= Alicia Luciano =

American beauty queen

- Born: Alicia Luciano; 1983 (age 42–43); Stanhope, New Jersey, U.S.
- Beauty pageant titleholder
- Title: Miss New Jersey 2002
- Major competition: Miss America 2003

Alicia Luciano (born 1983) held the title of Miss New Jersey 2002 and competed in the Miss America 2003 Pageant held on September 21, 2002, in Atlantic City, New Jersey.

Luciano graduated from Lenape Valley Regional High School in 2001.

== Miss New Jersey ==
She won the Miss New Jersey title as Miss Tri-County. It was her first try for the title. At the time of Miss America, she was a 19-year-old student at Wagner College studying Arts Administration. Her platform was breast cancer awareness, which she chose because her grandmother died from the disease. Her talent was lyrical dance. She was a dance instructor, assistant choreographer, and accounting assistant at the time of her reign. At the Miss America 2003 pageant, she won the Preliminary Presence and Poise in Evening Wear Award and the Overall Elegance and Lifestyle Award. A bit of controversy occurred when she was asked if she thought that the show The Sopranos was a disservice to the state of New Jersey during the preliminary competition of the Miss America 2003 pageant. Critics thought that it was in bad taste due to her Italian heritage.

== Life after Miss New Jersey ==
She was a member of the Radio City Rockettes. She was fourth runner-up to Miss New Jersey USA 2007, though the original winner eventually resigned. She was a judge for the Miss New Jersey 2010 pageant.

Preceded by Julie Barber	Miss New Jersey; 2002	Succeeded by Jennifer Farrell
