= Richard L. Samuels =

American judge

Richard L. Samuels (August 13, 1926 – April 14, 2001, in Flossmoor) was a Cook County Circuit judge at the Sixth Municipal District Courthouse in Markham, Illinois, for nearly 30 years. His most (in)famous Case was the high profiled rape case against Gary Dotson during the 1970s and 1980s. Dotson is the first American man who was to be exonerated of a criminal conviction by DNA evidence.

Samuels ordered Dotson back to prison, after the putative victim, Cathleen Mae Webb, of the alleged 1977 rape, recanted. Later Samuels upheld Dotson's conviction, because he thought her original testimony was more credible than her recantation.

Richard L. Samuels retired in December 2000. Due to cancer, he died 4 months later, at the Age of 74, on April 14, 2001, in the Advocate South Suburban Hospital in Hazel Crest. He is buried at the Ridgewood Cemetery in Des Plaines.
