= New Jersey Department of Education =

New Jersey state agency

- Seal of the NJDOE

Agency overview
- Formed: July 1, 1945; 81 years ago
- Preceding agencies: State Board of Regents; State Board of Education; Department of Public Instruction; Office of the Commissioner of Education
- Jurisdiction: Government of New Jersey
- Headquarters: Judge Robert L. Carter Building 100 River View Plaza, Trenton, New Jersey
- Annual budget: US$22.9 billion (FY2027)
- Agency executive: Dr. Lily Laux, Commissioner
- Child agencies: New Jersey Commission on Holocaust Education; New Jersey Latino and Hispanic Heritage Commission; New Jersey Amistad Commission; New Jersey Italian & Italian American Heritage Commission; Marie H. Katzenbach School for the Deaf
- Website: https://www.nj.gov/education/

The New Jersey Department of Education (NJDOE) administers state and federal aid programs affecting more than 1.4 million public and non-public elementary and secondary school children in the state of New Jersey. The department is headquartered in the Judge Robert L. Carter Building in Trenton.

== Responsibilities ==
The department is responsible for ensuring that local schools comply with state and federal laws and regulations. It also oversees pupil transportation services and directs education programs for adults and for persons who are handicapped, disadvantaged or foreign-born.

The department employs over 900 persons and had an appropriation of $59.2 million from the state budget in fiscal 2004–05. The budget provided for $25.5 million for education grants-in-aid and $8.9 billion for state aid to education. It also appropriated to educational institutions an anticipated $821.4 million in federal funds.

The department's agencies include the State Board of Education, the School Ethics Commission and the State Board of Examiners. It is headed by the Commissioner of Education. On January 19, 2010 Bret Schundler was named the Acting Commissioner, and confirmed by the State Senate on March 11, 2010. After New Jersey was eliminated from the federal Race to the Top funding program, Schundler was removed by Governor Chris Christie and Assistant Commissioner Rochelle Hendricks was named Acting Commissioner. On January 18, 2011, Chris Cerf was sworn in as Acting Commissioner.

The Department of Education publishes the New Jersey School Report Card as part of an effort to increase school- and district-level accountability for educational progress by providing relevant data to the public that can be used to monitor and measure the performance of schools. While the format and contents of the reports have changed over time, the New Jersey School Report Card has offered the public information about each and every New Jersey school since 1995 when the Legislature enacted the reporting requirement.

The department administers assessment tests to public school students to monitor academic progress. These used to be the New Jersey Assessment of Skills and Knowledge (NJASK) for students in grades 3–7; the Grade Eight Proficiency Assessment (GEPA) for eighth grade; and the High School Proficiency Assessment (HSPA) in eleventh grade. All tests were replaced with the PARCC assessment; however, the PARCC has been replaced by the NJSLA assessment since 2019.

== Department of Education Offices ==
The department is headquartered in the Judge Robert L. Carter Building, which has most of the DOE offices, in Trenton; other facilities in Trenton with DOE offices include 1001 Spruce Street and the Mary Roebling Building, which has the facilities division on the 14th Floor, at 20 W. State Street.

== Office of the Commissioner ==
The former Commissioner was Dr. Lamont Repollet, who was confirmed by the New Jersey Senate on June 19, 2018, after serving as Acting Commissioner from January 29, 2018. The Commissioner of Education maintains the role of chief executive school officer of New Jersey. The commissioner acts as a supervisor over all New Jersey public schools. Additionally, the Commissioner of Education holds a seat in the Governor's cabinet, which is only possible after appointment by the Governor himself with the guidance and approval of the New Jersey State Senate. The main roles of the commissioner include legislative suggestions and initiatives for improving the public schools, which must be approved by the state board. Also, the commissioner acts as a mediator between local school districts and federal government. As of January 2024, Kevin Dehmer was nominated by the Governor to be the new commissioner of the New Jersey Department of Education.

== Department of Education Programs ==
=== Bilingual/ESL Education ===
The NJ Department of Education provides various resources for bilingual speakers and English as a second language speakers. On the website for the NJ DOE, links for professional development opportunities are listed, as well as resources like family engagement programs and testing opportunities.

=== Charter schools ===
A charter school is a public school that functions as its own Local Education Agency (LEA) if allowed a charter by the Commissioner of Education. The ability to approve a charter school program lies with the Commissioner of Education due to the Charter School Program Act of 1995. The New Jersey Department of Education is the only institution with the authority to sanction charter schools. In order to open a charter school, one must fill out an application, which can be found on the NJ DOE website.

=== Anti-Bullying ===
The New Jersey Department of Education has implemented several programs to ensure that effective policies are in place to prevent and address harassment, intimidation, and bullying in NJ schools. Resources for schools as well as resources for parents are readily available on the NJ DOE website. The website also provides more information about Alcohol, Tobacco, and Other Drug Abuse, Suicide Prevention, Codes of Student Conduct, Gangs, Dropouts, Unsafe School Choice Option Policy, and much more. All of this information is geared towards informed NJ residents of the resources offered to students in case of bullying.

=== Special education ===
The New Jersey Department of Education supports a special education office that is in charge of overseeing that the federal requirements of the Individuals with Disabilities Education Act of 2004 is enforced in local education agencies, inclusive of all school districts. Special education opportunities are afforded to children with various learning disabilities such as autism, dyslexia, and other reading disabilities.

== Teachers ==
In 2010, a New Jersey Star-Ledger study of teacher salaries showed the average pay for N.J. teachers was $63,154; the median salary was $57,467 annually. The salaries were the fourth highest in the country. Administrators salaries were larger than teachers' salaries, with 235 of them making more than the governor's $175,000 salary. In 2009, new retirees pensions averaged $46,000 annually.

== Related legislation ==
- 1945: Act of March 26, 1945, P.L. 1945, c. 51
- 1950: Act of June 26, 1950, P.L. 1950, c. 254

== See also ==
- List of school districts in New Jersey
- List of high schools in New Jersey
- Abbott districts

== Sources ==
- Fitzgerald's Legislative Manual State of New Jersey 2005 (Skinder-Strauss Associates; Newark, New Jersey)
- 2004 New Jersey Legislative District Data Book (Rutgers University Center for Government Studies)
