= High School Proficiency Assessment =

Standardized test in New Jersey, United States

The High School Proficiency Assessment (HSPA, pronounced "hess-pah" (/ˈhɛspə/) or sometimes just "H-S-P-A") was a standardized test that was administered by the New Jersey Department of Education to all New Jersey public high school students in March of their junior year until 2014-2015 when it was replaced by the PARCC. Together with the New Jersey Assessment of Skills and Knowledge (NJ ASK), which was administered in grades 3–8, the HSPA was part of a battery of tests used to assess student performance in New Jersey's public schools.

== Assessment ==
The HSPA was administered over a course of three days simultaneously in all public high schools throughout the state of New Jersey. The exam tests students' proficiency in a variety of academic subjects including mathematics and language arts literacy. Beginning on September 1, 2001, state law in New Jersey required that all students pass the HSPA for high school graduation.

Students who did not pass the exam on their first try were given two opportunities to retake it during their senior (and final) year. Additionally, for those who were still unable to pass the exam or felt that they were "not good test-takers," the state department of education gave students the option of participating in a "Special Review Assessment" process (SRA) to demonstrate their academic abilities.

== History ==
The exam, first administered in 1989, was originally called the High School Proficiency Test (abbreviated as HSPT) and was taken during the freshman year. If the examination was failed, it could be taken each year until it was passed. In 1993, only students who were in eleventh grade (Grade 11) were allowed to take the exam, and thus in 2001 the name was changed to HSPT-11 to reflect that policy alteration.

Students with severe disabilities who were unable to participate in the standardized assessment tests were given an Alternate Proficiency Assessment (APA). An APA was a portfolio-based assessment method used to measure academic progress. The APA was given to a student in each content area where the student's disability was so severe that the student was not receiving instruction in the skill being measured and the student could not complete any of the types of questions on the assessment in a content area even with appropriate changes and accommodations.
