= Miss America 1971 =

50th Miss America pageant

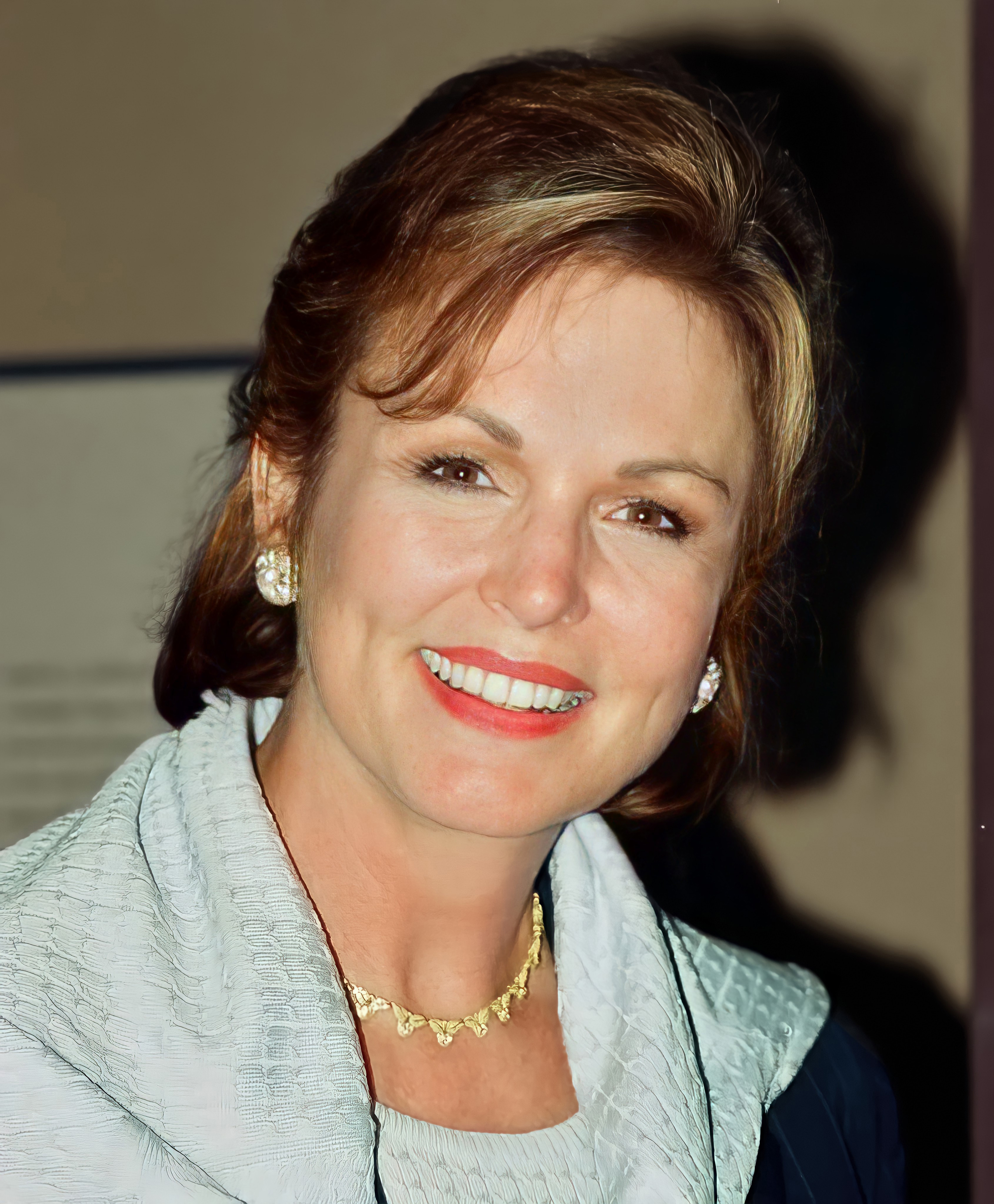
- Phyllis George, 2018
- Date: September 12, 1970
- Presenters: Bert Parks
- Venue: Boardwalk Hall, Atlantic City, New Jersey
- Broadcaster: NBC
- Winner: Phyllis George †; Texas

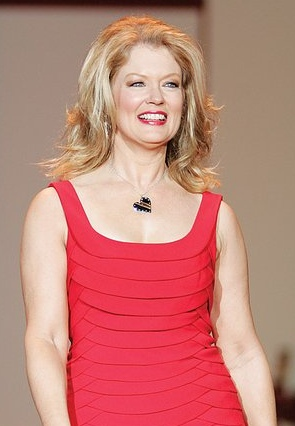
Mary Harum (Mary Hart), Miss South Dakota 1970

Miss America 1971, the 44th Miss America pageant, was held at the Boardwalk Hall in Atlantic City, New Jersey on September 12, 1970. The Women's Liberation Front demonstrated at the event and Miss Iowa 1970, Cheryl Browne, was the first African American contestant in the history of the Miss America pageant. Miss South Dakota 1970 Mary Harum (Mary Hart) and Miss New Jersey 1970 Hela Yungst would both become media personalities.

Miss Texas 1970, Phyllis George, was crowned Miss America 1971. George would later become a noted media personality, featured on the CBS football program The NFL Today, as well as the First Lady of Kentucky from 1979 to 1983.

In August 1971, George traveled to Vietnam with Miss Nevada 1970, Vicky Jo Todd, Miss New Jersey 1970, Hela Yungst, Miss Arizona 1970, Karen Shields, Miss Arkansas 1970, Donna Connelly, Miss Iowa 1970, Cheryl Browne, and Miss Texas 1970 (George's replacement after she became Miss America), Belinda Myrick. They were participating in a 22-day United Service Organizations tour for American troops there. The tour began in Saigon. Browne later commented that she thought "it was one of the last Miss America groups to go to Vietnam."

== Results ==
=== Placements ===
Placement	Contestant
Miss America 1971	Texas – Phyllis George †
1st Runner-Up	South Carolina – Claudia Carmen Turner †
2nd Runner-Up	Maine – Karen Johnson
3rd Runner-Up	Mississippi – Christine McClamroch
4th Runner-Up	Pennsylvania – Maggie Walker
Top 10	Arkansas – Donna Connelly; Florida – Lisa Donovan; New York – Katherine Karlsrud; Oklahoma – Judy Adams; South Dakota – Mary Harum

=== Top 10 ===
1. Florida
2. Maine
3. Texas
4. South Dakota
5. New York
6. Mississippi
7. Pennsylvania
8. South Carolina
9. Oklahoma
10. Arkansas

=== Top 5 ===
1. Maine
2. Mississippi
3. Pennsylvania
4. South Carolina
5. Texas

=== Awards ===
==== Preliminary awards ====
Awards	Contestant
Lifestyle and Fitness	Texas - Phyllis George; South Carolina - Claudia Turner; Hawaii - Kathleen P. O'Sullivan
Talent	Florida - Lisa Donovan; Oklahoma - Judy Adams; Alabama - Suzanne Dennie

==== Other awards ====
Awards	Contestant
Miss Congeniality	Indiana - Debbie May
Neat as a Pin Award	Alaska - Virginia Walker
Non-finalist Talent	California - Karin Kascher; Indiana - Debbie Sue May; Iowa - Cheryl Adrienne Browne; Minnesota - Juliana Genevieve Gabor; Nevada - Vicky Jo Todd; North Carolina - Cornelia Collette Lerner; Rhode Island - Teresa Louise Bradley; Utah - Deborah Dunn

== Judges ==
- Hal David†
- Dr. Zelma George
- Bud Westmore†
- Robert F. Lewine
- Joan Crosby
- Edward Loeb
- Maria Gamarelli Fenton
- Norton Mockridge†
- Dr. W. Hugh Moomaw

== Contestants ==
State	Name	Hometown	Age	Talent	Placement	Award	Notes
Alabama	Suzanne Dennie	Birmingham	20	Popular Vocal, "Alfie"		Preliminary Talent Award	
Alaska	Virginia Walker	Kotzebue	19	Original Poem, "My Wonderland"		Special Judges' Award Neat as a Pin Award	First Miss America contestant from the Arctic Circle
Arizona	Karen Shields	Tucson	19	Dance & Vocal Medley from My Fair Lady			
Arkansas	Donna Connelly	Hope	19	Vocal Medley, "Who Will Buy" from Oliver! & "Love is a Many-Splendored Thing"	Top 10		
California	Karin Kascher	Castro Valley	18	Violin, "Méditation"		Non-finalist Talent Award	
Colorado	Sue Gehrman	Fort Collins	18	Musical Interpretation, "Just You Wait" from My Fair Lady			
Connecticut	Cynthia Fowler	Cheshire	21	Classical Vocal, "The Jewel Song" from Faust			
Delaware	Linda Sue Hitchens	Seaford	20	Vocal/Dance, "Give My Regards to Broadway"			
Florida	Lisa Donovan	Sarasota	21	Vocal, "Feeling Good"	Top 10	Preliminary Talent Award	Singer on 1980s game show Face the Music
(Georgia (U.S. state)) Georgia	Nancy Carr	Midland	22	Popular Vocal, "I Wish You Love"			
Hawaii	Kathleen Puanani O'Sullivan	Kailua	18	Modern Dance, "Ritual Fire Dance"		Preliminary Lifestyle & Fitness Award	
Idaho	Noralyn Olsen	Ovid	18	Classical Piano, "Etude Op. 10, No. 5"			
Illinois	Lynn Alexander	Loami	18	Classical Vocal, "Vissi d'arte"			
Indiana	Debbie May	Remington	21	Semi-classical Vocal, "The Impossible Dream"		Non-finalist Talent Award; Miss Congeniality	
Iowa	Cheryl Browne	Decorah	20	Ballet, "Deep Purple"		Non-finalist Talent Award	First African American contestant to compete at Miss America Cheryl Adrienne Browne was a native of Jamaica, Queens, New York City, New York who attended Luther College in Decorah, Iowa.
Kansas	Linda Susan Edds	Manhattan	21	Popular Vocal, "The Windmills of Your Mind"			
Kentucky	Cynthia Anne Bostick	Owensboro	18	Vocal, "Life is a One Way Street"			Appeared as Marcia Campbell on As the World Turns Cynthia Anne Bostick Georgeson died at age 70 on January 24, 2023, in Racine, Wisconsin.
Louisiana	Carol Almand	Haynesville	18	Vocal, "The Wedding"			
Maine	Karen Johanna Johnson	Cumberland Foreside	20	Classical Vocal, "Quando me'n vo'"	2nd runner-up		
Maryland	Sharon Anne Cannon	Salisbury	21	Piano, "Elephant Walk"			
Massachusetts	Diana Dohrmann	Boston	21	Piano, "The Kid from Red Bank" by Count Basie			
Michigan	Ginger Myers	Lincoln Park	21	Vocal, "Wicked Man"			
Minnesota	Juliana Gabor	South St. Paul	20	Popular Vocal, "My Coloring Book"			
Mississippi	Christine McClamroch	Columbus	21	Vocal Medley, "Cabaret", "Try to Remember", & "You'll Never Walk Alone"	3rd runner-up		
Missouri	Marcia Mossbarger	Brookfield	22	Tap Dance, "Raindrops Keep Fallin' on My Head"			
Montana	Jane Opp	Billings	20	Piano, Le Cavalier Fantastique by Paul Ben-Haim			
Nebraska	Debra May Sullivan	Omaha	19	Acrobatic Dance, "Fly Me to the Moon"			
Nevada	Vicky Jo Todd	Sparks	20	Vocal/Guitar, "Time"		Non-finalist Talent Award	
New Hampshire	Deborah Ann Merrill	Portsmouth	19	Vocal/Dance, "I Want to be Happy" & "Happiness Is"			
New Jersey	Hela Yungst	Hillside	20	Dramatic Vocal, "Aldonza" from Man of La Mancha			
New Mexico	Janis Jones	Raton	21	Soft Shoe Dance, "Golden Slippers"			
(New York (state)) New York	Katherine Karlsrud	Mamaroneck	18	Harp, "Whirlwind" by Carlos Salzedo	Top 10	Dr. David B. Allman Medical Scholarship	First Allman Scholarship recipient to graduate from Medical School
North Carolina	Cornelia Lerner	Asheville	18	Piano, "Revolutionary Étude" by Chopin		Non-finalist Talent Award	
North Dakota	Nancy Tangen	Northwood	19	Classical Vocal, "Pace pace mio dio" from La forza del destino			
Ohio	Grace Bird	Alliance	21	French Horn & Classical Vocal, "1st Concerto for French Horn" & "Ouvre ton Coeur" from Vasco da Gama by Georges Bizet			
Oklahoma	Judy Adams	Cushing	20	Violin, "The Hot Canary" arranged by Florian ZaBach	Top 10	Preliminary Talent Award	
Oregon	Cynthia Lynn Harrison	Portland	18	Vocal & Guitar, "Just Once"			
Pennsylvania	Maggie Walker	Harrisburg	18	Gymnastic Ballet on Uneven Parallel Bars, "Contessa"	4th runner-up		
Rhode Island	Teresa Bradley	East Greenwich	19	Folk Singing & Guitar, "Chelsea Morning"		Non-finalist Talent Award	
South Carolina	Claudia Carmen Turner†	Spartanburg	19	Vocal, "Once Upon a Time"	1st runner-up	Preliminary Lifestyle & Fitness Award	Claudia Carmen Turner Wells Bauman, died at 69 on September 24, 2021, in South Carolina.
South Dakota	Mary Harum	Sioux Falls	19	Vocal Medley, "You've Made Me so Very Happy", "Something", & "Yesterday"	Top 10		Former co-host of Entertainment Tonight
Tennessee	Carol Ferrante	Memphis	21	Vocal			
Texas	Phyllis George†	Denton	21	Piano Medley, "Promises, Promises" & "Raindrops Keep Fallin' on My Head"	Winner	Preliminary Lifestyle & Fitness Award	One of the first women sportscasters on network television as co-host of NFL Today on CBS from 1975 to 1977 and 1980 to 1983 Co-host of the 1989 & 1990 Miss America pageants with Gary Collins
Utah	Deborah Melba Dunn	Salt Lake City	20	Modern Dance, "Julia"			
Vermont	Pati Papineau	Rutland	19	Classical Ballet, "The Stars and Stripes Forever"			
Virginia	Jeannette Smith	Roanoke	19	Classical Piano, "Toccata" by Aram Khachaturian			
(Washington (state)) Washington	Nancy Peterson	Moses Lake	19	Original Comedy Monologue, "Once Upon a Leaf"			
West Virginia	Linda Dianne Barnett	Parkersburg	19	Modern Jazz Dance, "The Electric Indian"			
Wisconsin	Linda Jane Johnson	Milwaukee	19	Piano, "Polonaise"			
Wyoming	Jane Hutchings	Cheyenne	19	Piano, "Arabesque" by Claude Debussy			

== Photographs ==
- It Happened Here in New Jersey - Contains photograph of Miss Iowa Cheryl Browne and Miss Maryland Sharon Ann Cannon in the period before the Miss America Pageant 1971 on September 8, 1970.
- Photographs taken at the MISS AMERICA U.S.O. SHOW to Vietnam in 1971
