= Cathleen Mae Webb =

American author

- Born: Cathleen Mae Crowell; June 26, 1961; Illinois, U.S.
- Died: May 15, 2008 (aged 46); Harrisville, New Hampshire, U.S.
- Children: 4

Cathleen Mae Webb (also known as Cathleen Crowell Webb) was an Illinois woman who accused a man, Gary Dotson, of kidnapping and raping her in 1977. Dotson was convicted in 1979 and sentenced to prison. In 1985, Webb recanted her testimony, after which Dotson was released and exonerated in the first case involving DNA evidence.

== Allegation ==
In 1977, Webb, then known as Cathleen Crowell, was 16 and living with her foster parents in Homewood, Illinois. On July 9, on her way home from her part-time job at a Long John Silver's, she claimed to have been abducted by three men in a car, one of whom raped her. Later, after contacting police, she identified a suspect from a composite sketch and a mug shot. Gary Dotson was soon arrested as a suspect after matching her description. In a 1979 trial, her testimony, along with scientific evidence by a forensic serology expert (later found to have fraudulent credentials), was used to convict Dotson, who was sentenced to a 25–50 year prison term for kidnapping and rape.

== Recantation ==
In 1985, Webb was married and living in Jaffrey, New Hampshire, where she became active in the Baptist church. After confessing to her pastor, she decided to recant her earlier testimony against Dotson. Securing a lawyer, John McLario, she contacted the Cook County State Attorney's office and admitted to fabricating the charges in 1977 to cover up a possible pregnancy after having consensual sex with her boyfriend, claiming to have panicked at the thought of being thrown out of her foster parents' house.

Webb's recantation was dismissed at first by state prosecutors and the Cook County District Attorney's office. Local interest in the matter surged after McLario contacted the Chicago Tribune and WLS-TV, with sympathy solidly on Webb and Dotson's side. In a hearing held at the Markham Branch Court on April 4, Dotson was released on bond. At a hearing on April 11, however, Judge Richard L. Samuels, faced with confusing evidence, revoked the bond and ordered Dotson back to prison.

McLario and Webb then took their case to the national media. News editors found Webb a photogenic subject, and she attracted nationwide attention after a cover story on the April 21 edition of People. Succumbing to political pressure from the media frenzy and resulting publicity, Illinois Governor James R. Thompson personally presided over Dotson's clemency hearings on May 10, which were televised live at the State of Illinois Center in Chicago. After three days, Thompson commuted Dotson's sentence.

== Aftermath ==
Following the hearings, Webb and Dotson made appearances together on national television; in one such appearance on the CBS Morning News, co-host Phyllis George suggested that the two embrace, outraging critics and the audience alike. Later in 1985, Webb co-authored the book Forgive Me (written with Marie Chapian). In the book, Webb chronicled an extraordinarily troubled childhood. Her mother had suffered from mental illness and was institutionalized, while her father abandoned Webb to the custody of an elderly acquaintance who could not care for her properly. Denied family connection and affection, Webb said she became sexually active at the age of 12. Later, Webb detailed her involvement and interest in the Pilgrim Baptist Church in New Hampshire as well as the bible study that led to her atonement. Webb returned to New Hampshire and avoided interviews and media exposure.

Dotson, who had not been cleared of the original rape charges, had a troubled release from prison, including several parole violations. Webb sent him the advance she received from a book publisher, reportedly $17,500. Finally, in 1988, a new type of DNA testing, the PCR technique, became available; it was successfully used on degraded samples taken from Webb in 1977 and proved that no contact between the two had taken place.

Webb raised four children before dying of breast cancer on May 15, 2008, a month before her 47th birthday.

== Bibliography ==
- Webb, Cathleen Crowell, Forgive Me, ISBN 0-8007-1462-8
