= Julie Robenhymer =

Miss New Jersey 2005

- Born: Julie Anne Robenhymer; February 24, 1981 (age 45); Moorestown Township, New Jersey, U.S.
- Education: University of Massachusetts Amherst
- Height: 5 ft 4 in (1.63 m)
- Beauty pageant titleholder
- Title: Miss New Jersey 2005; Miss Burlington County 2005
- Hair color: Blonde
- Eye color: Blue
- Major competition: Miss America 2006

Julie Anne Robenhymer (born February 24, 1981) is Miss New Jersey 2005, and a blogger for the website hockeybuzz.com.

== Biography ==
Robenhymer won the title of Miss New Jersey in 2005 and participated in Miss America 2006 on January 21, 2006.

Robenhymer is from Moorestown Township, New Jersey, near Philadelphia, and grew up following the Philadelphia Flyers hockey team. She attended the University of Massachusetts Amherst, graduating in 2003 with degrees in journalism and sports management.

On September 21, 2007, Robenhymer was named a blogger for hockeybuzz.com, where she covers college hockey. On March 22, 2013, she was named as a columnist for the biggest ice hockey site in Sweden, hockeysverige.se, where she covers NHL. She also writes articles for the official website of the New Jersey Devils.

Awards and achievements
Preceded by Erica Scanlon	Miss New Jersey; 2005	Succeeded by Georgine DiMaria
