= New Jersey Assessment of Skills and Knowledge =

Phased-out standardized test in U.S.

The New Jersey Assessment of Skills and Knowledge (NJASK) was a standardized test given to all New Jersey public-schooled students in grades 3-8 during (usually) March, April, or May, and was administered by the New Jersey Department of Education.

Together with the High School Proficiency Assessment (HSPA) that was given to students in eleventh grade, the NJASK was part of a battery of tests used to assess student performance in New Jersey's public schools.

The test was originally called the Elementary School Proficiency Assessment (ESPA), which was administered at grade 4 from 1997 through 2002 to provide an early indication of student progress toward achieving the knowledge and skills identified in the New Jersey Core Curriculum Content Standards (CCCS).

In spring 2003, the state education department replaced the ESPA with the NJASK, which is a comprehensive, multi-grade assessment program. It assessed student achievement in language arts, math, and science. Along with other indicators of student progress, the results of the elementary-level assessments were intended to be used to identify students who need additional instructional support in order to reach the CCCS.

Alternate Proficiency Assessment (APA) is a portfolio-based assessment method used to measure academic progress for students with severe disabilities who are unable to participate in the standardized assessment tests. The APA is given to a student in each content area where the student's disability is so severe that the student is not receiving instruction in the skill being measured and the student cannot complete any of the types of questions on the assessment in a content area even with appropriate changes and accommodations.

Beginning in the 2014–2015 school year, the NJASK assessments and the HSPA were phased out in favor of the new PARCC exam, which is administered to students in grades 3–11.

== GEPA ==
The Grade Eight Proficiency Assessment (abbreviated GEPA and pronounced "geh-puh")' was given to all New Jersey public-schooled students in March of their eighth grade year. It is often known as the "preparation test" for the High School Proficiency Assessment (HSPA), which has similar rules and information. Beginning in 2008, the Grade 8 Proficiency test has been changed to New Jersey Assessment of Skills and Knowledge Grade 8 or NJASK8.

Together with the New Jersey Assessment of Skills and Knowledge (NJASK) administered in grades 3-7 and the HSPA (High School Proficiency Assessment) given to students in eleventh grade, the GEPA is part of a battery of tests used to assess student performance in New Jersey's public schools.

It consists of three major parts which are Science, Math, and Language Arts.

The test was first administered in 1991 as the Early Warning Test (EWT). In 1999, it became GEPA.

The highest a student can receive is Advanced Proficient, which is achieved by getting a score of 250 or higher. This is followed by Proficient (achieved by a majority of non-special needs students), anywhere between 200 and 250. Finally, the lowest is Partially Proficient, which is below 200.

Alternate Proficiency Assessment (APA) is a portfolio-based assessment method used to measure academic progress for students with severe disabilities who are unable to participate in the standardized assessment tests. The APA is given to a student in each content area where the student's disability is so severe that the student is not receiving instruction in the skill being measured and the student cannot complete any of the types of questions on the assessment in a content area even with appropriate changes and accommodations.

In 2008, the GEPA was phased out in favor of a new version known as the NJ ASK 8. The new test will include changes from the original version, such as the deletion of the picture prompt.

== Replacement ==
In 2011, New Jersey decided to become a member of the Partnership for Assessment of Readiness for College and Careers (PARCC). The PARCC is a new standardized test taken in the spring that is aimed to improve critical thinking skills and help get test scores quicker in multiple states. PARCC started in Ohio, New York, Colorado, Illinois, Maryland, Massachusetts, New Jersey, and Rhode Island during the 2014-2015 schoolyear. The PARCC is done electronically and it can be done on paper if the school requests. Since PARCC came to New Jersey in 2015, the NJ ASK and HSPA is being phased out in many schools across the state.

== Other names ==
- GEPA (Grade Eight Proficiency Assessment), or NJASK 8
- EWT (Early Warning Test), given to grade 8 students throughout New Jersey
