= Cara McCollum =

American journalist

- Born: February 6, 1992; Forrest City, Arkansas, U.S.
- Died: February 22, 2016 (aged 24); Camden, New Jersey, U.S.
- Education: Princeton University, (B.A. English, 2015); Forrest City High School
- Occupations: Journalist; model
- Title: Miss New Jersey 2013; Miss Island Resort 2013
- Predecessor: Lindsey Petrosh
- Successor: Cierra Kaler-Jones

Cara McCollum (February 6, 1992 – February 22, 2016) was an American journalist and lead news anchor for SNJ Today (which she joined in July 2015). She was Miss New Jersey 2013 and competed for the Miss America 2014 title.

== Background and education ==
The daughter of Rick and Maureen (née Buckingham) McCollum, both of Forrest City, Arkansas, McCollum attended Forrest City High School, where she was named valedictorian. She was also named an Arkansas Times Academic All-Star in 2010.

McCollum entered Princeton University in 2010, and was on the cheerleading squad during her freshman year. She was a journalism student under John McPhee (in his “Creative Nonfiction” course), Evan Thomas, and Alma Guillermoprieto, and was also a member of the sorority Kappa Alpha Theta and University Cottage Club. McCollum received her B.A. in English (with a concentration in journalism) in June 2015, after taking time off to complete her year as Miss New Jersey (2013-2014).

== Miss New Jersey 2013 ==
In early 2013, McCollum won the Miss Island Resort pageant, which allowed her to participate in the Miss New Jersey 2013 competition. In June 2013, she won the title of Miss New Jersey with the platform, "Giving the Gift of Reading." This platform promoted youth literacy through her nonprofit organization "The Birthday Book Project," an organization which gives gift-wrapped books to underprivileged children grades K-5th for their birthdays. McCollum also had a musical talent, as seen in her advanced piano skills (despite a rare bone growth that made one of her fingers immobile), and she went on to perform Calvin Jones’s rendition of "Whitewater Chopped Sticks."

In September 2013, McCollum participated in the Miss America 2014 pageant as Miss New Jersey. For the "Show Us Your Shoes" parade along the Atlantic City Boardwalk, McCollum wore a mermaid costume with flippers and a net banner that read "Washed Ashore and Stronger than the Storm" to honor those affected by Hurricane Sandy.

During her year-long reign as Miss New Jersey, McCollum was named New Jersey Library Association Champion of the Year, as well as a Daily Points of Light Winner for her advocacy of youth literacy. Tracey Hoover, CEO of Points of Light, also highlighted McCollum's non-profit, The Birthday Book Project, in an article that she wrote for The Huffington Post.

== Death ==
On February 15, 2016, McCollum was involved in a car accident. She was taken to Cooper University Hospital in Camden, where she died on February 22, 2016, sixteen days after her 24th birthday.

A funeral was held in her hometown of Forrest City, Arkansas and a memorial service was held in Ocean City, New Jersey. McCollum's longtime boyfriend, News Anchor Keith Jones, delivered the eulogy at both occasions. Jones called their two-year courtship an "encyclopedia of memories." Jones said the pair constantly wrote each other letters. He said, "Thank you for the two of the best years of my life ... may God bless you Cara." McCollum's family said Cara had made the decision to donate her organs.

Awards and achievements
Preceded by Lindsey Petrosh	Miss New Jersey; 2013	Succeeded by Cierra Kaler-Jones
