= Miss Iowa =

Beauty pageant competition

- Formation: 1924
- Type: Scholarship competition/beauty pageant
- Headquarters: Davenport
- Location: Iowa
- Members: Miss America
- Official language: English
- Board of directors: Leslie Moore (Executive Director) Ashley Brown (Secretary / Field Operations) Lisa Durbin (Treasurer / Scholarships Chair) Dapo Kolawole (Sponsorship Chair) Jessica Patel (Judge's Chair) Bill Lee Sandy Koester (Competition Week Contestant Coordinator) Natasha Sottos
- Website: Official website

The Miss Iowa competition is the official preliminary for the state of Iowa in the Miss America Scholarship Competition.

McKenzie Kerry of Des Moines was crowned Miss Iowa 2026 on June 13, 2026, at the Davenport Central Performing Arts Center in Davenport, Iowa. She competed for the title of Miss America 2027 on September 6, 2026, at the Kravis Center for the Performing Arts in West Palm Beach, Florida.

No contestant from Iowa has ever won the national Miss America title; however, two Miss Iowa titleholders have finished as first runners-up.

Cheryl Browne, Miss Iowa 1970, competed in the Miss America 1971 pageant as the first African American contestant.

== Gallery of past titleholders ==
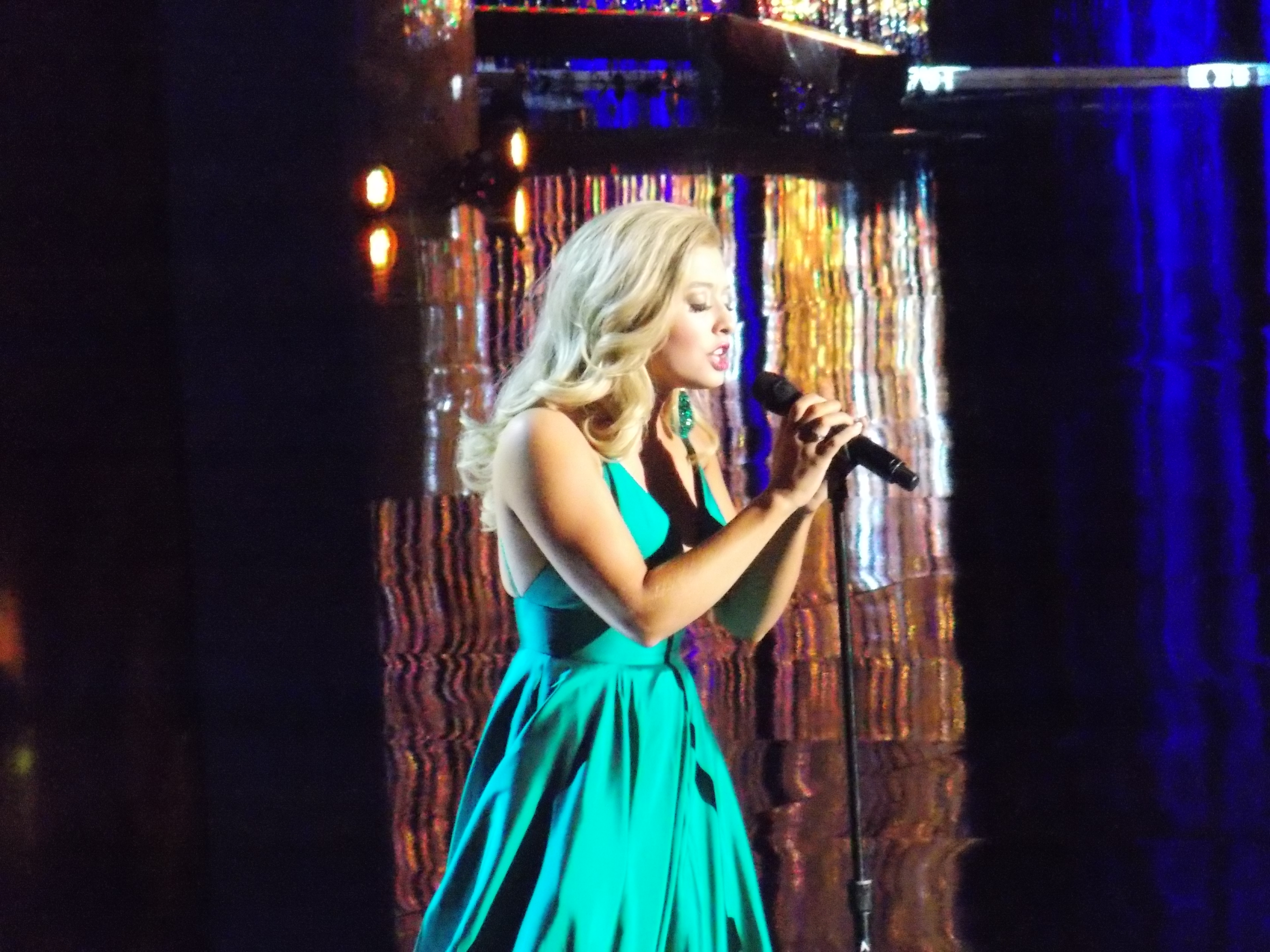
Taylor Wiebers,
Miss Iowa 2015

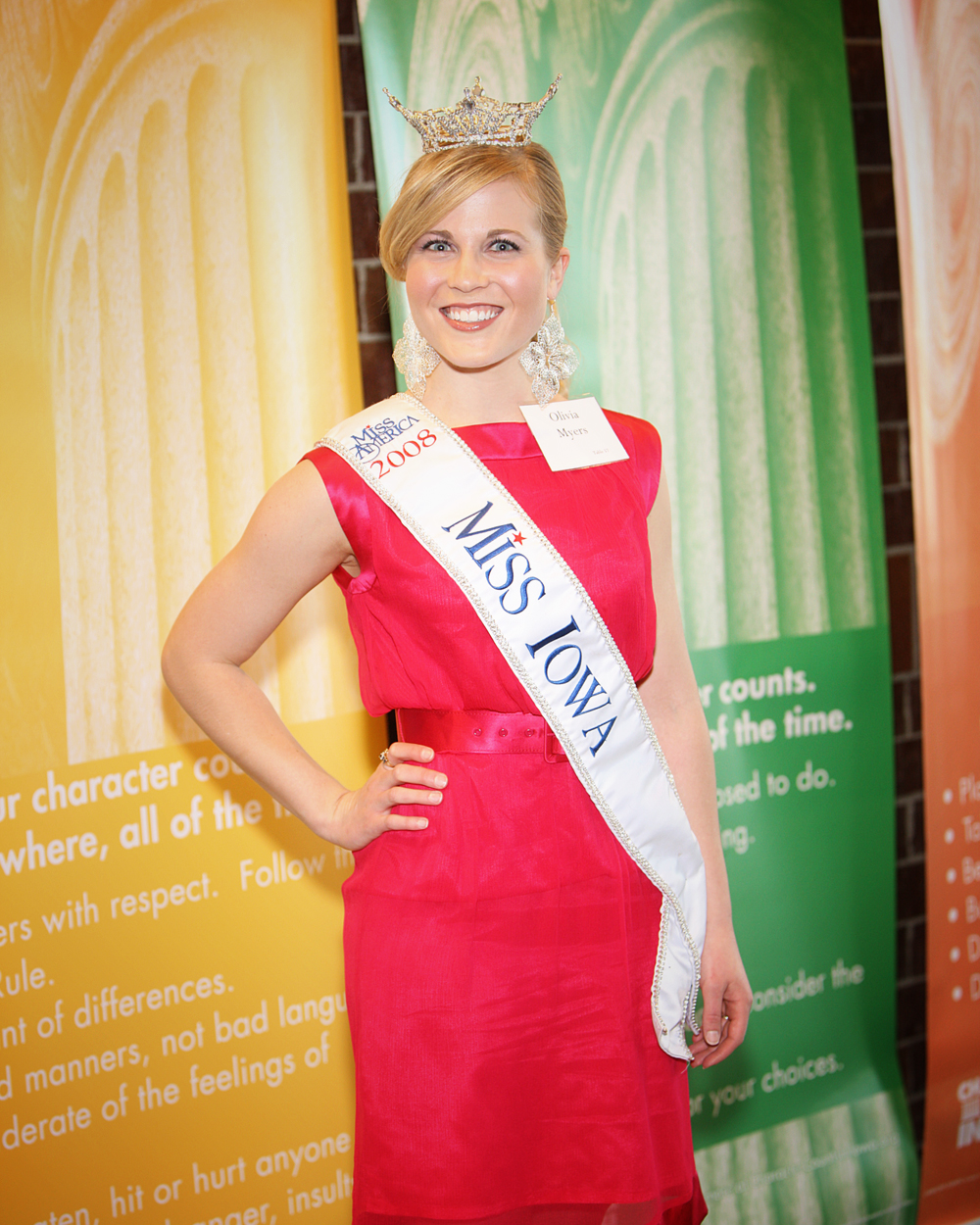
Olivia Myers,
Miss Iowa 2008

== Results summary ==
The following is a visual summary of the past results of Miss Iowa titleholders at the national Miss America pageants/competitions. The year in parentheses indicates the year of the national competition during which a placement and/or award was garnered, not the year attached to the contestant's state title.

=== Placements ===
- 1st runners-up: Joanne MacDonald (1959), Catherine Lemkau (1993)
- 2nd runners-up: Susan Thompson (1969), Olivia Myers (2009)
- 3rd runners-up: Lisa Somodi (1992)
- 4th runners-up: Mariah Cary (2013)
- Top 10: Lynda Jeanne Formanek (1968), Renee Stuedemann (1973), Lori Froeling (1980), Kerri Rosenberg (1991), Diana Reed (2008), Jessica Pray (2012), Kelly Koch (2017)
- Top 11: McKenzie Kerry (2027)
- Top 12: Aly Olson (2015), Taylor Wiebers (2016)

=== Awards ===
==== Preliminary awards ====
- Preliminary Lifestyle & Fitness: Susan Thompson (1969), Catherine Lemkau (1993) (tie), Taylor Wiebers (2016)
- Preliminary Talent: Lisa Somodi (1992), Catherine Lemkau (1993), Diana Reed (2008), Taylor Wiebers (2016)
- Preliminary Social Impact Pitch: Bailey Hodson (2023)
- Preliminary Evening Gown: McKenzie Kerry (2027)

==== Non-finalist awards ====
- Non-finalist Talent: Martha Barsness (1957), Joleen Wolf (1963), Carolyn Northway (1964), Marie Mushro (1966), Lois Koth (1970), Cheryl Browne (1971), Jean Bollhoefer (1975), Darla Blocker (1982), Linda Simon (1983), Robin Wolfram (1987), Jayna Sanchez (1990), Lisa Dondlinger (1999), Jennifer Caudle (2000), Carolyn Nicholas (2005), Anne Langguth (2010), Chelsea Dubczak (2018)
- Non-finalist Interview: Pauli Mayfield (2011)

==== Other awards ====
- Miss Congeniality: Marie Mushro (1966)
- Miss America Scholar Award: Erin Smith (2002)
- Quality of Life Award 1st runners-up: Theresa Uchytil (2001)
- Quality of Life Award 2nd runners-up: Nancy Van Meter (1994)
- Quality of Life Award Finalists: Anne Langguth (2010)

== Winners ==
- Declared as winner
- Ended as a runner-up
- Ended as a finalist or semi-finalist

Year	Name	Hometown	Age	Local Title	Miss America Talent	Placement at Miss America	Special scholarships at Miss America	Notes
2026	McKenzie Kerry	Des Moines	27	Miss Polk County	Vocal	Top 11	Preliminary Evening Gown	Previously Miss Iowa USA 2024: Top 20 & People's Choice Winner at Miss USA 2024
2025	Lydia Fisher	Wapello	22	Miss Tanglewood	Tap Dance			Previously Miss Iowa's Outstanding Teen 2017
2024	Abi Batu-Tiako	Oskaloosa	21	Miss Polk County	Vocal, "The Joke"			
2023	Alysa Goethe	Bettendorf	23	Miss Polk County	Vocal			
2022	Bailey Hodson	Berwick	24	Miss Metro	Vocal, “She Used To Be Mine”		Preliminary Social Impact Pitch Winner	
2021	Grace Lynn Keller	Island Lake, IL	22	Miss Eastern Iowa	Contemporary Dance			Eligible as a student and recent graduate of the University of Iowa
2019–20 (Note: Titleholder extended to a second full year in 2020 after state and national pageants postponed to 2021 due to the COVID-19 pandemic)	Emily Tinsman	Bettendorf	22	Miss Wild Rose	Classical Vocal			Held the title for 2 years due to COVID-19
2018	Mikhayla Hughes-Shaw	Rock Island, IL	21	Miss Clinton County	Violin, "Chrystalize" by Lindsey Stirling			Eligible as a student and recent graduate of the University of Iowa
2017	Chelsea Dubczak	Urbandale	23	Miss Metro	Operatic Vocal, "Sempre Libera" from La traviata		Non-finalist Talent Award	Later Iowa Sweetheart 2019
2016	Kelly Koch	Waukee	20	Miss Polk County	Dance	Top 10		
2015	Taylor Wiebers	Clinton	21	Miss Clinton County	Vocal, "Don't Forget Me" from Smash	Top 12	Preliminary Lifestyle & Fitness Award Preliminary Talent Award	
2014	Aly Olson	Des Moines	21	Miss Scott County	Vocal, "How Could I Ever Know" from The Secret Garden	Top 12		Previously Miss Iowa's Outstanding Teen 2010
2013	Nicole Kelly	Keokuk	23	Miss Metro	Vocal, "Brave" by Sara Bareilles			Born without left forearm
2012	Mariah Cary	Burlington	20	Miss Muscatine	Tap Dance, "Scatman (Ski Ba Bop Ba Dop Bop)"	4th runner-up		
2011	Jessica Pray	Johnston	18	Miss Muscatine	Vocal, "You Raise Me Up"	Top 10		
2010	Pauli Mayfield	Davenport	24	Miss Scott County	Vocal, "I Know Where I've Been" from Hairspray		Non-finalist Interview Award	
2009	Anne Langguth	Iowa City	22	Miss Johnson County	Violin, Zigeunerweisen		Non-finalist Talent Award Quality of Life Award Finalist	Top 10 at National Sweetheart 2008 pageant
2008	Olivia Myers	Sperry	22	Miss Burlington	Tap Dance, "Fever"	2nd runner-up		
2007	Diana Reed	Norwalk	23	Miss Capital City	Baton, "You Can't Stop the Beat" from Hairspray	Top 10	Preliminary Talent Award	
2006	Emily Nicholas	Clear Lake	21	Miss Cedar River	Vocal, "Over the Rainbow"			Sister of Miss Iowa 2004, Carolyn Nicholas
2005	Kay Pauszek	Bettendorf	23	Miss Muscatine	Irish Step Dance, "Tipping Wheel"			
2004	Carolyn Nicholas	Clear Lake	22	Miss Cedar River	Flute, "The Heebie Jeebies"		Non-finalist Talent Award	Sister of Miss Iowa 2006, Emily Nicholas
2003	Nicole White	Eldridge	22	Miss Scott County	Vocal, "If I Had My Way"			
2002	Stephanie Moore	Okoboji	22	Miss Golden Circle	Vocal, "Wishing You Were Somehow Here Again" from The Phantom of the Opera			
2001	Erin Smith	Bettendorf	20	Miss Mississippi Valley Fair	Piano, "Toccata in E-flat minor" by Aram Khachaturian		Miss America Scholar	
2000	Theresa Uchytil	Urbandale	24	Miss Johnson County	Baton, "The Cup of Life"		Quality of Life Award 1st runner-up	
1999	Jennifer Caudle	Davenport	21	Miss Scott County	Cello, "Sabre Dance"		Non-finalist Talent Award	
1998	Lisa Dondlinger	Des Moines	24	Miss Capital City	Violin, "Hoe-Down" from Rodeo		Non-finalist Talent Award	
1997	Sheri Riley	Clear Lake	19	Miss Cedar Valley	Gospel Vocal, "His Eye Is on the Sparrow"			
1996	Natasha Courter	Davenport	23	Miss Mississippi Valley Fair	Tap Dance, "It Don't Mean a Thing (If It Ain't Got That Swing)"			
1995	Jennifer Curry	Muscatine	21	Miss Johnson County	Vocal, "The Last Man In My Life" from Song and Dance			
1994	Tammy Truitt	Davenport	21	Miss Scott County	Dramatic Vocal, "I Still Believe" from Miss Saigon			
1993	Nancy Van Meter	Burlington	24	Miss Burlington	Vocal, "Stand by Your Man"		Quality of Life Award 2nd runner-up	
1992	Catherine Lemkau	Muscatine	24	Miss Mississippi Valley Fair	Vocal, "Someone Like You" from Jekyll & Hyde	1st runner-up	Preliminary Talent Award Preliminary Swimsuit Award (tie)	
1991	Lisa Somodi	Muscatine	23	Miss Muscatine County	Classical Piano, "Hungarian Rhapsody No. 15"	3rd runner-up	Preliminary Talent Award	
1990	Kerri Rosenberg	Burlington	26	Miss Mississippi Valley Fair	Classical Vocal, "Ah, Je Veux Vivre" from Roméo et Juliette	Top 10		
1989	Jayna Sanchez	Davenport	24	Miss Cedar-Johnson County	Dance / Twirl, "Another Cha-Cha" by Santa Esmeralda		Non-finalist Talent Award	
1988	Tiffany DiBernardo	Bettendorf	19	Miss Scott County	Vocal, "I Go To Rio"			
1987	Robin Wolfram	Davenport	24	Miss Scott County	Popular Vocal, "Only You"			
1986	Darcy Benton	Delmar	19	Miss Clinton County	Vocal, "Someone to Watch Over Me"			
1985	Sherri Bowman	Council Bluffs	24	Miss Nishna Valley	Piano			
1984	Debra Deitering	Missouri Valley	23	Miss Southwest Iowa	Vocal, "This Is My Life"			
1983	Karri Nussle	Des Moines	19	Miss Polk County	Vocal, "Minute Waltz"			
1982	Linda Simon	DeWitt	23	Miss Clinton County	Baton Twirling		Non-finalist Talent Award	
1981	Darla Blocker	Davenport	19	Miss Scott County	Vocal, "But the World Goes Round"		Non-finalist Talent Award	
1980	Jane Patton	Council Bluffs	24	Miss Nishna Valley	Semi-Classical Vocal, "Climb Ev'ry Mountain" from The Sound of Music			
1979	Lori Froeling	Keokuk	20	Miss Keokuk	Flute, "Carnival of Venice"	Top 10		
1978	Mary England	Davenport	20	Miss Scott County	Piano, "Spellbound"			
1977	Debra Jo Scheller	Fort Dodge	23	Miss Emmet County	Popular Vocal, "Country Girl"			
1976	Ronda Frogley	Davenport	20	Miss Scott County	Popular Vocal, "Tomorrow"			
1975	Debbie Weuve	State Center	20	Miss Marshall County	Vocal, "Maybe This Time" from Cabaret			
1974	Jean Bollhoefer	Haverhill	25	Miss Marshall County	Popular Vocal, "Starting Here, Starting Now"		Non-finalist Talent Award	
1973	Lynette Henninger	Bettendorf	19	Miss Scott County	Ballet, "Color My World" & "Make No Sound"			
1972	Renee Stuedemann	Clinton	23	Miss Clinton County	Baton Twirling, "Can-Can" from Orpheus in the Underworld	Top 10		
1971	Judith Stephens	Clarinda	21	Miss Southwest Iowa	Piano, Rhapsody In Blue			
1970	Cheryl Browne	Decorah	20	Miss Decorah	Ballet, "Deep Purple"		Non-finalist Talent Award	First African American contestant to compete at a Miss America pageant Cheryl Adrienne Browne was a native of Jamaica, Queens, New York City, New York who attended Luther College in Decorah, Iowa.
1969	Lois Koth	Alta	20	Miss Storm Lake	Pipe Organ, "Toccata" by Charles-Marie Widor		Non-finalist Talent Award	
1968	Susan Thompson	Des Moines	21	Miss Des Moines	Piano, Warsaw Concerto	2nd runner-up	Preliminary Swimsuit Award	
1967	Lynda Jeanne Formanek	Belle Plaine	23	Miss Newton	Character Portrayal from Alice's Adventures in Wonderland	Top 10		
1966	Pamela Kae Ericson	Sioux City	19	Miss Sioux City	Semi-classical Vocal, "Love Is Where You Find It" from The Kissing Bandit			Pamela “Pam” Kae Ericson Kragt died at age 77 on January 2, 2025 in Cedar Falls, Iowa.
1965	Marie Mushro	Sioux City	19	Miss Sioux City	Ballet en Pointe, The Dying Swan		Miss Congeniality Non-finalist Talent Award	
1964	Carol Johnson	Ames	21	Miss Ames	Folk Vocal & Guitar			
1963	Carolyn Northway	Davenport	19	Miss Davenport	Piano, "Étude Op. 25, No. 8" by Frédéric Chopin		Non-finalist Talent Award	
1962	Joleen Wolf	Des Moines	19	Miss Des Moines	Interpretive Ballet, "Autumn Concerto" from The Four Seasons		Non-finalist Talent Award	
1961	Patti Whalen	Clinton	18	Miss Clinton County	Vocal Medley, "I Feel Pretty" & "Tonight" from West Side Story			
1960	Sally Neville	Davenport	18	Miss Davenport	Dramatic Reading, "Mother on a Moment's Notice"			
1959	Jacqueline Jean Baker	Grinnell	20	Miss Grinnell	Modern Interpretive Dance			
1958	Joanne MacDonald	Ames	20	Miss Ames	Dramatic Recitation from The White Cliffs of Dover	1st runner-up		
1957	Carol Fleck	Oskaloosa	19	Miss Southeast Iowa	Dance			
1956	Martha Christine Barsness	Decorah	20	Miss Decorah	Vocal, "Ah, Fors'e Lui" from La Traviata		Non-finalist Talent Award	Martha Christine Barsness Jensen passed away at age 88 on February 14, 2025 after a battle with cancer.
1955	Kay Taylor	Iowa City	20	Miss Cedar Rapids	Tap Dance, "French Maids Dreaming of Marriage"			
1954	Carol Ann Laverne Morris	Ottumwa	18	Miss Ottumwa	Violin			Later Miss Iowa USA 1956; Later Miss USA 1956 and Miss Universe 1956
1953	Constance VerHoef	Sheldon	18	Miss Sheldon	Vocal			
1952	Carolyn Hill	Cedar Falls	19	Miss Waterloo	Vocal, "You're My Everything"			
1951	Nancy Jane Norman	Shenandoah	19	Miss Southwest Iowa	Vocal, "Romance" from The Desert Song			
1950	Mary Virginia Lines	Clarinda	18	Miss Southwest Iowa	Piano / Marimba, "Stardust"			
1949	Barbara Juel	Council Bluffs	20	Miss Council Bluffs	Classical Vocal, "Strie la Vampa" from Il trovatore			
1948	No Iowa representative at Miss America pageant							
1947	Ruth Janet Anderson	Oelwein	19	Miss Fayette County	Vocal, "You Made Me Love You"			
1946	Jacquline Means	Des Moines	19	Miss Des Moines	Acrobatic Dance			
1945	Jeanne Gordon	Des Moines	19	Miss Des Moines				
1944	No Iowa representative at Miss America pageant							
1943	No Iowa representative at Miss America pageant							
1942	No Iowa representative at Miss America pageant							
1941	Lorene Snoddy	Des Moines	20					
1940	No Iowa representative at Miss America pageant							
1939	No Iowa representative at Miss America pageant							
1938	No Iowa representative at Miss America pageant							
1937	No Iowa representative at Miss America pageant							
1936	Carol Bailey	Waterloo	16	Miss Waterloo				
1935	Connie Rosefield	Des Moines	18	Miss Des Moines				No Miss Iowa Competed as Miss Des Moines at Miss America pageant
1934	No national pageant was held							
1933	Eleanor Dankenbring	Manning	20					
1932	No national pageants were held							
1931	No national pageants were held							
1930	No national pageants were held							
1929	No national pageants were held							
1928	No national pageants were held							
1927	Geneva Roberts	Storm Lake	19	Miss Storm Lake				
1926	No Iowa representative at Miss America pageant							
1925	Dorothy Nordyke			Miss Sioux City				No Miss Iowa Contestants competed under local title at Miss America pageant
1924	Alta Sterling			Miss Sioux City				No Miss Iowa Contestants competed under local title at Miss America pageant
1923	No Iowa representative at Miss America pageant							
1922	No Iowa representative at Miss America pageant							
1921	No Iowa representative at Miss America pageant							
