= Lindsey Petrosh =

American beauty pageant titleholder

- Born: Lindsey Ann Petrosh; January 14, 1989 (age 37); Egg Harbor City, New Jersey, US
- Education: Rowan University
- Beauty pageant titleholder
- Title: Miss New Jersey's Outstanding Teen 2006; Miss Atlantic County 2012; Miss New Jersey 2012
- Hair color: Blonde
- Eye color: Brown
- Major competitions: Miss America's Outstanding Teen 2007; Miss America 2013
- Website: lindseypetrosh.com

Lindsey Ann Petrosh (born January 14, 1989) is an American beauty pageant titleholder from Egg Harbor City, New Jersey who was named Miss New Jersey 2012.

== Early life and education ==
Petrosh was born in Egg Harbor City, New Jersey. She graduated in 2007 from Saint Joseph High School. She received bachelor's and master's degrees from Rowan University.

== Pageant career ==
Petrosh participated in her first pageant at age 16. At age 17, she won the title of Miss New Jersey's Outstanding Teen in 2006. She subsequently competed in the Miss America's Outstanding Teen pageant in 2007.now has three kids

Petrosh won the title of Miss New Jersey on June 16, 2012. It was her second attempt at the crown; she had also competed in 2010. Her competition talent was a vocal performance of "The Battle Hymn of the Republic".

Awards and achievements
Preceded by Katharyn Nicolle	Miss New Jersey; 2012	Succeeded by Cara McCollum
Preceded by Katie Berry	Miss New Jersey's Outstanding Teen; 2006	Succeeded by Kaitlyn Schoeffel
