= Miss New Jersey =

Beauty pageant competition

- Formation: 1921
- Type: Beauty pageant
- Headquarters: Newark
- Location: New Jersey
- Members: Miss America
- Official language: English
- Website: Miss New Jersey official website

The Miss New Jersey competition is an annual pageant held to select the representative for the state of New Jersey in the Miss America pageant.

Two Miss New Jersey winners have gone on to hold the title of Miss America: Bette Cooper who won in 1937 and Suzette Charles who did not win, but took over the title for the last 7 weeks of Vanessa Williams's reign in 1984. They also have one unofficial Miss America: Dorothy Hann (1932).

In the fall of 2018, the Miss America Organization terminated the Miss New Jersey organization's license as well as licenses from Florida, Georgia, New York, Pennsylvania, Tennessee, and West Virginia. On December 26, 2018; MAO reinstated the license for the Miss New Jersey organization for one year, contingent on leadership changes and the recruitment of new sponsors and board members.

Kylie Wright of Egg Harbor Township was crowned Miss New Jersey on June 20, 2026, at the Ocean City Music Pier in Ocean City, New Jersey. She competed for the title of Miss America 2027 on September 6, 2026, at the Kravis Center for the Performing Arts in West Palm Beach, Florida.

== Gallery of past titleholders ==
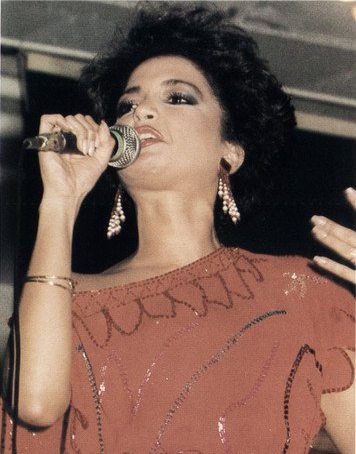
Suzette Charles,
Miss New Jersey 1983 and Miss America 1984

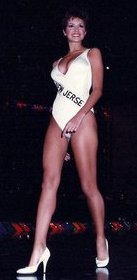
Toni Georgiana,
Miss New Jersey 1985

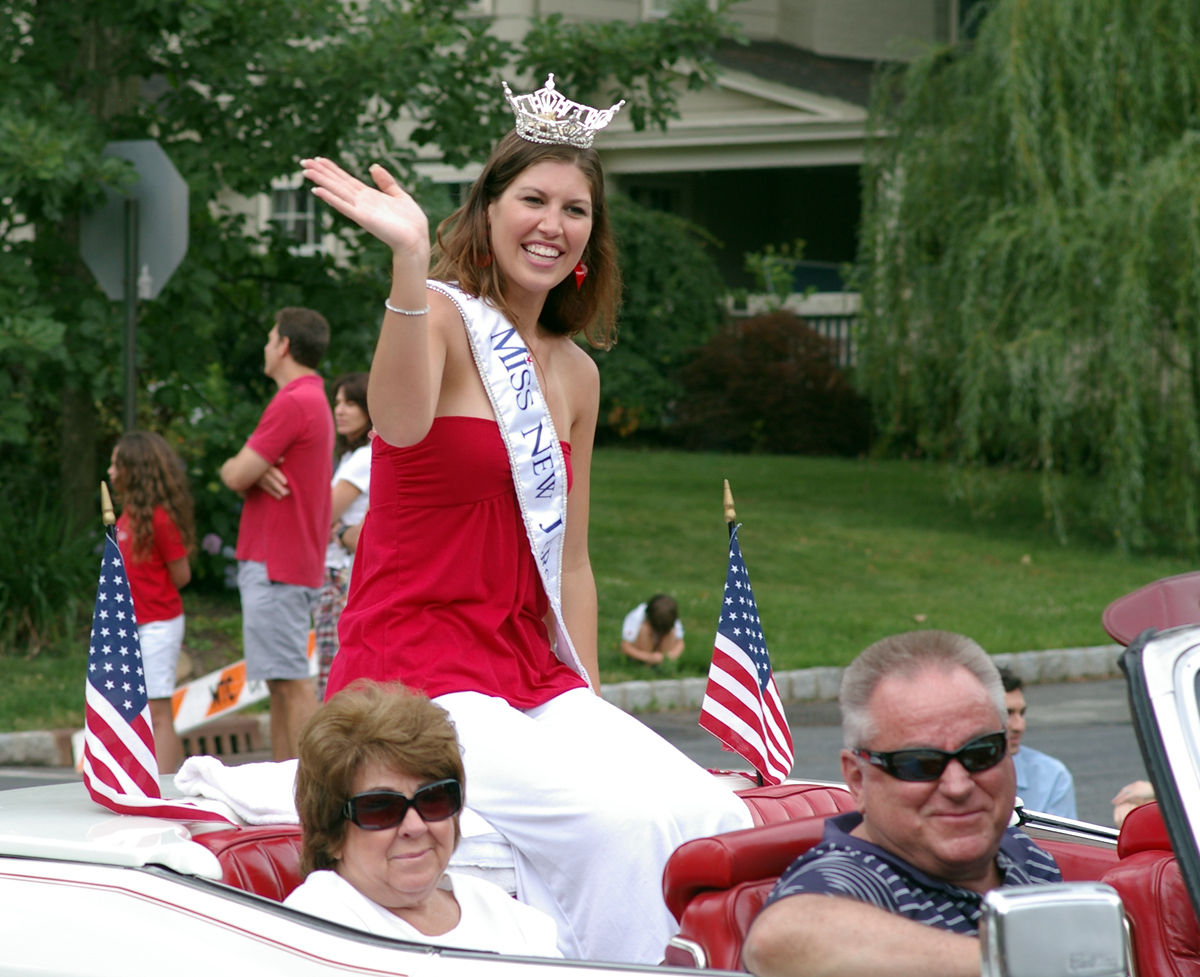
Ashley Fairfield,
Miss New Jersey 2008, at the 2008 Montclair 4th of July Parade

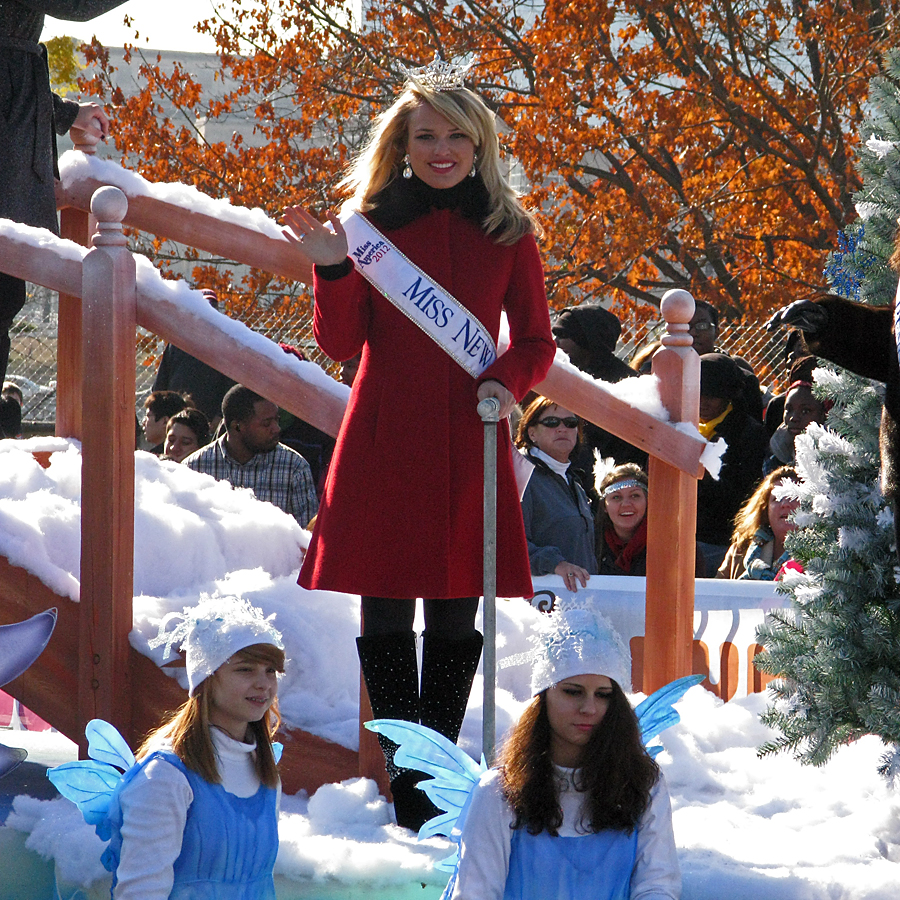
Lindsey Petrosh,
Miss New Jersey 2012, at the 2012 Philadelphia Thanksgiving Day Parade

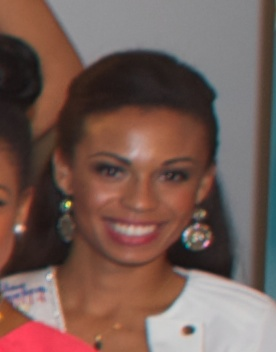
Cierra Kaler-Jones,
Miss New Jersey 2014

== Results summary ==
The following is a visual summary of the past results of Miss New Jersey titleholders at the national Miss America pageants/competitions. The year in parentheses indicates the year of the national competition during which a placement and/or award was garnered, not the year attached to the contestant's state title.

=== Placements ===
- Miss America: Bette Cooper (1937)
- 1st runners-up: Kathryn M. Gearon (1921), Suzette Charles (1984) (Note: Served as Miss America 1984 for seven weeks after the resignation of Vanessa Williams)
- 2nd runners-up: Magaret Bates (1921), Cheryl Carter (1970), Suzanne Plummer (1974), Therese Hanley (1981), Jennifer Makris (1995), Kaitlyn Schoeffel (2018)
- 3rd runners-up: Ruth Brady (1938), Madeline Layton (1942), Mary D'Arcy (1978)
- Top 10: Emerita Monsch (1924), Emily Borbach (1924), Kathleen Harris (1943), Betty Jane Crowley (1949), Michele Sexton (1994), Victoria Paige (2000), Jill Horner (2001)
- Top 12: Mary Dillinger (1935), Elizabeth Koehler (1935)
- Top 15: Edith Becker (1924), Helen Corcoran (1925), Frances M. Glowaski (1925), Evelynne Jeanne Crowell (1926), Mildred Morlock (1926), Carolyn Pierson (1927), Margo Lundgren (1939), Delores Mendes (1947), Jennifer Farrell (2004), Jade Glab (2020)
- Top 16: June Stephens (1951)
- Top 18: Gertrude Christman (1933)

=== Awards ===
==== Preliminary awards ====
- Preliminary Fitness: Kylie Gene Wright (2027)
- Preliminary Evening Wear: Alicia Luciano (2003)
- Preliminary Lifestyle & Fitness: Suzanne Plummer (1974), Kathy Nejat (1998)
- Preliminary On Stage Interview: Jade Glab (2020)
- Preliminary Talent: Ruth E. Brady (1938), Suzette Charles (1984), Heather Hertling (1993), Kylie Gene Wright (2027)

==== Non-finalist awards ====
- Non-finalist Talent: Marilyn Beryl Rockafellow (1959), Georgia Malick (1963), Linda Gialanella (1973), Debra Naley (1982), Patricia La Terra (1985), Patricia Bowman (1989), Laura Murray (1990), Heather Hertling (1993), Dena Querubin (1996), Kathy Nejat (1998), Stephanie Ferrari (1999), Erica Scanlon (2005), Amy Polumbo (2008)

==== Other awards ====
- Miss Congeniality: Betty Jane Crowley (1949) (tie), Patricia Condon (1954)
- Amateur Beauty Award: Kathryn M. Gearon (1921)
- Amateur Beauty Award Second Prize: Mary Elizabeth Edwards (1922)
- Amateur Beauty Award Third Prize: Estelle Marks (1922)
- Jean Bartel Social Impact Initiative 2nd runner-up: Alyssa Sullivan (2022)
- Overall Elegance and Lifestyle Award: Alicia Luciano (2003)
- Quality of Life Award Winners: Dena Querubin (1996), Lindsey Gianinni (2016)
- Quality of Life Award 2nd runners-up: Jill Horner (2001), Ashleigh Udalovas (2011)
- Quality of Life Award Finalists: Jaime Gialloreto (2019), Cierra Kaler-Jones (2014)

== Winners ==
- Declared as winner
- Ended as a runner-up
- Ended as a finalist or semi-finalist

Year	Name	Hometown	Age	Local Title	Miss America Talent	Placement at Miss America	Special scholarships at Miss America	Notes
2026	Kylie Gene Wright	Egg Harbor Township	20	Miss Cumberland County	Karate		Preliminary Fitness Award Preliminary Talent Award	
2025	Belle Nicholas	West Deptford	26	Miss Seashore Line	Vocal			
2024	Elizabeth Mendel	Cape May Court House	22	Miss South Jersey	Lyrical Dance, "It's All Coming Back to Me"			
2023	Victoria Mozitis	Northfield	22	Miss Cape Shores	Musical Theater Vocal			
2022	Augostina Mallous	Cape May Court House	20	Miss Southern Maritime	Acrobatic Dance		Miss America Scholarship Foundation For Fundraising 2nd Runner up.	Previously Miss New Jersey's Outstanding Teen 2017
2021	Alyssa Marie Sullivan	Cape May Court House	25	Miss Seashore Line	Vocal		Jean Bartel Social Impact Initiative 2nd runner-up	Previously Miss New Jersey's Outstanding Teen 2013
2019–20 (Note: Titleholder extended to a second full year in 2020 after state and national pageants postponed to 2021 due to the COVID-19 pandemic)	Jade Glab	Belmar	19	Miss Central Jersey Beaches	Classical Vocal, "O mio babbino caro" from Gianni Schicchi	Top 15	Preliminary On Stage Interview Award	Later Miss DC World America 2023 (2RU at Miss World America 2023) Named Miss World America 2026 on July 11, 2026
2018	Jaime Gialloreto	Woolwich Township	18	Miss South Shore	Contemporary Jazz Dance, "Natural Woman"		Quality of Life Award Finalist	Later Philadelphia Eagles Cheerleader
2017	Kaitlyn Schoeffel	Egg Harbor Township	24	Miss Eastern Shore	Dance, "SHUT UP + DANCE"	2nd runner-up		Previously Miss New Jersey's Outstanding Teen 2007
2016	Brenna Weick	Mantua Township	22	Miss Seashore Line	Vocal			Previously Miss New Jersey's Outstanding Teen 2009; 1st runner-up at Miss America's Outstanding Teen 2010 pageant Top 10 at National Sweetheart 2013 pageant
2015	Lindsey Giannini	Hammonton	21	Miss Central Coast	Jazz Dance, "Celebrate" by Pitbull		Quality of Life Award	
2014	Cierra Kaler-Jones	Galloway	21	Miss Coastal Shore	Dance, "Listen" by Beyoncé			
2013	Cara McCollum	Princeton	21	Miss Island Resort	Piano, "White Water Chopsticks"			Died on February 22, 2016, after being in a single-vehicle accident a week prior
2012	Lindsey Petrosh	Egg Harbor City	23	Miss Atlantic County	Vocal, "Battle Hymn of the Republic"			Previously Miss New Jersey's Outstanding Teen 2006
2011	Katharyn Nicolle	Wenonah	20	Miss Coastal Shore	Ballet en Pointe, "Theme from Superman"			Previously Miss New Jersey's Outstanding Teen 2008
2010	Ashleigh Udalovas	Millville	22	Miss All State	Tap Dance, "Star Dancer"		Quality of Life Award 2nd runner-up	Contestant at National Sweetheart 2007 & 2008 pageants
2009	Ashley Shaffer	Perrineville	23	Miss Columbus Day	Classical Vocal, "Nessun dorma"			
2008	Ashley Fairfield	Egg Harbor Township	22	Miss Columbus Day	Jazz Dance, "Man of La Mancha"			
2007	Amy Polumbo	Howell	23	Miss Seashore Line	Vocal, "Astonishing" from Little Women		Non-finalist Talent Award	
2006	Georgine DiMaria	Lodi	22	Miss All State	Violin, "Csárdás" by Vittorio Monti			Contestant at National Sweetheart 2004 pageant. Georgine M. DiMaria died at home in Lodi, N.J. at age 37 on August 28, 2021.
2005	Julie Robenhymer	Moorestown	24	Miss Burlington County	Dance, "Hit Me With a Hot Note" from Sophisticated Ladies			
2004	Erica Scanlon	Pitman	22	Miss Brigantine Resort	Vocal, "Glitter & Be Gay" from Candide		Non-finalist Talent Award	
2003	Jennifer Farrell	Margate	19	Miss Atlantic County	Ballet en Pointe, "Via Dolorosa"	Top 15		
2002	Alicia Luciano	Stanhope	19	Miss Tri County	Lyrical Dance, "The Prayer"		Overall Elegance and Lifestyle Award Preliminary Evening Wear Award	Former Radio City Rockette
2001	Julie Barber	Vineland	24	Miss Union County	Ballet en Pointe, "Do You Wanna Dance?"			
2000	Jill Horner	Gloucester Township	21	Miss Monmouth County Area	Vocal, "You're Gonna Hear From Me" from Inside Daisy Clover	Top 10	Quality of Life Award 2nd runner-up	
1999	Victoria Paige	Sparta	20	Miss Watchung Valley	Classical Vocal, "Non so più cosa son" from The Marriage of Figaro	Top 10		
1998	Stephanie Ferrari	Glen Rock	24	Miss Bergen County	Vocal, "My Heart Will Go On"		Non-finalist Talent Award	
1997	Kathy Nejat	Voorhees	21	Miss Central Coast	Classical Ballet en Pointe, "The Dying Swan"		Non-finalist Talent Award Preliminary Swimsuit Award	
1996	Melanie Bell	Vernon	20	Miss Northern Lights	Dance, "They Can't Take That Away From Me"			
1995	Dena Querubin	Waterford	23	Miss Spring Lake Heights	Classical Piano		Non-finalist Talent Award Quality of Life Award	Now known as Dena Blizzard, comedienne and often host of Miss America preliminary competition
1994	Jennifer Makris	Cherry Hill	21	Miss Essex County	Jazz Vocal, "The Man that Got Away"	2nd runner-up		Later Miss New Jersey USA 1997; Top 10 at Miss USA 1997 pageant
1993	Michele Sexton	Spring Lake Heights	24	Miss Central Coast	Classical Vocal, "Vissi d'arte"	Top 10		
1992	Heather Hertling	Randolph	24	Miss Morris County	Classical Vocal, "Ernani Involami"		Non-finalist Talent Award Preliminary Talent Award	Judge at the Miss America 1997 pageant
1991	Amy Fissel	Ocean City	24	Miss Shore Resort	Comedic Monologue, "Mountaineer's Motorcycle"			Later Miss New Jersey USA 1993; Top 6 at Miss USA 1993 pageant
1990	Lynette Falls	Ridgewood	25	Miss Camden County	Classical Piano, "4th Movement of Piano Sonata No. 1, Op. 22" by Alberto Ginastera			Mother of Miss Louisiana 2017, Laryssa Bonacquisti
1989	Laura Murray	Livingston	25	Miss Shore Resort	Popular Vocal, "With One More Look At You" from A Star Is Born		Non-finalist Talent Award	
1988	Patricia Bowman	Ocean City	19	Miss Cape May County	Vocal, "Wind Beneath My Wings"		Non-finalist Talent Award	
1987	Robin Lange	Medford	22	Miss Burlington County	Dramatic Monologue			
1986	Karyn Zosche	Pine Brook	25	Miss Passaic County	Piano, Rhapsody in Blue			
1985	Toni Georgiana	Cherry Hill	21	Miss Mercer County	Acrobatic Dance, "Slaughter on Tenth Avenue"			
1984	Patricia La Terra	West New York	24	Miss Bergen County	Dramatic Monologue		Non-finalist Talent Award	
1983	Suzette Charles	Mays Landing	20	Miss Columbus Day	Popular Vocal, "Kiss Me In the Rain"	1st runner-up	Preliminary Talent Award	Named Miss America when Vanessa Williams relinquished title
1982	Christina Criscione	Pequannock	22	Miss Dover-Morris	Classical Vocal, "Non Piu Mesta" from La Cenerentola			
1981	Debra Naley	Rockaway	26	Miss Greater Dover-West Morris	Violin Medley, "Csárdás" & "Orange Blossom Special"		Non-finalist Talent Award	
1980	Therese Hanley	Jersey City	17	Miss Bergen County	Popular Vocal, "Starting Here, Starting Now"	2nd runner-up (tie)		
1979	Mary McGinnis	Somers Point	22	Miss Collegiate	Clarinet, "Hora"			
1978	Laurie Berchtold	Ocean City	21	Miss Glassboro State College	Vocal, "Money, Money" from Cabaret			
1977	Mary D'Arcy	Yardville	21	Miss Glassboro State College	Semi-classical Vocal, "Summertime"	3rd runner-up		Judge at the Miss America 1991 pageant
1976	Lori Johnson	Medford	19	Miss Burlington County	Acrobatic Dance, "Love Is the Answer"			
1975	Nancy Craig	Trenton	25	Miss Trenton State College	Classical Ballet en Pointe, Swan Lake			
1974	Elizabeth Bracken	Mahwah	21	Miss Bergen County	Dramatic monologue, "Elizabeth Umpstead" by Carl Sandburg			
1973	Suzanne Plummer	Wildwood	21	Miss Cape May County	Piano, "Stardust"	2nd runner-up	Preliminary Swimsuit Award	Previously Miss District of Columbia USA 1971; Top 12 at Miss USA 1971 pageant Former leader of Nevada State Republican Party and 2010 Senate Candidate
1972	Linda Gialanella	Maplewood	22	Miss Fanwood-Scotch Plains	Sketching Presentation, "Teaching the World to Draw"		Non-finalist Talent Award	
1971	Lynn Hackerman	Mount Laurel	18	Miss Greater Moorestown & Miss Burlington County	Pantomime Dance			Formerly served on the Miss America board of directors with Sam Haskell
1970	Hela Yungst	Hillside	20	Miss Fanwood-Scotch Plains	Dramatic Vocal, "Aldonza" from Man of La Mancha			
1969	Cheryl Carter	Matawan	19	Miss Monmouth County	Piano, Theme from An Affair to Remember	2nd runner-up (tie)		
1968	Jeannette Phillipuk	Laurel Springs	20	Miss Glassboro State College	Vocal Medley, "The Sweetest Sounds" & "Nobody Told Me" from No Strings			
1967	Linda Ann Wilmer	Laurel Springs	18	Miss Glassboro State College	Classical Vocal, "Quando m'en vò" from La bohème			
1966	Christine Ebright	Rahway	19	Miss Newark State College	Operatic Vocal, "Un bel di vedremo"			
1965	Kathleen Holmes	Toms River	19	Miss Toms River	Vocal / Tap Dance, "Steppin' Out with My Baby"			
1964	Susan Krasnomowitz	Fair Lawn	19	Miss Paterson	Jazz Dance			
1963	Janet Bryan Adams	Hopatcong		Miss Pequannock	Dramatic Monologue			
1962	Georgia Malick	Cherry Hill	18	Miss Cherry Hill	Piano, "Deep Purple"		Non-finalist Talent Award	
1961	Marilyn Haufler	Watchung	18	Miss Fanwood-Scotch Plains	Comedic Monologue			
1960	Ann Barber	Westfield	18	Miss Fanwood-Scotch Plains				
1959	Beverly Ann Domareki	Mountainside	20		Original Dramatic Interpretation of a Beatnik			
1958	Marilyn Beryl Rockafellow	New Monmouth	19		Vocal		Non-finalist Talent Award	
1957	Janet Ressler	Union			Vocal			
1956	Beverly Cass	Fair Lawn			Piano			
1955	Patricia Campbell	Camden			Dance			
1954	Sally Joan Waller	West Orange			Vocal / Dance, "Singin' in the Rain"			Sally Joan "Joni" Waller Jaeger died at age 87 on March 16, 2024.
1953	Patricia Condon	Maplewood			Vocal		Miss Congeniality	
1952	Mary Parker	Gibbsboro			Drama			
1951	Bernice Massi	Camden						
1950	June Stephens	Ship Bottom			Comic Sketch, "The Older Set"	Top 16		
1949	Betty Jane Kathleen Crowley	Egg Harbor	19		Poetry Recitation & Vocal, "Might Like a Rose"	Top 15	Miss Congeniality (tie)	
1948	Barbara Jean Anderson	Bloomfield	19					
1947	Delores Mendes	Newark			Vocal & Guitar medley, "I Close My Eyes" & "Siboney"	Top 15		
1946	Helen Sprinitis	Kearny						
1945	Matilda Agin	New Brunswick						
1944	Janice Hansen	Union City						
1943	Kathleen Harris	Newark			Vocal, "Gianni Mio"	Top 10		
1942	Madeline Layton	Maywood			Vocal, "Saturday Night"	3rd runner-up		
1941	Marjorie Eleanor Jennings	Dover						
1940	Mildred Marie Selko	Kearny						
1939	Kathleen Kirkland	Maplewood				N/A		
1939	Margo Lundgren	Harrison			Whistling Tunes Vocal, "Don't Worry About Me"	Top 15		
1938	Ruth E. Brady	Asbury Park		Miss Asbury Park	Vocal & Tap Dance	3rd runner-up	Preliminary Talent Award	Multiple New Jersey representatives Contestants competed under local title at Miss America pageant
1938	Ruth Joan Sada	Burlington		Miss Burlington				Multiple New Jersey representatives Contestants competed under local title at Miss America pageant
1938	Gloria Martha Riley	Paterson		Miss New Jersey				Multiple New Jersey representatives Contestants competed under local title at Miss America pageant
1938	Dorothy Kathryn Powers	Riverside		Miss Riverside				Multiple New Jersey representatives Contestants competed under local title at Miss America pageant
1937	Bette Cooper	Hackettstown	17	Miss Bertrand Island	Vocal, "When the Poppies Bloom Again"	Winner	Evening Gown Award	Multiple New Jersey representatives Contestants competed under local title at Miss America pageant
1937	Helen Frances Murphy	Riverside		Miss Riverside				Multiple New Jersey representatives Contestants competed under local title at Miss America pageant
1937	Margaret Julia Jardon	Burlington		Miss South Jersey				Multiple New Jersey representatives Contestants competed under local title at Miss America pageant
1936	Thelma Bieber	Camden		Miss Camden				Multiple New Jersey representatives Contestants competed under local title at Miss America pageant
1936	Evelyn Pierce	Riverside		Miss South Jersey				Multiple New Jersey representatives Contestants competed under local title at Miss America pageant
1935	Mildred Hughes			Miss Bloomfield				Multiple New Jersey representatives Contestants competed under local title at Miss America pageant
1935	Geraldine Hester	Bridgeton		Miss Bridgeton				Multiple New Jersey representatives Contestants competed under local title at Miss America pageant
1935	Mary Dillinger	Burlington		Miss Burlington	Vocal, "Every Little Moment"	Top 12		Multiple New Jersey representatives Contestants competed under local title at Miss America pageant
1935	Lena Melamed	Camden		Miss Camden				Multiple New Jersey representatives Contestants competed under local title at Miss America pageant
1935	Dorothy Wainwright	Hillside		Miss Hillside				Multiple New Jersey representatives Contestants competed under local title at Miss America pageant
1935	Ann Golden			Miss Lake Hopatcong				Multiple New Jersey representatives Contestants competed under local title at Miss America pageant
1935	Esther Moore	Mount Holly		Miss Mount Holly				Multiple New Jersey representatives Contestants competed under local title at Miss America pageant
1935	Ann Harvey	Newark		Miss Newark				Multiple New Jersey representatives Contestants competed under local title at Miss America pageant
1935	Norine Hughes	Glen Ridge		Miss New Jersey				Multiple New Jersey representatives Contestants competed under local title at Miss America pageant
1935	Elizabeth Koehler	Penns Grove		Miss Penns Grove	Vocal Medley, "Without a Song" & "Roll Out of Bed with a Smile"	Top 12		Multiple New Jersey representatives Contestants competed under local title at Miss America pageant
1935	Othelia March	Riverside		Miss Riverside				Multiple New Jersey representatives Contestants competed under local title at Miss America pageant
1935	Ann Halko	West Orange		Miss West Orange				Multiple New Jersey representatives Contestants competed under local title at Miss America pageant
1935	Thelma Fouks	Woodbury		Miss Woodbury				Multiple New Jersey representatives Contestants competed under local title at Miss America pageant
1934	No national pageant was held							
1933	Gertrude Christman		15			Top 18		
1932	No national pageants were held							
1931	No national pageants were held							
1930	No national pageants were held							
1929	No national pageants were held							
1928	No national pageants were held							
1927	Helen Mankus			Miss Elizabeth				Multiple New Jersey representatives Contestants competed under local title at Miss America pageant
1927	Eunice Geiser			Miss Jersey City				Multiple New Jersey representatives Contestants competed under local title at Miss America pageant
1927	Carolyn Pierson			Miss Newark		Top 15		Multiple New Jersey representatives Contestants competed under local title at Miss America pageant
1927	Harriet Rita Shelby			Miss Passaic				Multiple New Jersey representatives Contestants competed under local title at Miss America pageant
1927	Sue Hoch			Miss Union City				Multiple New Jersey representatives Contestants competed under local title at Miss America pageant
1926	Mary Mavretic			Miss Brigantine Beach				Multiple New Jersey representatives Contestants competed under local title at Miss America pageant
1926	Name not known			Miss Canarsie				Multiple New Jersey representatives Contestants competed under local title at Miss America pageant
1926	Lucy Taylor			Miss Elizabeth				Multiple New Jersey representatives Contestants competed under local title at Miss America pageant
1926	Anita Limbacker			Miss Hoboken				Multiple New Jersey representatives Contestants competed under local title at Miss America pageant
1926	Mildred Morlock			Miss Newark		Top 15		Multiple New Jersey representatives Contestants competed under local title at Miss America pageant
1926	Evelynne Jeanne Crowell			Miss Orange		Top 15		Multiple New Jersey representatives Contestants competed under local title at Miss America pageant
1926	Elizabeth Welch			Miss Union City				Multiple New Jersey representatives Contestants competed under local title at Miss America pageant
1926	Kathleen Coyle			Miss Wildwood Gables				Multiple New Jersey representatives Contestants competed under local title at Miss America pageant
1925	Lee Bartlett							Multiple New Jersey representatives Contestants competed under local title at Miss America pageant
1925	Frances M. Glowaski			Miss Jersey City		Top 15		Multiple New Jersey representatives Contestants competed under local title at Miss America pageant
1925	Helen Corcoran			Miss Newark		Top 15		Multiple New Jersey representatives Contestants competed under local title at Miss America pageant
1924	Edith Wright			Miss Bradley Beach				Multiple New Jersey representatives Contestants competed under local title at Miss America pageant
1924	Emily Borbach			Miss Cape May		Top 10		Multiple New Jersey representatives Contestants competed under local title at Miss America pageant
1924	Helen Mankus			Miss Elizabeth				Multiple New Jersey representatives Contestants competed under local title at Miss America pageant
1924	Alice Kind			Miss Hammonton				Multiple New Jersey representatives Contestants competed under local title at Miss America pageant
1924	Emerita Monsch			Miss Hoboken		Top 10		Multiple New Jersey representatives Contestants competed under local title at Miss America pageant
1924	Bonnie Blair			Miss Jersey City				Multiple New Jersey representatives Contestants competed under local title at Miss America pageant
1924	Name not known			Miss Kearny				Multiple New Jersey representatives Contestants competed under local title at Miss America pageant
1924	Name not known			Miss Long Beach				Multiple New Jersey representatives Contestants competed under local title at Miss America pageant
1924	Myrtle Marshall			Miss Margate City				Multiple New Jersey representatives Contestants competed under local title at Miss America pageant
1924	Edith Becker			Miss Newark		Top 15		Multiple New Jersey representatives Contestants competed under local title at Miss America pageant
1924	Gertrude McDonough			Miss Pleasantville				Multiple New Jersey representatives Contestants competed under local title at Miss America pageant
1924	Ethel Sipps			Miss Somers Point				Multiple New Jersey representatives Contestants competed under local title at Miss America pageant
1923	Alice Kind	Hammonton		Miss Hammonton	N/A			Multiple New Jersey representatives Contestants competed under local title at national pageant
1923	Mildred McCann	Cape May		Miss Cape May	N/A			Multiple New Jersey representatives Contestants competed under local title at national pageant
1923	Florence Nurock	Camden		Miss Camden	N/A			Multiple New Jersey representatives Contestants competed under local title at national pageant
1923	Elene Hicks	Long Branch	19	Miss Long Branch	N/A			Multiple New Jersey representatives Contestants competed under local title at national pageant
1923	Grace Taylor	Philadelphia		Miss Ocean City	N/A			Multiple New Jersey representatives Contestants competed under local title at national pageant
1923	Alma D. DeCone	Trenton		Miss Trenton	N/A			Multiple New Jersey representatives Contestants competed under local title at national pageant
1923	Mary E. Edwards	Vineland		Miss Vineland	N/A			Multiple New Jersey representatives Contestants competed under local title at national pageant
1923	Eleanor Addis	Wildwood		Miss Wildwood	N/A			Multiple New Jersey representatives Contestants competed under local title at national pageant
1922	Estelle Marks	Atlantic City		Miss Atlantic City	N/A		Amateur Beauty Award Third Prize	Multiple New Jersey representatives Contestants competed under local title at Miss America pageant
1922	Sarah Alice Bell	Bridgeton		Miss Bridgeton	N/A			Multiple New Jersey representatives Contestants competed under local title at Miss America pageant
1922	Eleanor Lindley	Greater Camden		Miss Greater Camden	N/A			Multiple New Jersey representatives Contestants competed under local title at Miss America pageant
1922	Marion Steelman	Ocean City		Miss Ocean City	N/A			Multiple New Jersey representatives Contestants competed under local title at Miss America pageant
1922	Mary Elizabeth Edwards	Vineland	18	Miss Vineland	N/A		Amateur Beauty Award Second Prize	Multiple New Jersey representatives Contestants competed under local title at Miss America pageant
1921	Katherine M. Gearon	Camden		Miss Camden	N/A	1st runner-up	Amateur Beauty Award	Multiple New Jersey representatives Contestants competed under local title at Miss America pageant
1921	Margaret Bates	Newark		Miss Newark	N/A	2nd runner-up		Multiple New Jersey representatives Contestants competed under local title at Miss America pageant
