= Hillside, New Jersey =

Township in Union County, New Jersey, US

- Township
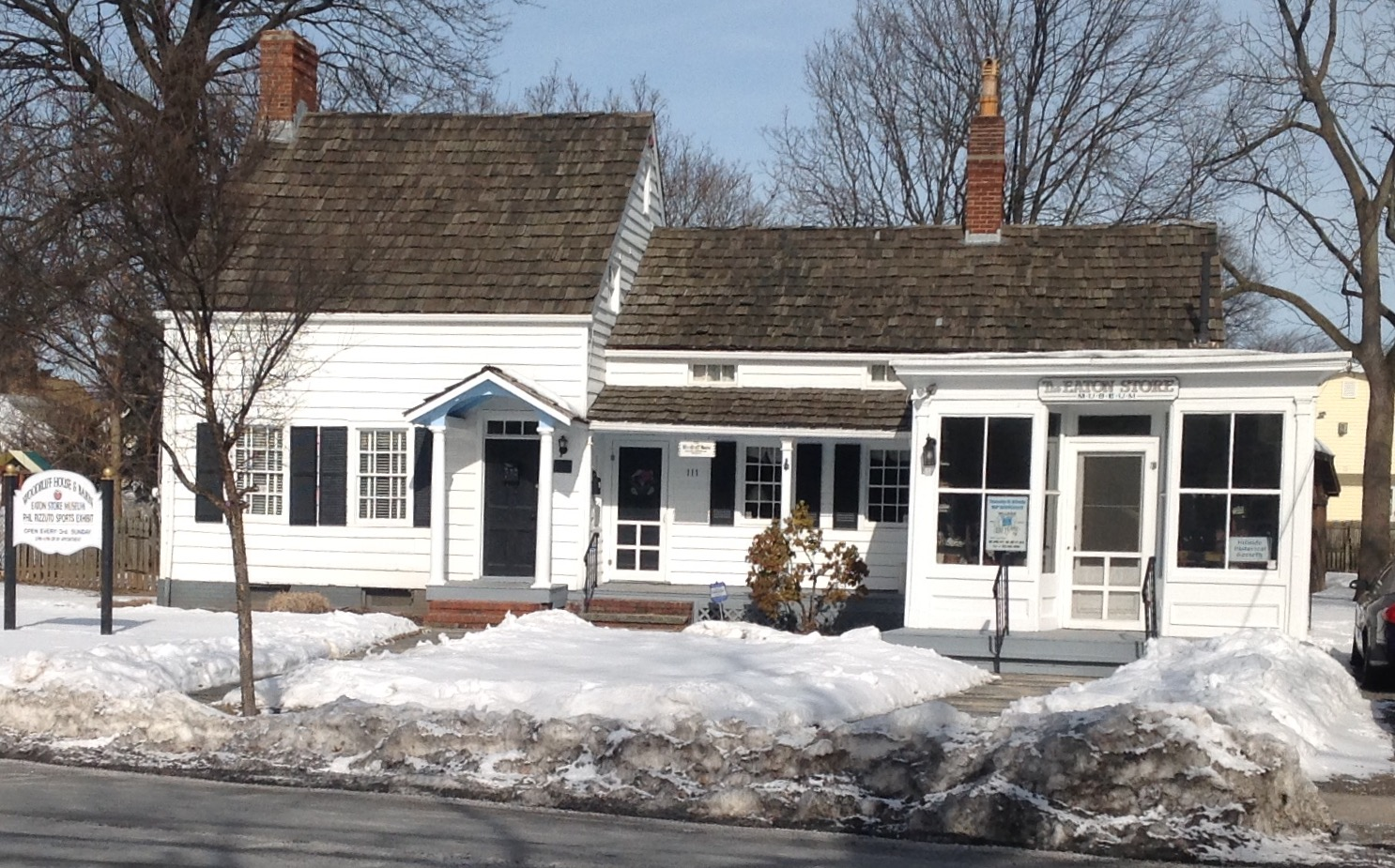
- Woodruff House

- Seal

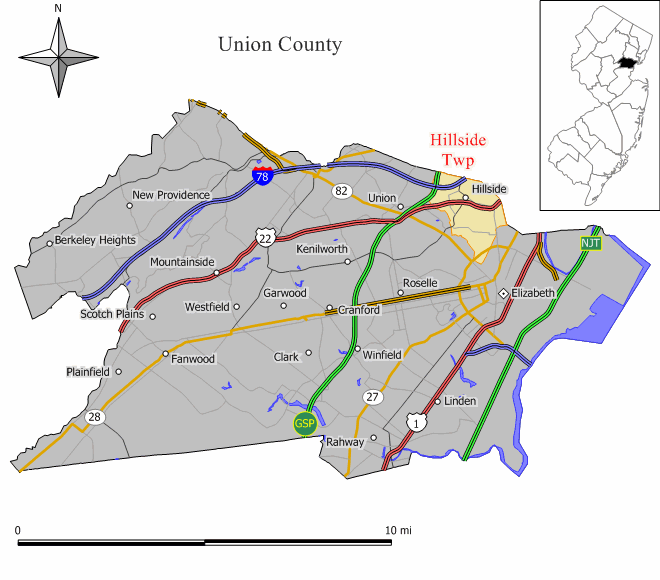
- Map of Hillside Township in Union County. Inset: Location of Union County highlighted in the State of New Jersey.

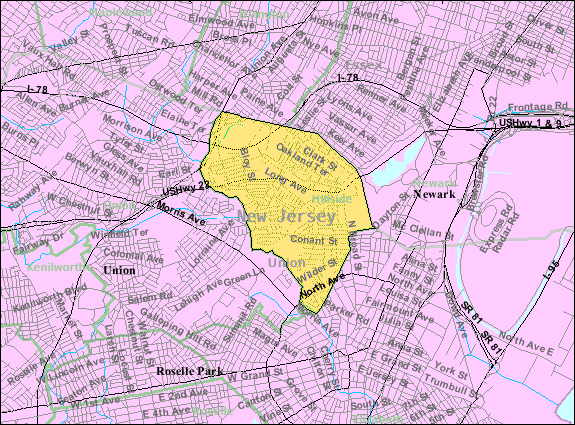
- Census Bureau map of Hillside, New Jersey

- Location in Union County Location in New Jersey Location in the United States
- Coordinates: 40.695889°N 74.2288°W
- Country: United States
- State: New Jersey
- County: Union
- Incorporated: April 29, 1913

Government
  - Type: Faulkner Act (mayor–council)
  - Body: Township Council
  - Mayor: Andrea Hyatt (term ends December 31, 2029)
  - Administrator: Hope M. Smith
  - Municipal clerk: Rayna Harris

Area
  - Total: 2.78 sq mi (7.20 km^{2})
  - Land: 2.77 sq mi (7.17 km^{2})
  - Water: 0.015 sq mi (0.04 km^{2}) 0.54%
  - Rank: 357th of 565 in state 15th of 21 in county
- Elevation: 56 ft (17 m)

Population (2020)
  - Total: 22,456
  - Estimate (2023): 21,991
  - Rank: 122nd of 565 in state 11th of 21 in county
  - Density: 8,115.6/sq mi (3,133.5/km^{2})
  - Rank: 48th of 565 in state 5th of 21 in county
- Time zone: UTC−05:00 (Eastern (EST))
  - Summer (DST): UTC−04:00 (Eastern (EDT))
- ZIP Code: 07205
- Area codes: 908 and 973
- FIPS code: 3403931980
- GNIS feature ID: 0882211
- Website: www.hillsidenj.us

Hillside is a township in Union County, in the U.S. state of New Jersey. As of the 2020 United States census, the township's population was 22,456, an increase of 1,052 (+4.9%) from the 2010 census count of 21,404, which in turn reflected a decline of 343 (−1.6%) from the 21,747 counted in the 2000 census.

Hillside was incorporated as a township on April 3, 1913, from portions of Union Township, based on the results of a referendum held on April 29, 1913. The township was named for the surrounding hills.

The township is split between area codes 908 and 973.

== History ==
Hillside was created from parcels of land carved out of neighboring Newark, Elizabeth, and Union. It originally contained the farms of Woodruff, Conant and Saybrook. Local streets still bear their names.

Hillside was incorporated shortly after the appearance of Halley's Comet in 1910, and for that reason, the team nickname of Hillside High School was made the "Comets" when the high school opened in 1940. Several local businesses take the name "Comet" for the same reason.

The Hillside Historical Society was established in the 1980s in the Woodruff home on Conant Street, perhaps the township's oldest. The Woodruff House and Eaton Store Museum is operated and maintained by the Hillside Historical Society. Purchased by the society in 1978, the house has been faithfully restored to its original grandeur. The Woodruff House spans three centuries in one structure, including the original 1735 building, the 1790 addition, the 1890s kitchen and the 1900s store. The society has also added to the grounds an authentic post and beam barn, a Phil Rizzuto and All Sports Museum honoring the Hillside legend as well as an archive to house the many documents the society has obtained over the years.

Jean-Ray Turner, a reporter for the Elizabeth Daily Journal, wrote Along the Upper Road in the 1970s, a book of the history of Hillside.

Hillside has been the home of Bristol-Myers Squibb. Lionel Trains were manufactured from 1929 to 1974 at a factory located in Hillside that employed as many as 2,000 employees. The town thrived for decades and reached an economic peak in the 1960s. Blue collar workers who lived primarily in the central part of town were employed in local manufacturing concerns. White collar workers established the neighborhood known as Westminster where Yankee shortstop and broadcaster Phil Rizzuto lived for most of his adult life, until his death. That section of town also included the private Pingry School for boys (which left the township) and is now the East Campus of Kean University.

In the 1950s and 1960s the township was approximately one-half Jewish, many of whom lived either in Westminster or in the area of Hillside near Chancellor Avenue, adjacent to the Weequahic section of Newark, which was the early home of comedian Jerry Lewis and writer Philip Roth (Portnoy's Complaint).

In the early 1950s the township established Conant Park, its largest. The park is bounded by the Elizabeth River and Conant Street. At the rear area of the park near Pingry School was the boundary of the Kean Estate, the boyhood home of Governor Thomas Kean (1982–1990). The wealthy Kean family also donated the land on Morris Avenue and helped to establish Newark Normal College in 1885, which was renamed Kean College, and later Kean University, in the family's honor. Also in the 1950s the Town Hall, Police Headquarters and Municipal Library were constructed at the corner of Liberty and Hillside Avenues.

Township organizations include Rotary International, Kiwanis, Knights of Columbus, Elks, the Hillside Industrial Association, the Hillside Business and Professional Women's Club, the Republican Club and the Democratic Club, as well as a number of ethnic clubs and associations.

In 1991, police from both Hillside and Newark fired nearly 40 shots at a van that had rammed a Hillside police vehicle after a high-speed chase. The pursuit had started after the van had been reported stolen at gunpoint in Newark and was being followed by three Newark police cars before crossing into Hillside. Two of the people inside the vehicle were killed and four of the five other passengers were wounded, though the Union County Prosecutor indicated that there was no clear explanation for why the police had started shooting. The Reverend Al Sharpton held a rally outside Town Hall on Hillside Avenue demanding that the police officers involved in the shootings should be prosecuted for their actions.

== Geography ==
According to the United States Census Bureau, the township had a total area of 2.78 square miles (7.20 km^{2}), including 2.77 square miles (7.17 km^{2}) of land and 0.02 square miles (0.04 km^{2}) of water (0.54%).

Unincorporated communities, localities and place names located partially or completely within the township include Lyons Farms and Saybrooke.

The township is located on the northern edge of Union County and is bordered to the northwest by Irvington and to the north and northeast by Newark, both in Essex County. Elizabeth borders Hillside to the east and southeast, while Union borders to the west.

=== Climate ===
The climate in this area is characterized by hot, humid summers and generally mild to cool winters. According to the Köppen Climate Classification system, Hillside has a humid subtropical climate, abbreviated "Cfa" on climate maps.

== Demographics ==
Historical population
Census	Pop.	Note	%±
1920	5,267		—
1930	17,601		234.2%
1940	18,556		5.4%
1950	21,007		13.2%
1960	22,304		6.2%
1970	21,636		−3.0%
1980	21,440		−0.9%
1990	21,044		−1.8%
2000	21,747		3.3%
2010	21,404		−1.6%
2020	22,456		4.9%
2023 (est.)	21,991		−2.1%
Population sources: 1920 1920–1930; 1940–2000 2000; 2010 2020

=== 2020 census ===
Hillside township, Union County, New Jersey – Racial and ethnic composition Note: the US Census treats Hispanic/Latino as an ethnic category. This table excludes Latinos from the racial categories and assigns them to a separate category. Hispanics/Latinos may be of any race.
Race / Ethnicity (NH = Non-Hispanic)	Pop 2000	Pop 2010	Pop 2020	% 2000	% 2010	% 2020
White alone (NH)	6,991	5,374	3,787	32.15%	25.11%	16.86%
Black or African American alone (NH)	9,961	11,091	11,327	45.80%	51.82%	50.44%
Native American or Alaska Native alone (NH)	25	33	25	0.11%	0.15%	0.11%
Asian alone (NH)	744	571	498	3.42%	2.67%	2.22%
Native Hawaiian or Pacific Islander alone (NH)	2	5	0	0.01%	0.02%	0.00%
Other race alone (NH)	180	207	537	0.83%	0.97%	2.39%
Mixed race or Multiracial (NH)	691	349	1,093	3.18%	1.63%	4.87%
Hispanic or Latino (any race)	3,153	3,774	5,189	14.50%	17.63%	23.11%
Total	21,747	21,404	22,456	100.00%	100.00%	100.00%

=== 2010 census ===
The 2010 United States census counted 21,404 people, 7,112 households, and 5,533 families in the township. The population density was 7,784.0 per square mile (3,005.4/km^{2}). There were 7,536 housing units at an average density of 2,740.6 per square mile (1,058.2/km^{2}). The racial makeup was 34.75% (7,438) White, 53.19% (11,384) Black or African American, 0.22% (47) Native American, 2.73% (585) Asian, 0.03% (7) Pacific Islander, 6.22% (1,332) from other races, and 2.85% (611) from two or more races. Hispanic or Latino of any race were 17.63% (3,774) of the population.

Of the 7,112 households, 33.2% had children under the age of 18; 48.7% were married couples living together; 22.0% had a female householder with no husband present and 22.2% were non-families. Of all households, 18.6% were made up of individuals and 6.6% had someone living alone who was 65 years of age or older. The average household size was 3.01 and the average family size was 3.41.

23.7% of the population were under the age of 18, 9.7% from 18 to 24, 26.9% from 25 to 44, 27.9% from 45 to 64, and 11.8% who were 65 years of age or older. The median age was 38.0 years. For every 100 females, the population had 86.8 males. For every 100 females ages 18 and older there were 84.3 males.

The Census Bureau's 2006–2010 American Community Survey showed that (in 2010 inflation-adjusted dollars) median household income was $55,520 (with a margin of error of +/− $5,760) and the median family income was $67,492 (+/− $5,643). Males had a median income of $44,421 (+/− $3,088) versus $42,927 (+/− $4,392) for females. The per capita income for the township was $35,486 (+/− $3,349). About 9.4% of families and 11.7% of the population were below the poverty line, including 15.7% of those under age 18 and 13.3% of those age 65 or over.

=== 2000 census ===
As of the 2000 United States census there were 21,747 people, 7,161 households, and 5,578 families residing in the township. The population density was 7,793.6 inhabitants per square mile (3,009.1/km^{2}). There were 7,388 housing units at an average density of 2,647.7 per square mile (1,022.3/km^{2}). The racial makeup of the township was 40.03% White, 46.54% African American, 0.23% Native American, 3.45% Asian, 0.08% Pacific Islander, 5.26% from other races, and 4.41% from two or more races. Hispanic or Latino of any race were 14.50% of the population. As of the 2000 Census, an adjusted 11.2% of residents listed themselves as being of Portuguese ancestry, the third-highest in New Jersey among communities in which more than 1,000 residents recorded an ancestry group.

There were 7,161 households, out of which 36.0% had children under the age of 18 living with them, 53.5% were married couples living together, 18.8% had a female householder with no husband present, and 22.1% were non-families. 18.0% of all households were made up of individuals, and 7.7% had someone living alone who was 65 years of age or older. The average household size was 3.04 and the average family size was 3.45.

In the township the population was spread out, with 25.6% under the age of 18, 8.9% from 18 to 24, 30.3% from 25 to 44, 24.1% from 45 to 64, and 11.1% who were 65 years of age or older. The median age was 36 years. For every 100 females, there were 88.3 males. For every 100 females age 18 and over, there were 84.2 males.

The median income for a household in the township was $59,136, and the median income for a family was $64,635. Males had a median income of $39,439 versus $31,817 for females. The per capita income for the township was $21,724. About 3.2% of families and 5.3% of the population were below the poverty line, including 5.4% of those under age 18 and 9.1% of those age 65 or over.

== Economy ==
Portions of the township are part of an Urban Enterprise Zone (UEZ), one of 32 zones covering 37 municipalities statewide. Hillside was selected in 1996 as one of a group of seven zones added to participate in the program. In addition to other benefits to encourage employment and investment within the UEZ, shoppers can take advantage of a reduced 3.3125% sales tax rate (half of the 6 5/8% rate charged statewide) at eligible merchants. Established in May 1996, the township's Urban Enterprise Zone status expires in May 2027.

== Arts and culture ==
Musical groups from Hillside include Blanks 77, a street punk band.

== Government ==
=== Local government ===
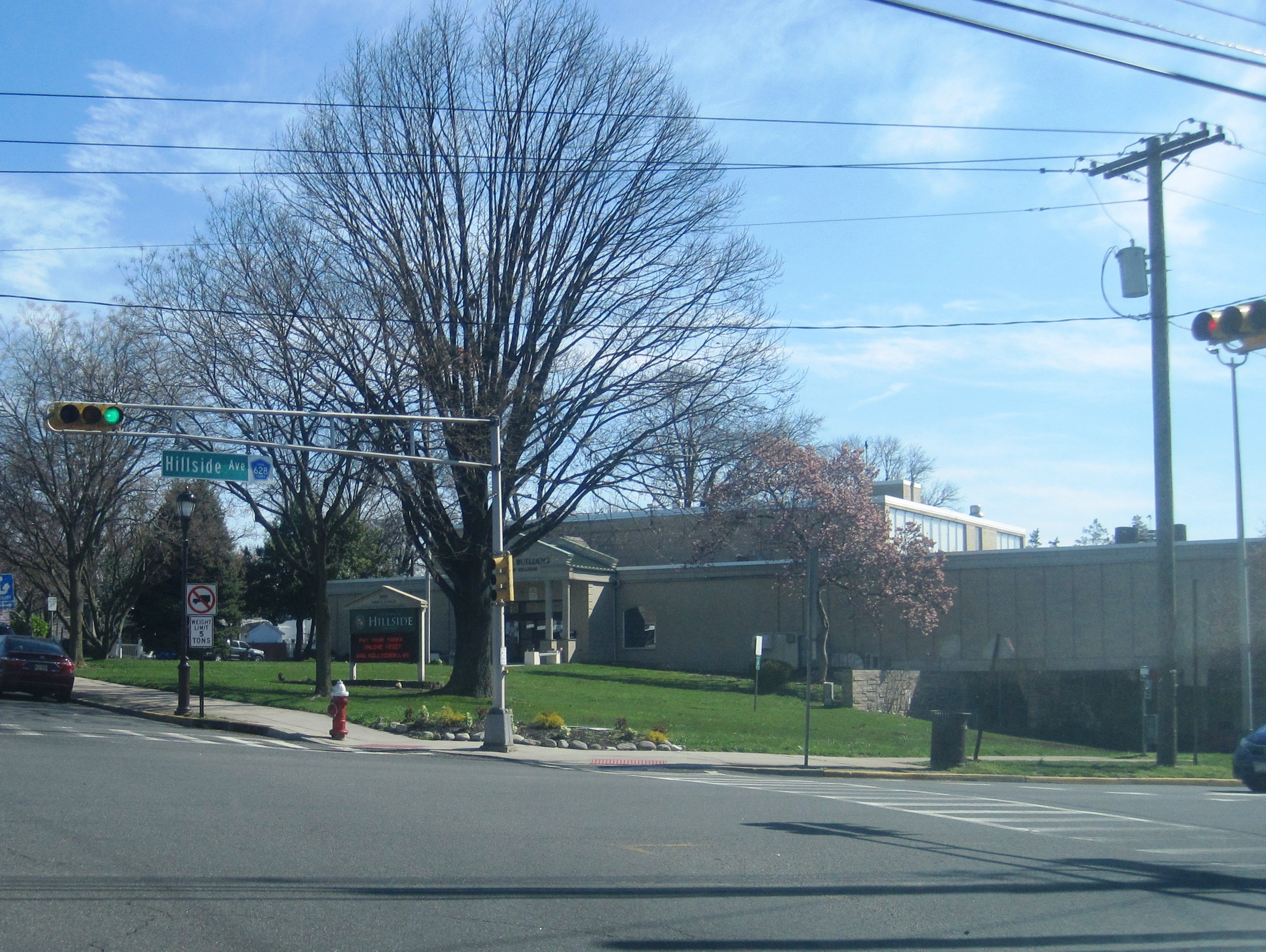
Hillside Municipal Building

Hillside is governed by the Faulkner Act (formally known as the Optional Municipal Charter Law), under the Mayor-Council form of New Jersey municipal government (plan 4), as implemented as of July 1, 1997. The township is one of 71 municipalities (of the 564) statewide that use this form of government. The governing body is comprised of the mayor and the seven-member Township Council, all elected to four-year terms of office on a non-partisan basis as part of the November general election in odd-numbered years. Four council members come from wards, and three are elected at-large. The four ward seats all come up for election together and the mayoral and at-large seats come up for vote together two years later. In August 2010, the council voted to shift municipal elections from May to November, to be held in conjunction with the general election.

As of 2026, the Mayor of Hillside is Andrea Hyatt, whose term of office ends December 31, 2029. Members of the Township Council are Council President Angela Garretson (Ward 2, 2027), Lisa Bonanno (At-large, 2029), George Cook III (Ward 1, appointed to an unexpired term ending 2027), Armando DaSilva (At-large, 2029), David Feuerstein (Ward 4, 2027), Daryl Joyner (Ward 3, 2027), and Calvert Lofton (At-large, 2029).

In the 2017 general election, none of the candidates for mayor or at-large council seats crossed the 50% threshold, leading to a December run-off between Dahlia Vertreese and Jorge A. Batista, the two top candidates for mayor, and the top six for council, consisting of the three-person slates affiliated with the two mayoral candidates. The runoff was won by Vertreese and her slate.

=== Federal, state and county representation ===
Hillside is located in the 10th Congressional District and is part of New Jersey's 28th state legislative district.

For the 119th United States Congress, New Jersey's 10th congressional district is represented by LaMonica McIver (D, Newark). New Jersey is represented in the United States Senate by Democrats Cory Booker (Newark, term ends 2027) and Andy Kim (Moorestown, term ends 2031).

For the 2026–2027 session, the 28th legislative district of the New Jersey Legislature is represented in the State Senate by Renee Burgess (D, Irvington) and in the General Assembly by Chigozie Onyema (D, Newark) and Cleopatra Tucker (D, Newark).

Union County is governed by a Board of County Commissioners, whose nine members are elected at-large to three-year terms of office on a staggered basis with three seats coming up for election each year, with an appointed County Manager overseeing the day-to-day operations of the county. At an annual reorganization meeting held in the beginning of January, the board selects a Chair and Vice Chair from among its members. As of 2026, Union County's County Commissioners are:

Vice Chair Rebecca Williams (D, Plainfield, 2028), Chairman Joesph Bodek (D, Linden, 2026), James E. Baker Jr. (D, Rahway, 2027), Michele Delisfort (D, Union Township, 2026), Lourdes M. Leon (D, Elizabeth, 2026), Alexander Mirabella (D, Fanwood, 2027) Kimberly Palmieri-Mouded (D, Westfield, 2027). Stanley J. Neron (D, Elizabeth, 2028), Joseph Signorello III (D, Roselle Park, 2028)

Constitutional officers elected on a countywide basis are: Clerk Vacant - Incumbent Clerk Joanne Rajoppi (D, Union Township) died on July 16, 2026. Her death triggered a special election for a full five-year term to be held concurrently with the November 2026 general election. Deputy Clerk Clara Fernández assumes the powers of the office until the vacancy is filled. Sheriff Peter Corvelli (D, Kenilworth, 2026) and Surrogate Christopher E. Hudak (D, Clark, 2027).

=== Politics ===
In March 2011, there were 11,991 registered voters in Hillside Township, of whom 6,196 (51.7% vs. 41.8% countywide) were registered as Democrats, 685 (5.7% vs. 15.3%) were registered as Republicans and 5,109 (42.6% vs. 42.9%) were registered as Unaffiliated. There was one voter registered to other parties. Among the township's 2010 Census population, 56.0% (vs. 53.3% in Union County) were registered to vote, including 73.4% of those ages 18 and over (vs. 70.6% countywide).

Gubernatorial election results for Hillside
Year	Republican		Democratic		Third party(ies)	
Year	No.	%	No.	%	No.	%
2025	1,229	17.26%	5,835	81.94%	57	0.80%
2021	914	17.60%	4,229	81.45%	49	0.94%
2017	678	13.26%	4,381	85.65%	56	1.09%
2013	1,564	31.55%	3,362	67.82%	31	0.63%
2009	1,085	19.89%	4,236	77.65%	134	2.46%
2005	860	16.78%	4,176	81.48%	89	1.74%

In the 2012 presidential election, Democrat Barack Obama received 8,059 votes (86.4% vs. 66.0% countywide), ahead of Republican Mitt Romney with 1,186 votes (12.7% vs. 32.3%) and other candidates with 23 votes (0.2% vs. 0.8%), among the 9,323 ballots cast by the township's 12,982 registered voters, for a turnout of 71.8% (vs. 68.8% in Union County). In the 2008 presidential election, Democrat Barack Obama received 7,908 votes (83.3% vs. 63.1% countywide), ahead of Republican John McCain with 1,491 votes (15.7% vs. 35.2%) and other candidates with 33 votes (0.3% vs. 0.9%), among the 9,492 ballots cast by the township's 12,766 registered voters, for a turnout of 74.4% (vs. 74.7% in Union County). In the 2004 presidential election, Democrat John Kerry received 6,415 votes (77.7% vs. 58.3% countywide), ahead of Republican George W. Bush with 1,737 votes (21.0% vs. 40.3%) and other candidates with 41 votes (0.5% vs. 0.7%), among the 8,257 ballots cast by the township's 11,702 registered voters, for a turnout of 70.6% (vs. 72.3% in the whole county).

United States presidential election results for Hillside
Year	Republican		Democratic		Third party(ies)	
Year	No.	%	No.	%	No.	%
2024	2,194	23.93%	6,846	74.66%	129	1.41%
2020	1,766	17.57%	8,225	81.83%	60	0.60%
2016	1,300	14.34%	7,663	84.53%	102	1.13%
2012	1,186	12.80%	8,059	86.96%	23	0.25%
2008	1,491	15.81%	7,908	83.84%	33	0.35%
2004	1,737	21.20%	6,415	78.30%	41	0.50%

In the 2017 gubernatorial election, Democrat Phil Murphy received 4,381 votes (85.7% vs. 65.2% countywide), ahead of Republican Kim Guadagno with 678 votes (13.3% vs. 32.6%), and other candidates with 56 votes (1.1% vs. 2.1%), among the 5,488 ballots cast by the township's 13,660 registered voters, for a turnout of 40.2%. In the 2013 gubernatorial election, Democrat Barbara Buono received 67.8% of the vote (3,362 cast), ahead of Republican Chris Christie with 31.6% (1,564 votes), and other candidates with 0.6% (31 votes), among the 5,370 ballots cast by the township's 12,816 registered voters (413 ballots were spoiled), for a turnout of 41.9%. In the 2009 gubernatorial election, Democrat Jon Corzine received 4,236 ballots cast (77.1% vs. 50.6% countywide), ahead of Republican Chris Christie with 1,085 votes (19.8% vs. 41.7%), Independent Chris Daggett with 102 votes (1.9% vs. 5.9%) and other candidates with 32 votes (0.6% vs. 0.8%), among the 5,492 ballots cast by the township's 12,413 registered voters, yielding a 44.2% turnout (vs. 46.5% in the county).

United States Senate election results for Hillside1
Year	Republican		Democratic		Third party(ies)	
Year	No.	%	No.	%	No.	%
2024	1,779	21.41%	6,348	76.40%	182	2.19%
2018	899	13.35%	5,456	81.00%	381	5.66%
2012	879	10.93%	7,101	88.33%	59	0.73%
2006	849	18.21%	3,754	80.51%	60	1.29%

United States Senate election results for Hillside2
Year	Republican		Democratic		Third party(ies)	
Year	No.	%	No.	%	No.	%
2020	1,484	15.08%	8,221	83.55%	135	1.37%
2014	522	12.08%	3,743	86.60%	57	1.32%
2013	475	13.35%	3,050	85.72%	33	0.93%
2008	1,113	14.72%	6,346	83.93%	102	1.35%

== Education ==
The Hillside Public Schools serve students in pre-kindergarten through twelfth grade. As of the 2023–24 school year, the district, comprised of seven schools, had an enrollment of 3,046 students and 257.8 classroom teachers (on an FTE basis), for a student–teacher ratio of 11.8:1. Schools in the district (with 2023–24 enrollment data from the National Center for Education Statistics) are Abram P. Morris Early Childhood Center with 664 students in grades PreK–1, Ola Edwards Community School with 394 students in grades 2–6, Hurden Looker School with 393 students in grades 2–6, Deanna G. Taylor Academy with 191 students in grades 2–6, Hillside Innovation Academy with 101 students in grades 7–8, Walter O. Krumbiegel Middle School with 309 students in grades 7–8 and Hillside High School with 927 students in grades 9–12.

Catholic grammar schools included Christ the King on Columbia Avenue and St. Catherine of Siena School in Elizabeth on North Broad Street until the two were merged in 2004 to form Hillside Catholic Academy with the students from both schools together at the facility on Bloy Street. The school was one of eight closed by the Roman Catholic Archdiocese of Newark at the end of the 2011–2012 school year, in the face of declining enrollment and rising expenses, part of a long-term reduction in the number of schools in the archdiocese, which had dropped to 112 from the 176 schools systemwide a decade earlier.

A portion of Kean University is located in the Westminster section of Hillside, on the grounds of the former site of the Pingry School.

== Transportation ==
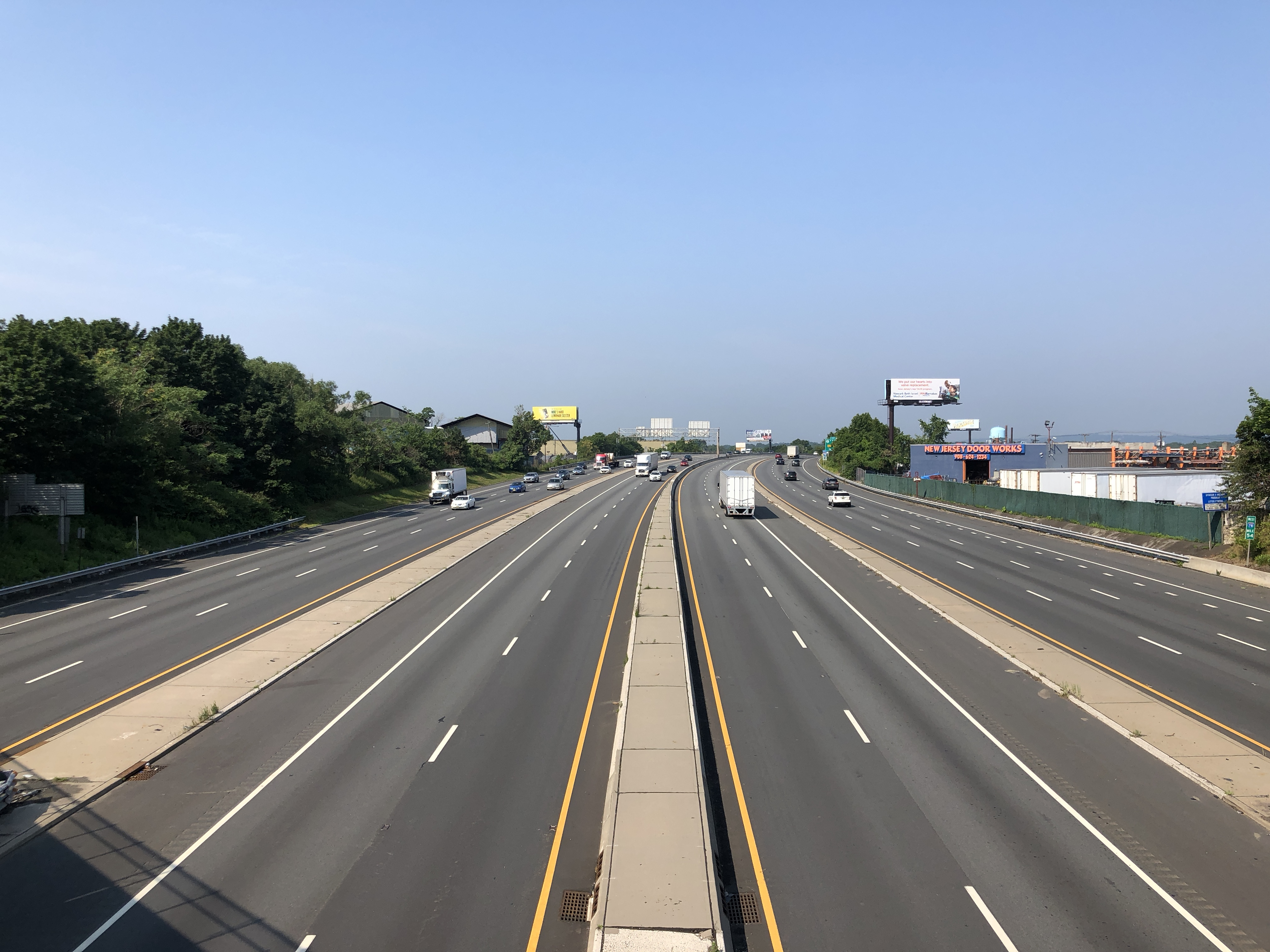
I-78 westbound in Hillside

=== Roads and highways ===
As of May 2010, the township had a total of 48.48 miles (78.02 km) of roadways, of which 38.72 miles (62.31 km) were maintained by the municipality, 5.57 miles (8.96 km) by Union County, 3.47 miles (5.58 km) by the New Jersey Department of Transportation and 0.72 miles (1.16 km) by the New Jersey Turnpike Authority.

The Garden State Parkway, I-78, US 22, Route 439 and County Route 509 all pass through Hillside. The Union toll plaza of the Garden State Parkway is located on the northbound lanes of the parkway, approaching the exit for I-78.

=== Public transportation ===
NJ Transit offers bus service to the Port Authority Bus Terminal in New York City on the 113 and 114 routes and to other New Jersey points. There is one train line that passes through the township but there are no stations. The Irvington Industrial Branch of the Lehigh Valley Railroad (now Conrail Shared Assets) breaks off of the mainline to serve several industries. The closest train stations are Union station in Union, and North Elizabeth station in Elizabeth.

Newark Airport is approximately 2 miles (3.2 km) east of Hillside.

== Notable people ==
People who were born in, residents of, or otherwise closely associated with Hillside include:

- William Bendix (1908–1964), actor (Lifeboat, Life of Riley), lived here in the 1930s
- Neil Best, sports media journalist for Newsday
- Nahree Biggins (born 2001), running back for the Hamilton Tiger-Cats of the Canadian Football League
- Clint Bolick (born 1957), associate justice of the Arizona Supreme Court
- Marquis Cunningham (born 1989), finalist on So You Think You Can Dance
- Michael V. Gazzo (1923–1995), playwright (A Hatful of Rain) and Academy Award-nominated film actor (The Godfather Part II)
- David Jones (born 1968), former NFL tight end who played for the Los Angeles Raiders in 1992
- Marc Leepson (born 1945), journalist and historian
- Kyle Lofton (born 1999), college basketball player for the St. Bonaventure Bonnies
- Rollie Massimino (1934–2017), college basketball coach, led Villanova to 1985 NCAA Men's Division I Basketball Championship
- Jerron McMillian (born 1989), NFL safety for the Green Bay Packers
- Mr. Len (Leonard "Lenny" Smythe), hip-hop artist, former member of underground group Company Flow, current member Roosevelt Franklin
- Adrienne A. Mandel (born 1936), politician who represented the 19th District in the Maryland House of Delegates for more than ten years
- Jamar McGloster (born 1995), professional gridiron football offensive tackle for the Montreal Alouettes of the Canadian Football League
- Xavier Munford (born 1992), basketball player for Hapoel Tel Aviv of the Israeli Basketball Premier League
- Kendall Ogle (born 1976), 1999 draft pick of NFL's Cleveland Browns
- Robert Parham (born 1966), kickboxing former World Kickboxing Champion and actor
- Alan Paul (born 1949), member of The Manhattan Transfer
- Rachid (born 1979), singer-songwriter and music producer
- Tab Ramos (born 1966), footballer and member of the United States' 1990 and 1994 World Cup teams; Hillside was childhood home
- Nicholas Reale (1922–1984), watercolorist with a lengthy career in art and teaching
- Phil Rizzuto (1917–2007), Hall of Fame baseball player and broadcaster; longtime Hillside resident
- Jon Sarkin (1953–2024), self-taught contemporary artist
- Arthur Seale (born 1946), serving life sentence for 1980s kidnapping, murder of Exxon oil executive Sidney Reso
- Ralph H. Spanjer (1920–1999), U.S. Marine Corps major general
- Marquis Spruill (born 1991), football linebacker
- Dan Studney (born 1941), former track and field athlete who competed in the javelin throw, winning a gold medal for the United States at the 1963 Pan American Games
- Tame One (born 1970 as Rahem Brown), hip-hop artist and member of supergroup The Weathermen
- Jeff Tittel, environmentalist who spent more than two decades as the director of the New Jersey Sierra Club
- Brian Ugwu (born 2000), defensive lineman for the Hamilton Tiger-Cats of the Canadian Football League
- UNIIQU3 (stage name of Cherise Alexandria Gary), music producer and Jersey club artist
- Harry Wilf (1921–1992), co-founder of the real estate development firm Garden Homes
- Joseph Wilf (1925–2016), co-founder of the real estate development firm Garden Homes
- Zygi Wilf (born 1950), real estate developer, principal owner of NFL's Minnesota Vikings, younger brother Mark Wilf (born 1962), president of the Vikings and cousin Leonard Wilf (born 1947), the team's vice chairman
- Hela Young (1950–2002), Miss New Jersey 1971, former New Jersey Lottery host
- Dick Zimmer (born 1944), former member of the United States House of Representatives, Republican candidate for United States Senate in 1996 and 2008

== Evergreen Cemetery ==
Hillside is the site of Evergreen Cemetery, known locally as the burial site of many Roma (or Gypsy) families and a number of notable writers, including:

- Stephen Crane, author of The Red Badge of Courage
- Mary Mapes Dodge, author of Hans Brinker or The Silver Skates
- Edward Stratemeyer, creator of the Hardy Boys, Bobbsey Twins, Nancy Drew, Rover Boys, and Tom Swift series, among others

== Pop culture ==
- Hip hop artist Lauryn Hill mentions Hillside on her album The Miseducation of Lauryn Hill. In the song "Every Ghetto, Every City," in which she describes her experiences growing up in New Jersey, she raps, "Hillside brings beef with the cops."
- The 1978 film King of the Gypsies was filmed in part in Hillside.
- The Rat Slayer of Hillside, NJ, a documentary about Hillside resident Frank Balun who was charged for killing a rat, features the township.
