= Hillside School District =

Hillside School District may refer to:

- Hillside Elementary School District in Arizona
- Hillside School District 93 in Illinois
- Hillside Public Schools in New Jersey
