= 2014 Atlanta Falcons season =

NFL team season

- Owner: Arthur Blank
- General manager: Thomas Dimitroff
- Head coach: Mike Smith
- Home stadium: Georgia Dome

Results
- Record: 6–10
- Division place: 3rd NFC South
- Playoffs: Did not qualify
- Pro Bowlers: WR/RS Devin Hester; WR Julio Jones; QB Matt Ryan

The 2014 season was the Atlanta Falcons' 49th in the National Football League (NFL), and their seventh and final season under head coach Mike Smith. The Falcons were defeated by the Carolina Panthers in week 17, officially eliminating them from postseason contention for the second straight year. As a result, Smith was fired after his seventh year as head coach, after two straight years with a losing record.

The 2014 Atlanta Falcons were featured on the HBO documentary series Hard Knocks.

== 2014 draft class ==
2014 Atlanta Falcons Draft
Round	Selection	Player	Position	College
1	6	Jake Matthews	Offensive tackle	Texas A&M
2	37	Ra'Shede Hageman	Defensive tackle	Minnesota
3	68	Dezmen Southward	Free safety	Wisconsin
4	103	Devonta Freeman	Running back	Florida State
4	139	Prince Shembo	Linebacker	Notre Dame
5	147	Ricardo Allen	Cornerback	Purdue
5	168	Marquis Spruill	Linebacker	Syracuse
6	None — see below			
7	253	Yawin Smallwood	Linebacker	Connecticut
7	255	Tyler Starr	Linebacker	South Dakota

Compensatory selection

- Note: The Falcons traded their sixth- (No. 182 overall) and original seventh- (No. 220 overall) round selections to the Minnesota Vikings in exchange for the Vikings' fifth-round selection (No. 168 overall).

== Staff ==
2014 Atlanta Falcons staff
Front office: Owner/chairman – Arthur Blank; President/CEO – Rich McKay; General manager – Thomas Dimitroff; Assistant general manager – Scott Pioli; Director of player personnel – Lionel Vital; Director of football administration – Nick Polk; Director of pro scouting – DeJuan Polk; Director of college scouting – Steve Sabo; Head coaches: Head coach – Mike Smith; Assistant head coach/wide receivers – Terry Robiskie; Offensive coaches: Offensive coordinator – Dirk Koetter; Quarterbacks – Glenn Thomas; Running backs – Gerald Brown; Tight ends – Chris Scelfo; Offensive line – Mike Tice; Assistant offensive line – Wade Harman; Offensive assistant – Andrew Weidinger	Defensive coaches: Defensive coordinator – Mike Nolan; Defensive line – Bryan Cox; Inside linebackers – Glenn Pires; Outside linebackers – Mark Collins; Defensive backs – Joe Danna; Secondary – Tim Lewis; Defensive assistant – Andrew Thacker; Special teams coaches: Special teams coordinator – Keith Armstrong; Assistant special teams – Eric Sutulovich; Strength and conditioning: Head strength and conditioning – A.J. Neibel; Strength and conditioning assistant – Jonas Beauchemin

== Final roster ==
2014 Atlanta Falcons roster
Quarterbacks (QB): 12 Sean Renfree; 2 Matt Ryan; 13 T. J. Yates; Running backs (RB): 42 Patrick DiMarco FB; 24 Devonta Freeman; 39 Steven Jackson; 32 Jacquizz Rodgers; 34 Jerome Smith; Wide receivers (WR): 19 Drew Davis; 83 Harry Douglas; 17 Devin Hester RS; 11 Julio Jones; 14 Eric Weems; 84 Roddy White; Tight ends (TE): 86 Bear Pascoe; 80 Levine Toilolo	Offensive linemen (OL): 75 Jon Asamoah G; 63 Justin Blalock G; 68 Gabe Carimi T/G; 69 Harland Gunn G; 70 Jake Matthews T; 73 Ryan Schraeder T; 64 Jonathan Scott T; 62 James Stone C; Defensive linemen (DL): 95 Jonathan Babineaux DE; 93 Malliciah Goodman DE; 77 Ra'Shede Hageman DT; 99 Tyson Jackson DE; 90 Stansly Maponga DE; 94 Jonathan Massaquoi DE; 98 Cliff Matthews DE; 91 Corey Peters DT; 96 Paul Soliai DT; 50 Osi Umenyiora DE	Linebackers (LB): 59 Joplo Bartu OLB; 71 Kroy Biermann OLB; 53 Prince Shembo OLB; 54 Tyler Starr OLB; 52 Nate Stupar MLB; 55 Paul Worrilow MLB; Defensive backs (DB): 37 Ricardo Allen CB; 28 Javier Arenas CB; 29 Sean Baker SS; 30 Charles Godfrey SS; 36 Kemal Ishmael SS; 20 Dwight Lowery FS; 27 Robert McClain CB; 41 Dezmen Southward FS; 21 Desmond Trufant CB; 26 Josh Wilson CB; Special teams (ST): 5 Matt Bosher P; 3 Matt Bryant K; 47 Josh Harris LS	Practice squad: 40 Brandan Bishop S; 74 Reid Fragel T; 92 Ricky Havili-Heimuli DT; 43 Jordan Mabin CB; 18 Freddie Martino WR; 85 Kyle Miller TE; 89 Bernard Reedy WR; 67 Adam Replogle G; 45 Jacques Smith LB; 33 Ronnie Wingo RB; Reserve: 23 Robert Alford CB (IR); 72 Sam Baker T (IR); 61 Joe Hawley C (IR); 76 Lamar Holmes T (IR); 79 Mike Johnson G/T (IR); 66 Peter Konz C (IR); 25 William Moore S (IR); 22 Zeke Motta S (PUP); 35 Antone Smith RB (IR); 51 Marquis Spruill LB (IR); 56 Sean Weatherspoon LB (IR); Rookies in italics 53 active, 11 reserve, 10 practice squad

== Schedule ==
=== Preseason ===
Week	Date	Opponent	Result	Record	Venue	Recap
1	August 8	Miami Dolphins	**W** 16–10	1–0	Georgia Dome	Recap
2	August 16	at Houston Texans	**L** 7–32	1–1	NRG Stadium	Recap
3	August 23	Tennessee Titans	**L** 17–24	1–2	Georgia Dome	Recap
4	August 28	at Jacksonville Jaguars	**W** 24–14	2–2	EverBank Field	Recap

=== Regular season ===
Week	Date	Opponent	Result	Record	Venue	Recap
1	September 7	**New Orleans Saints**	**W** 37–34 (OT)	1–0	Georgia Dome	Recap
2	September 14	at Cincinnati Bengals	**L** 10–24	1–1	Paul Brown Stadium	Recap
3	September 18	**Tampa Bay Buccaneers**	**W** 56–14	2–1	Georgia Dome	Recap
4	September 28	at Minnesota Vikings	**L** 28–41	2–2	TCF Bank Stadium	Recap
5	October 5	at New York Giants	**L** 20–30	2–3	MetLife Stadium	Recap
6	October 12	Chicago Bears	**L** 13–27	2–4	Georgia Dome	Recap
7	October 19	at Baltimore Ravens	**L** 7–29	2–5	M&T Bank Stadium	Recap
8	October 26	Detroit Lions	**L** 21–22	2–6	(United Kingdom) Wembley Stadium (London)	Recap
9	Bye					
10	November 9	at **Tampa Bay Buccaneers**	**W** 27–17	3–6	Raymond James Stadium	Recap
11	November 16	at **Carolina Panthers**	**W** 19–17	4–6	Bank of America Stadium	Recap
12	November 23	Cleveland Browns	**L** 24–26	4–7	Georgia Dome	Recap
13	November 30	Arizona Cardinals	**W** 29–18	5–7	Georgia Dome	Recap
14	December 8	at Green Bay Packers	**L** 37–43	5–8	Lambeau Field	Recap
15	December 14	Pittsburgh Steelers	**L** 20–27	5–9	Georgia Dome	Recap
16	December 21	at **New Orleans Saints**	**W** 30–14	6–9	Mercedes-Benz Superdome	Recap
17	December 28	**Carolina Panthers**	**L** 3–34	6–10	Georgia Dome	Recap

Note: Intra-division opponents are in bold text.

=== Game summaries ===
==== Week 1: vs. New Orleans Saints ====
Week One: New Orleans Saints at Atlanta Falcons – Game summary

Quarter	1	2	3	4	OT	Total
Saints	6	14	0	14	0	**34**
**Falcons**	0	10	14	10	3	**37**

at Georgia Dome, Atlanta, Georgia

- Date: September 7
- Game time: 1:00 p.m. EDT
- Game weather: Played indoors (dome stadium)
- Game attendance: 70,706
- Referee: Bill Leavy
- TV announcers (Fox): Kevin Burkhardt, John Lynch and Pam Oliver
- Recap, Gamebook

Game information

**First quarter**

- NO – Shayne Graham 31-yard field goal, 10:33. Saints 3–0. **Drive: 9 plays, 67 yards, 4:27.**
- NO – Shayne Graham 50-yard field goal, 4:39. Saints 6–0. **Drive: 10 plays, 28 yards, 3:59.**

**Second quarter**

- NO – Khiry Robinson 2-yard run (Shayne Graham kick), 11:46. Saints 13–0. **Drive: 9 plays, 80 yards, 4:10.**
- ATL – Roddy White 2-yard pass from Matt Ryan (Matt Bryant kick), 4:06. Saints 13–7. **Drive: 14 plays, 80 yards, 7:40.**
- NO – Brandin Cooks 3-yard pass from Drew Brees (Shayne Graham kick), 0:20. Saints 20–7. **Drive: 9 plays, 80 yards, 3:46.**
- ATL – Matt Bryant 40-yard field goal, 0:00. Saints 20–10. **Drive: 3 plays, 58 yards, 0:20.**

**Third quarter**

- ATL – Levine Toilolo 1-yard pass from Matt Ryan (Matt Bryant kick), 9:22. Saints 20–17. **Drive: 12 plays, 80 yards, 5:38.**
- ATL – Antone Smith 54-yard pass from Matt Ryan (Matt Bryant kick), 0:21. Falcons 24–20. **Drive: 5 plays, 80 yards, 2:31.**

**Fourth quarter**

- NO – Mark Ingram 3-yard run (Shayne Graham kick), 8:46. Saints 27–24. **Drive: 12 plays, 80 yards, 6:35.**
- ATL – Jacquizz Rodgers 17-yard run (Matt Bryant kick), 2:50. Falcons 31–27. **Drive: 8 plays, 94 yards, 3:26.**
- NO – Mark Ingram 3-yard run (Shayne Graham kick), 1:20. Saints 34–31. **Drive: 8 plays, 71 yards, 1:30.**
- ATL – Matt Bryant 51-yard field goal, 0:00. Tied 34–34. **Drive: 8 plays, 47 yards, 1:20.**

**Overtime**

- ATL – Matt Bryant 52-yard field goal, 13:17. Falcons 37–34. **Drive: 4 plays, 4 yards, 1:32.**

**Top passers**

- NO – Drew Brees – 29/42, 333 yards, TD, INT
- ATL – Matt Ryan – 31/43, 448 yards, 3 TD

**Top rushers**

- NO – Mark Ingram - 13 rushes, 60 yards, 2 TD
- ATL – Steven Jackson – 12 rushes, 52 yards

**Top receivers**

- NO – Marques Colston - 5 receptions, 110 yards
- ATL – Julio Jones - 7 receptions, 116 yards

==== Week 2: at Cincinnati Bengals ====
Week Two: Atlanta Falcons at Cincinnati Bengals – Game summary

Quarter	1	2	3	4	Total
Falcons	3	0	0	7	**10**
**Bengals**	3	7	14	0	**24**

at Paul Brown Stadium, Cincinnati, Ohio

- Date: September 14
- Game time: 1:00 p.m. EDT
- Game weather: 66 °F (19 °C), cloudy
- Game attendance: 58,574
- Referee: Bill Vinovich
- TV announcers (CBS): Kevin Harlan and Rich Gannon
- Recap, Gamebook

Game information

**First quarter**

- CIN – Mike Nugent 31-yard field goal, 5:19. Bengals 3–0. **Drive: 13 plays, 69 yards, 5:57.**
- ATL – Matt Bryant 46-yard field goal, 1:08. Tied 3–3. **Drive: 9 plays, 40 yards, 4:11.**

**Second quarter**

- CIN – Giovani Bernard 4-yard run (Mike Nugent kick), 2:11. Bengals 10–3. **Drive: 10 plays, 91 yards, 5:21.**

**Third quarter**

- CIN – Mohamed Sanu 76-yard pass from Andy Dalton (Mike Nugent kick), 10:58. Bengals 17–3. **Drive: 3 plays, 80 yards, 1:12.**
- CIN – Jeremy Hill 1-yard run (Mike Nugent kick), 6:28. Bengals 24–3. **Drive: 8 plays, 43 yards, 4:14.**

**Fourth quarter**

- ATL – Julio Jones 14-yard pass from Matt Ryan (Matt Bryant kick), 8:35. Bengals 24–10. **Drive: 10 plays, 77 yards, 3:59.**

**Top passers**

- ATL – Matt Ryan – 24/44, 231 yards, TD, 3 INT
- CIN – Andy Dalton – 15/23, 252 yards, TD

**Top rushers**

- ATL – Steven Jackson – 11 rushes, 46 yards
- CIN – Giovani Bernard – 27 rushes, 90 yards, TD

**Top receivers**

- ATL – Julio Jones – 7 receptions, 88 yards, TD
- CIN – Mohamed Sanu – 3 receptions, 84 yards, TD

==== Week 3: vs. Tampa Bay Buccaneers ====
Week Three: Tampa Bay Buccaneers at Atlanta Falcons – Game summary

Quarter	1	2	3	4	Total
Buccaneers	0	0	0	14	**14**
**Falcons**	21	14	21	0	**56**

at Georgia Dome, Atlanta, Georgia

- Date: September 18
- Game time: 8:25 p.m. EDT
- Game weather: Played indoors (dome stadium)
- Game attendance: 70,318
- Referee: Craig Wrolstad
- TV announcers (CBS/NFLN): Jim Nantz, Phil Simms and Tracy Wolfson
- Recap, Gamebook

Game information

**First quarter**

- ATL – Harry Douglas 3-yard pass from Matt Ryan (Matt Bryant kick), 12:03. Falcons 7–0. **Drive: 6 plays, 70 yards, 2:57.**
- ATL – Julio Jones 8-yard pass from Matt Ryan (Matt Bryant kick), 3:03. Falcons 14–0. **Drive: 8 plays, 37 yards, 4:14.**
- ATL – Kemal Ishmael 23-yard interception return (Matt Bryant kick), 2:33. Falcons 21–0.

**Second quarter**

- ATL – Devin Hester 20-yard run (Matt Bryant kick), 14:53.Falcons 28–0. **Drive: 4 plays, 35 yards, 1:55.**
- ATL – Devin Hester 62-yard punt return (Matt Bryant kick), 7:06. Falcons 35–0.

**Third quarter**

- ATL – Julio Jones 40-yard pass from Matt Ryan (Matt Bryant kick), 8:23. Falcons 42–0. **Drive: 5 plays, 82 yards, 2:39.**
- ATL – Steven Jackson 2-yard run (Matt Bryant kick), 8:11. Falcons 49–0. **Drive: 1 play, 2 yards, 0:07.**
- ATL – Antone Smith 38-yard run (Matt Bryant kick), 1:47. Falcons 56–0. **Drive: 5 plays, 80 yards, 3:12.**

**Fourth quarter**

- TB – Vincent Jackson 3-yard pass from Mike Glennon (Patrick Murray kick), 8:46. Falcons 56–7. **Drive: 15 plays, 80 yards, 8:01.**
- TB – Danny Lansanah 27-yard interception return (Patrick Murray kick), 7:07. Falcons 56–14.

**Top passers**

- TB – Mike Glennon – 17/24, 121 yards, TD
- ATL – Matt Ryan – 21/24, 286 yards, 3 TD

**Top rushers**

- TB – Bobby Rainey – 11 rushes, 41 yards
- ATL – Steven Jackson – 14 rushes, 54 yards, TD

**Top receivers**

- TB – Bobby Rainey – 7 receptions, 64 yards
- ATL – Julio Jones – 9 receptions, 161 yards, 2 TD

In this game, Devin Hester would break Deion Sanders's all-time record for punt/kick returns for touchdowns, with 20. This was the first NFC vs. NFC game to air on CBS since the 1993 NFL season.

==== Week 4: at Minnesota Vikings ====
Week Four: Atlanta Falcons at Minnesota Vikings – Game summary

Quarter	1	2	3	4	Total
Falcons	7	7	14	0	**28**
**Vikings**	14	10	3	14	**41**

at TCF Bank Stadium, Minneapolis, Minnesota

- Date: September 28
- Game time: 4:25 p.m. EDT/3:25 p.m. CDT
- Game weather: 82 °F (28 °C), partly cloudy
- Game attendance: 52,173
- Referee: Ron Torbert
- TV announcers (Fox): Chris Myers, Ronde Barber and Jennifer Hale
- Recap, Gamebook

Game information

**First quarter**

- MIN – Matt Asiata 3-yard run (Blair Walsh kick), 9:27. Vikings 7–0. **Drive: 8 plays, 73 yards, 4:31.**
- ATL – Roddy White 24-yard pass from Matt Ryan (Matt Bryant kick), 3:56. Tied 7–7. **Drive: 11 plays, 80 yards, 5:31.**
- MIN – Matt Asiata 3-yard run (Blair Walsh kick), 1:31. Vikings 14–7. **Drive: 5 plays, 53 yards, 2:25.**

**Second quarter**

- ATL – Patrick DiMarco 1-yard pass from Matt Ryan (Matt Bryant kick), 5:56. Tied 14–14. **Drive: 13 plays, 60 yards, 5:26.**
- MIN – Teddy Bridgewater 13-yard run (Blair Walsh kick), 1:59. Vikings 21–14. **Drive: 9 plays, 80 yards, 3:57.**
- MIN – Blair Walsh 18-yard field goal, 0:02. Vikings 24–14. **Drive: 10 plays, 84 yards, 1:23.**

**Third quarter**

- MIN – Blair Walsh 41-yard field goal, 10:40. Vikings 27–14. **Drive: 8 plays, 43 yards, 4:20.**
- ATL – Devin Hester 36-yard pass from Matt Ryan (Matt Bryant kick), 7:19. Vikings 27–21. **Drive: 7 plays, 80 yards, 3:21.**
- ATL – Antone Smith 48-yard run (Matt Bryant kick), 1:31. Falcons 28–27. **Drive: 4 plays, 63 yards, 1:16.**

**Fourth quarter**

- MIN – Matt Asiata 1-yard run (Teddy Bridewater-Rhett Ellison pass), 10:50. Vikings 35–28. **Drive: 9 plays, 78 yards, 3:51.**
- MIN – Blair Walsh 55-yard field goal, 3:38. Vikings 38–28. **Drive: 5 plays, 18 yards, 2:51.**
- MIN – Blair Walsh 33-yard field goal, 1:14. Vikings 41–28. **Drive: 7 plays, 15 yards, 2:11.**

**Top passers**

- ATL – Matt Ryan – 25/41, 298 yards, 3 TD, 2 INT
- MIN – Teddy Bridgewater – 19/30, 317 yards

**Top rushers**

- ATL – Antone Smith – 4 rushes, 62 yards, TD
- MIN – Jerick McKinnon – 18 rushes, 135 yards

Top receivers

- ATL – Julio Jones – 6 receptions, 82 yards
- MIN – Jarius Wright – 8 receptions, 132 yards

==== Week 5: at New York Giants ====
Week Five: Atlanta Falcons at New York Giants – Game summary

Quarter	1	2	3	4	Total
Falcons	7	6	7	0	**20**
**Giants**	7	3	7	13	**30**

at MetLife Stadium, East Rutherford, New Jersey

- Date: October 5
- Game time: 1:00 p.m. EDT
- Game weather: 55 °F (13 °C), sunny
- Game attendance: 80,307
- Referee: Ed Hochuli
- TV announcers (Fox): Kevin Burkhardt, John Lynch and Pam Oliver
- Recap, Gamebook

Game information

**First quarter**

- NYG – Rueben Randle 3-yard pass from Eli Manning (Josh Brown kick), 6:40. Giants 7–0. **Drive: 11 plays, 83 yards, 5:06.**
- ATL – Steven Jackson 10-yard run (Matt Bryant kick), 1:57. Tied 7–7. **Drive: 9 plays, 80 yards, 4:43.**

**Second quarter**

- ATL – Matt Bryant 20-yard field goal, 14:15. Falcons 10–7. **Drive: 6 plays, 18 yards, 2:33.**
- NYG – Josh Brown 49-yard field goal, 3:40. Tied 10–10. **Drive: 9 plays, 50 yards, 5:13.**
- ATL – Matt Bryant 20-yard field goal, 0:03. Falcons 13–10. **Drive: 11 plays, 73 yards, 3:37.**

**Third quarter**

- ATL – Antone Smith 74-yard pass from Matt Ryan (Matt Bryant kick), 5:37. Falcons 20–10. **Drive: 3 plays, 80 yards, 1:20.**
- NYG – Andre Williams 3-yard run (Josh Brown kick), 2:05. Falcons 20–17. **Drive: 9 plays, 81 yards, 3:32.**

**Fourth quarter**

- NYG – Odell Beckham Jr. 3-yard pass from Eli Manning (Josh Brown kick), 10:02. Giants 24–20. **Drive: 11 plays, 64 yards, 5:22.**
- NYG – Josh Brown 50-yard field goal, 5:01. Giants 27–20. **Drive: 7 plays, 24 yards, 3:22.**
- NYG – Josh Brown 26-yard field goal, 2:08. Giants 30–20. **Drive: 7 plays, 10 yards, 2:26.**

**Top passers**

- ATL – Matt Ryan – 29/45, 316 yards, TD, INT
- NYG – Eli Manning – 19/30, 200 yards, 2 TD

**Top rushers**

- ATL – Devonta Freeman – 4 rushes, 38 yards
- NYG – Andre Williams – 20 rushes, 65 yards, TD

**Top receivers**

- ATL – Julio Jones – 11 receptions, 105 yards
- NYG – Preston Parker – 3 receptions, 61 yards

==== Week 6: vs. Chicago Bears ====
Week Six: Chicago Bears at Atlanta Falcons – Game summary

Quarter	1	2	3	4	Total
**Bears**	0	13	6	8	**27**
Falcons	3	0	10	0	**13**

at Georgia Dome, Atlanta, Georgia

- Date: October 12
- Game time: 4:25 p.m. EDT
- Game weather: Played indoors (dome stadium)
- Game attendance: 70,712
- Referee: Walt Anderson
- TV announcers (Fox): Justin Kutcher, David Diehl and Laura Okmin
- Recap, Gamebook

Game information

**First quarter**

- ATL – Matt Bryant 52-yard field goal, 9:41. Falcons 3–0. **Drive: 7 plays, 32 yards, 3:21.**

**Second quarter**

- CHI – Robbie Gould 25-yard field goal, 14:47. Tied 3–3. **Drive: 9 plays, 54 yards, 3:38.**
- CHI – Josh Morgan 3-yard pass from Jay Cutler (Robbie Gould kick), 5:59. Bears 10–3. **Drive: 7 plays, 79 yards, 4:37.**
- CHI – Robbie Gould 28-yard field goal, 0:02. Bears 13–3. **Drive: 12 plays, 83 yards, 4:04.**

**Third quarter**

- ATL – Antone Smith 41-yard pass from Matt Ryan (Matt Bryant kick), 11:19. Bears 13–10. **Drive: 7 plays, 86 yards, 3:41.**
- ATL – Matt Bryant 54-yard field goal, 6:19. Tied 13–13. **Drive: 10 plays, 33 yards, 3:19.**
- CHI – Matt Forte 6-yard run (kick failed), 5:06. Bears 19–13. **Drive: 3 plays, 80 yards, 1:13.**

**Fourth quarter**

- CHI – Matt Forte 9-yard run (Jay Cutler-Martellus Bennett pass), 10:07. Bears 27–13. **Drive: 15 plays, 87 yards, 8:28.**

**Top passers**

- CHI – Jay Cutler – 26/38, 381 yards, TD
- ATL – Matt Ryan – 19/37, 271 yards, TD, INT

**Top rushers**

- CHI – Matt Forte – 17 rushes, 80 yards, 2 TD
- ATL – Steven Jackson – 6 rushes, 25 yards

**Top receivers**

- CHI – Alshon Jeffery – 5 receptions, 136 yards
- ATL – Julio Jones – 4 receptions, 68 yards

==== Week 7: at Baltimore Ravens ====
Week Seven: Atlanta Falcons at Baltimore Ravens – Game summary

Quarter	1	2	3	4	Total
Falcons	0	0	0	7	**7**
**Ravens**	7	10	3	9	**29**

at M&T Bank Stadium, Baltimore, Maryland

- Date: October 19
- Game time: 1:00 p.m. EDT
- Game weather: 54 °F (12 °C), sunny
- Game attendance: 71,184
- Referee: Carl Cheffers
- TV announcers (Fox): Justin Kutcher, David Diehl and Laura Okmin
- Recap, Gamebook

Game information

**First quarter**

- BAL – Owen Daniels 5-yard pass from Joe Flacco (Justin Tucker kick), 11:47. Ravens 7–0. **Drive: 5 plays, 52 yards, 1:49.**

**Second quarter**

- BAL – Bernard Pierce 1-yard run (Justin Tucker kick), 2:38. Ravens 14–0. **Drive: 9 plays, 58 yards, 4:18.**
- BAL – Justin Tucker 38-yard field goal, 0:00. Ravens 17–0. **Drive: 3 plays, 33 yards, 0:37.**

**Third quarter**

- BAL – Justin Tucker 38-yard field goal, 11:28. Ravens 20–0. **Drive: 7 plays, 61 yards, 3:32.**

**Fourth quarter**

- ATL – Roddy White 4-yard pass from Matt Ryan (Matt Bryant kick), 7:12. Ravens 20–7. **Drive: 10 plays, 90 yards, 2:45.**
- BAL – Matt Ryan sacked in endzone by Terrell Suggs for a safety, 3:44. Ravens 22–7.
- BAL – Torrey Smith 39-yard pass from Joe Flacco (Justin Tucker kick), 1:46. Ravens 29–7. **Drive: 4 plays, 40 yards, 1:58.**

**Top passers**

- ATL – Matt Ryan – 29/48, 228 yards, TD
- BAL – Joe Flacco – 16/25, 258 yards, 2 TD, 2 INT

**Top rushers**

- ATL – Steven Jackson – 8 rushes, 22 yards
- BAL – Justin Forsett – 23 rushes, 95 yards

**Top receivers**

- ATL – Roddy White – 9 receptions, 100 yards, TD
- BAL – Torrey Smith – 3 receptions, 81 yards, TD

==== Week 8: vs. Detroit Lions ====
NFL International Series

Week Eight: Detroit Lions at Atlanta Falcons – Game summary

Quarter	1	2	3	4	Total
**Lions**	0	0	10	12	**22**
Falcons	14	7	0	0	**21**

at Wembley Stadium, London, England

- Date: October 26
- Game time: 1:30 p.m. GMT/9:30 a.m. EDT
- Game weather: 59 °F (15 °C), overcast
- Game attendance: 83,532
- Referee: Pete Morelli
- TV announcers (Fox): Thom Brennaman, Troy Aikman and Charissa Thompson
- Recap, Gamebook

Game information

**First quarter**

- ATL – Devonta Freeman 7-yard pass from Matt Ryan (Matt Bryant kick), 9:25. Falcons 7–0. **Drive: 10 plays, 80 yards, 5:35.**
- ATL – Bear Pascoe 1-yard pass from Matt Ryan (Matt Bryant kick), 2:53. Falcons 14–0. **Drive: 6 plays, 56 yards, 3:26.**

**Second quarter**

- ATL – Steven Jackson 1-yard run (Matt Bryant kick), 3:45. Falcons 21–0. **Drive: 12 plays, 89 yards, 6:17.**

**Third quarter**

- DET – Matt Prater 22-yard field goal, 7:54. Falcons 21–3. **Drive: 15 plays, 76 yards, 7:06.**
- DET – Golden Tate 59-yard pass from Matthew Stafford (Matt Prater kick), 4:38. Falcons 21–10. **Drive: 3 plays, 44 yards, 1:44.**

**Fourth quarter**

- DET – Matt Prater 20-yard field goal, 14:10. Falcons 21–13. **Drive: 4 plays, 5 yards, 1:00.**
- DET – Theo Riddick 5-yard pass from Matthew Stafford (pass failed), 3:56. Falcons 21–19. **Drive: 13 plays, 69 yards, 7:29.**
- DET – Matt Prater 48-yard field goal, 0:00. Lions 22–21. **Drive: 11 plays, 63 yards, 1:38.**

**Top passers**

- DET – Matthew Stafford – 24/47, 325 yards, 2 TD, INT
- ATL – Matt Ryan – 20/27, 228 yards, 2 TD, INT

**Top rushers**

- DET – Joique Bell – 14 rushes, 39 yards
- ATL – Steven Jackson – 18 rushes, 60 yards, TD

**Top receivers**

- DET – Golden Tate – 7 receptions, 151 yards, TD
- ATL – Roddy White – 5 receptions, 66 yards

==== Week 10: at Tampa Bay Buccaneers ====
Week Ten: Atlanta Falcons at Tampa Bay Buccaneers – Game summary

Quarter	1	2	3	4	Total
**Falcons**	7	6	3	11	**27**
Buccaneers	3	7	0	7	**17**

at Raymond James Stadium, Tampa, Florida

- Date: November 9
- Game time: 1:00 p.m. EST
- Game weather: 64 °F (18 °C), cloudy
- Game attendance: 57,751
- Referee: Clete Blakeman
- TV announcers (Fox): Thom Brennaman, David Diehl and Laura Okmin
- Recap, Gamebook

Game information

**First quarter**

- TB – Patrick Murray 51-yard field goal, 6:24. Buccaneers 3–0. **Drive: 17 plays, 47 yards, 8:36.**
- ATL – Steven Jackson 1-yard run (Matt Bryant kick), 0:51. Falcons 7–3. **Drive: 11 plays, 78 yards, 5:33.**

**Second quarter**

- ATL – Matt Bryant 37-yard field goal, 7:09. Falcons 10–3. **Drive: 12 plays, 42 yards, 6:53.**
- TB – Mike Evans 22-yard pass from Josh McCown (Matt Bryant kick), 0:46. Tied 10–10. **Drive: 8 plays, 86 yards, 1:45.**
- ATL – Matt Bryant 43-yard field goal, 0:00. Falcons 13–10. **Drive: 6 plays, 33 yards, 0:46.**

**Third quarter**

- ATL – Matt Bryant 44-yard field goal, 10:23. Falcons 16–10. **Drive: 10 plays, 56 yards, 4:37.**

**Fourth quarter**

- TB – Austin Seferian-Jenkins 1-yard pass from Josh McCown (Patrick Murray kick), 14:18. Buccaneers 17–16. **Drive: 8 plays, 34 yards, 4:04.**
- ATL – Roddy White 5-yard pass from Matt Ryan (Matt Ryan-Harry Douglas pass), 9:18. Falcons 24–17. **Drive: 10 plays, 65 yards, 5:00.**
- ATL – Matt Bryant 33-yard field goal, 4:10. Falcons 27–17. **Drive: 5 plays, 36 yards, 2:53.**

**Top passers**

- ATL – Matt Ryan – 20/31, 219 yards, TD
- TB – Josh McCown – 27/43, 301 yards, 2 TD, 2 INT

**Top rushers**

- ATL – Steven Jackson – 16 rushes, 81 yards, TD
- TB – Josh McCown – 5 rushes, 39 yards

**Top receivers**

- ATL – Julio Jones – 8 receptions, 119 yards
- TB – Mike Evans – 7 receptions, 125 yards, TD

==== Week 11: at Carolina Panthers ====
Week Eleven: Atlanta Falcons at Carolina Panthers – Game summary

Quarter	1	2	3	4	Total
**Falcons**	0	6	10	3	**19**
Panthers	0	3	0	14	**17**

at Bank of America Stadium, Charlotte, North Carolina

- Date: November 16
- Game time: 1:00 p.m. EST
- Game weather: 48 °F (9 °C), cloudy
- Game attendance: 73,314
- Referee: Walt Anderson
- TV announcers (Fox): Thom Brennaman, David Diehl and Laura Okmin
- Recap, Gamebook

Game information

**First quarter**

- No scoring plays.

**Second quarter**

- CAR – Graham Gano 23-yard field goal, 14:57. Panthers 3–0. **Drive: 17 plays, 83 yards, 9:05.**
- ATL – Matt Bryant 34-yard field goal, 9:26. Tied 3–3. **Drive: 13 plays, 64 yards, 5:31.**
- ATL – Matt Bryant 42-yard field goal, 0:02. Falcons 6–3. **Drive: 10 plays, 48 yards, 1:33.**

**Third quarter**

- ATL – Matt Bryant 26-yard field goal, 12:07. Falcons 9–3. **Drive: 4 plays, 6 yards, 1:28.**
- ATL – Roddy White 2-yard pass from Matt Ryan (Matt Bryant kick), 6:34. Falcons 16–3. **Drive: 8 plays, 55 yards, 3:49.**

**Fourth quarter**

- CAR – Kelvin Benjamin 22-yard pass from Cam Newton (Graham Gano kick), 9:12. Falcons 16–10. **Drive: 5 plays, 71 yards, 1:50.**
- CAR – Corey Brown 47-yard pass from Cam Newton (Graham Gano kick), 6:20. Panthers 17–16. **Drive: 2 plays, 69 yards, 0:41.**
- ATL – Matt Bryant 44-yard field goal, 2:08. Falcons 19–17. **Drive: 12 plays, 54 yards, 4:12.**

**Top passers**

- ATL – Matt Ryan – 31/45, 268 yards, TD
- CAR – Cam Newton – 23/37, 292 yards, 2 TD, 2 INT

**Top rushers**

- ATL – Steven Jackson – 17 rushes, 41 yards
- CAR – DeAngelo Williams – 10 rushes, 41 yards

**Top receivers**

- ATL – Roddy White – 8 receptions, 75 yards, TD
- CAR – Kelvin Benjamin – 9 receptions, 109 yards, TD

==== Week 12: vs. Cleveland Browns ====
Week Twelve: Cleveland Browns at Atlanta Falcons – Game summary

Quarter	1	2	3	4	Total
**Browns**	7	6	10	3	**26**
Falcons	7	7	0	10	**24**

at Georgia Dome, Atlanta, Georgia

- Date: November 23
- Game time: 1:00 p.m. EST
- Game weather: Played indoors (dome stadium)
- Game attendance: 70,046
- Referee: Brad Allen
- TV announcers (CBS): Andrew Catalon, Steve Beuerlein and Steve Tasker
- Recap, Gamebook

Game information

**First quarter**

- ATL – Julio Jones 24-yard pass from Matt Ryan (Matt Bryant kick), 5:53. Falcons 7–0. **Drive: 10 plays, 57 yards, 4:26.**
- CLE – Isaiah Crowell 11-yard run (Billy Cundiff kick), 1:33. Tied 7–7. **Drive: 10 plays, 80 yards, 4:20.**

**Second quarter**

- CLE – Billy Cundiff 33-yard field goal, 13:17. Browns 10–7. **Drive: 6 plays, 14 yards, 1:37.**
- CLE – Billy Cundiff 37-yard field goal, 9:20. Browns 13–7. **Drive: 5 plays, 21 yards, 1:55.**
- ATL – Jacquizz Rodgers 8-yard pass from Matt Ryan (Matt Bryant kick), 0:55. Falcons 14–13. **Drive: 7 plays, 50 yards, 1:57.**

**Third quarter**

- CLE – Billy Cundiff 32-yard field goal, 9:46. Browns 16–14. **Drive: 11 plays, 66 yards, 5:14.**
- CLE – Isaiah Crowell 26-yard run (Billy Cundiff kick), 0:46. Browns 23–14. **Drive: 9 plays, 70 yards, 4:58.**

**Fourth quarter**

- ATL – Steven Jackson 1-yard run (Matt Bryant kick), 9:31. Browns 23–21. **Drive: 14 plays, 80 yards, 6:15.**
- ATL – Matt Bryant 53-yard field goal, 0:44. Falcons 24–23. **Drive: 7 plays, 20 yards, 1:58.**
- CLE – Billy Cundiff 37-yard field goal, 0:00. Browns 26–24. **Drive: 7 plays, 61 yards, 0:44.**

**Top passers**

- CLE – Brian Hoyer – 23/40, 322 yards, 3 INT
- ATL – Matt Ryan – 27/43, 273 yards, 2 TD, INT

**Top rushers**

- CLE – Isaiah Crowell – 12 rushes, 88 yards, 2 TD
- ATL – Steven Jackson – 13 rushes, 34 yards, TD

**Top receivers**

- CLE – Josh Gordon – 8 receptions, 120 yards
- ATL – Roddy White – 9 receptions, 96 yards

==== Week 13: vs. Arizona Cardinals ====
Week Thirteen: Arizona Cardinals at Atlanta Falcons – Game summary

Quarter	1	2	3	4	Total
Cardinals	0	10	0	8	**18**
**Falcons**	17	3	3	6	**29**

at Georgia Dome, Atlanta, Georgia

- Date: November 30
- Game time: 4:05 p.m. EST
- Game weather: Played indoors (dome stadium)
- Game attendance: 69,557
- Referee: Terry McAulay
- TV announcers (Fox): Kevin Burkhardt, John Lynch and Pam Oliver
- Recap, Gamebook

Game information

**First quarter**

- ATL – Levine Toilolo 1-yard pass from Matt Ryan (Matt Bryant kick), 11:39. Falcons 7–0. **Drive: 8 plays, 71 yards, 3:21.**
- ATL – Matt Bryant 20-yard field goal, 8:13. Falcons 10–0. **Drive: 6 plays, 30 yards, 2:20.**
- ATL – Julio Jones 32-yard pass from Matt Ryan (Matt Bryant kick), 5:48. Falcons 17–0. **Drive: 2 plays, 32 yards, 0:39.**

**Second quarter**

- ARI – Rashad Johnson 88-yard interception return (Chandler Catanzaro kick), 14:07. Falcons 17–7.
- ARI – Chandler Catanzaro 44-yard field goal, 2:42. Falcons 17–10. **Drive: 8 plays, 54 yards, 3:56.**
- ATL – Matt Bryant 23-yard field goal, 0:00. Falcons 20–10. **Drive: 12 plays, 68 yards, 2:42.**

**Third quarter**

- ATL – Matt Bryant 21-yard field goal, 6:13. Falcons 23–10. **Drive: 10 plays, 85 yards, 4:47.**

**Fourth quarter**

- ATL – Matt Bryant 45-yard field goal, 12:55. Falcons 26–10. **Drive: 9 plays, 59 yards, 5:11.**
- ATL – Matt Bryant 28-yard field goal, 2:30. Falcons 29–10. **Drive: 11 plays, 44 yards, 4:47.**
- ARI – Stepfan Taylor 3-yard pass from Drew Stanton (Stepfan Taylor run), 1:05. Falcons 29–18. **Drive: 7 plays, 80 yards, 1:25.**

**Top passers**

- ARI – Drew Stanton – 24/39, 294 yards, TD, 2 INT
- ATL – Matt Ryan – 30/41, 361 yards, 2 TD, INT

**Top rushers**

- ARI – Marion Grice – 5 rushes, 16 yards
- ATL – Steven Jackson – 18 rushes, 101 yards

**Top receivers**

- ARI – Jaron Brown – 7 receptions, 75 yards
- ATL – Julio Jones – 10 receptions, 189 yards, TD

This was the Falcons' only win outside the NFC South division.

==== Week 14: at Green Bay Packers ====
Week Fourteen: Atlanta Falcons at Green Bay Packers – Game summary

Quarter	1	2	3	4	Total
Falcons	7	0	10	20	**37**
**Packers**	7	24	3	9	**43**

at Lambeau Field, Green Bay, Wisconsin

- Date: December 8
- Game time: 8:30 p.m. EST/7:30 p.m. CST
- Game weather: 33 °F (1 °C), flurries
- Game attendance: 77,512
- Referee: Pete Morelli
- TV announcers (ESPN): Mike Tirico, Jon Gruden and Lisa Salters
- Recap, Gamebook

Game information

**First quarter**

- GB – James Starks 3-yard run (Mason Crosby kick), 11:13. Packers 7–0. **Drive: 7 plays, 81 yards, 3:47.**
- ATL – Steven Jackson 4-yard run (Matt Bryant kick), 7:00. Tied 7–7. **Drive: 9 plays, 72 yards, 4:13.**

**Second quarter**

- GB – Eddie Lacy 1-yard run (Mason Crosby kick), 14:55. Packers 14–7. **Drive: 13 plays, 80 yards, 7:05.**
- GB – Mason Crosby 38-yard field goal, 7:17. Packers 17–7. **Drive: 12 plays, 63 yards, 5:56.**
- GB – Eddie Lacy 1-yard pass from Aaron Rodgers (Mason Crosby kick), 4:20. Packers 24–7. **Drive: 4 plays, 15 yards, 2:07.**
- GB – Jordy Nelson 10-yard pass from Aaron Rodgers (Mason Crosby kick), 0:24. Packers 31–7. **Drive: 8 plays, 53 yards, 2:11.**

**Third quarter**

- ATL – Eric Weems 5-yard pass from Matt Ryan (Matt Bryant kick), 12:35. Packers 31–14. **Drive: 5 plays, 82 yards, 2:25.**
- ATL – Matt Bryant 50-yard field goal, 8:20. Packers 31–17. **Drive: 6 plays, 22 yards, 2:31.**
- GB – Mason Crosby 33-yard field goal, 3:57. Packers 34–17. **Drive: 8 plays, 62 yards, 4:23.**

**Fourth quarter**

- ATL – Julio Jones 22-yard pass from Matt Ryan (Matt Bryant kick), 12:33. Packers 34–24. **Drive: 11 plays, 73 yards, 6:24.**
- GB – Jordy Nelson 60-yard pass from Aaron Rodgers (kick failed), 10:38. Packers 40–24. **Drive: 4 plays, 74 yards, 1:55.**
- ATL – Roddy White 1-yard pass from Matt Ryan (pass failed), 6:15. Packers 40–30. **Drive: 12 plays, 71 yards, 4:23.**
- GB – Mason Crosby 53-yard field goal, 4:33. Packers 43–30. **Drive: 4 plays, 6 yards, 1:42.**
- ATL – Harry Douglas 2-yard pass from Matt Ryan (Matt Bryant kick), 2:11. Packers 43–37. **Drive: 9 plays, 66 yards, 2:22.**

**Top passers**

- ATL – Matt Ryan – 24/39, 375 yards, 4 TD, INT
- GB – Aaron Rodgers – 24/36, 327 yards, 3 TD

**Top rushers**

- ATL – Steven Jackson – 16 rushes, 50 yards, TD
- GB – James Starks – 10 rushes, 75 yards, TD

**Top receivers**

- ATL – Julio Jones – 11 receptions, 259 yards, TD
- GB – Jordy Nelson – 8 receptions, 146 yards, 2 TD

==== Week 15: vs. Pittsburgh Steelers ====
Week Fifteen: Pittsburgh Steelers at Atlanta Falcons – Game summary

Quarter	1	2	3	4	Total
**Steelers**	6	14	0	7	**27**
Falcons	0	7	6	7	**20**

at Georgia Dome, Atlanta, Georgia

- Date: December 14
- Game time: 1:00 p.m. EST
- Game weather: Played indoors (dome stadium)
- Game attendance: 71,161
- Referee: Clete Blakeman
- TV announcers (CBS): Greg Gumbel, Trent Green and Evan Washburn
- Recap, Gamebook

Game information

**First quarter**

- PIT – Shaun Suisham 38-yard field goal, 9:08. Steelers 3–0. **Drive: 10 plays, 60 yards, 5:51.**
- PIT – Shaun Suisham 38-yard field goal, 0:02. Steelers 6–0. **Drive: 9 plays, 72 yards, 5:01.**

**Second quarter**

- PIT – William Gay 52-yard interception return (Shaun Suisham kick), 14:46. Steelers 13–0.
- ATL – Devin Hester 17-yard pass from Matt Ryan (Matt Bryant kick), 4:19. Steelers 13–7. **Drive: 9 plays, 85 yards, 5:29.**
- PIT – Le'Veon Bell 1-yard run (Shaun Suisham kick), 0:27. Steelers 20–7. **Drive: 12 plays, 80 yards, 3:52.**

**Third quarter**

- ATL – Matt Bryant 28-yard field goal, 11:00. Steelers 20–10. **Drive: 6 plays, 70 yards, 4:00.**
- ATL – Matt Bryant 22-yard field goal, 2:40. Steelers 20–13. **Drive: 13 plays, 75 yards, 6:04.**

**Fourth quarter**

- PIT – Le'Veon Bell 13-yard run (Shaun Suisham kick), 14:11. Steelers 27–13. **Drive: 6 plays, 80 yards, 3:29.**
- ATL – Roddy White 4-yard pass from Matt Ryan (Matt Bryant kick), 10:21. Steelers 27–20. **Drive: 10 plays, 84 yards, 3:50.**

**Top passers**

- PIT – Ben Roethlisberger – 27/35, 360 yards
- ATL – Matt Ryan – 26/37, 310 yards, 2 TD, INT

**Top rushers**

- PIT – Le'Veon Bell – 20 rushes, 47 yards, 2 TD
- ATL – Steven Jackson – 11 rushes, 46 yards

**Top receivers**

- PIT – Antonio Brown – 10 receptions, 123 yards
- ATL – Harry Douglas – 10 receptions, 131 yards

The Falcons were the only NFC South team to lose to all of their AFC North opponents.

==== Week 16: at New Orleans Saints ====
Week Sixteen: Atlanta Falcons at New Orleans Saints – Game summary

Quarter	1	2	3	4	Total
**Falcons**	3	10	7	10	**30**
Saints	7	0	0	7	**14**

at Mercedes-Benz Superdome, New Orleans, Louisiana

- Date: December 21
- Game time: 1:00 p.m. EST/12:00 p.m. CST
- Game weather: Played indoors (dome stadium)
- Game attendance: 73,164
- Referee: John Parry
- TV announcers (Fox): Kevin Burkhardt, John Lynch and Pam Oliver
- Recap, Gamebook

Game information

**First quarter**

- NO – Mark Ingram 1-yard run (Shayne Graham kick), 14:40. Saints 7–0. **Drive: 1 play, 1 yard, 0:20.**
- ATL – Matt Bryant 44-yard field goal, 11:15. Saints 7–3. **Drive: 7 plays, 55 yards, 3:25.**

**Second quarter**

- ATL – Matt Bryant 50-yard field goal, 11:48. Saints 7–6. **Drive: 7 plays, 32 yards, 4:03.**
- ATL – Eric Weems 3-yard pass from Matt Ryan (Matt Bryant kick), 0:03. Falcons 13–7. **Drive: 15 plays, 89 yards, 5:33.**

**Third quarter**

- ATL – Devonta Freeman 31-yard run (Matt Bryant kick), 5:42. Falcons 20–7. **Drive: 7 plays, 86 yards, 3:40.**

**Fourth quarter**

- NO – Jimmy Graham 4-yard pass from Drew Brees (Shayne Graham kick), 5:48. Falcons 20–14. **Drive: 12 plays, 87 yards, 3:40.**
- ATL – Matt Bryant 32-yard field goal, 1:56. Falcons 23–14. **Drive: 4 plays, 0 yards, 0:32.**
- ATL – Osi Umenyiora 86-yard fumble return (Matt Bryant kick), 0:00. Falcons 30–14.

**Top passers**

- ATL – Matt Ryan – 30/40, 322 yards, TD
- NO – Drew Brees – 30/47, 313 yards, TD, 2 INT

**Top rushers**

- ATL – Devonta Freeman – 5 rushes, 36 yards, TD
- NO – Mark Ingram – 13 rushes, 38 yards, TD

**Top receivers**

- ATL – Julio Jones – 7 receptions, 107 yards
- NO – Marques Colston – 6 receptions, 80 yards

With the win, the Falcons swept the Saints for the 1st time since 2005 and eliminated them from postseason contention.

==== Week 17: vs. Carolina Panthers ====
Week Seventeen: Carolina Panthers at Atlanta Falcons – Game summary

Quarter	1	2	3	4	Total
**Panthers**	10	14	10	0	**34**
Falcons	0	3	0	0	**3**

at Georgia Dome, Atlanta, Georgia

- Date: December 28
- Game time: 4:25 p.m. EST
- Game weather: Played indoors (dome stadium)
- Game attendance: 71,015
- Referee: Bill Leavy
- TV announcers (CBS): Jim Nantz, Phil Simms and Tracy Wolfson
- Recap, Gamebook

Game information

**First quarter**

- CAR – Graham Gano 21-yard field goal, 7:50. Panthers 3–0. **Drive: 12 plays, 77 yards, 7:10.**
- CAR – Ed Dickson 5-yard pass from Cam Newton (Graham Gano kick), 0:04. Panthers 10–0. **Drive: 10 plays, 87 yards, 4:45.**

**Second quarter**

- ATL – Matt Bryant 21-yard field goal, 10:36. Panthers 10–3. **Drive: 10 plays, 35 yards, 4:28.**
- CAR – Roman Harper 31-yard interception return (Graham Gano kick), 4:18. Panthers 17–3.
- CAR – Cam Newton 4-yard run (Graham Gano kick), 1:47. Panthers 24–3. **Drive: 1 play, 4 yards, 0:07.**

**Third quarter**

- CAR – Graham Gano 48-yard field goal, 8:43. Panthers 27–3. **Drive: 8 plays, 29 yards, 4:35.**
- CAR – Tre Boston 84-yard interception return (Graham Gano kick), 0:07. Panthers 34–3.

**Fourth quarter**

- No scoring plays.

**Top passers**

- CAR – Cam Newton – 10/16, 114 yards, TD
- ATL – Matt Ryan – 29/47, 260 yards, 2 INT

**Top rushers**

- CAR – Cam Newton – 6 rushes, 51 yards, TD
- ATL – Jacquizz Rodgers – 9 rushes, 44 yards

**Top receivers**

- CAR – Corey Brown – 1 reception, 28 yards
- ATL – Roddy White – 8 receptions, 104 yards

== Standings ==
=== Division ===
NFC South
	W	L	T	PCT	DIV	CONF	PF	PA	STK
^{(4)} Carolina Panthers	7	8	1	.469	4–2	6–6	339	374	W4
New Orleans Saints	7	9	0	.438	3–3	6–6	401	424	W1
Atlanta Falcons	6	10	0	.375	5–1	6–6	381	417	L1
Tampa Bay Buccaneers	2	14	0	.125	0–6	1–11	277	410	L6

=== Conference ===
NFC
#	Team	Division	W	L	T	PCT	DIV	CONF	SOS	SOV	STK
Division leaders
1 (Note: Seattle, Green Bay and Dallas were ranked in seeds 1–3 based on conference record.)	Seattle Seahawks	West	12	4	0	.750	5–1	10–2	.525	.513	W6
2	Green Bay Packers	North	12	4	0	.750	5–1	9–3	.482	.440	W2
3	Dallas Cowboys	East	12	4	0	.750	4–2	8–4	.445	.422	W4
4	Carolina Panthers	South	7	8	1	.469	4–2	6–6	.490	.357	W4
Wild Cards
5 (Note: Arizona defeated Detroit head-to-head (Week 11, 14–6).)	Arizona Cardinals	West	11	5	0	.688	3–3	8–4	.523	.477	L2
6	Detroit Lions	North	11	5	0	.688	5–1	9–3	.471	.392	L1
Did not qualify for the postseason
7	Philadelphia Eagles	East	10	6	0	.625	4–2	6–6	.490	.416	W1
8	San Francisco 49ers	West	8	8	0	.500	2–4	7–5	.527	.508	W1
9 (Note: New Orleans defeated Minnesota head-to-head (Week 3, 20–9).)	New Orleans Saints	South	7	9	0	.438	3–3	6–6	.486	.415	W1
10	Minnesota Vikings	North	7	9	0	.438	1–5	6–6	.475	.308	W1
11 (Note: The NY Giants defeated both Atlanta and St. Louis head-to-head (Atlanta: Week 5, 30–20; St. Louis: Week 16, 37–27), while Atlanta finished ahead of St. Louis based on conference record.)	New York Giants	East	6	10	0	.375	2–4	4–8	.512	.323	L1
12	Atlanta Falcons	South	6	10	0	.375	5–1	6–6	.482	.380	L1
13	St. Louis Rams	West	6	10	0	.375	2–4	4–8	.531	.427	L3
14	Chicago Bears	North	5	11	0	.313	1–5	4–8	.529	.338	L5
15	Washington Redskins	East	4	12	0	.250	2–4	2–10	.496	.422	L1
16	Tampa Bay Buccaneers	South	2	14	0	.125	0–6	1–11	.486	.469	L6
Tiebreakers (Note: When breaking ties for three or more teams under the NFL's rules, they are first broken within divisions, then comparing only the highest-ranked remaining team from each division.)

== Use of artificial crowd noise ==
Shortly after the end of the post-season the Falcons were investigated by the League for piping artificial crowd noise during opponent's offensive snaps at home games during the 2013 season and the 2014 season. Team owner Arthur Blank stated that he was "angry and embarrassed" about the allegations, and has allegedly acknowledged the validity of the accusations, stating "I think what we've done in 2013 and 2014 was wrong", and promising to cooperate fully with the investigation. The NFL fined the Falcons $350,000 and took away a fifth round draft pick in the 2016 draft as punishment.
