= Arthur Seale =

American kidnapper

Arthur Seale (born 1947), of Hillside, New Jersey, and his wife Irene were responsible for the kidnapping and murder of Sidney Reso, the Vice President of International Operations for Exxon on April 29, 1992, in Morris Township, New Jersey. The case garnered national notoriety.

== Childhood ==
Seale's father was a Hillside police officer. He attended A.P. Morris Elementary, and Hillside High School. Seale graduated from Admiral Farragut Academy in 1965.

== Career ==
In the 1970s, Seale was a police officer for the township. He also worked as Head of Security at Exxon Corporation at the Florham Park, New Jersey ECI - Exxon Company International location in 1982, and was promoted to Security Manager there in 1984. Seale resigned from Exxon a few years later to begin his own furniture business in the Carolinas. After he and his wife, Irene, went broke trying to start their own business in Hilton Head Island, South Carolina, they left town owing creditors and moved in with Arthur's parents in Lebanon Township, New Jersey.

== Kidnapping of Reso ==
Sidney Reso was kidnapped in the early morning hours of April 29, 1992. Prior to the abduction of Reso, Irene frequently jogged in his neighborhood, in order to monitor his daily routine. She learned that he would usually pull out of his driveway in the morning, getting out of his car to pick up the daily newspaper from his driveway on his way to work. On April 29, Irene jogged past Reso's driveway, and deliberately kicked his paper away, so Reso would be forced to walk a longer distance to pick it up. She then entered Arthur's white van, with him in the passenger seat, and drove to Reso's driveway. Arthur had also attached a magnetic sign to his van with a fake brand name, in the hopes that this would throw off any investigation. As Reso got out of his white 1988 Volkswagen Quantum wagon to retrieve his paper, Arthur got out of his own vehicle and took Reso in at gunpoint. When Reso saw a wooden box in the back of Arthur's van, he tried to break free. During the ensuing struggle, Reso was shot in the arm, then bound, gagged, and placed in the box, whereupon the kidnappers drove off. An hour later, a neighbor noticed Reso's car still in the driveway with its engine on and called the police. After being unable to find him in the surrounding area, the police concluded that he had been taken for ransom.

The next day, police received a phone call from a woman claiming to be Reso's kidnapper, directing them to a letter in a highway street sign. In it, the kidnappers claimed to be members of the Greenpeace Environmentalist group who were furious at Exxon after the Exxon Valdez oil spill three years earlier, as well as the 1985 deliberate Sinking of the Rainbow Warrior that killed Greenpeace photographer Fernando Pereira. The note demanded $18.5 million in used $100 bills for Reso's release. The money was to be put into several Eddie Bauer laundry bags and dropped outside a restaurant on River Road. Although the FBI had the money ready and waited outside the restaurant for over an hour, the kidnappers never showed up.

For the next few weeks, the FBI and investigators received several confusing phone calls and letters leading them to various points throughout Morris and Somerset Counties. The offenders made a crude attempt to disguise their voices by speaking in a very high register. One of the calls claimed that the kidnappers were aware of the FBI presence in the ransom deal, and had therefore taken Reso out of the country. However, investigators noticed that the letters were placed in points that only someone with a strong knowledge of Morris Township would have been aware of. They began to suspect that the kidnappers were not members of Greenpeace at all. Another such indication came after the investigators traced the kidnappers' calls; all had been made from nearby payphones. In response to one of the letters, Reso's wife Patricia made two public appearances on TV, pleading for her husband's safe return.

During the investigation, the FBI followed up on several clues, including one eyewitness seeing a white van near Reso's home on the morning of his abduction, a blonde woman seen jogging frequently in the area, and hair belonging to a Golden Retriever found in one of the letters. They would later learn the van belonged to Arthur, the jogger was Irene, and the Seales did indeed own such a dog.

On the night of June 18, the FBI received another call from the kidnappers for a ransom drop. However, the agents arrived at the drop-off location too late; the chief then received a call from the kidnappers trying to work on an alternative plan. During that call, an agent noticed a man picking up a public phone wearing latex rubber gloves. Suspicious, she took down his license plate number as he drove off. The FBI learned that the car belonged to a nearby rental-car agency. Despite the fact the agency was already closed, the owner agreed to meet up with them, whereupon the FBI learned that the car had been rented to someone named Arthur Seale. Seale arrived in that car soon after, while the agents were still present, and was arrested. Irene was also arrested when she arrived at the shop within minutes.

== Imprisonment ==
Seale pleaded guilty to the kidnapping and murder of Sidney Reso. He is serving a 95-year sentence at FCI Fairton in Fairton, New Jersey, for kidnapping and murder. He earned his doctorate in consulting psychology from Capella University while in prison. He also gained some degree of praise and recognition for his work with other inmates, as well as for his articles on prison reform and prisoner rehabilitation.

After Irene pleaded guilty, she cooperated with police in exchange for a reduced prison sentence. She testified that, after abducting Reso, she and her husband confined him to a pine box in a metal storage facility, giving him very little food and water, and no medical treatment for his bullet wound. Three days after the kidnapping, Reso died from heat and exhaustion. The couple dumped his body in Bass River State Park. It would be discovered on June 28. Irene was sentenced to 20 years in prison; she was released in November 2009.
