= Jeff Tittel =

American environmentalist

Jeff Tittel is an American environmentalist. He served as the director of the New Jersey Sierra Club for 23 years, from 1998 to 2021. He is one of the most prominent environmental activists in the state.

Tittel worked on the New Jersey Highlands Act, the New Jersey Clean Car program, a fracking ban in the basin of the Delaware River, and the Global Warming Response Act. He was raised in Hillside, New Jersey and has led environmental activism since an early age.
