= Kendall Ogle =

American football player (born 1975)

No. 59
- Position: Linebacker

Personal information
- Born: November 25, 1975 (age 50); Hillside, New Jersey, U.S.
- Listed height: 6 ft 0 in (1.83 m)
- Listed weight: 231 lb (105 kg)

Career information
- High school: Hillside
- College: Maryland
- NFL draft: 1999: 6th round, 187th overall pick

Career history
- Cleveland Browns (1999–2000)

Career NFL statistics
- GP / GS: 2 / 0
- Stats at Pro Football Reference

Kendall Lamont Ogle (born November 25, 1975) is an American former professional football player who was a linebacker in the National Football League (NFL). He played college football for the Maryland Terrapins. He was selected by the Cleveland Browns in the sixth round of the 1999 NFL draft.

== Professional career ==
Ogle was selected in the sixth round (187th overall) of the 1999 NFL draft by the Cleveland Browns, in the inaugural draft class for the returning franchise.

As a rookie, Ogle appeared in two games. On August 27, 2000, he was placed on injured reserve with a hip injury. He was released on September 19, 2000.
