= David Jones (tight end) =

American football player (born 1968)

No. 82, 80
- Position: Tight end

Personal information
- Born: November 9, 1968 (age 57); East Orange, New Jersey, U.S.
- Listed height: 6 ft 2 in (1.88 m)
- Listed weight: 217 lb (98 kg)

Career information
- High school: Hillside (Hillside, New Jersey)
- College: Delaware State
- NFL draft: 1991: 7th round, 177th overall pick

Career history
- San Diego Chargers (1991); Los Angeles Raiders (1992); Cleveland Browns (1993–1994)*; Amsterdam Admirals (1995-1996)
- * Offseason or practice squad member only

Career NFL statistics
- Receptions: 2
- Receiving yards: 29
- Stats at Pro Football Reference

David Dennison Jones (born November 9, 1968) is an American former professional football player who was a tight end in the National Football League (NFL). He played college football for the Delaware State Hornets and was selected by the San Diego Chargers in the seventh round of the 1991 NFL draft. He played for the Los Angeles Raiders in 1992.

Born in East Orange, New Jersey and raised in Hillside, New Jersey, Jones played prep football at Hillside High School.
