= Brian Ugwu =

American gridiron football player (born 2000)

No. 77 – Hamilton Tiger-Cats
- Position: Defensive lineman
- Roster status: Active
- CFL status: American

Personal information
- Born: October 19, 2000 (age 26)
- Listed height: 6 ft 3 in (1.91 m)
- Listed weight: 256 lb (116 kg)

Career information
- High school: Hillside (Hillside, New Jersey)
- College: Rutgers (2019–2021); Miami (OH) (2012–2024)
- NFL draft: 2025: undrafted

Career history
- Hamilton Tiger-Cats (2026–present)

Awards and highlights
- First-team All-MAC (2024); Second-team All-MAC (2023)
- Stats at Pro Football Reference
- Stats at CFL.ca

Brian Ugwu (born October 19, 2000) is an American professional football defensive lineman for the Hamilton Tiger-Cats of the Canadian Football League (CFL). He played college football for the Rutgers Scarlet Knights and Miami RedHawks.

== Early life ==
Ugwu was born on October 19, 2000, and he attended Hillside High School in Hillside, New Jersey.

== College career ==
Ugwu played college football for the Rutgers Scarlet Knights from 2019 to 2021 and Miami RedHawks from 2022 to 2024. He played in just three games at Rutgers and made one tackle. On April 29, 2022, Ugwu entered the transfer portal. He eventually landed at Miami University where he appeared in 41 games over three seasons. Ugwu tallied 164 tackles, including 36.5 for loss, 20.5 sacks, one interception, two pass deflections, two forced fumbles and three fumble recoveries. He earned second-team All-Mid-American Conference honors in 2023 and first-team honors in 2024.

== Professional career ==
Pre-draft measurables
Height	Weight	Arm length	Hand span	Wingspan	Vertical jump	Broad jump
6 ft 2 in (1.88 m)	249 lb (113 kg)	9 1/4 in (0.23 m)	31 7/8 in (0.81 m)	6 ft 5 in (1.96 m)	35 in (0.89 m)	10 ft 0 in (3.05 m)
All values from Pro day

On January 20, 2026, Ugwu signed with the Hamilton Tiger-Cats of the Canadian Football League (CFL). On May 31, 2026, he was assigned to the practice roster. On October 1, Ugwu was elevated to the active roster and made his CFL debut the following day against the Ottawa Redblacks. He played in the final three games of the season, recording no statistics.
