= Hillside High School (New Jersey) =

High school in Union County, New Jersey, US

Location
- 1085 Liberty Avenue; Hillside, Union County, New Jersey 07205; United States; 40.691612°N 74.236387°W

Information
- Type: Public high school
- Established: 1940
- School district: Hillside Public Schools
- NCES School ID: 340729005540
- Principal: Terry Woolard
- Faculty: 67.2 FTEs
- Grades: 9-12
- Enrollment: 911 (as of 2024–25)
- Student to teacher ratio: 13.6:1
- Colors: Maroon and Gray
- Athletics conference: Union County Interscholastic Athletic Conference (general); Big Central Football Conference (football)
- Team name: Comets
- Accreditation: Middle States Association of Colleges and Schools
- Newspaper: Hiller
- Yearbook: Epoch
- Website: hhs.hillsidek12.org

Hillside High School is a comprehensive four-year public high school that serves students in ninth through twelfth grades from Hillside, in the U.S. state of New Jersey, operating as the lone secondary school of the Hillside Public Schools. The school is accredited with stipulations through January 2031 by the Middle States Association of Colleges and Schools Commission on Elementary and Secondary Schools.

As of the 2024–25 school year, the school had an enrollment of 911 students and 67.2 classroom teachers (on an FTE basis), for a student–teacher ratio of 13.6:1. There were 533 students (58.5% of enrollment) eligible for free lunch and 73 (8.0% of students) eligible for reduced-cost lunch.

== Awards, recognition and rankings ==
The school was the 250th-ranked public high school in New Jersey out of 339 schools statewide in New Jersey Monthly in 2014. The school had been ranked 166th in the state of 328 schools in 2012, after being ranked 217th in 2010 out of 322 schools listed. The magazine ranked the school 287th in 2008 out of 316 schools.

== History ==
The district established a high school program at Central Grammar School, which was completed in 1917, prior to which Hillside students in grades 9-12 attended Battin High School in Eizabeth. The current high school facility was constructed in 1940, allowing students in grades 10-12 to attend the new Hillside High School; the Coe Avenue (A.P. Morris) School became a grammar school.

In 2001, students from David Brearley High School and Hillside High School collaborated to develop literary and art projects about bigotry presented at an exhibit, "Making Connections: Two Culturally Diverse Schools Address Prejudice and Hatred by Studying the Holocaust Together." The exhibit was presented at Kean University, and was viewed together with local Holocaust survivors and concentration camp liberators.

== Athletics ==
The Hillside High School Comets compete in the Union County Interscholastic Athletic Conference, which is comprised of public and private high schools in Union County and was established following a reorganization of sports leagues in Northern New Jersey undertaken by the New Jersey State Interscholastic Athletic Association (NJSIAA). Before the 2010 realignment, the school had participated in the Mountain Valley Conference, which consisted of public and private high schools in Essex and Somerset and Union counties. With 634 students in grades 10-12, the school was classified by the NJSIAA for the 2019–20 school year as Group II for most athletic competition purposes, which included schools with an enrollment of 486 to 758 students in that grade range. The football team competes in Division 2A of the Big Central Football Conference, which includes 60 public and private high schools in Hunterdon, Middlesex, Somerset, Union and Warren counties, which are broken down into 10 divisions by size and location. The school was classified by the NJSIAA as Group II South for football for 2024–2026, which included schools with 514 to 685 students.

The football team won the North II Group II state championship in 1985 and won the Central Jersey Group II championship in 2017-2019. In 1985, the Hillside Comets football team finished with an 11–1 record and a North II Group II state championship with a 13-12 win against Madison High School in the sectional title game. The seventh-seeded Hillside team won its second North II Group II state sectional championship with a 20-13 win at High Point Solutions Stadium against top-seeded and previously undefeated Point Pleasant Borough High School in the finals of the 2017 tournament. In 2018, the team defeated Manasquan High School by a score of 36-10 to win the Central Jersey Group II title. The 2019 team won its third consecutive Central Jersey Group II title with a 14-10 victory against West Deptford High School in the championship game and went on to finish the season with a 12-0 record.

The boys' basketball team won the Group II state championships in both 1990 and 1992, defeating Middle Township High School in the tournament final in both years. The 1990 team won the Group II state title with a 50-48 victory against Middle Township in the championship game played at the Rutgers Athletic Center and advanced to the Tournament of Champions as the sixth seed, falling to number-three McCorristin Catholic High School by a score 76-49 in the quarterfinals to finish the season with a record of 27-3. The 1992 team won the Group II title in overtime by a score of 62-60 against Middle Township in the championship game played at Rutgers University.

In 2011, the Hillside High School cheerleading team won the title of State Champions at the NJCDCA competition in Trenton in the Intermediate Varsity division. After this victory the cheerleaders held this title for three years in a row, repeating as state division champion in 2012 and 2013.

== Administration ==
The school's principal is Terry Woolard. His core administration team includes the vice principal.

== Notable alumni ==
- Nahree Biggins (born 2001), running back for the Hamilton Tiger-Cats of the Canadian Football League
- Clint Bolick (born 1957, class of 1975), Associate Justice of the Arizona Supreme Court
- Hiram Chodosh (born 1962), Fifth president of Claremont McKenna College
- David Jones (born 1968), former NFL tight end who played for the Los Angeles Raiders
- Marc Leepson (born 1945, class of 1963), journalist and historian
- Adrienne A. Mandel (born 1936), politician who served in the Maryland House of Delegates
- Rollie Massimino (born 1934, class of 1952), college basketball coach who coached at Hillside and won the 1985 NCAA championship with the Villanova Wildcats
- Jerron McMillian (born 1989), NFL safety who played for the Green Bay Packers
- Kendall Ogle (born 1975), linebacker who played in the NFL for the Cleveland Browns
- Alan Paul (born 1949), singer and composer who co-founded the current incarnation of the vocal group The Manhattan Transfer
- Arthur Seale (born 1946, class of 1964), responsible for the kidnapping and murder of an Exxon executive in 1992
- Marquis Spruill (born 1991), football linebacker
- Dan Studney (born 1941, class of 1959), former track and field athlete who won the gold medal in the javelin throw at the 1963 Pan American Games
- Brian Ugwu (born 2000), defensive lineman for the Hamilton Tiger-Cats of the Canadian Football League
- Hela Yungst (1950–2002), Miss New Jersey 1971 who became the New Jersey Lottery television representative
