= Adrienne A. Mandel =

American politician

Member of the Maryland House of Delegates from the 19th district
- In office January 11, 1995 – January 10, 2007

Personal details
- Born: September 30, 1936 (age 89) Irvington, New Jersey, U.S.
- Spouse: Emanuel Mandel (m. 1958)
- Children: 2
- Education: Hillside High School; Rutgers University (BA); George Washington University (MA); Harvard Kennedy School
- Profession: Politician

Adrienne Abramson Mandel (born September 30, 1936) is an American politician who was a member of the Maryland House of Delegates from the 19th district from 1995 to 2007.

== Early life and education ==
Adrienne Mandel was born in Irvington, New Jersey. She attended Hillside High School in Hillside, New Jersey and was involved in the organization B'nai B'rith Girls, a youth arm of the B'nai B'rith Jewish service organization.

She attended Rutgers University, earning a Bachelors of Arts in political science in 1958. She later attended George Washington University and graduated in 1984 with a Masters of Arts in legislative policy. In 2003, Mandel graduated from the Executive Program of the John F. Kennedy School of Government, Harvard University.

In 1958, she married Emanuel (Manny) Mandel. They had two children together.

== Career ==
Mandel moved with her family to Cleveland, Ohio in the 1960s. She worked part-time while taking care of her two children. During this time, she also volunteered with the League of Women Voters.

Mandel moved to Silver Spring, Maryland in 1972 and began working at federally-funded civil service departments in Montgomery County, including a job at the Holiday Park Senior Center, working with the recreation center programs for senior citizens, and a position in the Office of State Affairs in Montgomery County. Mandel then worked as a lobbyist for the Office of State Affairs. She worked in this position from 1984 to 1994, conducting department research and supporting the State Delegates of Annapolis, MD.

In 1994, Mandel ran for and was elected as one of the delegates in the Maryland House of Delegates. She represented the 19th District, Montgomery County, MD from January 11, 1995, until January 10, 2007. During her time as a delegate, she worked to extend the state requirements to earn a driver's license in Maryland and helped write legislation to employ more nurses at hospitals and increase Maryland's healthcare benefits. She was also a part of several committees during her career as a Maryland Democratic delegate, including member of the Joint Committee on Children, Youth, and Families and the chair of the Joint Committee on Health Care Delivery and Financing.

Mandel was also appointed as president of the Women's Caucus, focusing her work on women's issues and community advocacy.
