= Marc Leepson =

American journalist

- Born: June 20, 1945 (age 81); Newark, New Jersey, United States
- Allegiance: United States
- Service years: 1967-1969
- Education: George Washington University (MA)
- Children: 1 son and daughter
- Other work: Desperate Engagement; Flag: An American Biography; Saving Monticello
- Website: marcleepson.com

Marc Leepson (born June 20, 1945) is an American journalist, historian, and author.

== Education ==
Leepson was educated at Hillside High School in Hillside, New Jersey (Class of 1963) and George Washington University where he received his Bachelor of Arts degree in history in 1967 and his Master of Arts degree in European History in 1971.

== Military service ==
Almost immediately after graduating from college, Leepson's draft classification was changed by his local draft board and he was drafted into the United States Army on July 11, 1967. Chosen to be trained as a clerk, he served for two years, including a year (December 1967-December 1968) in the Vietnam War with the 527th Personnel Service Company in Qui Nhơn. He received his honorable discharge in 1969.

== Career ==
Leepson was a staff writer at Congressional Quarterly in Washington, D.C. from 1976 to 1986. He has been a full-time freelance writer since 1986. He is Senior Writer, Arts Editor and columnist for The VVA Veteran, the magazine published by Vietnam Veterans of America, since 1986.

His work has appeared in many magazines and newspapers, including The Washington Post, The New York Times, The New York Times Book Review, Chicago Tribune, The Baltimore Sun, and Smithsonian, Preservation, and Military History magazines. He has been interviewed many times on radio and television, including on The Today Show, CBS This Morning Saturday, CNN, MSNBC, Fox News, The History Channel, The Discovery Channel, PBS-TV's History Detectives, All Things Considered, Talk of the Nation, Studio 360, NPR's Here and Now, To The Point, Morning Edition, The Diane Rehm Show, "Imus in the Morning," the BBC Newshour, Russian Channel 1 TV (RTV), Irish Radio, and CBC (Canada).

He is a contributor to The Encyclopædia Britannica, and has written entries for the Encyclopedia Americana, the Encyclopedia Americana Yearbook, the Oxford Encyclopedia of American Political and Legal History, and the Dictionary of Virginia Biography.

Since the early 1990s, he has been active in many non-profit groups. That includes board memberships on the Middleburg (Virginia) Library Advisory Board (President and Vice President), the Loudoun County (Virginia) Library Board of Trustees, the Library of Virginia Foundation (Treasurer), the Virginia State Library Board, the Friends of Thomas Balch Library, the YMCA of Loudoun County (Virginia), the Goose Creek Association (Secretary), and the Virginia Piedmont Heritage Area Association (Secretary, Vice President, President). He taught U.S. history at Lord Fairfax Community College (now known as Laurel Ridge Community College) in Warrenton, Virginia from 2008 to 2015, and was Scholar in Residence at Mikveh Israel Synagogue in Savannah, Georgia, in May 2017.

A member of The Authors Guild, he was elected to the Board of Directors of the Biographers International Organization (BIO) in 2013. He was named the organization's Treasurer in 2014. He received a 2019 National Society Daughters of the American Revolution History Award Medal.

== Personal life ==
Leepson lives in Loudoun County, Virginia. He and his wife, Janna (Murphy) Leepson, have two children, Devin and Cara, and three grandchildren.

== Selected bibliography ==
- Leepson, Marc. Saving Monticello: One Family's Epic Quest To Rescue The House That Jefferson Built. New York: Free Press, 2001. ISBN 0-743-20106-X OCLC 46822427
- Leepson, Marc. Flag: An American Biography. New York: Thomas Dunne Books/St. Martin's Press, 2005. ISBN 0-312-32308-5 OCLC 57366106
- Leepson, Marc. Desperate Engagement: How A Little-Know Civil War Battle Saved Washington, D.C., And Changed American History. New York: Thomas Dunne Books/St. Martin's Press, 2007. ISBN 0-312-36364-8 OCLC 122337918
- Leepson, Marc. Lafayette: Lessons in Leadership from The Idealist General. New York: Palgrave Macmillan, 2011. ISBN 0-230-10504-1 OCLC 651011968; University of Virginia Press, 2025, paper. ISBN 0813954428
- Leepson, Marc. What So Proudly We Hailed: Francis Scott Key, A Life. Palgrave Macmillan, 2014. ISBN 1137278285<
- Leepson, Marc, editor. Webster's New World Dictionary of the Vietnam War. ISBN 978-0756757359
- Leepson, Marc. Ballad of the Green Beret: The Life and Wars of Staff Sergeant Barry Sadler from the Vietnam War and Pop Stardom to Murder and an Unsolved, Violent Death. Stackpole Books, 2017. ISBN 0811717496
- Leepson, Marc. Huntland: The Historic Country House, the Property, and Its Owners, 1941-2022. Huntland Press/University of Virginia Press, 2023. ASIN|B0CMLDRLJR
- Leepson, Marc. The Unlikely War Hero: A Vietnam War POW’s Story of Courage and Resilience in the Hanoi Hilton. Stackpole Books, 2024. ISBN 978-0811772921
