= Woodruff House (Hillside, New Jersey) =

Historic house in New Jersey, United States

- U.S. National Register of Historic Places
- New Jersey Register of Historic Places
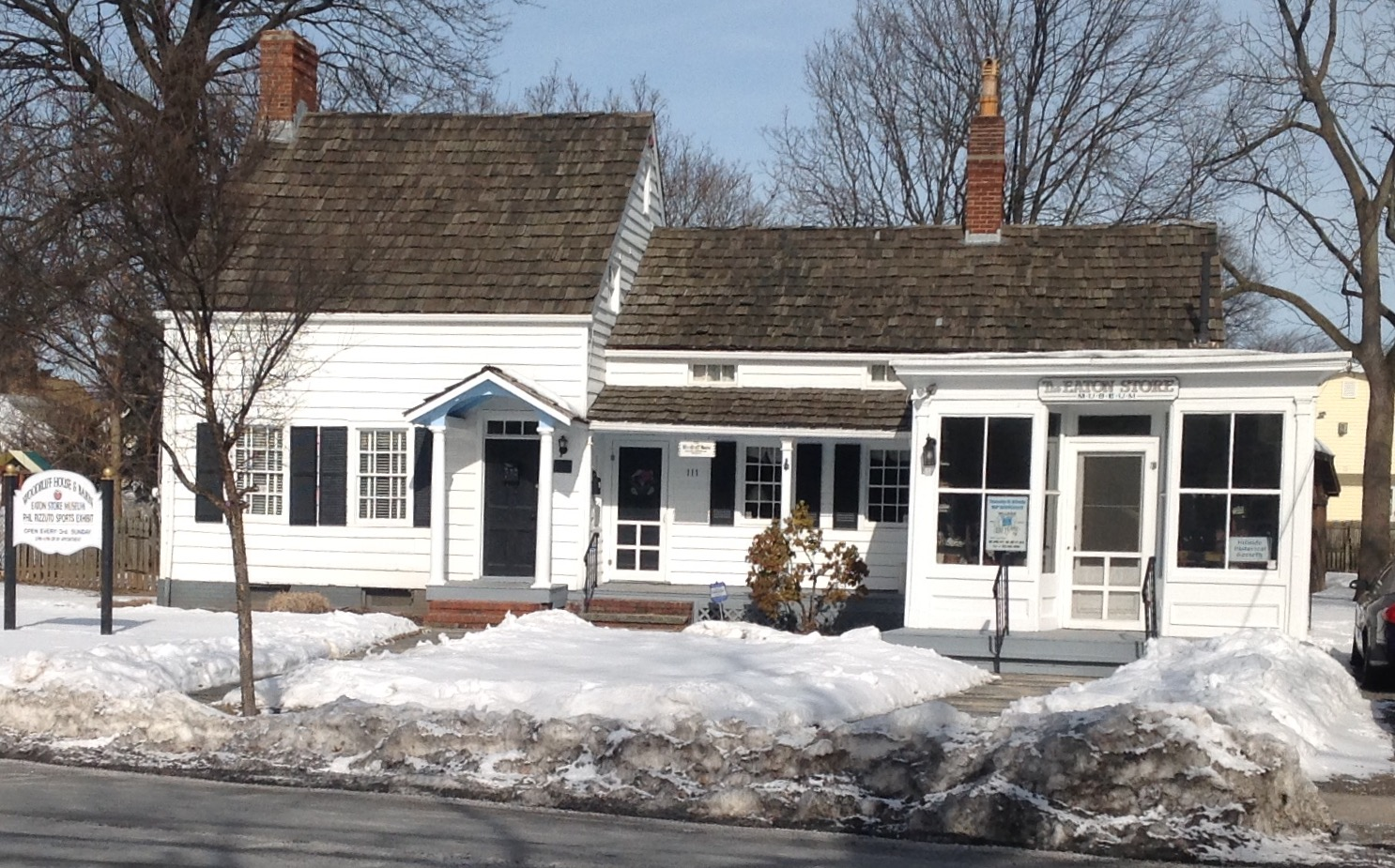

- Location within Union County, New Jersey Location within New Jersey Location within the United States
- Location: 111-113 Conant Street, Hillside, New Jersey
- Coordinates: 40°41′14″N 74°13′12″W
- Area: 0.2 acres (0.081 ha)
- Built: 1735
- Architectural style: Colonial
- NRHP reference No.: 78001800
- NJRHP No.: 2682

Significant dates
- Added to NRHP: December 11, 1978
- Designated NJRHP: June 14, 1978

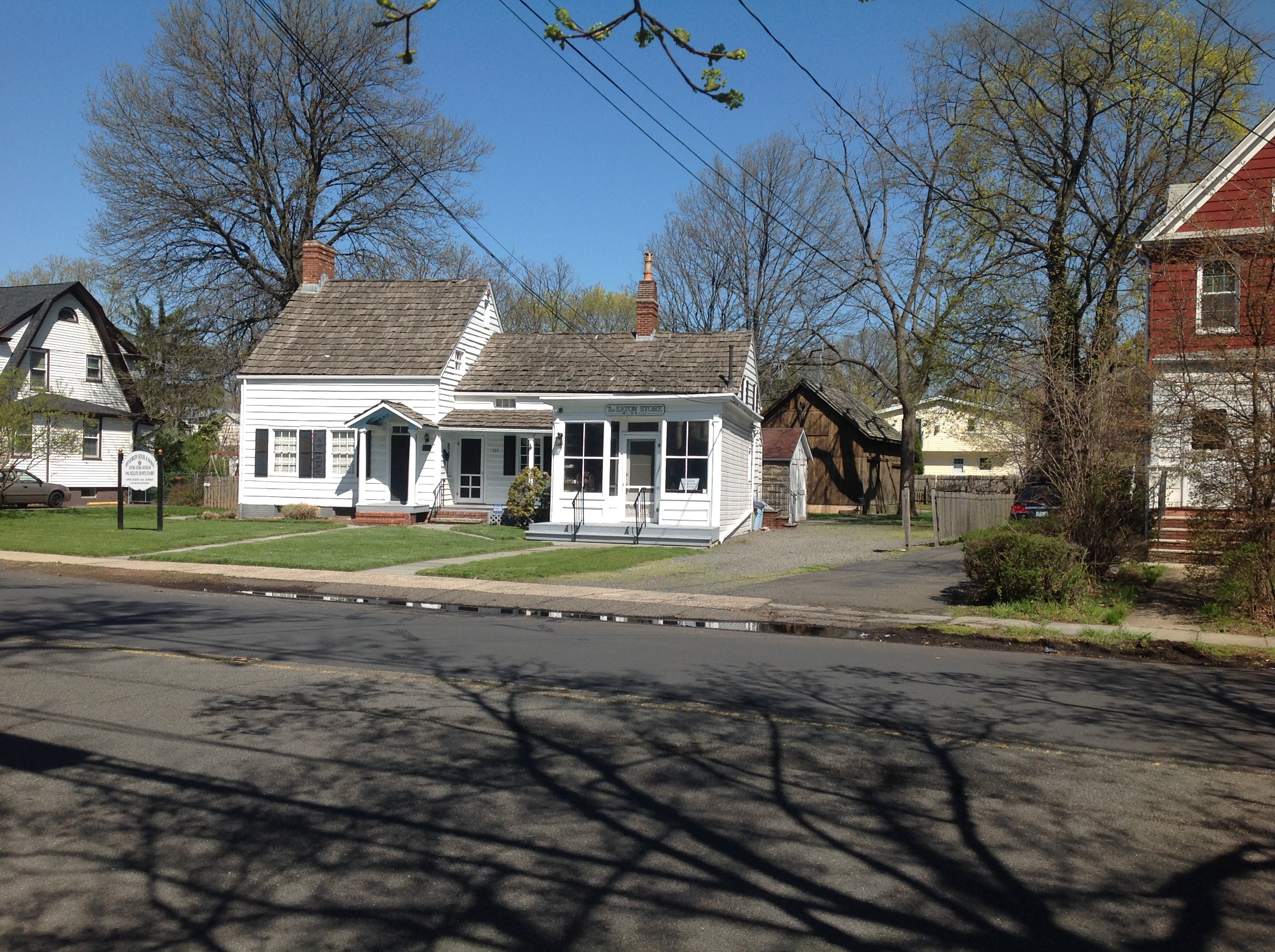
The Woodruff house as seen from Conant Street. The original 1735 structure to the left, the 1790 addition in the middle, the Eaton store to the right, and the replica barn in the back.

The Woodruff House is located in Hillside, Union County, New Jersey, United States. The house was built in 1735 and was added to the National Register of Historic Places on December 11, 1978.

== History ==
The site of the house consists of two lots of land from the Elizabethtown Land Grants that where awarded to John Woodruff in 1664 consisting of 292 acres. The house itself was built by Timothy Woodruff in 1735 along an old Indian trail that later became Salem Avenue. At the end of the American Revolutionary War the house was listed as owned by one Jacob Woodruff, the son of Timothy.

After Jacob's death in 1790 his brother, also named Timothy, took over the house, before passing to his son Enos, then his son, another Timothy, followed by three Charles Woodruff's in a row. The third Charles, Charles T. Woodruff, served as president of the Union County Agricultural Board, was elected to the Hillside Township Committee, and was a local tax collector, who built a family store addition to the front of the house in 1900.

After the family store proved unprofitable, it was rented out to various local families, initially, and for the longest period, the Easton family. The house remained in the Woodruff family continuously from its construction until it was taken over by the Hillside Historical Society in 1978 from T. Winslow Woodruff, the son of Charles T. The direct line of Woodruffs has since disappeared.

== Structure ==
The Woodruff house consists of three distinct sections, the original 1735 structure, and 1790 addition, and the Eaton Store, built in 1900. The house is currently maintained as a museum with various local colonial artifacts by the Hillside Historical Society.

=== 1735 house ===
The initial structure, built in 1735 by Timothy and Jacob Woodruff. It consists of two rooms, a front and a rear room. The front room contains a large fireplace and acted as the original kitchen as well as a living room and dining room, while the rear room had a smaller fireplace and consisted of a bedroom.

=== 1790 addition ===
An additional large room was added to the structure in 1790 as a "borning room" for giving birth. The "borning room" was later split and repurposed into a kitchen and a bathroom.

=== Eaton Store ===
The most recent addition to the house, built in 1900 by Charles T. Woodruff. At the time the Woodruff's had built a second, larger, house next door to actually live in, and Charles T. sought to turn the old house into a home for his grandparents, as well as a store for them to run that would sell apples, cider, eggs and other grocery items that the Woodruff’s produced on their farm. It is a large single room added to the front of the 1790 addition. The family store proved unprofitable, and the Woodruff's rented it to Gilbert Easton, who operated a general store out of it until 1927 which was notable for having the first telephone in Hillside Township.

=== Barn ===
Built in 1989 as an amalgamation of several of the original Woodruff barns that all burned down, the barn was constructed using period accurate methods, using no nails in the farm, instead using mortise-and-tenon joints.

=== Outhouse ===
The most recent addition in 2006 is a period-accurate recreation of an outhouse that would've existed on the property but was destroyed.

== See also ==
- National Register of Historic Places listings in Union County, New Jersey
- List of the oldest buildings in New Jersey
