= Nahree Biggins =

American football player (born 2001)

- Biggins with the Hamilton Tiger-Cats in 2026

No. 41 – Hamilton Tiger-Cats
- Position: Running back
- Roster status: Active
- CFL status: American

Personal information
- Born: October 5, 2001 (age 25)
- Listed height: 6 ft 1 in (1.85 m)
- Listed weight: 210 lb (95 kg)

Career information
- High school: Hillside (Hillside, New Jersey)
- College: Central Michigan (2021–2025)
- NFL draft: 2026: undrafted

Career history
- Hamilton Tiger-Cats (2026–present)
- Stats at CFL.ca

Nahree Emil Biggins (born October 5, 2001) is an American professional football running back for the Hamilton Tiger-Cats of the Canadian Football League (CFL). He played college football for the Central Michigan Chippewas.

== Early life ==
Biggins was born on October 5, 2001. He attended Hillside High School in Hillside, New Jersey, and as a senior had 1,441 yards and 16 touchdowns from scrimmage as wide receiver and defensive back.

== College career ==
Biggins played college football for the Central Michigan Chippewas from 2021 to 2025. He redshirted his first year and played the next two at defensive back, registering 15 tackles one interceptions and two pass deflections. Before the 2024 season, Biggins switched to running back. He rushed for 676 yards, two touchdowns and had 22 catches for 192 yards and one touchdown in 18 games.

== Professional career ==
Pre-draft measurables
Height	Weight	Arm length	Hand span	Wingspan	40-yard dash	10-yard split	20-yard split	20-yard shuttle	Three-cone drill	Vertical jump	Broad jump	Bench press
5 ft 11 in (1.80 m)	201 lb (91 kg)	31 1/2 in (0.80 m)	8 3/4 in (0.22 m)	6 ft 2 3/8 in (1.89 m)	4.66 s	1.64 s	2.76 s	4.32 s	7.05 s	35 1/2 in (0.90 m)	9 ft 9 in (2.97 m)	19 reps
All values from Pro Day

After going undrafted in the 2026 NFL draft, Biggins signed with the Hamilton Tiger-Cats of the Canadian Football League (CFL). On May 31, 2026, he was signed to the practice roster. On September 6, Biggins was promoted to the active roster and made his debut the following day. He finished with 36 rushing yards and two receptions for 15 yards.
