= Jerron McMillian =

American football player (born 1989)

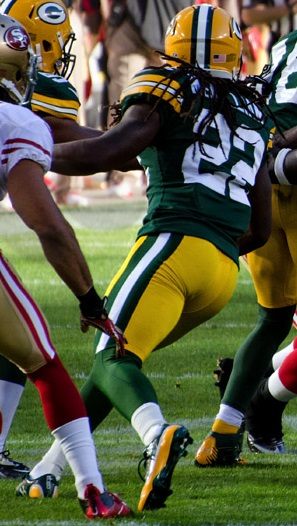
- McMillian with the Green Bay Packers in 2012

No. 22, 34
- Position: Safety

Personal information
- Born: April 2, 1989 (age 37); Newark, New Jersey, U.S.
- Listed height: 5 ft 11 in (1.80 m)
- Listed weight: 203 lb (92 kg)

Career information
- High school: Hillside (NJ)
- College: Maine
- NFL draft: 2012: 4th round, 133rd overall pick

Career history
- Green Bay Packers (2012–2013); Kansas City Chiefs (2014)*
- * Offseason or practice squad member only

Career NFL statistics
- Total tackles: 42
- Fumble recoveries: 1
- Pass deflections: 6
- Interceptions: 1
- Stats at Pro Football Reference

Jerron McMillian (born April 2, 1989) is an American former professional football player who was a safety in the National Football League (NFL). He played college football for the Maine Black Bears. McMillian was selected by the Green Bay Packers in the fourth round of the 2012 NFL draft. He was also a member of the Kansas City Chiefs.

== Early life ==
McMillian was born on April 2, 1989, to John and Rosemary McMillian. He attended Hillside High School, where he played quarterback and safety under coach Jim Hopke and served as team captain, earning all-state, all-county and All-Mountain Valley Conference honors. He also played basketball and was named to his high school's academic honor roll.

== College career ==
McMillian played safety for the Maine Black Bears under head coach Jack Cosgrove. In McMillian's senior season he led a stout Maine defense to a #8 Ranking in the FBS and had 92 total tackles 61 solo and 31 assisted along with 11.5 tfl and 3.5 sacks with 1 interception and 5 breakups.

== Professional career ==
=== Green Bay Packers ===
McMillian was selected in the fourth round (133rd overall) by the Green Bay Packers in the 2012 NFL draft. On May 11, 2012, he signed a contract with the Packers.

On December 3, 2013, he was released by the Packers.

=== Kansas City Chiefs ===
McMillian signed with the Kansas City Chiefs on January 12, 2014. The Chiefs released McMillian on August 25, 2014.

=== Statistics ===
Source: NFL.com

Year	Team	G	GS	Tackles					Interceptions						Fumbles	
Year	Team	G	GS	Total	Solo	Ast	Sck	SFTY	PDef	Int	Yds	Avg	Lng	TDs	FF	FR
Regular season
2012	GB	16	0	27	15	12	0.0	0	5	1	0	0.0	0	0	0	0
2013	GB	12	2	15	15	0	0.0	0	1	0	0	0.0	0	0	0	0
Total		28	2	42	30	12	0.0	0	6	1	0	0.0	0	0	0	0
Postseason
2012	GB	2	0	1	0	1	0.0	0	0	0	0	0.0	0	0	0	0
Total		2	0	1	0	1	0.0	0	0	0	0	0.0	0	0	0	0
