= Hillside Public Schools =

School district in Union County, New Jersey, US

Address
- 195 Virginia Street Hillside, Union County, New Jersey, 07205; United States
- Coordinates: 40.689405°N 74.222453°W

District information
- Grades: PreK-12
- Superintendent: Erskine R. Glover
- Business administrator: Dwayne McNeil
- Schools: 7

Students and staff
- Enrollment: 3,046 (as of 2023–24)
- Faculty: 257.8 FTEs
- Student–teacher ratio: 11.8:1

Other information
- District Factor Group: CD
- Website: District website
Ind.	Per pupil	District spending	Rank (*)	K-12 average	%± vs. average
1A	Total Spending	$18,788	48	$18,891	−0.5%
1	Budgetary Cost	13,925	38	14,783	−5.8%
2	Classroom Instruction	8,026	30	8,763	−8.4%
6	Support Services	2,071	36	2,392	−13.4%
8	Administrative Cost	1,735	56	1,485	16.8%
10	Operations & Maintenance	1,852	52	1,783	3.9%
13	Extracurricular Activities	216	5	268	−19.4%
16	Median Teacher Salary	64,238	39	64,043
Data from NJDoE 2014 Taxpayers' Guide to Education Spending. *Of K-12 districts with 1,800-3,500 students. Lowest spending=1; Highest=68

The Hillside Public Schools are a comprehensive community public school district that serves students in pre-kindergarten through twelfth grade from Hillside, in Union County, in the U.S. state of New Jersey.

As of the 2023–24 school year, the district, comprised of seven schools, had an enrollment of 3,046 students and 257.8 classroom teachers (on an FTE basis), for a student–teacher ratio of 11.8:1.

== History ==
Hillside High School on Liberty Avenue was originally constructed in 1940, replacing the Coe Avenue (A.P. Morris) School which became a grammar school. Additions were later added to accommodate the baby-boomers of the 1950s and 1960s. In the mid-1960s the high school held some 1,500 students.

The district had been classified by the New Jersey Department of Education as being in District Factor Group "CD", the sixth-highest of eight groupings. District Factor Groups organize districts statewide to allow comparison by common socioeconomic characteristics of the local districts. From lowest socioeconomic status to highest, the categories are A, B, CD, DE, FG, GH, I and J.

== Schools ==
Schools in the district (with 2023–24 enrollment data from the National Center for Education Statistics) are:

Elementary schools

- Abram P. Morris Early Childhood Center with 664 students in grades PreK–1
  - Victoria Palmer-Gilliard, Principal
- Ola Edwards Community School with 394 students in grades 2–6
  - Kimley Davis, principal
- Hurden Looker School with 393 students in grades 2–6
  - Daniella Alvarez, principal
- Deanna G. Taylor Academy with 191 students in grades 2–6
  - Rahim Graham, principal

Middle schools

- Hillside Innovation Academy with 101 students in grades 7–8
  - Nicole Silva, principal
- Walter O. Krumbiegel Middle School with 309 students in grades 7–8
  - Roy T. Wilson, principal

High school

- Hillside High School with 927 students in grades 9–12
  - Terry Woolard, principal

== Administration ==
Core members of the district's administration are:

- Erskine R. Glover, superintendent
- Dwayne McNeil, business administrator and board secretary

== Board of education ==
The district's board of education, comprised of nine members, sets policy and oversees the fiscal and educational operation of the district through its administration. As a Type II school district, the board's trustees are elected directly by voters to serve three-year terms of office on a staggered basis, with three seats up for election each year held (since 2012) as part of the November general election. The board appoints a superintendent to oversee the district's day-to-day operations and a business administrator to supervise the business functions of the district.
