= Marquis Spruill =

American gridiron football player (born 1991)

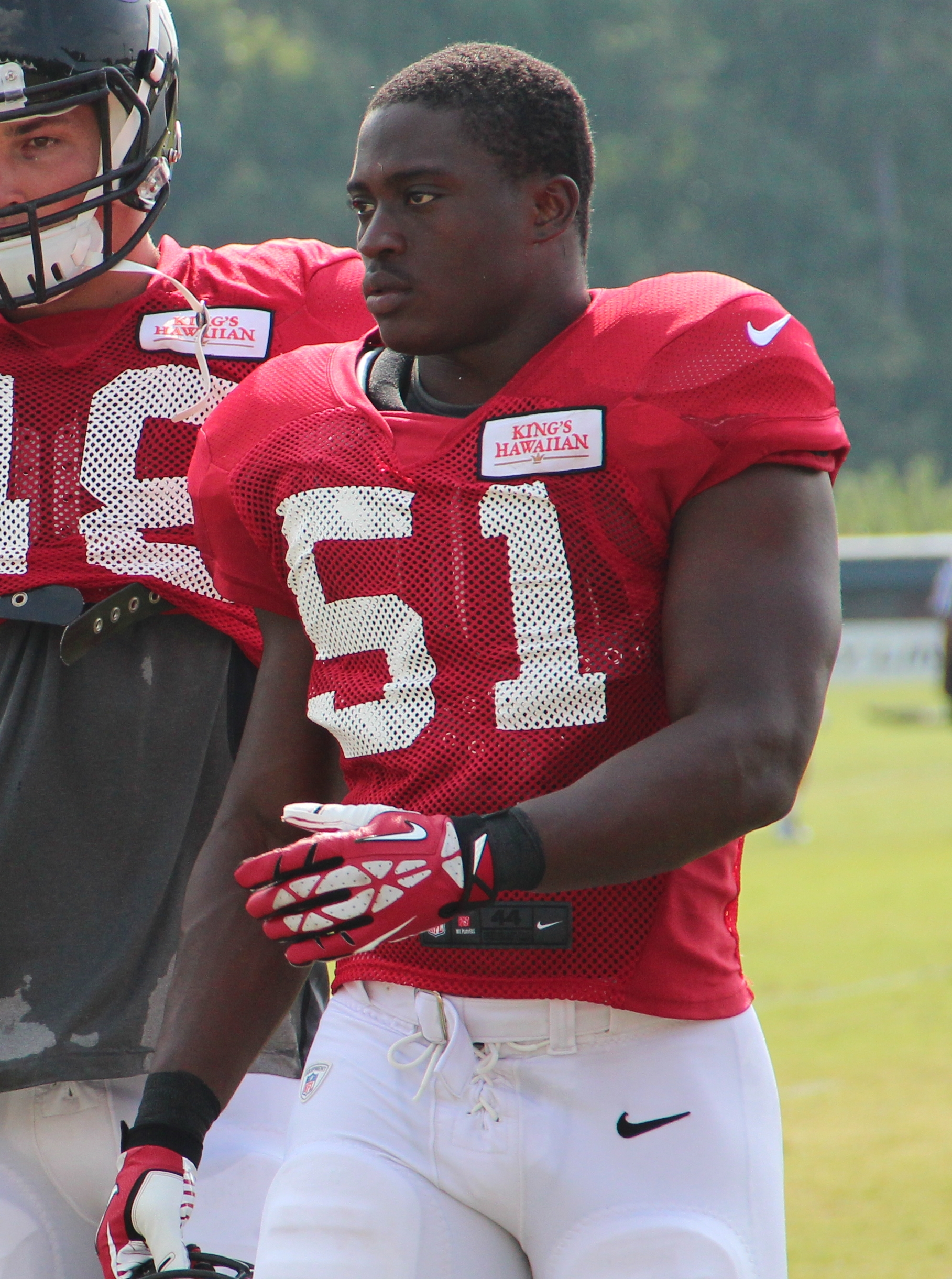
- Spruill with the Atlanta Falcons in 2014

No. 35
- Position: Linebacker

Personal information
- Born: May 14, 1991 (age 35); Newark, New Jersey, U.S.
- Listed height: 6 ft 1 in (1.85 m)
- Listed weight: 231 lb (105 kg)

Career information
- High school: Hillside (NJ)
- College: Syracuse
- NFL draft: 2014: 5th round, 168th overall pick

Career history
- Atlanta Falcons (2014); Toronto Argonauts (2016)*
- * Offseason or practice squad member only

Awards and highlights
- Second-team All-Big East (2011)
- Stats at Pro Football Reference

Marquis Spruill (born May 14, 1991) is an American former football linebacker. He was selected by the Atlanta Falcons in the fifth round of the 2014 NFL draft. He played college football at Syracuse. He was also a member of the Toronto Argonauts.

== Early life ==
Raised in Hillside, New Jersey, Spruill played prep football at Hillside High School and did a post-graduate year at Fork Union Military Academy after he didn't receive a scholarship offer as a senior at Hillside.

== College career ==
Spruill attended Syracuse University and played Division 1 football in the Big East and later in the ACC. Spruill recorded 243 tackles, including 41 for a loss (second most in program history), three forced fumbles, a fumble recovery and four pass defenses. During his four-year college career, he was a 2011 All-Big East Second-team selection and 2013 All-ACC Honorable mention.

== Professional career ==
=== Atlanta Falcons ===
The Atlanta Falcons became interested in Spruill as they looked to add depth to the inside linebacker position. They traded their 2014 sixth and seventh round draft picks to the Minnesota Vikings, to move up and select him in the fifth round with the 168th overall pick. Spruill injured his left knee (torn ACL) on August 6, 2014, ending his rookie season. He was placed on injured reserve and Falcons Team Physician Spero Karas performed reconstructive knee surgery. The surgery was filmed and shown on HBO series Hard Knocks as the opening segment on the 3rd episode of the 2014 season. On August 24, 2015, the Falcons released Spruill.

=== Toronto Argonauts ===
On April 4, 2016, the Toronto Argonauts of the Canadian Football League announced they had signed Spruill. Spruill was released on June 14, 2016.
