= List of Alpha Delta Pi members =

Alpha Delta Pi is an international collegiate sorority. Following is a list of notable Alpha Delta Pi members.

== Academia ==
- Irene Dillard Elliot (Nu) – first Dean of Women at the University of South Carolina; first woman to receive Ph.D. from USC
- Harriet Elliott (Phi) – Dean of Women at the North Carolina State Normal and Industrial College (now the University of North Carolina at Greensboro)
- Virginia Trotter (Alpha Eta) – former University of Georgia president

== Entertainment ==
- Kathy Bates (Alpha Zeta) – actress known for Titanic, Fried Green Tomatoes, The Waterboy, and Failure to Launch
- Alexis Bellino (Alpha Gamma) – cast member of The Real Housewives of Orange County
- Bree Boyce (Zeta Phi) – Miss South Carolina 2011
- Maggie Bridges (Zeta Omicron) – Miss Georgia 2014
- Kate Capshaw (Alpha Gamma) – actress
- Deana Carter (Alpha Kappa) – country singer
- Carrie Coon (Gamma Theta) – actress
- Julia Crane (Gamma Tau) – Miss Vermont 2018
- Jenna Day (Beta Psi) – Miss Kentucky 2013
- Cathy Deupree (Eta) – singer
- Ainsley Earhardt (Iota and Beta Epsilon) – journalist and co-host of FOX & Friends
- Monique Evans (Delta) – Miss Texas 2014
- Karen Fairchild (Kappa) – country singer; member of Little Big Town
- Nancy Grace (Delta Theta) – CNN News host
- Rachael Kirkconnell (Zeta Iota) – television personality
- Anna Kooiman (Eta Alpha) – reporter and co-host on FOX & Friends weekend
- Neva Jane Langley (Gamma Gamma) – Miss America, 1953
- Danica McKellar (Alpha Chi) – actress
- Lu Parker (Zeta Sigma) – Miss USA 1994; KTLA news correspondent
- Emily Procter (Delta Omicron) – actress
- Ali Rogers (Zeta Nu) – Miss South Carolina 2012–2013, 1st runner-up Miss America 2013
- Jean Smart (Alpha Theta) – actress
- Elle Smith (Beta Psi) – Miss Kentucky USA 2021, Miss USA 2021
- Mary Kate Wiles (Alpha Psi) – actress
- Kylie Williams (Iota) – Miss Florida 2007; contestant on Miss America: Reality Check
- Judy Woodruff (Omicron) – managing editor and anchor of PBS NewsHour

== Law ==
- Robin Davis (Gamma Kappa) – most senior justice on the Supreme Court of West Virginia
- Maud McLure Kelly (Eta) – lawyer, suffragist, activist; first woman lawyer in Alabama
- Leslie Rutledge (Delta Delta) – Arkansas Attorney General

== Literature ==
- Lauren Grandcolas (Delta) – author, passenger on United Airlines Flight 93
- Jessica Nelson North (Theta) – poet and author, editor of Poetry
- Carol Shields (Phi) – author; winner of the Pulitzer Prize for Fiction, 1995
- Orlando E. Toledo Morales (Pi) -- writer, author and essayist

== Politics ==
- Martha B. Alexander (Iota) – North Carolina General Assembly
- Kimberly Berfield (Zeta Omega) – Florida House of Representatives
- Robin Carnahan (Gamma Nu) – Missouri Secretary of State
- Louise Holland Coe (Alpha Nu) – first woman elected to the New Mexico Senate
- Karen Hughes (Alpha Zeta) –Under Secretary of State for Public Diplomacy and Public Affairs
- Jane Stinchfield Knapp (Alpha Delta) – Maine House of Representatives
- Jane Yelvington McCallum (Delta) –Secretary of State of Texas 1926, suffrage activist
- Viola Ross Napier (Adelphean) – first woman elected to the Georgia General Assembly
- Francine Irving Neff (Alpha Nu) – Treasurer of the United States
- Carol Rasco (Delta Delta) – Director of the Domestic Policy Council under President Bill Clinton from 1993 to 1996
- Jean B. Silver (Alpha Theta) – former member of Washington House of Representatives from 1983 to 1997

== Religion ==
- Alice Culler Cobb (Alpha) – Christian missionary and member of the Woman's Missionary Society of the Methodist Episcopal Church, South

== Science and medicine ==
- Sara Branham Matthews (Alpha) – senior bacteriologist for the United States Public Health Service
- Jessie Gray (Beta Zeta) – Canada's "First Lady of Surgery"
- Katherine Van Winkle Palmer (Alpha Theta) – former director of Paleontological Research Institution, first woman to receive a Ph.D. in Paleontology
- Diane Grob Schmidt (Beta Beta) – chemist, former president of American Chemical Society

== Sports ==
- Kelli Finglass (Gamma Chi) – director of the Dallas Cowboys Cheerleaders
- Natalie McGiffert (Theta Mu) – 2016 Summer Olympics for Rhythmic Gymnastic
- Sandra Palmer (Gamma Upsilon) – professional golfer
- Summer Rae (Delta Omicron) – former professional wrestler
