= Daja Dial =

American beauty pageant titleholder

- Born: Daja Breyon Dial; March 22, 1993 (age 33); Greenville, SC
- Education: Clemson University Major: Women's Leadership
- Beauty pageant titleholder
- Title: Miss Greater Carolina Teen 2010; Miss Powdersville 2011; Miss Lyman 2012; Miss Richland County 2013; Miss Fountain Inn 2014; Miss Greenville County 2015; Miss South Carolina 2015
- Hair color: Black
- Eye color: Brown
- Major competition: Miss America 2016
- Website: http://www.dialintolife.com

Daja Breyon Davidson (née Dial; born March 22, 1993) is an American beauty pageant titleholder from Spartanburg, South Carolina, who was crowned Miss South Carolina 2015. She competed for the Miss America 2016 title in September 2015 and was a Top 7 finalist. She is the third African American to be crowned Miss South Carolina.

== Pageant career ==
=== Teen pageants ===
Dial entered her first pageant in 2010 while a senior at Paul M. Dorman High School. She was in a pageant audience to support her cousin when the Director of another pageant encouraged Dial to compete herself the next weekend. Dial won the Miss Greater Carolina Teen 2010 title and competed for the Miss South Carolina Teen title on a platform of Juvenile Diabetes awareness and a vocal performance of "And I Am Telling You I'm Not Going" from the musical Dreamgirls. Dial was a Top-11 finalist for the state title.

=== Vying for Miss South Carolina ===
The next year, competing as an adult, Dial qualified for the 2011 Miss South Carolina pageant as Miss Powdersville. She competed with the platform "Type 1 & Type II Diabetes Mellitus" and a vocal performance of the Dusty Springfield song "Son of a Preacher Man" in the talent portion of the competition. She was named runner-up to winner Bree Boyce. She competed in the 2012 Miss South Carolina pageant as Miss Lyman with the platform "Type 1 & Type 2 Diabetes Mellitus" and a vocal performance in the talent portion of the competition. She was not a Top-16 semi-finalist for the state title. She competed in the 2013 Miss South Carolina pageant as Miss Richland County with the platform "Type I and Type II Diabetes Mellitus" and a pop vocal performance in the talent portion of the competition. She was named a Top 10 Finalist for the state title. Dial, a Clemson Tigers cheerleader at the time, was also named Miss Clemson University 2013. She was the first African American to win the school title.

In 2014, Dial won the Miss Fountain Inn title. She competed in the 2014 Miss South Carolina pageant with the platform "Type I and Type II Diabetes Mellitus" and a vocal performance of "Believe" in the talent portion of the competition. She won a Preliminary Talent award and was named Miss Photogenic. Dial placed second runner-up to winner Lanie Hudson.

=== Miss South Carolina 2015 ===
On February 21, 2015, Dial was crowned Miss Greenville County 2015. She entered the Miss South Carolina pageant at Columbia's Township Auditorium in June 2015 as one of 55 qualifiers for the state title. Dial's competition talent was a vocal performance of "I Believe", a song made famous by Fantasia Barrino. Her platform is "Type I and Type II Diabetes Mellitus".

Her on-stage interview question was whether "Confederate memorabilia" should be removed from South Carolina State House grounds. Dial answered, in part, "It's a new South Carolina. We have made so much progress and it's time to take it down. As Miss South Carolina, I can lead this state into a new era. And that flag being taken down is representative of that."

Dial won the competition on Saturday, June 27, 2015, when she received her crown from outgoing Miss South Carolina titleholder Lanie Hudson. She is the third African American to be crowned Miss South Carolina. She earned more than $10,000 in scholarship money and other prizes from the state pageant. As Miss South Carolina, her activities include public appearances across the state of South Carolina.

=== Vying for Miss America ===
Dial was South Carolina's representative at the Miss America 2016 pageant in Atlantic City, New Jersey, in September 2015. In preliminary swimsuit competition, Dial won a "lifestyle and fitness" scholarship of $1,000. In the televised finale on September 13, 2015, she sang Fantasia Barrino's "I Believe" during the talent portion of the competition. During the interview portion, she was asked about banning "military-style assault weapons". Dial placed in the Top 7 finalists as earned a $7,000 scholarship award.

== Personal life and education ==
Dial is a native of Jonesville, South Carolina, and a 2011 graduate of Paul M. Dorman High School in Roebuck, South Carolina. Her father is Darrell Dial and her mother is Annette Goodwin.

As of 2011 Dial was a student at Clemson University where she was majoring in health administration.

Awards and achievements
Preceded by Lanie Hudson	Miss South Carolina; 2015	Succeeded by Rachel Wyatt
