= Kristie =

Kristie is a given name. Notable people with the name include:

- Kristie Ahn (born 1992), American former professional tennis player
- Kristie Boering (born 1963), Professor of Earth and Planetary Science at University of California, Berkeley, US
- Kristie Boogert (born 1973), professional female tennis player from the Netherlands
- Kristie Canegallo, Deputy White House Chief of Staff for Implementation for former US President Barack Obama
- Kristie Ebi, American epidemiologist whose primary focus is the impact of global warming on human health
- Kristie Fiegen, Republican politician from South Dakota, Vice Chairman of the South Dakota Public Utilities Commission
- Kristie Fox (born 1985), American former collegiate All-American softball shortstop, head coach for UNLV Rebels softball team
- Kristie Greene (born 1970), American beauty pageant titleholder named Miss South Carolina 1994
- Kristie Jandric, Australian actress and model
- Kristie Johnston (born 1980), Australian politician
- Kristie Kenney, former senior U.S. diplomat, the 32nd Counselor of the United States Department of State
- Kristie Kreuk or Kristin Kreuk (born 1982), Canadian actress
- Kristie Macosko Krieger, American film producer
- Kristie Macrakis (1958–2022), American historian of science, author, and professor at the Georgia Institute of Technology
- Kristie Marano (born 1979), wrestler from Albany, New York
- Kristie Marsden (born 1982), Canadian actress from British Columbia
- Kristie Mewis (born 1991), American professional soccer player
- Kristie Moore (born 1979), Canadian curler from Sexsmith, Alberta
- Kristie Peterson (born 1955), ProRodeo Hall of Fame barrel racer
- Kristie Phillips (born 1972), retired American elite gymnast
- Kristie Reeves, German actress, musical theater performer and producer
- Kristie-Anne Ryder (born 1990), Australian judoka, half-lightweight category
- Kristie Smith (born 1988), Australian professional golfer
- Kristie Lu Stout (born 1974), American journalist and news anchor for CNN International

== See also ==
- Death of Kristie Fischer in Thornwood, New York
