= Fine Arts Center (South Carolina) =

Arts high school in Greenville, South Carolina

Coordinates: 34°53′13″N 82°21′25″W

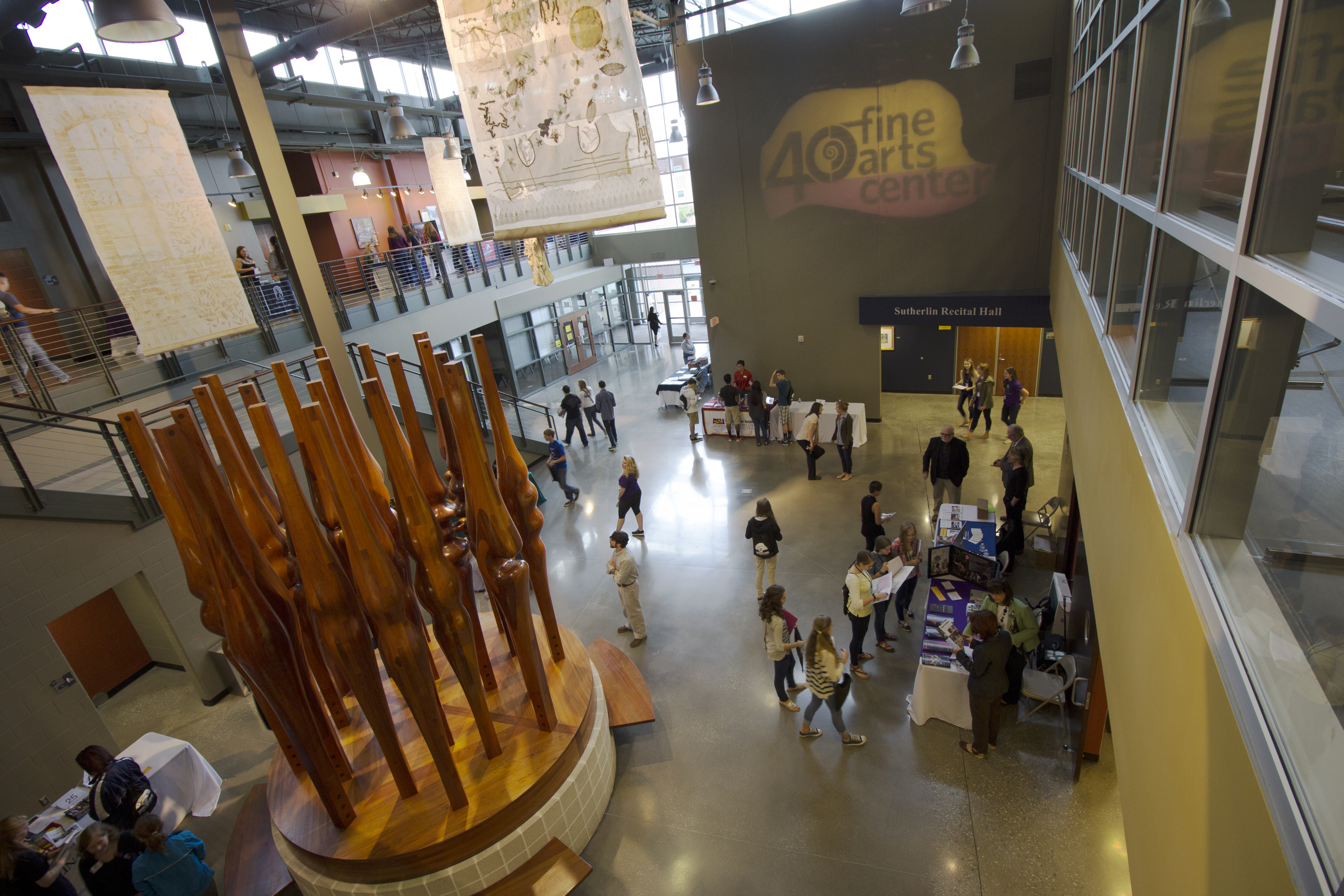
Fine Arts Center of Greenville, South Carolina

The Fine Arts Center of Greenville, South Carolina (The "FAC") was established in August 1974 as the first specialized arts school in the state of South Carolina. Classes are available at the Center for students to study theatre, music, visual arts, dance, creative writing, and film and video production. The Fine Arts Center provides arts instruction to artistically talented students who desire an intense pre-professional program of study. Students spend a minimum of 110 minutes in either the morning or afternoon five days a week at the Fine Arts Center and spend the remainder of their time on academic work at an area high school. Around 300 students attend the Fine Arts Center each year, and more than 90% of graduates go on to higher education. The Fine Arts Center moved from its former location at 1613 W. Washington St. to its new facility at 102 Pine Knoll Drive.

== Alumni ==
Former students include:

- Kimilee Bryant - actress, singer and former Miss South Carolina
- Kelly McCorkle - Miss South Carolina 2002 and placed in the Top 15 at the Miss America 2003
- Rory Scovel - comedian, writer and actor
- Marcus King - GRAMMY award-nominated singer, songwriter, and guitarist
