= Miss South Carolina Teen =

Youth beauty pageant in South Carolina, United States

Miss South Carolina’s Teen
- Formation: 2001
- Type: Beauty pageant
- Location: Columbia, South Carolina
- Members: Miss America's Teen
- Official language: English
- Key people: Daja Dial Davidson
- Website: Official website

The Miss South Carolina’s Teen competition is the pageant that selects the representative for the U.S. state of South Carolina in the Miss America's Teen pageant. Miss South Carolina’s Teen pageant is held the same week as Miss South Carolina, usually occurring during the last weekend in June at the Township Auditorium in Columbia, South Carolina.

Logan Wells of Columbia was crowned Miss South Carolina’s Teen on June 19, 2026, at the Township Auditorium in Columbia, South Carolina. She competed for the title of Miss America's Teen 2027 on September 5, 2026, at the Kravis Center for the Performing Arts in West Palm Beach, Florida, where she placed as 4th Runner-Up.

== Results summary ==
The following is a visual summary of the past results of Miss South Carolina’s Teen titleholders presented in the table below. The year in parentheses indicates year of the Miss America's Teen competition in which the placement and/or award was garnered.

=== Placements ===
- Miss America's Teen: Taylor Fitch (2009), Rachel Wyatt (2013), Tess Ferm (2026)
- 4th runner-up: Logan Wells (2027)
- Top 9: Berkley Bryant (2019)
- Top 10: Maggie Hill (2007), Ali Rogers (2010), Sarah Hamrick (2016), Kellan Finnegan (2020)
- Top 11: Dabria Aguilar (2022)
- Top 15: Lindley Mayer (2006)

=== Awards ===
==== Preliminary awards ====
- Preliminary Evening Wear/On-Stage Question: Sarah Hamrick (2016)
- Preliminary Talent: Maggie Hill (2007)

==== Other awards ====
- Children's Miracle Network (CMN) Miracle Maker Award: Berkley Bryant (2019)
- National Fundraiser 2nd Runner-up: Piper Holt (2023)
- Outstanding Achievement in Academic Life: Brook Sill (2014)
- Scholastic Excellence Award: Sarah Hamrick (2016), Makayla Stark (2017), Kellan Fenegan (2020)
- Teens in Action Award Finalists: Kellan Fenegan (2020), Logan Wells (2027)
- Top Advertisement Sales: Dabria Aguilar (2022) (tie)
- Top Dance Talent Award: Dabria Aguilar (2022)
- Teens in Action Award Winner: Tess Ferm (2026)

== Winners ==
- Declared as Winner
- Ended as a runner-up
- Ended as a finalist or semi-finalist

Year	Name	Hometown	Age	Local title	Talent	Placement at MAO Teen	Special scholarships at MAO Teen	Notes
2026	Logan Wells	Columbia	17	Miss Palmetto’s Teen	Dance	4th runner-up	Teens in Action Award Finalist	
2025	LilyKate Barbare	Greer	17	Miss Greer High School's Teen	Dance	Did not compete; originally 1st runner-up, later assumed the title when Ferm won Miss America's Teen 2026		
2025	Tess Ferm	Charleston	18	Miss Charleston's Teen	Vocal, "Tomorrow" from Annie	Winner	Teens in Action Winner	Previously Miss South Carolina Teen Volunteer 2023, placing 3rd runner-up at Miss Teen Volunteer America 2024.
2024	Mary Elle Marchant	Lexington	18	Miss River Bluff's Teen	Lyrical Dance			
2023	Margaret Turner	Greenwood	16	Miss Lakeland Teen	Jazz Dance			Previously Miss Jr. High School America 2021
2022	Piper Holt	Fountain Inn	17	Miss Clemson Teen	Jazz Dance "Canned Heat"		National Fundraiser Award 2nd runner-up	Previously Top 10 (2021) as Piedmont Teen
2021	Dabria Aguilar	Hanahan	17	Miss Capital City Teen	Contemporary Ballet Dance	Top 11	Top Advertisement Sales (tie) Top Dance Talent Award	
2019-20	Kellan Fenegan	Lexington	16	Miss Columbia Teen	Vocal, "In My Dreams"	Top 10	Scholastic Excellence Award Teens in Action Award Finalist	
2018	Berkley Bryant	Anderson	17	Miss River City Teen	Tap Dance, "Runaway Baby"	Top 9	CMN Miracle Maker Award	Later Miss Volunteer America 2025; Miss South Carolina Volunteer 2024; Later Miss Florence 2022 and Miss Clemson 2023; 1st runner-up at Miss South Carolina 2022, 3rd runner-up at Miss South Carolina 2023.
2017	Ally McCaslin	Simpsonville	16	Miss Woodmont High School Teen	Vocal, “Journey to the Past” from Anastasia			
2016	Makayla Stark	Inman	17	Miss Clemson Teen	Clogging, "Great Balls of Fire"		Scholastic Excellence Award	
2015	Sarah Hamrick	Cowpens	17	Miss Hilton Head Island Teen	Vocal, "Live Out Loud”	Top 10	Preliminary Evening Wear/OSQ Award Scholastic Excellence Award	First Asian American Miss South Carolina Teen Later contestant on season 26 of The Bachelor
2014	Hope Harvard	Easley	16	Miss Greater Easley Teen	Dance en pointe, "Supercalifragilisticexpialidocious" from Mary Poppins			
2013	Brook Sill	Duncan	16	Miss Mauldin Teen	Contemporary Jazz Dance, "Girl on Fire"		Outstanding Achievement in Academic Life	Cousin of Miss South Carolina Teen 2012, Sydney Sill
2012	Sydney Sill	Duncan	16	Miss Greater Greer Teen		N/A		Cousin of Miss South Carolina Teen 2013, Brook Sill Assumed title when Wyatt was named Miss America's Outstanding Teen 2013 1st runner-up at Miss South Carolina 2017 pageant 2nd runner-up at Miss South Carolina 2018 pageant 1st runner-up at Miss South Carolina USA 2019 and 2020 pageants
2012	Rachel Wyatt	Piedmont	17	Miss Greater Mauldin Teen	Dance	Winner		Later Miss South Carolina 2016; 1st runner-up at Miss America 2017 pageant Currently a Dallas Cowboys Cheerleader
2011	Caitlen Patton	Summerville	17	Miss Columbia Teen	Vocal			
2010	Caroline Blanton	Conway	15	Miss Myrtle Beach Teen	Vocal			
2009	Ali Rogers	Laurens	17	Miss Laurens County Teen	Piano, "In the Mood"	Top 10		Later Miss South Carolina 2012; 1st runner-up at Miss America 2013 pageant
2008	Courtney Cisson	Greenville	17	Miss Powdersville Teen		N/A		Half-sister of Miss South Carolina 2002, Kelly McCorkle Assumed title when Fitch was named Miss America's Outstanding Teen 2009
2008	Taylor Fitch	Anderson	17	Miss Upstate Teen	Musical Theater Dance	Winner		
2007	Lauren Lytle	Boiling Springs	17	Miss Greenville Teen	Vocal			
2006	Maggie Hill	Gilbert	17	Miss Lexington Teen	Vocal	Top 10	Preliminary Talent Award	
2005	Lindley Mayer	Greenville	16	Miss Upstate Teen	Dance	Top 15		1st runner-up at Miss South Carolina 2013 pageant Later Miss South Carolina United States 2016 Has appeared in The Hunger Games: Catching Fire, Dirty Dancing, Bunheads, Glee, and The Walking Dead
2004	Brooke Rauscher	Lexington	14	Miss Columbia Teen	Lyrical Ballet, “Here Without You” by Three Doors Down	No national pageant		
2003	Shelley Bryson Benthall	Florence		Miss Florence County Teen	Vocal	No national pageant		Later Miss South Carolina 2006
2002	Danielle Wilson	Columbia		Miss Columbia Teen	Dance	No national pageant		2nd runner-up at Miss South Carolina 2008 pageant
2001	Kathryn Lynn Stoudenmire	Greer		Miss Lower State Carolina Teen		No national pageant		
