= Senator Ritchie =

Senator Ritchie may refer to:

- James H. Ritchie Jr. (born 1961), South Carolina State Senate
- Patty Ritchie (born 1962), New York State Senate
