= Alicia Leeke =

American painter

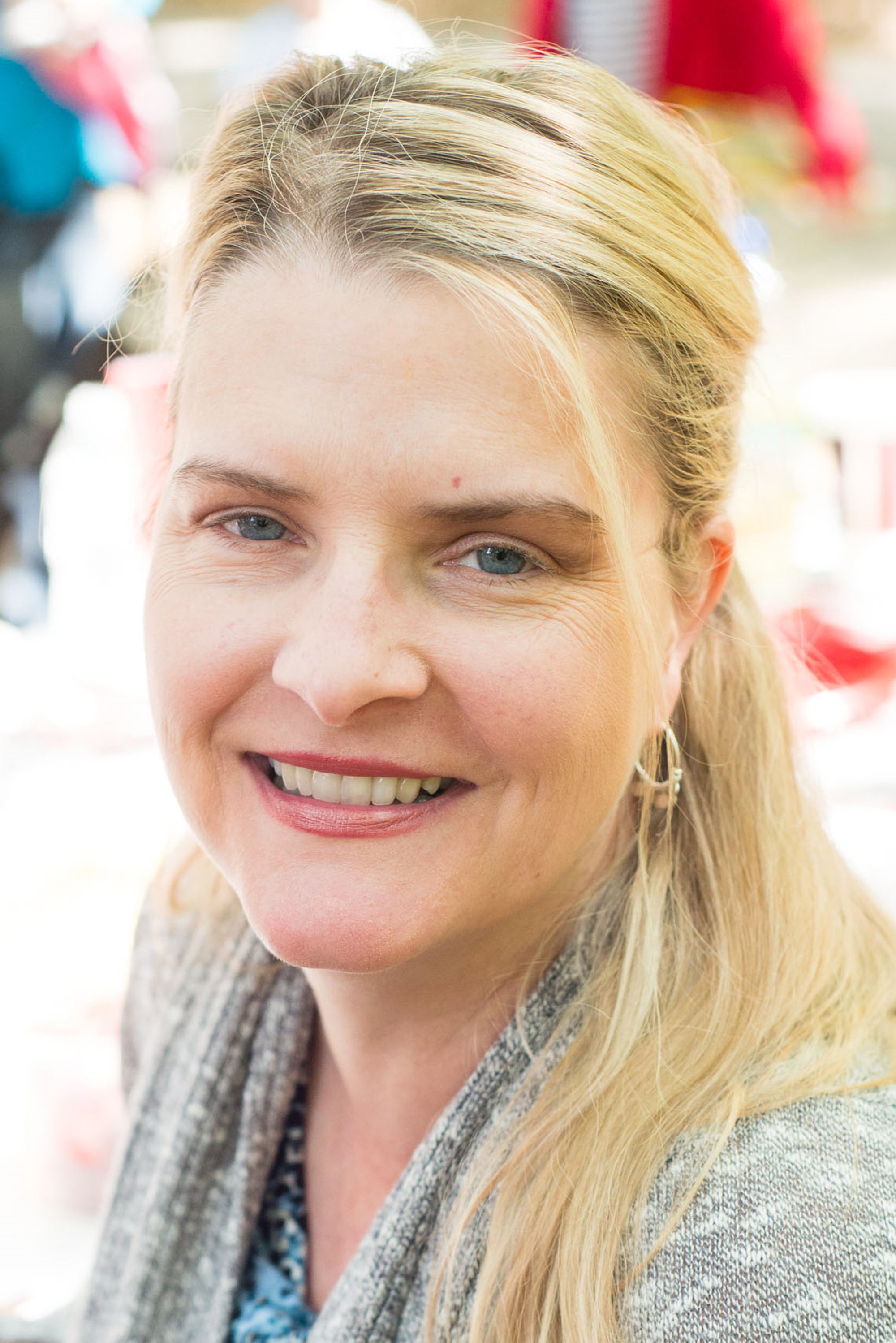
- Photograph by John E. Powell
- Born: South Carolina
- Education: Columbia College (art), University of South Carolina (B.A. journalism)
- Known for: Painting and digital mixed media
- Movement: Post-Impressionistic
- Website: www.alicialeeke.com

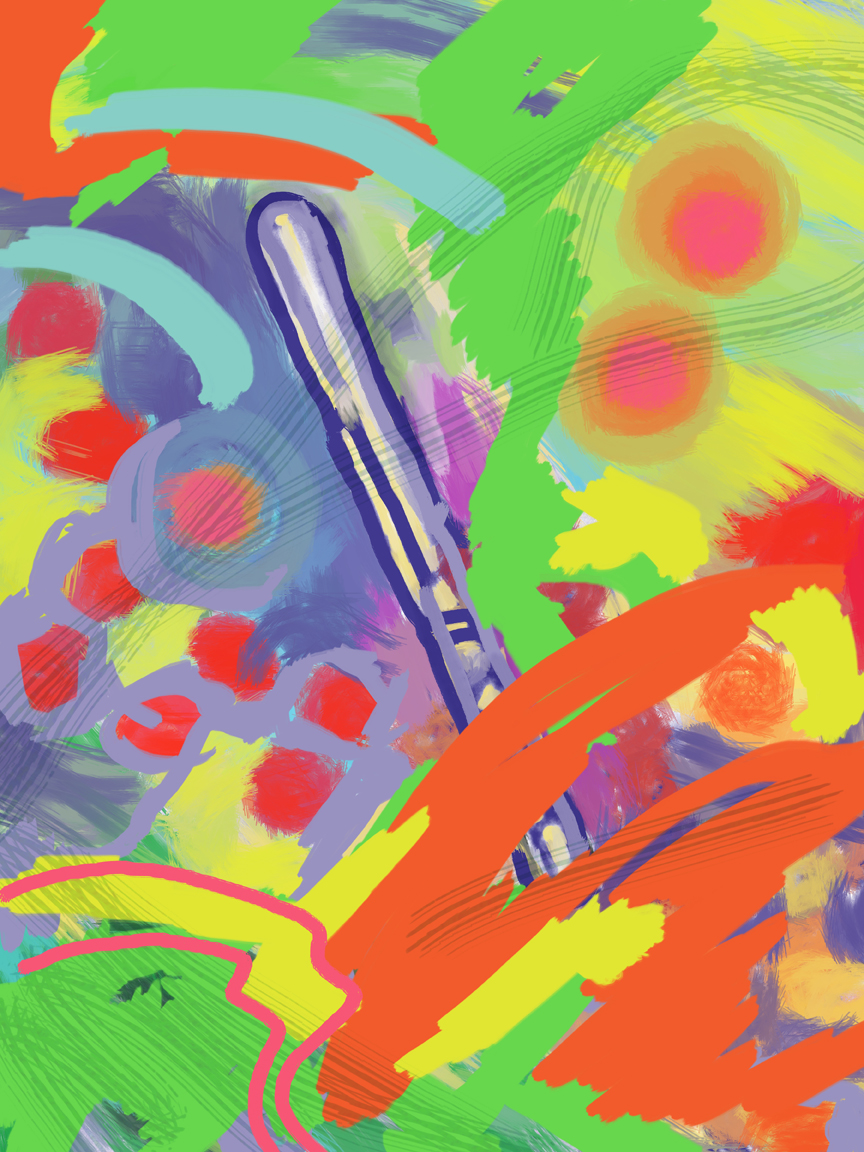
Alicia Leeke, Achnanthidium duthiei

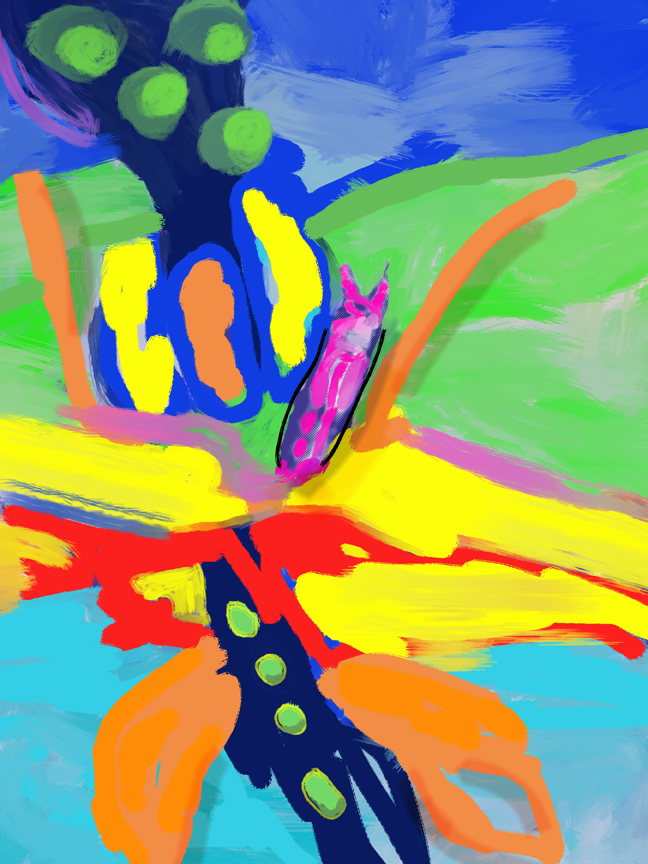
Alicia Leeke, Oedogonium

Alicia Leeke, a native South Carolinian, is a painter and artist working in Columbia and Charleston, South Carolina. She first became known for her Post-Impressionistic style and incorporation of Fauvism. Her artwork is distinctive for its dry brush painting technique, gentle distortion of linear perspective, and use of thick line and brush strokes.

She became widely known for her curated exhibition, View From Under the Microscope, which uses phytoplankton to garner awareness about climate change and ocean acidification.

== Early life ==
Leeke was born in Columbia, South Carolina. She began her education at Columbia College, an all-girls, private liberal arts school, to study biology in hopes of becoming a veterinarian.

During her second year she vacationed in Paris and visited the Louvre, where she fell in love with the French Impressionists and solidified her passion for painting. She also visited her most inspiring spot in France, Montmartre. She later transferred to the University of South Carolina where she earned a Bachelor of Arts degree in journalism.

Upon graduation, she worked in computer graphics and went on to work for six years at the South Carolina Department of Health and Environmental Control as the Art Director. Leeke then worked at General Binding Corporation (GBC) in outside sales. Just a year after her employment at GBC, she began taking art classes again at the Columbia Museum of Art and used her spare time off work to attend art shows and sell work in Atlanta and Chicago. She also studied under Virginia Anderson and Ginger Munnerlin. Inspired by the French Impressionist masters, she further developed her own loose, abstract style. She was named by Charlotte's Red Sky Gallery as an Emerging Artist in 2006.

In the summer of 2008, she experimented with her palette by using a technique known as Color Field painting and began painting city and landscapes in bright, vibrant colors. She developed a brushstroke style, using acrylics in a way to give the appearance of oils and included "intense black lines."

Her company underwent a merger in 2008 and she took the opportunity to embark on her dream of becoming a full-time, self-supporting artist.

== Art career ==
Leeke compares a series of art in a body of work to that of multiple product lines in sales. She has paintings produced in a series over time including: abstracts, landscapes, cityscapes, and the most recent conceptual works in digital media.

Her travels to paint landscapes during plein air painting sessions led her to produce a body of beautiful abstract paintings inspired by nature's ever-changing scenery. Although some paintings may take up to a year, she generally prefers to make a painting alla prima, all in one sitting.

More recently, she is inspired by photographers Susan kae Grant of Texas and John E. Powell of Columbia, SC to produce a body of work combining conceptual art, photography and digital mixed media.

Leeke has also painted and marketed silk scarves and other consumer products, such as mouse pads, coloring books, and greeting cards. Leeke has been invited to exhibit her art in New York, Chicago, Atlanta and has art collectors around the globe.

=== Subject, themes, and methods ===
While the majority of her art involves abstract cityscapes and landscapes, she also focuses on conceptual and science-based work.

==== Conceptual work ====
In 2014, she worked on a series of digital mixed media works that address the issues of consumerism and manufacturing excess by society's overconsumption. Leeke's concept for the show was to encourage consumers to choose more wisely and spend more for quality merchandise versus throwing it away.

==== Science-based work ====
Other themes explored in her work are based on science and biology. Leeke was awarded a grant by the Charleston Scientific and Cultural Education Fund to produce a traveling exhibition in 2015 entitled: View from Under the Microscope: Science-based Learning Through Art. The exhibition consists of 18 vibrant, digitally created paintings that educate the non-scientific community about the importance phytoplankton play in relation to all living things on the planet and the need to maintain healthy, sustainable oceans and water bodies.

=== Influence ===
Leeke's work is inspired by South Carolina's coastal landscape as well as Columbia landmarks, New York, Paris and Venice. The quaint street scenes and sprawling landscapes found in her paintings strive to capture the essence of common events and convert them into lively images of color and movement. During her second trip to Montmartre, France in 2009, Leeke developed an interest in Fauvism and began to incorporate intense black lines into her work.

Leeke's visits to Europe served as inspiration for many of her works. Her Columbia cityscapes often have the charming appeal of street scenes in Paris, like the painting, Nonnah's, in which she captures Columbia's vista and Paris' personality.

She has been influenced by the works of French Impressionist masters, such as Henri de Toulouse-Lautrec, Maurice Utrillo, Georges Rouault, Edgar Degas, Édouard Manet, Claude Monet, Pierre-Auguste Renoir, and Piet Mondrian. She was inspired by the way they conveyed social conscience, history and architecture.
