= Dorman High School =

Location
- 1050 Cavalier Way; Roebuck, South Carolina 29376; United States; 34°50′57″N 81°58′17″W

Information
- Type: Public
- Motto: Virtus in Arduis
- Established: 1964
- School district: Spartanburg County School District 6
- Principal: Dr. Joshua Dawkins
- Staff: 218.42 (FTE)
- Enrollment: 3,925 (2023-2024)
- Student to teacher ratio: 17.97
- Colors: Navy blue, Columbia blue, and white
- Team name: Cavaliers
- Website: dhs.spart6.org

Paul M. Dorman High School is a public high school located in unincorporated Spartanburg County, South Carolina, United States. It is the only comprehensive high school in Spartanburg County School District 6. It has a Roebuck post office address; neither campus is in the Roebuck census-designated place.

It consists of a main campus for 10th-12th graders and a separate campus for 9th graders, and a College, Career, and Fine Arts Center. The center features an auditorium, multiple classrooms, an art gallery, kitchen, student center, and computer labs. The campus is located at the intersection of Interstate 26 and Highway 221 in Spartanburg County.

Cavalier Stadium (2006)

Paula Kirkland Arena (2006)

== History ==
Dorman High School opened its doors to students on August 17, 1964. The then new high school consolidated Roebuck and Fairforest high schools.

On March 29, 1985, a fifteen year old freshman came to school with a loaded .38-caliber Colt revolver. Then teacher, Ms. Peggy Larson, who taught algebra, suspected one of her students of drinking and attempted to take him to the school's principal's office. The student then broke away and fled out a side door to his home. This student then returned to the school later the same day with his gun, and held four students hostage inside a classroom.

The incident lasted until a local pastor stepped into the classroom to talk down the student. The student was arrested, charged with four counts of kidnapping, and was then sent to Columbia for a psychological evaluation. After that, the student was then sent to then Spartanburg General Hospital, now called Spartanburg Regional, psychiatric's unit. After being released, the student was placed on probation until his 21st birthday, as well as being barred from being on school grounds, or intimidating the victims of this incident. Due to the student's age, as he was a minor, his name was not released.

== Stadium ==
Dorman High School hosts an athletic stadium named Cavalier Stadium that is owned and operated by Spartanburg County School District Six. It opened in the fall of 2002 after the relocation of the old Dorman high school onto a new 450 acre campus in a natural ravine behind the main building. The largest crowd seen at Cavalier Stadium was 15,800. In 2002 attendance reached over 10,000 for the opening game against Mauldin High School, the 2002 game against Byrnes High School, and the game against Spartanburg High School. Notable for its size, it was completed with all of its amenities at an estimated cost of US$8 million, though that number is still debated.

== Athletics ==
=== State Championships ===
- Baseball: 1971, 2018
- Basketball–Boys: 2017, 2018, 2019, 2020, 2023
- Basketball–Girls: 2003, 2004, 2005
- Competitive Cheer: 2006, 2007
- Cross Country–Boys: 2002, 2008, 2017, 2018, 2019, 2020, 2023
- Cross Country–Girls: 2004, 2010, 2018
- Football: 2000, 2009
- Golf–Boys: 1998, 1999, 2007, 2008
- Golf–Girls: 2000, 2002, 2015
- Lacrosse–Boys: 2026
- Soccer–Boys: 2001
- Soccer–Girls: 2006
- Tennis–Boys: 2011
- Track–Boys: 2006, 2007, 2010, 2016, 2020
- Track–Girls: 2010
- Volleyball–Girls: 1990, 1991, 1992, 1995, 1996, 1997, 2000, 2001, 2003, 2004, 2009, 2016, 2017, 2021, 2023, 2024, 2025
- Volleyball–Boys: 2023, 2024, 2025
- Wrestling: 2016

== Notable alumni ==
- J. J. Arcega-Whiteside (Class of 2015) – NFL wide receiver
- Lee Bright (Class of 1988) – former South Carolina State Senator
- Amber Brock (Class of 1998) – American author
- Toy Caldwell (Class of 1966) – musician and founding member of the Spartanburg-based Marshall Tucker Band
- Noah Clowney (Class of 2022) – professional basketball player
- Daja Dial (Class of 2011) – Miss South Carolina 2015
- PJ Hall (Class of 2020) – basketball player
- Terry Hughes (Class of 1967) – MLB third baseman
- Adam Humphries (Class of 2011) – NFL wide receiver
- Brian Lawson (Class of 1991) – businessman
- Shane Martin (Class of 1990) – member of the South Carolina Senate
- Jordan McFadden (Class of 2018) – NFL offensive lineman
- Charone Peake (Class of 2011) – NFL wide receiver
- Marcus Rowland (Class of 2008) – track and field sprinter, South Carolina High School 100 meter dash record holder
- Ryan Sims (Class of 1998) – NFL defensive lineman and All-American in college for the North Carolina Tar Heels
- Brandon Thomas (Class of 2009) – NFL offensive lineman
- Steven Tolleson (Class of 2002) – MLB infielder
- D. J. Trahan (Class of 1999) – professional golfer on PGA Tour

== See also ==
- List of high schools in South Carolina
