= Griffith Thompson Pugh Sr. =

Dr. Griffith Thompson Pugh Sr. was a former President and Academic Administrator of Columbia College in South Carolina, United States. He served in this capacity from 1916 to 1920, and received his bachelor's degree from Wofford College, his Doctorate from Vanderbilt University. His predecessor was William W. Daniel (1900–1916), and his successor was J. Caldwell Guilds (1920–1948).

Pugh was also a geologist and wrote "Pleistocene Deposits of South Carolina" a thesis with an especial attempt at ascertaining what must have been the environmental conditions under which the Pleistocene Mollusca of the state lived. His thesis for the degree of Doctor of Philosophy was submitted to the faculty at Vanderbilt University in Nashville, TN in 1905.
