= Jane Herlong =

Jane Jenkins Herlong
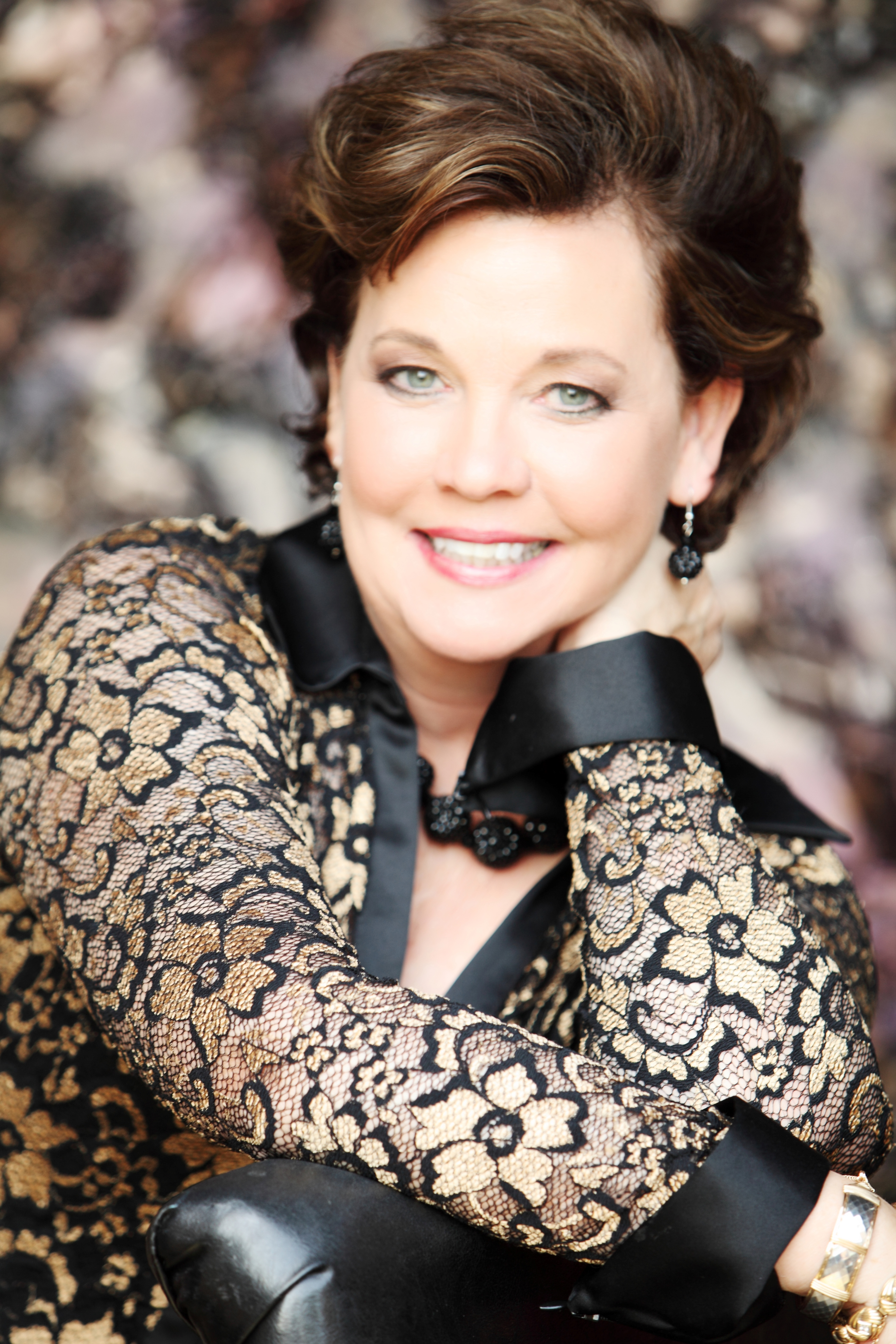
- Born: Jane Jenkins
- Education: Columbia College
- Occupations: Humorist, author and speaker
- Title: Miss South Carolina 1979
- Awards: Miss South Carolina 1979 (Winner)
- Website: www.janeherlong.com

Jane Jenkins Herlong is an American humorist, author, speaker and the winner of the Miss South Carolina 1979 pageant.

== Early life and education ==
Herlong participated in a local beauty pageant while she was in high school. After taking first place, she continued to participate in beauty pageants, eventually becoming Miss South Carolina at age 23 and then going on to compete in the nationwide Miss America pageant. She attended Columbia College in South Carolina. Herlong began speaking to students at local schools, which inspired her to create her first musical motivational program.

== Career ==
When Herlong's children were young, she began to seek out ways to work closer to home, this was the catalyst for her first book, Bare Feet to High Heels: You Don't Have to Be a Beauty Queen to Be a Beautiful Person. Self-published, the book chronicles her journey from a tomato farm to Miss America with wit, wisdom, and humor. Herlong's career expanded from local to national and international stages, speaking in New Zealand and Germany. Her growing renown earned her an invitation to sing the national anthem, which led to performances at College Bowl games, professional baseball and basketball games, and even Radio City Music Hall.

When her sister was diagnosed with breast cancer, Herlong self-published another book. What Ta-Tas Teach Us is an illustrated, inspirational humor book. The book was received attention from select news outlets and a portion of the profits are donated to support breast cancer research.

Bury Me with My Pearls, her third book, was written in memory of Herlong's mother. The Amazon bestseller catalogues the hilarious and sometimes questionable advice her mother offered her throughout her life.

In 2016, Herlong was named a Woman of Distinction by Elysian Magazine and later in the year received Speakers Hall of Fame Award. Her book, Rhinestones on My Flip-Flops: Choosing Extravagant Joy in the Midst of Everyday Mess-Ups, is scheduled for release in September 2017 by FaithWords, a division of the Hachette Book Group.

== Personal life ==
Herlong serves as Executive Vice-chair of the Board at Piedmont Technical College of South Carolina, former Chair of the National Speakers Association Scholarship Committee, and a Foundation Trustee at the National Speakers Association. She is also a 2007 Presidential Medal recipient. Herlong is a wife and mother, and lives with her family on a peach farm in Edgefield County, South Carolina.

== Selected bibliography ==
- Herlong, Jane Jenkins (September 26, 2017). Rhinestones on My Flip-Flops: Choosing Extravagant Joy in the Midst of Everyday Mess-Ups. FaithWords. ISBN 9781478974338.
- CSP, Jane Jenkins Herlong (April 30, 2015). Bury Me with My Pearls. Lighthouse Publishing of the Carolinas. ISBN 9781938499333.
- Herlong, Jane Jenkins (June 22, 2012). What Ta-Tas Teach Us: Volume 1. Speaking From the Heart. ISBN 9780971146716.
- Herlong, Jane Jenkins (2001). Bare feet to high heels: You don't have to be a beauty queen to be a beautiful person. Jane Jenkins Herlong. ISBN 9780971146709.
