= Brandon Thomas (American football) =

American gridiron football player and coach (born 1991)

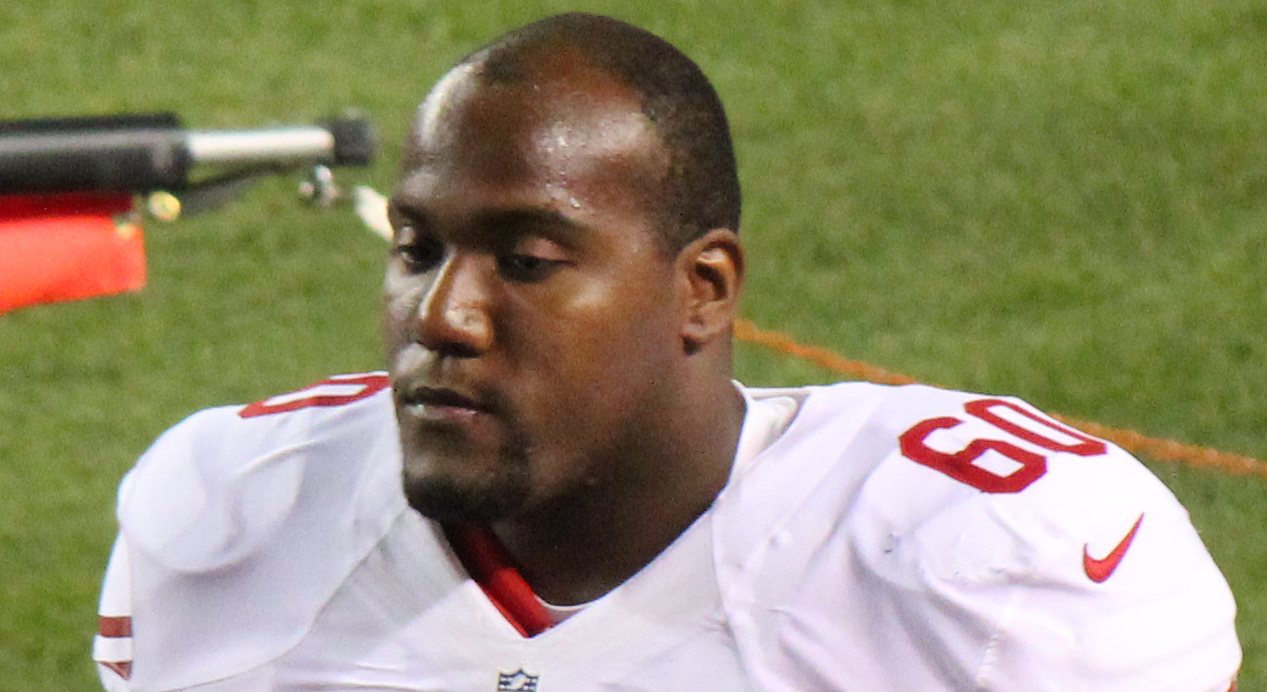
- Thomas with the San Francisco 49ers in 2015

Clemson Tigers
- Title: Graduate assistant

Personal information
- Born: February 18, 1991 (age 35); Spartanburg, South Carolina, U.S.
- Listed height: 6 ft 3 in (1.91 m)
- Listed weight: 317 lb (144 kg)

Career information
- High school: Paul M. Dorman (Roebuck, South Carolina)
- College: Clemson
- NFL draft: 2014: 3rd round, 100th overall pick

Career history

Playing
- San Francisco 49ers (2014–2015); Detroit Lions (2016–2017)*; Jacksonville Jaguars (2017–2019)
- * Offseason or practice squad member only

Coaching
- Clemson (2022–present) Graduate assistant

Awards and highlights
- First-team All-ACC (2012); Second-team All-ACC (2013)
- Stats at Pro Football Reference

Brandon Thomas (born February 18, 1991) is an American former professional football player who was an offensive guard in the National Football League (NFL). He played college football for the Clemson Tigers and was selected by the San Francisco 49ers in the third round of the 2014 NFL draft. After his playing career, Thomas became an offensive graduate assistant for Clemson.

== Early life ==
Thomas attended Paul M. Dorman High School in Roebuck, South Carolina.

As a four-star recruit by the Rivals.com rating service, he was rated as the 14th best offensive tackle prospect in his class.

== College career ==
Thomas attended Clemson University from 2009 to 2013. He saw a lot of playing time at both guard and tackle during his career, and became the starting left tackle for the Tigers in 2012, where he started 26 games over his last two seasons. He was named a first-team All-Atlantic Coast Conference (ACC) as a junior, and was a second-team All-ACC selection as a senior.

== Professional career ==
=== Pre-draft ===
On December 16, 2013, it was announced that Thomas had accepted his invitation to play in the 2014 Senior Bowl. On January 25, 2014, he played in the Reese's Senior Bowl, asapart of Atlanta Falcons head coach Mike Smith's North team that lost 20–10 to the South. Thomas was one of 50 collegiate offensive linemen to attend the NFL Scouting Combine in Indianapolis, Indiana. He performed all of the combine drills and ran the ninth fastest 40-yard dash among all offensive linemen and had the fifth best vertical jump. On March 6, 2014, Thomas attended Clemson's pro day, along with Tajh Boyd, Martavis Bryant, Sammy Watkins, Tyler Shatley, Chandler Catanzaro, Bashaud Breeland, and eight others. He opted to perform positional drills and bested his combine numbers in the broad jump (8'3"), short shuttle (4.75s), and three-cone drill (7.83s). On April 3, 2014, Thomas suffered a torn ACL while performing a non-contact drill at a private workout he was attending with the New Orleans Saints. At the conclusion of the pre-draft process, Thomas was projected by NFL draft experts and scouts to be a third to fifth round pick. He was ranked the tenth best offensive guard prospect in the draft by NFLDraftScout.com.

Pre-draft measurables
Height	Weight	Arm length	Hand span	Wingspan	40-yard dash	10-yard split	20-yard split	20-yard shuttle	Three-cone drill	Vertical jump	Broad jump	Bench press
6 ft 3 1/4 in (1.91 m)	317 lb (144 kg)	34 3/4 in (0.88 m)	10 1/2 in (0.27 m)	6 ft 11 5/8 in (2.12 m)	5.09 s	1.88 s	3.03 s	4.75 s	7.83 s	29 in (0.74 m)	8 ft 3 in (2.51 m)	35 reps
All values from NFL Combine/Pro Day

=== San Francisco 49ers ===
==== 2014 ====
The San Francisco 49ers selected Thomas in the third round (100th overall) of the 2014 NFL draft. He was the eighth offensive guard and 22nd offensive linemen selected in 2014. On May 31, 2014, 49ers signed Thomas to a four-year, $2.72 million contract that includes a signing bonus of $506,016. He spent the entire 2014 season on the reserve/non-football injury list due to the ACL injury suffered before the draft.

==== 2015 ====
Throughout training camp, Thomas competed against Ian Silberman, Joe Looney, Andrew Tiller, and Jordan Devey for the job as the starting left guard, left vacant by the departure of Mike Iupati to the Arizona Cardinals in free agency. Head coach Jim Tomsula named him the backup right guard to Devey to start the regular season. He was inactive for all 16 games in 2015.

=== Detroit Lions ===
On August 29, 2016, the 49ers traded Thomas to the Detroit Lions in exchange for wide receiver Jeremy Kerley.

On September 3, 2016, he was waived by the Lions and was signed to the practice squad the next day. He signed a reserve/future contract with the Lions on January 9, 2017.

On September 3, 2017, Thomas was waived by the Lions. He was signed to the practice squad on October 3, 2017. He was released on October 14, 2017.

=== Jacksonville Jaguars ===
On October 23, 2017, Thomas was signed to the Jacksonville Jaguars' practice squad. He was released on November 23, 2017, but was re-signed four days later. He signed a reserve/future contract with the Jaguars on January 22, 2018.

On July 31, 2018, Thomas was waived/injured by the Jaguars and was placed on injured reserve. He was released on August 4, 2018. He was re-signed to the practice squad on October 16, 2018. He was promoted to the active roster on December 22, 2018.

On December 10, 2019, Thomas was placed on injured reserve.

== Coaching career ==
In 2022, Thomas began his coaching career when he joined the staff at his alma mater, Clemson, as an offensive graduate assistant.
