= Kimilee Bryant =

American actress and singer

- Born: June 22, 1969 (age 57); Berea, South Carolina

Kimilee Karyn Bryant (born June 22, 1969) is an American actress, singer and former Miss South Carolina. Bryant is best known for playing the role of Christine Daaé in the Broadway and other productions of The Phantom of the Opera, and later the role of Carlotta in the same musical. She has sung at Lincoln Center's Avery Fisher Hall and played many roles in U.S. regional theatres and opera, including at New York City Center with the New York Gilbert and Sullivan Players. She has also performed in cabaret, film and television.

== Early years ==
Bryant grew up in Berea near Greenville, South Carolina, the daughter of dance teacher Karen C. Bryant. She attended Travelers Rest High School and Converse College, where she earned a Bachelor of Music degree. She was Miss South Carolina in 1989, and at the Miss America 1990 pageant she won talent scholarships. She then studied at Manhattan School of Music, where she earned a Master's Degree in vocal performance in 1992 and studied with Mignon Dunn. Bryant also studied voice at Greenville's Fine Arts Center and the South Carolina Governor's School of the Arts. She studied dance at Broadway Dance Center and acting with Terry Schreiber at the T. Schreiber Studio in New York City. Bryant was a regional Metropolitan Opera Auditions winner (1998).

== Concerts, Broadway and Off-Broadway ==
Bryant debuted as a soprano soloist with The National Chorale at Avery Fisher Hall. She was also a soloist in a staged production of Handel's Messiah at Lincoln Center and at The Utrecht Early Music Festival in the Netherlands (2000), among other concert engagements.

Bryant played Christine Daaé in the Broadway (1994–95; 1998; 2009–2012 occasionally), Swiss (in German; 1995–96), U.S. National Tour (1996–98) and Toronto (1999) productions of The Phantom of the Opera. The Sacramento, California Stage and Theatre News wrote of her performance as Christine, "Bryant has that young, innocent look about her that makes her perfect for this role, as well as having one of the most lovely voices to ever grace a Sacramento stage." She played Carlotta in the third national tour of Phantom (2005–06; parts of 2008–2012). In 2006–07, Bryant covered the roles Majella and Queen Elizabeth I and performed as swing in The Pirate Queen on Broadway. In the summer of 2008, Bryant returned to the Broadway production of Phantom, covering Carlotta and performing that role several times. She returned to the roles of Christine, Carlotta and sometimes Madame Giry, on Broadway, for parts of 2009–12.

With the New York Gilbert and Sullivan Players in New York City, she has played roles since 1993, including Josephine in H.M.S. Pinafore (2001), Aline in The Sorcerer (2001; 2012), Phyllis in Iolanthe and Elsie in The Yeomen of the Guard (2003) and the Plaintiff in Trial by Jury (2011) at Symphony Space, and Josephine in Pinafore (2002–03), Mabel in The Pirates of Penzance (2003), Casilda in The Gondoliers (2003) and the title role in Princess Ida (2008) at New York City Center. New York magazine called Bryant's Josephine "Easy to hear and lovely to look at." The New York Times wrote that, in Princess Ida, she "brought a plush soprano voice and lovely presence to the title role."

She also appeared in the Encores! presentation of Bye Bye Birdie (2004). She played Stage Manager in Our Town (2000) and Betty in John Guare's Landscape of the Body (2004), both at Gloria Maddox Theatre, directed by Terry Schreiber. Bryant volunteers as a "green captain" for Broadway Green Alliance to help the New York theatre community to implement environmentally friendly practices. Bryant is set to appear in musical comedy "Waiting For You," performed in her home state of South Carolina between April 11 and April 13, 2025.

== Regional theatre and opera ==
With Portland Opera, Bryant performed as Frasquita in Carmen, singing Micaela for the previews. There she also sang Gretel in Hansel and Gretel, Antonia in Man of La Mancha, Pamina and Second Lady in An American Magic Flute, Adele in Die Fledermaus and Alice in Through the Opera Glass. She also sang Zerlina in Don Giovanni with The Boheme Opera of New Jersey (2005) and has appeared with Opera Longview (Texas, 2003) as Susanna in Le Nozze di Figaro, The National Opera Association as Polly in The Beggar's Opera, John Brownlee Opera Association as Bianca in The Taming of the Shrew. She has appeared in productions with the Brevard Music Center Opera, Aspen Opera, Greenville Symphony, Spartanburg Symphony, Piedmont Opera, Opera East Texas, and Opera Ontario. She sang the role of Mabel in Pirates for The Sacramento Music Circus (2004) and with a number of other companies.

Bryant's regional theatre roles have included Sally Talley in Talley's Folly (1999; Warehouse Theatre), Sharon in Master Class (2000; Warehouse Theatre), Marian in The Music Man (2000; Muhlenberg Summer Theatre), Maria in West Side Story (Rockwell Productions), Eliza in My Fair Lady (The Farmhouse, N.C.), Bette Davis and Jeanette MacDonald in There's No Place Like Hollywood (Stella Adler Theatre, L.A.), Laurey in Oklahoma! (Town N’ Country Theatre, S.C.), Maisie in The Boy Friend, Julie in Carousel (Greenville Little Theatre), and Hope in Anything Goes (Yorktown Regional Theatre). She also starred in Riverside Theatre's production of Showtune (2004) She is appearing as Mrs. Nordstrom in A Little Night Music at Indiana Repertory Theatre in January–February 2013.

== Cabaret, film, television and recordings ==
Bryant performs in her own one-woman show, My Life's Journey Through Song, tours frequently together with the Irish tenor Ciaran Sheehan in a concert called From Galway to Broadway and often performs with the concert group "Broadway Sings!" Her film and TV credits include The Manchurian Candidate (Teacher, 2003), 7th Heaven (Julia's Mom 2002), and Law & Order (Reporter, season one).

Bryant released a solo CD in 2008, called My Favorite Things, a collection of mostly musical theatre songs.
