= New York Gilbert and Sullivan Players =

Repertory theatre

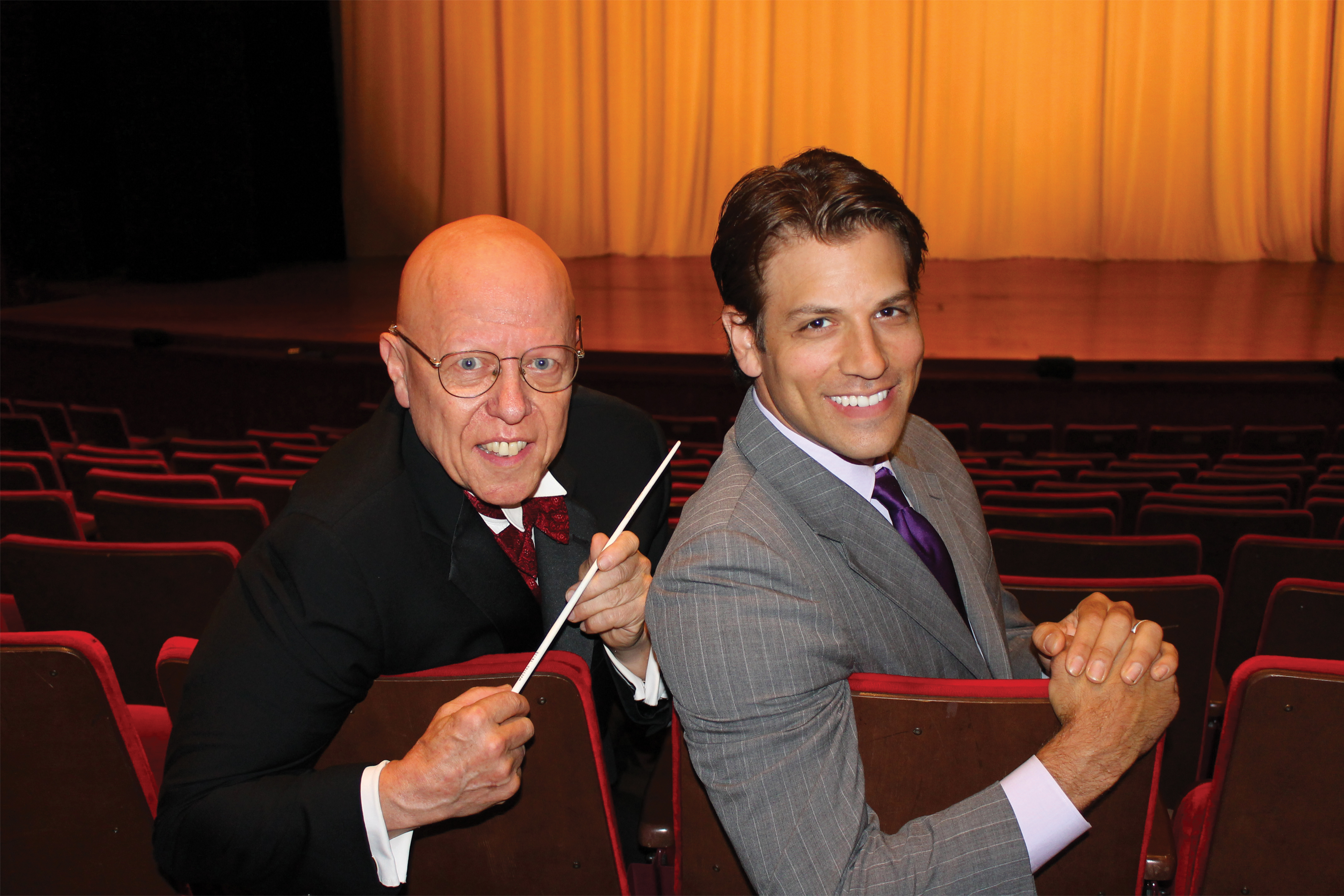
Albert Bergeret, Founding Artistic Director, and David Wannen, Executive Director, of NYGASP (2014)

New York Gilbert and Sullivan Players (NYGASP) is a professional repertory theatre company, based in New York City, that has specialized in the comic operas of Gilbert and Sullivan for more than 50 years. It performs an annual season in New York City and tours throughout the year in North America. Its founding artistic director is Albert Bergeret, who now has an emeritus role.

Beginning in New York City in 1974 by performing the Savoy operas with piano accompaniment, the company hired its first orchestra in 1979 for its seasons each year at Symphony Space theatre in Manhattan. The company was fully professional by the 1980s and began touring, presenting its full-scale productions at such venues as Wolf Trap in Virginia, as well as its New York seasons. In 2002, NYGASP first rented the 2,750-seat New York City Center, where it performed most of its annual New York seasons until 2013, after which it has used other Manhattan theatres, including Hunter College's Sylvia and Danny Kaye Playhouse. It has performed several times at the International Gilbert and Sullivan Festival. NYGASP also gives performances and workshops at schools and offers smaller touring groups and cabaret performances.

== History ==
=== Early years ===
Albert Bergeret founded the New York Gilbert and Sullivan Players in 1974, together with his wife, Gail Wofford (they married in 1978) and a few others. Bergeret, Wofford and most of the other founders were alumni of the Barnard Gilbert and Sullivan Society, a New York City college theatre group that presented the operas of Gilbert and Sullivan at Columbia University from 1948 to 1991.

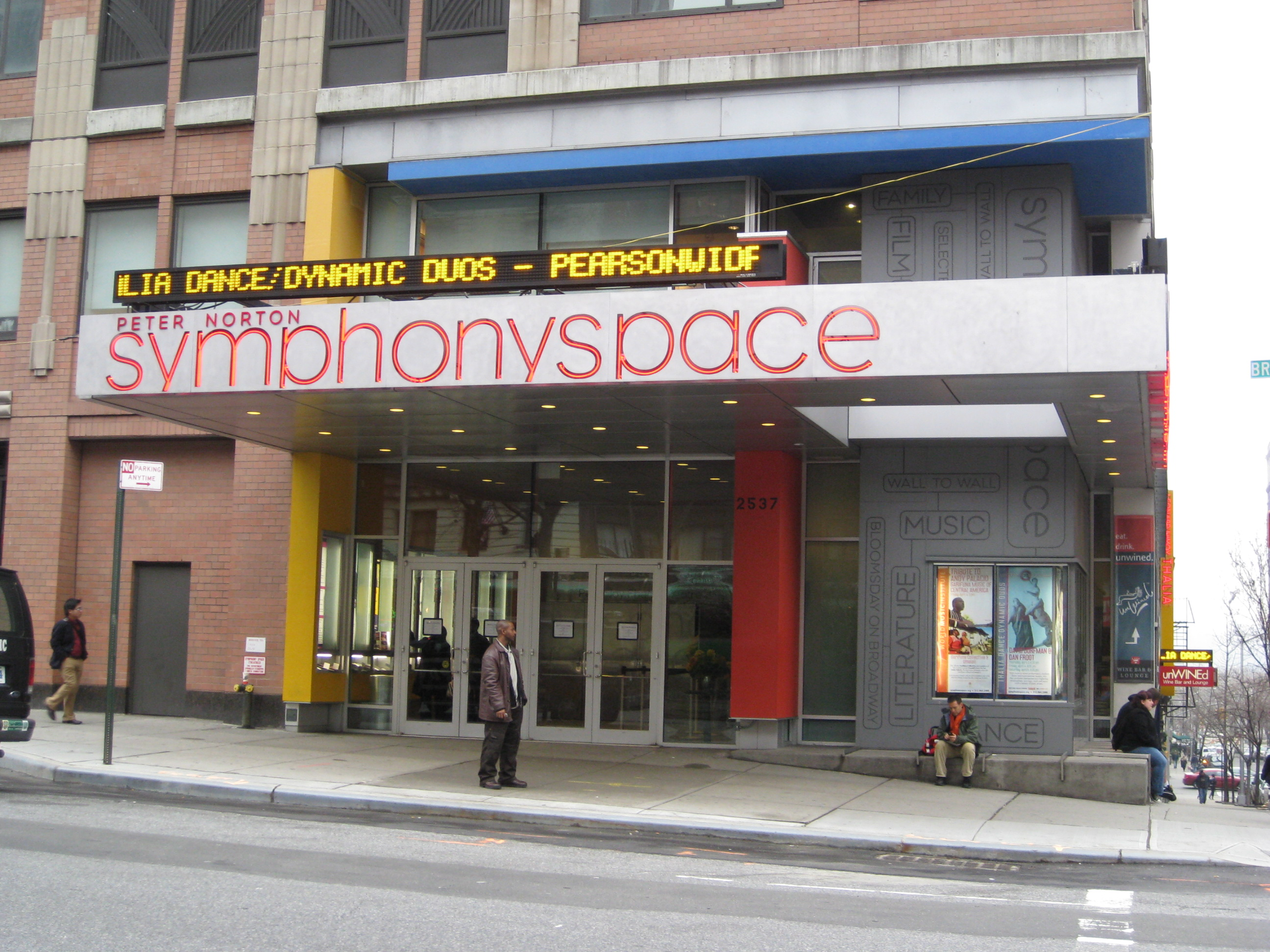
Symphony Space, the company's home from 1978 to 2001 and occasionally thereafter

The nascent group's first performance was in Straus Park, on the Upper West Side of Manhattan, on July 14, 1974, as part of a street fair. In the early years of the company, singers were drawn from Columbia University and from the semi-pro New York theatre community, including Vincent La Selva's opera workshop, and sang without compensation. Originally called "West Side Gilbert & Sullivan Players", the group originally performed scenes from Gilbert and Sullivan operas with a sound system and a cast of nine people in outdoor performances and in nursing homes and hospitals around New York City, with borrowed costumes, set pieces and an electric piano from the New York Grand Opera, the Bloomingdale School of Music and other supporters. Their first indoor home was at the theatre in the B’nai Jeshurun Community Center. Bergeret designed and built the sets and acted as stage and musical director. In 1975, the company incorporated as a not-for-profit organization under the current name.

At the beginning of 1976, the company began to offer runs in repertory on Sundays, the only day the theater was available, since the New York School of Opera used the space on other days. After several Sunday performances of H.M.S Pinafore and Trial by Jury, NYGASP expanded its repertoire by premiering a new production of The Pirates of Penzance on Sunday afternoon, February 29, 1976 – the 30th birthday of the character Frederic from that opera. Bergeret appeared on stage ahead of the performance, made up as the 120-year-old hero, and a large cake was cut and shared with the audience. WQXR Radio's manager, Robert Sherman assisted with the festivities. That autumn, the company had grown sufficiently to permit four shows – Pinafore, Pirates, The Mikado, and Iolanthe – to be presented in rotation. Beginning in the fall of 1977, the company was performing full weeks runs of the operas, and the following year it moved into the 700-seat Symphony Space theatre in New York, including a production celebrating the centenary of H.M.S. Pinafore. Bergeret traded his services as the first technical director of Symphony Space (and Wofford as house manager) in exchange for office space, storage and theatre dates.

Bergeret was ambitious, and he wanted his company to grow and become fully professional. In May 1979, NYGASP hired its first 25-piece orchestra and began to pay performance fees to principal singers as the level of professionalism of its cast continued to increase. NYGASP scored a publicity coup on October 28, 1979, when pictures of the cast performing excerpts from Pinafore on the Staten Island Ferry were displayed in the Sunday New York Times and the New York Daily News. The company expanded its audience further at Symphony Space as it celebrated the centennials of the G&S operas there, beginning with The Pirates of Penzance in 1979, eventually performing all of the extant Savoy operas. NYGASP attracted such loyal fans and supporters as writer Isaac Asimov and began to gain favorable and frequent reviews in The New York Times and the Daily News, among others.

=== The 1980s and 1990s ===
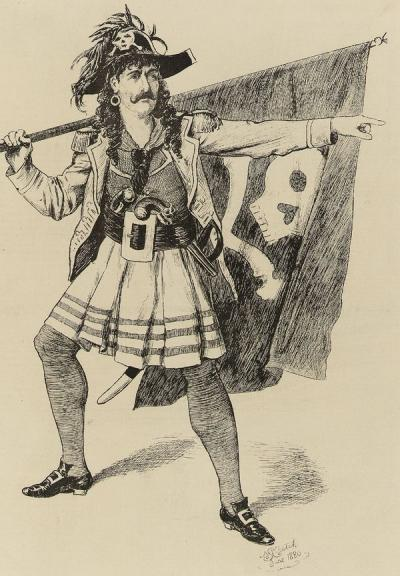
The company frequently performs The Pirates of Penzance

The 1981 season opened with NYGASP's celebration of the Patience centenary in April 1981 (hosted by Asimov). In the fall of 1981, NYGASP began touring its productions along the U.S. East Coast in addition to its short New York seasons. By the early 1980s, NYGASP paid performance fees not only to principal singers, but also to choristers. The company was able to attract an increased level of contributions, including annual grants from the New York State Council on the Arts. By the mid-1980s, NYGASP had attracted an independent Board of Directors to assist with fund raising and risk management.

NYGASP has imported various guest stars over the years to appeal to a larger audience. In 1984, NYGASP hired John Reed, the former principal comedian of the D'Oyly Carte Opera Company, to join NYGASP for a centennial production of Princess Ida at Symphony Space. He remained as the company's principal comedian for five more of its New York seasons. His presence also attracted additional professional singers to NYGASP for the chance to perform with him, and he was able to impart some of his experience to company regulars. At a gala benefit for the company at Symphony Space in 1987, Reed, dressed as the Lord Chancellor from Iolanthe, proposed marriage, on stage, to celebrity sex therapist and author Dr. Ruth Westheimer. Later guest stars came mostly from a television background. Some of those, like Steve Allen in 1995, were criticized for their lack of experience in the genre, while others, like Hal Linden in 2008, fared well.

NYGASP averaged four productions a year at Symphony Space during the 1980s and 1990s, each playing for about a week. In 1985, the orchestra was unionized, and in 1989 the company entered into an agreement with the Actors' Equity union. The company's repertoire expanded throughout the 1980s, and it gradually produced all of the extant Gilbert and Sullivan operas. There was also a short-lived attempt in 1989 to broaden the company's repertory beyond G&S, when it presented Gershwin's Pulitzer Prize-winning musical Of Thee I Sing. But the experiment proved too expensive for the company, and since then, NYGASP has stayed with G&S and a few presentations of Sullivan collaborations with other librettists. NYGASP recovered from a financially difficult 1990 with the help of supporter contributions and a willingness of its audiences to pay higher ticket prices, and the company survived (after one dark season), and continued to grow, through the 1990s, outliving the other professional light opera companies in New York City, notably the year-round Light Opera of Manhattan. In 1997 the company hired a professional touring management company.

=== 2000–2024 ===
In 2001, Symphony Space closed for renovations. NYGASP rented New York City Center, a 2,750-seat theatre in midtown Manhattan, for its 2002 season. In 2007, NYGASP presented, at City Center, a performance of The Rose of Persia, a comic opera by Sullivan and Basil Hood that had not been performed by a professional company for over seventy years. During a three-week run of Pirates, H.M.S. Pinafore, and The Mikado, the company enjoyed good box office results and continued to perform at City Center most seasons thereafter until 2013. Moving to this large house increased NYGASP's level of recognition and its annual budget to nearly 1.5 million dollars. Since 2014, the company has used other venues for its New York seasons.

The company celebrated its 40th anniversary in 2014 with a New York season at the Skirball Center for the Performing Arts in New York University and a return to the International Gilbert and Sullivan Festival in England. In 2015, the company withdrew a planned revival of The Mikado after a protest by Asian-Americans about stereotypical elements of their production reflected in the company's publicity materials. The company redesigned its production after consulting with an advisory group of Asian-American theatre professionals and journalists and debuted the new concept in December 2016, receiving a warm review in The New York Times. For that season and later New York seasons the company has played mostly at the Sylvia and Danny Kaye Playhouse at Hunter College. Of the company's production of The Yeomen of the Guard in 2018 there, Aaron Elstein wrote in Crain's New York Business, "the crowd ... exulted in delight." James Mills, one of the company's leading actors, was appointed its associate artistic director in the 2020s and began directing some productions. A 2012 review called the company's Pirates "a spectacularly entertaining show that channels decades of great theatrics, a little modern humor, and a perfectly picturesque staging."

NYGASP has used a number of different directors and conductors from time to time, but most of the productions were directed and conducted by Bergeret during this period. Until 2025, Bergeret served as NYGASP's artistic director and general manager, and Wofford continued to supervise the costumes and helped to run the company, along with other members of the NYGASP team, including executive director David Wannen (since 2006) and associate director and choreographer David Auxier (since 2008). In reviewing the company's Pinafore in 2008, The New York Times wrote, "From a staging perspective, there is nothing remotely subtle about Mr. Bergeret’s approach. Spoken dialogue is emphatically underlined with endless mugging and exaggerated gestures. ... Still, all hands treat the music with style and respect. Mr. Bergeret drew playing of bouncy refinement from the orchestra. The principals were uniformly good." In 2022, Bergeret received a Legend of Off Broadway award at the Off Broadway Alliance Awards, for "extraordinary contributions over many years".

== 2024–present ==
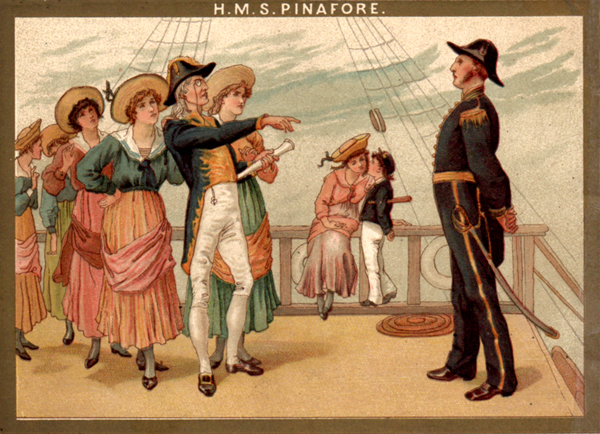
H.M.S. Pinafore is another mainstay of the company

In 2024–2025, the company celebrated its 50th anniversary with performances in New York of a jubilee concert and productions of Ruddigore, Pirates and Iolanthe. In 2025 Bergeret retired, stepping into an emeritus role, and Mills became artistic director, with Joseph Rubin as music director and managing director, both reporting to Wannen; as part of its season. The company's 2026 production, Utopia, Limited had not been produced professionally in New York City since 2010.

For their 21st century New York seasons, NYGASP has generally programmed about three G&S operas, one or two of which are drawn from the "Big Three" (Pinafore, Pirates or Mikado) and at least one of which is one of the less often seen Savoy operas. NYGASP continues to present broadly traditional productions of Gilbert and Sullivan, usually with a number of topical references added in. In their Pirates production, for instance, at one point the company performs a kick-line parody of A Chorus Line. But mostly they stay close to Gilbert's libretti. Notable singers who have performed with the company include Broadway soprano Kimilee Bryant and tenors Keith Jameson (ENO; NYCO) and Brandon Jovanovich (San Francisco Opera; NYCO), who have gone on to substantial opera careers. The Financial Times has praised the company's "roster of principals, mostly youthful, who treat the music with lilting grace, rhythmic bravado and patter virtuosity, as needed".

The company tours on the East Coast, in the Midwest and in other parts of the U.S. several times each year, performing regularly at Wolf Trap's Filene Center in Vienna, Virginia; Van Wezel Hall in Sarasota, Florida; the Mann Center outside Philadelphia; McCarter Theater in Princeton, New Jersey; the Shubert Theater in New Haven, Connecticut; and in Saratoga Springs, New York, among other venues, often earning positive reviews. The company has presented two G&S productions in England at the International Gilbert and Sullivan Festival and another two full-scale productions and its cabaret-style revue, "I've Got a Little Twist", at Gettysburg, Pennsylvania, as part of the U.S. leg of the 2010 International G&S Festival.

NYGASP usually presents a New Year's Eve gala and sometimes other special events, featuring pastiches or lesser-known Sullivan music or company members' favorite songs in concert, and there is sometimes a segment where spontaneous audience requests are played, with orchestra, and with singers chosen on the spot by the conductor. It also offers small groups of singers for concerts, private and corporate events and outdoor performances, under the name "Wand’ring Minstrels" and its cabaret-style revue combining Gilbert and Sullivan with musical theatre, I've Got a Little Twist, written and directed by David Auxier. The piece won a Backstage Bistro Award in 2010. In addition, NYGASP groups have often performed on the "listening room" program on WQXR radio in New York City and have been seen on The Today Show on Saturday morning on NBC.

== School and outreach programs ==
Each season, NYGASP offers a few full-scale performances of its main stage productions to NYC public school groups free of charge (paid for by corporate sponsors). It also presents its "Family Overtures" series of pre-show introductions for multi-generational audiences. In addition, Bergeret and small groups of performers from NYGASP travel to private schools in New York City to give concert-classes about the music and satire of Gilbert and Sullivan and other aspects of presenting G&S. The company also presents nearly full-scale or shortened versions of the shows at various schools throughout the school year, and sometimes invites school groups to see their shows for free or at reduced prices.

NYGASP has an arrangement with the school district in Syosset, New York, in which, each spring, a shortened version of one of a G&S opera is presented at a school, with piano accompaniment, using NYGASP principals, and giving an opportunity to 40-60 6th grade students to act as the chorus. The music teachers teach the students their vocal parts, and then Bergeret and a NYGASP accompanist teach the students the staging and choreography of the show and refine the choral music. The children rehearse for a full day with the NYGASP principals and have the opportunity to ask any questions that may occur to them. Two performances are given by the students at their school. In addition, introductory programs are given in advance to each of the 5th and 6th grade classes in the school district, to acquaint the students with some of the material and any special concepts they may need to understand (such as "apprenticeship" in The Pirates of Penzance or the British class structure in H.M.S. Pinafore). Sometimes the children also travel to New York City to see a full-scale NYGASP production.

== See also ==
- Light Opera of Manhattan
- American Savoyards
