= Shane Martin =

American state senator from South Carolina

Member of the South Carolina Senate from the 13th district
- Incumbent
- Assumed office 2009
- Preceded by: James H. Ritchie Jr.

Personal details
- Born: December 31, 1971 (age 54) Spartanburg, South Carolina
- Party: Republican
- Spouse: Amy M. (m. 1997)
- Children: 2
- Education: Clemson University (BS, 1994); Clemson University (MS, 1999)
- Profession: Engineer, businessman, politician

Shane Martin (born December 31, 1971) is an American politician serving as the member of the South Carolina Senate, where he has represented Spartanburg's 13th District since 2008. He is a member of the Republican Party.

== S.C. Senate ==
Martin has represented South Carolina's 13th Senate District since he defeated incumbent Republican James H. Ritchie Jr. in the Republican primaries in 2008. He chairs the Senate Corrections and Penology committee, and serves on the Senate Finance, Medical Affairs and Rules committees.

== Personal life ==
Martin has been married to his wife Amy since 1997. They have two children, Ashlyn and Aidan.

Martin is a native resident of Spartanburg County. He graduated in 1990 from Dorman High School. After high school, he attended Clemson University, where he received bachelor's and master's degrees in mechanical engineering. Before being elected as state senator, he was a school board trustee in Spartanburg District 6 (from 2005 to 2008). He is also a small business owner, and works as an engineer, specializing in Aerodynamic Testing and Program management for Chevrolet. He is a Baptist.

== Electoral history ==
Year	Office	Type	Party	Main opponent	Party	Votes for Talley				Result	Swing	Ref.
Year	Office	Type	Party	Main opponent	Party	Total	%	P.	±%	Result	Swing	Ref.
2008	S.C. Senate	Rep. primary	Republican	James H. Ritchie Jr. (Note: Incumbent seeking re-election.)	Republican	4,733	49.63%	1st	N/A	Runoff	N/A	
2008	S.C. Senate	Rep. primary runoff	Republican	James H. Ritchie Jr.	Republican	5,314	66.15%	1st	N/A	Won	N/A	
2008	S.C. Senate	General	Republican	Jimmy Tobias	Democratic	26,053	67.99%	1st	N/A	Won	Hold	
2012	S.C. Senate	General	Republican	Write-in	N/A	32,974	98.86%	1st	+30.87%	Won	Hold	
2016	S.C. Senate	General	Republican	Write-in	N/A	36,239	98.93%	1st	+0.07%	Won	Hold	
2020	S.C. Senate	General	Republican	Write-in	N/A	43,138	97.16%	1st	-1.77%	Won	Hold	

== Notes ==
South Carolina Senate
Preceded by James H. Ritchie Jr.	Member of the South Carolina Senate from the 13th district 2009–present	Incumbent
