= Kristie Greene =

- Born: Kristie Lynn Greene; July 24, 1970 (age 56); Anderson, South Carolina
- Education: Clemson University
- Beauty pageant titleholder
- Title: Miss Berea 1994; Miss South Carolina 1994
- Hair color: Brunette
- Eye color: Hazel
- Major competition: Miss America 1995

Kristie Lynn Greene (born July 24, 1970) is an American beauty pageant titleholder from Anderson, South Carolina who was named Miss South Carolina 1994.

== Biography ==
She competed at the Miss America 1995 competition, won by Miss Alabama, Heather Whitestone. Greene is a graduate of Clemson University with a degree in Secondary Education. Kristie has served as guest emcee for the Miss South Carolina pageant in Spartanburg, South Carolina. She has been a public educator for 25 years and resides in Murrells Inlet, SC. She has a daughter, Anna-Davis Lee.

Awards and achievements
| Preceded by Tonya Helms | Miss South Carolina; 1994 | Succeeded by Amanda Spivey |
