= Kristie Reeves =

Kristie Reeves (née Kerstin Weingartner) is a German actress, musical theater performer and producer. She started her performance career as a dancer in Germany at the age of seven. By the time she was a teenager she was touring Germany with her dance company JDC and after on made her switch to musical theater. Her first acting role was in the feature film September Song which premiered at the Munich Film Festival in 2001. She has danced with Jennifer Lopez and her choreographies have won her numerous awards.

== Career ==
=== Early years ===
Kristie started taking classes in classical ballet at the age of seven. Her dream was to become a classical dancer and she was working on it diligently, performing with her school and in her early teens joining the Junior Dance Company, a classical ballet company for talented teens, with which she was touring around Germany. After graduating high school she went to receive her diploma in classical ballet from the renowned Royal Academy of Dance in London. She was training with British ballet stars such as Julia Farron, David Wall, Alfreda Thoroughgood and Herida May. And it was Pamela May who coached her for her performance at the Royal Academy of Dance's Promotional Dance Day in Eindhoven, the Netherlands, led by the academy's president Antoinette Sibley. She was awarded a "Distinction" grade for her exams with the Royal Academy of Dance as well as "Highly Commended" from the Imperial Society of Teachers of Dancing.

Dance and choreography

After graduating from the Royal Academy of Dance, Kristie went back to dance with the JDC for another year. She also started training in Jazz, Modern, Tap Dance and Hip Hop which brought her performance opportunities with companies such as the Atomic DFT, Kairos Dance Company and at "5-6-7-8 Showtime" in Whistler, Canada. You could see her perform next to Jennifer Lopez in the music video "I am glad" (directed by David LaChapelle). She was the lead dancer and choreographer for "Downtown Drama Queen" by Liquid Film Productions and danced in Black Tie Dynasty's music video "Tender". Her lead performance in the short film The Dancer brought her to the attention of the press- the film earned an Honorable Mention Award in 2002 and won best Cinematography at the Oklahoma Film Festival. Other dance performances in film are: "Tango" (2003), "Dreamlovers" (2006) and "Yukka" (2009). Her choreographies have won awards at the Coquitlam Dance Festival, Dancepower and the Surrey Dance Festival. Other choreographies: "Lucia di Lammermoor" for Repertory Opera Company, "The Bartered Bride" for Celestial Opera Company, "Aida" for Casa Italiana, "The Rope" for ICAP Theater Company, "Don't try" for Rangeview Productions and "Love of a Nightingale" for Boston Court Theater. She also served as artistic director for "Once upon a Dance Company" in Los Angeles. Kristie could recently be seen at the "Arts meets Fashion" Show at Boulevard 3 in Hollywood and the "IMATS" Show in Pasadena for which both she choreographed and performed.

=== Musical theater ===
Kristie's first performance in musical theater was as a blonde Indian in Gateway's Theater production of Peter Pan (1997) followed by the role of Gemini Twin for Centennial Theater's production of A Funny Thing Happened on the Way to the Forum (1998) which brought her a Harris McLean Scholarship Award. She could be seen in the variety musical "The Roaring 20's" at Hendry Hall (1998), "Salute to Broadway" at the renowned Stanley Theater (1999), "A Night of Musicals" at the Arts Club Theater (1999) and most recently in the acclaimed Off-Broadway Production of "There's a Marquee" (2007). Kristie played "Miss Marmelstein" in I Can Get It for You Wholesale (2002), "Val" in A Chorus Line (2003), both at the renowned Theater of Arts in Hollywood, and "Helga" in Cabaret (2003- directed by Alice Carter).

=== Plays ===
Credits include: "Kathryn Howard" in "The Royal Gambit" (2001), "Rhonda" in "The Secret Rapture" (2001), both Theater of Arts, and "Purple Haze" in "Sunshine for a Midnight Weary" (2005) at the Inglewood Playhouse.

=== Filmography ===
Kristie's first film role came to her by surprise. Casting director Regine Tamba saw her in an acting class and introduced her to producer Georges Chamchoum who hired her for the role of "Roberta" in the film "September Song". The film was directed by Ulli Lommel and premiered at the Munich Film Festival in 2001 under its original name "Boots". The feature was followed by a role in the short film "Dignity" (2002). Kristie went on to television and could be seen in TV shows such as NBC's "Las Vegas" (2003), "The Division" (2004) for Lifetime Entertainment, and Warner Bros "Eyes" (2005). Kristie had a starring role in the feature film "Kissing Strangers" (2010) and is set to play "Ingrid" in the feature film "The Scottish Doctor" as well as "Chloe" in the feature "Group Therapy", both produced by Primitive Dog. Kristie earned her first official producer credit for the romantic comedy "Surviving in LA" (2010). She also wrote and played the lead role in the short film pilot "In the Meantime" (2010) which is set to go into a webseries production in the fall of 2011. Kristie completed the comedy short "Two Oranges And A Lemon" (2014) for Tuzla Film Festival directed by award-winning director Allison Beda.
