= Susan kae Grant =

American visual artist and educator

- Born: 1954 (age 70–71); Fort Atkinson, Wisconsin, US
- Education: University of Wisconsin-Madison
- Known for: Photographic series and installations, artist's books
- Notable work: Night Journey; Radioactive Substances
- Spouse: Richard Klein
- Website: Susan kae Grant

Susan kae Grant (born 1954) is an American artist and educator. Her work includes cinematic, staged photographic tableaux and portraits, as well as artist's books. Critics noted her early series for their use of vivid color and emotionally charged scenarios concerned with gender and sexual politics. Since the 2000s, she has focused on black-and-white imagery that uses shadow as a metaphor to explore perceptual aspects of dreams and memory. Grant's work is widely considered psychological, described by critic Michael Abatemarco as "an exploration into the familiar but fragmentary realm of the subconscious, where memories and thoughts appear to blend into strange, hybrid, and sometimes, nightmarish forms."

Grant's work belongs to the public collections of the Smithsonian Institution, Victoria & Albert Museum, Museum of Fine Arts, Houston, and George Eastman Museum, among others. She has exhibited at institutions including the Smithsonian, Center for Book Arts, Tokyo Metropolitan Museum of Photography, Center for Photography at Woodstock and Center for Creative Photography. Grant is based in Dallas, Texas.

== Early life and career ==
Grant was born in 1954 in Fort Atkinson, Wisconsin. She attended the University of Wisconsin-Madison, earning a BS in art and art education (1976) and an MFA in photography and book arts (1979). After graduating, she taught at Wayne State University in Detroit, before moving to Dallas to teach at Texas Woman's University (TWU) in 1981. She was a professor and head of photography and book arts at TWU until 2017 when she retired as Cornaro Professor of Visual Art, Emerita. Since 1989 she has taught workshops at the International Center of Photography, Anderson Ranch Arts Center and Los Angeles Center for Photography, among others.

Grant has had solo exhibitions at the Kansas City Art Institute (1989), Anchorage Museum (1997), Houston Center for Photography (2001), Conduit Gallery in Dallas (2002–20) and Grace Museum (2023), among other venues. In 2007, a thirty-year retrospective of her work was held at McKinney Avenue Contemporary in Dallas.

== Work and reception ==
Grant's work draws upon autobiographical sources such as journals, personal and scientific research, as well as influences from photography, film, painting, literature and music. Her images begin as pre-visualized ideas that are developed through a studio process which involves casting, the staging of models, and scene building with complex set-ups, props, backdrops and lighting. In formal terms, critics have noted the fabricated silhouetted imagery for its emphasis on light and dark, contrast, patterning, and a juxtaposition of forms that leaves interpretation open-ended. Her books are autobiographical works that often involve research and incorporate letterpress and digital technologies, handmade papers, photographic imagery, text and unconventional materials such as cowhide, lead, fur and vinyl.

=== Individual series and projects ===
In her early Autobiographical Dramas (1977–89), Grant translated journal material into abstract portrayals of ideas, feelings and humor centered on women's roles and sexual politics. Initially photographing herself (or models as stand-ins) in ambiguous situations in black-and-white, Grant shifted towards elaborate, vividly colored work that critics characterized as surreal and confrontational in its socio-sexual commentary.

Susan kae Grant, What’s Being Offered, archival pigment print, Night Journey project, 44” x 32", 2002.

With Vestiges (1992–94), a work addressing animal welfare, critics noted a shift in tone from restless and probing to calm and contemplative. The largely monochromatic, mixed-media project included silver-print images juxtaposing medical illustrations of human and animal hearts, an artist's book, sound, text and installations; the effects of its altar-like displays, cruciform clusters of text and imagery, mounds of dirt and votive-candle lighting were described as funereal and theatrical in quality.

Grant's touring, multi-chapter project Night Journey (2000– ), has included an immersive installation, individually and grouped images, video projection and sound. The series portrays a surreal, indistinct space in which silhouetted, incongruous forms (e.g., female figures, dolls, ballerinas, birdcages) seem to merge, partially vanish or melt into one another. The orchestrated interplay of shadow gestures and props on a screen was inspired by sleep laboratory research (conducted on Grant in collaboration with Dr. John Herman at the University of Texas Southwestern Medical Center), dream recordings and descriptions, memory and journal sketches. The images were first printed and displayed in mazes of sheer chiffon panels hung from ceilings, then as black-and-white iris prints; critics suggested they convey a sense of both uncanny mystery and hazy familiarity, like Plato's Allegory of the Cave—shadows standing for other realities. According to Lenscratch critic Aline Smithson, the series evokes "monochromatic dream states, psychological spaces that are at once childlike and a little bit sinister. [Grant's] use of light, shadow, and silhouette reflect a process that is well-considered and methodical."

Grant's Shadow Portraits (2004– ) trace back formally and thematically to Night Journey and to the popular silhouette portraits of the late 18th century, blending romanticism with a contemporary aesthetic. Her Collective Ruminations series (2020), completed during the COVID-19 pandemic, was a departure from high-contrast to highly patterned, white-on-white imagery juxtaposing location-shot trees with illustrations appropriated from historical dictionaries and encyclopedias. Borne out of personal experience (retirement from teaching, family deaths, meditation) and an interest in near-death experience (and its association with white light), these works metaphorically convey a sense of self-reflection, universality, vulnerability and beauty interrupted by intrusive thought according to critic Steve Carter.

Susan kae Grant, Radio-Active Substances, artist’s book, Lead, glass and polaroid emulsion transfers. 5" x 6" x 2", 1994–97.

=== Book art ===
Since 1976, Grant has published twelve handmade, limited-edition artist's books through her own imprint, Black Rose Press. Reviewers suggest they range in tone from playful (e.g., An Alphabet Book, 1979–81; the flip book trio The Wink The Kiss The Slap, 1997–88) to serious or unsettling (e.g., Portrait of an Artist and her Mother, 1978; Vestiges, 1992–4).

Among the latter works, Giving Fear a Proper Name: Detroit (1980–85) has been described as a poetic, fragmented representation of inner-city fear and alienation; bound in pink Cadillac car vinyl, its pages include collaged objects (bloody teeth, straight pins, slashed and pierced photographs) and text about various phobias. Radio-Active Substances (1994–7) is a memorial to the life of Marie Curie and examination of feminist issues, created for the Smithsonian exhibition "Science and the Artist's Book." Along with quotes and illustrations by Curie, it features a cover and pages made of lead sheeting and a box whose lid holds test tubes containing printed scrolls—materials that suggest themes of danger, illness, exploration and destruction. Washington Post critic William F. Powers called it an "eerie and provocative" work reminding viewers that "scientific knowledge is an exquisite and dangerous thing."

Grant was also the curator of the exhibition "Photographic Book Art in the United States" (1991–95), which was presented at seventeen venues across the US, including the Center For Creative Photography, Contemporary Arts Center (New Orleans) and Southeast Museum of Photography.

== Recognition ==
Grant's work belongs to the public collections of the Boston Athenaeum, Center for Creative Photography, George Eastman Museum, J. Paul Getty Museum, Minneapolis Institute of Art, Museum of Fine Arts, Houston, New York Public Library, Ringling Museum, Smithsonian Institution, Tokyo Photographic Museum, Victoria & Albert Museum, and Yale University Arts of the Book Collection, among others.

Grant has received the Worldwide Photography Gala Awards' Julia Margaret Cameron Award (2017), PhotoNOLA Review Prize (2014, third place; 2017, second place), Black & White Spider Award (2012) and inclusion on the 2014 Photolucida Critical Mass Top 50. She has received teaching awards from the National Society for Photographic Education and Texas Woman's University, among other institutions. In 2003, the Dallas Area Rapid Transit commissioned her to design its Parkland station; completed in 2010, her work included windscreens of shadow images and texts, station paving, color scheme and column design, and landscaping.
