= Columbia College (South Carolina) =

Private college in Columbia, South Carolina, U.S.

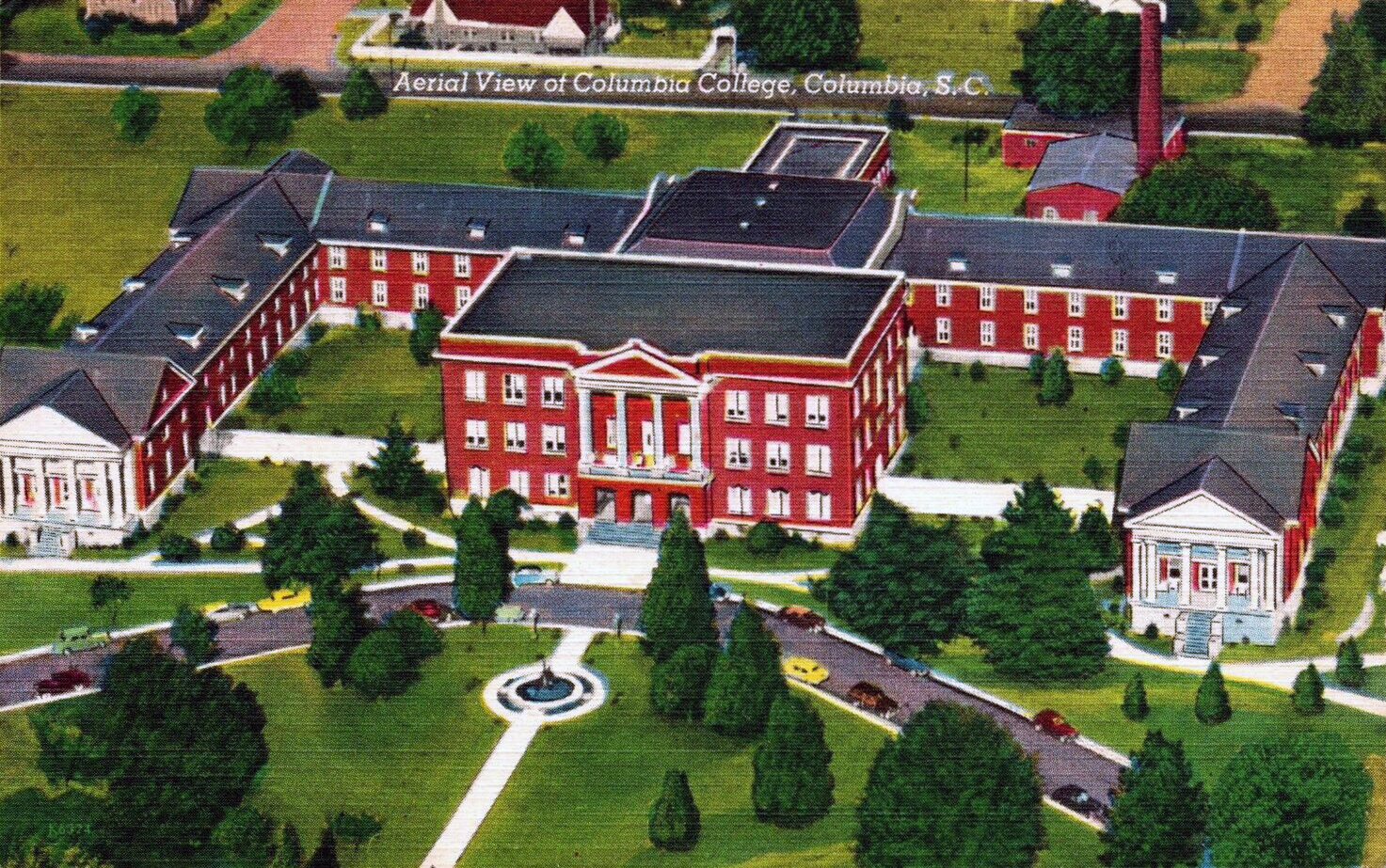
- Former name: Columbia Female College (1859–1905)
- Motto: Non quem sed quid
- Motto in English: Not who, but what
- Type: Private liberal arts college
- Established: 1854; 172 years ago
- Religious affiliation: United Methodist Church
- Endowment: $20 million (2024)
- President: John Dozier
- Provost: Gillian Stewart-Wells
- Faculty: 57 full-time 181 part-time
- Students: 1,514
- Location: Columbia, South Carolina, U.S. 34°02′42″N 81°01′53″W
- Colors: Purple
- Nickname: Koalas
- Sporting affiliations: NAIA – Appalachian
- Mascot: CeCe
- Website: www.columbiasc.edu

Columbia College is a private college in Columbia, South Carolina, United States. Founded in 1854 by the United Methodist Church as a women's liberal arts college, Columbia College became fully coeducational in 2020 welcoming its first coed residential class in fall 2021. It also offers evening, graduate, and online programs for women and men.

== History ==
Founded in 1854, Columbia Female College officially opened in 1859 with an initial student body of 121 and a faculty of 16. When General Sherman and his troops marched through Columbia in 1865, the school had to close. It was saved from being torched only because Professor of Music W. H. Orchard, having heard that all unoccupied buildings would be burned by a certain hour, left his home to stand in the doorway of the college where he could be seen by the troops. The school was reopened in 1873. The college was damaged by its first fire in 1895, though the damage was not extensive. The name changed to Columbia College in 1905 after it was moved to its present site in North Columbia in 1904. Swept by a second fire in 1909, the college operated out of its former Plain Street facilities until the North Columbia campus could be reoccupied in 1910.

From 1940 to 1951, presidents Guilds and Greene oversaw Columbia College as well as Wofford College in Spartanburg, South Carolina.

In 1964, a third fire ravaged the campus, destroying Old Main, a college landmark. Frightened and disheartened students, huddled in the middle of the night in College Place Methodist Church, were told by President Spears, "Nothing has been destroyed that cannot be rebuilt." Soon thereafter, new interest in the college was engendered, and building continued. The columns of Old Main, which had been the only thing left standing in the ashes when the fire was over, became a symbol of Columbia College, its strength and its endurance.

Georgia O'Keeffe taught art at Columbia College in 1915 and 1916. She used a room as her art studio to pursue her drawing.

During the 1980s, an evening college was established in which both female and male students could be educated. In 2026 "U.S. News & World Report" has ranked Columbia College No. 59 (tied) out of 135 regional colleges in the South. It was also ranked by U.S. News & World Report as No. 22 in Best Value Schools out of 51, No. 30 (tied) in Best Colleges for Veterans out of 39, and No. 17 (tied) in Top Performers on Social Mobility out of 132 regional colleges in the South. Additionally, Columbia College is ranked No. 56 (tied) among 348 institutions in the nation for Best Online Bachelor's Programs, marking one of the most notable advancements in its online academic portfolio to date.

In 2011, the Carnegie Foundation for the Advancement of Teaching and the Council for Advancement and Support of Education (CASE) named Columbia College professor Dr. John Zubizarreta "U.S. Professor of the Year" for undergraduate baccalaureate colleges. Zubizarreta was a professor of English and director of honors and faculty development for Columbia College. The Columbia College honors program has also produced two consecutive National Collegiate Honors Council Honor Students of the Year, Homa Hassan in 2009 and Diana Lynde in 2010.

On January 31, 2020, the board of trustees voted to admit men to the college's residential day program. This was a significant change for Columbia College, which was founded in 1854 as Columbia Female College. This was not the first time men studied at the college, as male students have previously participated in co-ed evening, graduate, and online programs, but this was the first time men could study in the co-ed residential day program. Columbia College stated it made the change to enroll men as a result of "shifts in student demographics, cultural shifts and population trends."

== Athletics ==
The Columbia College athletic teams are called the Koalas. The college is a member of the National Association of Intercollegiate Athletics (NAIA), primarily competing in the Appalachian Athletic Conference (AAC) since the 2011–12 academic year. The Koalas previously competed in the Southern States Athletic Conference (SSAC; formerly known as Georgia–Alabama–Carolina Conference (GACC) until after the 2003–04 school year) from 2005–06 to 2010–11; and in the defunct Eastern Intercollegiate Athletic Conference (EIAC) during the 2004–05 school year.

Columbia College competes in 18 intercollegiate varsity sports: Men's sports include basketball, cross country, golf, lacrosse, soccer, swimming, tennis and track & field; while women's sports include basketball, cheer, cross country, lacrosse, soccer, softball, swimming, tennis, track & field and volleyball. Men's sports debuted when the college became co-educational in 2020, beginning athletic competition in the 2021 fall season.

Alongside the addition of men's sports, Columbia College added Esports as a program within the institution. This includes Overwatch 2, Valorant, Rocket League, and Super Smash Bros Ultimate.

== Notable people ==
=== Alumnae ===
- Bettye Ackerman, actress
- Lori Allen, was a TV personality on "Say Yes to the Dress: Atlanta" and owner of Bridals by Lori
- Jenn Colella, comedian, actress, and singer
- Wil Lou Gray, innovator in alternative education
- Jane Herlong, is a humorist, author, speaker and the winner of Miss South Carolina 1979 pageant
- Rachel Hodges, former First Lady of South Carolina
- Alicia Leeke, artist
- Janice McNair, former owner of Houston Texans
- Carol Devine Miller, member of the West Virginia House of Delegates and the US House of Representatives
- Honorable Liz Patterson, second woman in the South Carolina Senate,and first woman elected to Congress from South Carolina in her own right.
- Christale Spain, Chair of the South Carolina Democratic Party
- Sarah Wendell, writer and blogger
- Karen J. Williams, made history as the first female judge on the U.S. Fourth Circuit Court of Appeals and the first female Chief Judge of that court in South Carolina.

=== Faculty ===
- Lucile Godbold, track and field athlete who won gold and bronze at the First International Games for Women, first woman inducted into SC Sports Hall of Fame, and annual touch football game named Ludy Bowl after her.
- Georgia O’Keeffe taught art at Columbia College in 1915 and 1916.
- Trudie Kibbe Reed, president of Philander Smith College and Bethune–Cookman University
