= James H. Ritchie Jr. =

American politician (born 1961)

Member of the South Carolina Senate from the 13th district
- In office 2000 -2008
- Preceded by: Charles Tyrone Courtney
- Succeeded by: Shane Martin

Personal details
- Born: August 12, 1961 (age 64) Morgantown, West Virginia
- Party: Republican
- Spouse: Evelyn
- Profession: Attorney

James H. Ritchie Jr. is a Republican member of the South Carolina Senate, representing the 13th District since 2000. He lost to Shane Martin in the June 10th, 2008 primary election, 33.85% to 66.15%.
