= Virginia Trotter =

American government official

Virginia Yapp Trotter

Assistant Secretary of Education
- In office 1974–1977
- President: Richard Nixon; Gerald Ford
- Preceded by: Sidney P. Marland Jr.
- Succeeded by: Mary Frances Berry

Personal details
- Born: Virginia Yapp; November 29, 1921 Boise, Idaho
- Died: October 11, 1998 (aged 76) Athens, Georgia
- Spouse: Robert Trotter
- Education: Kansas State University; Ohio State University

Virginia Yapp Trotter (November 29, 1921 – October 11, 1998) was Assistant Secretary of Education from 1974 to 1977, under Presidents Richard Nixon and Gerald Ford. The position was included in the Department of Health, Education and Welfare at the time. Trotter was the first woman to hold the U.S. government's highest education post, although the position did not become cabinet-level until 1979.

Trotter worked as a university administrator before and after serving as Assistant Secretary. As president of academic affairs at the University of Georgia, she intervened in 1981 to allow nine football players to pass a remedial English course, allowing them to play against Pittsburgh in the 1982 Sugar Bowl, which resulted in a scandal at the school.

== Early life and education ==
She was born Virginia Yapp on November 29, 1921, in Boise, Idaho, and was raised in Manhattan, Kansas, where her father Rockford Glenn Yapp worked as the State Entomologist for Kansas and a professor of entomology at Kansas State University. She graduated from Kansas State University in 1943, and then earned a master's degree from Kansas State in 1947. She earned a doctorate from Ohio State University in 1960.

She married Robert Trotter and had one child, Robert Trotter, Jr. Her husband was a Navy pilot who died in a plane crash off the island of Saipan after World War II. She never remarried.

== Professional career ==
Trotter began her administrative career at the University of Utah in 1948 as director of the university's home management laboratory. From 1950 to 1955 she served as head of the Home Economics and Management Division at the University of Nebraska–Lincoln. From 1955 to 1963 she worked as chairman of home economics at the University of Vermont.

Trotter returned to the University of Nebraska in 1963 and served as dean of the College of Home Economics at the school until 1972, and vice chancellor for academic affairs from 1972 to 1974. After serving as Assistant Secretary of Education from 1974 to 1977, she returned to academia as the first female vice president for academic affairs at the University of Georgia.

=== Georgia scandal ===
While serving as vice president of academic affairs at Georgia, Trotter was implicated in intervening in 1981 to alter grades for nine football players so that they would pass a remedial English course. After the players were allowed to play in the team's bowl game, University of Georgia teacher Jan Kemp brought the issue into the public with a protest letter on February 1, 1982. Kemp was relieved of duties, and then filed suit against the university, Trotter and another administrator. In 1986, Kemp won a $2.58 million judgment against the three defendants, including $1.5 million from Trotter for punitive damages. The total judgment was later reduced to $1.08 million.

As a result of the scandal, Trotter was removed from her position as vice president of academic affairs and reassigned. The University of Georgia also stopped admitting athletes who were "partial qualifiers" under the NCAA's admission requirements.
