= Miss South Carolina =

Beauty pageant competition

- Formation: 1923; 103 years ago
- Type: Beauty pageant
- Headquarters: Columbia
- Location: South Carolina
- Members: Miss America
- Official language: English
- Key people: Ashley Byrd; Chaz Ellis; Erin Gambrell
- Website: Official website

The Miss South Carolina competition is the pageant that selects the representative for the state of South Carolina in the Miss America pageant. The pageant was first held in Myrtle Beach and moved to Greenville starting in 1958 and remained in that city until the 1990s. Spartanburg hosted the pageant in a few different venues until new leadership took over the organization and moved the pageant to Columbia, SC in 2011. The pageant was televised since the 1960s until the 1998 pageant. Televising was resumed with the 2000 pageant through 2006. The pageant returned to television in 2014.

Two South Carolina women have become Miss America: Marian McKnight of Manning in 1957 and Kimberly Aiken of Columbia in 1994. Six more have been first runners-up at the national competition and another thirteen have placed in the Top Ten. The Miss South Carolina organization is the leading state pageant in the nation in scholarship money raised for young women- surpassing many much larger states.

Lindsay Jones of Charleston was crowned Miss South Carolina on June 20, 2026, at Township Auditorium in Columbia, South Carolina. She competed for the title of Miss America 2027 on September 6, 2026, at the Kravis Center for the Performing Arts in West Palm Beach, Florida.

== Gallery of past titleholders ==
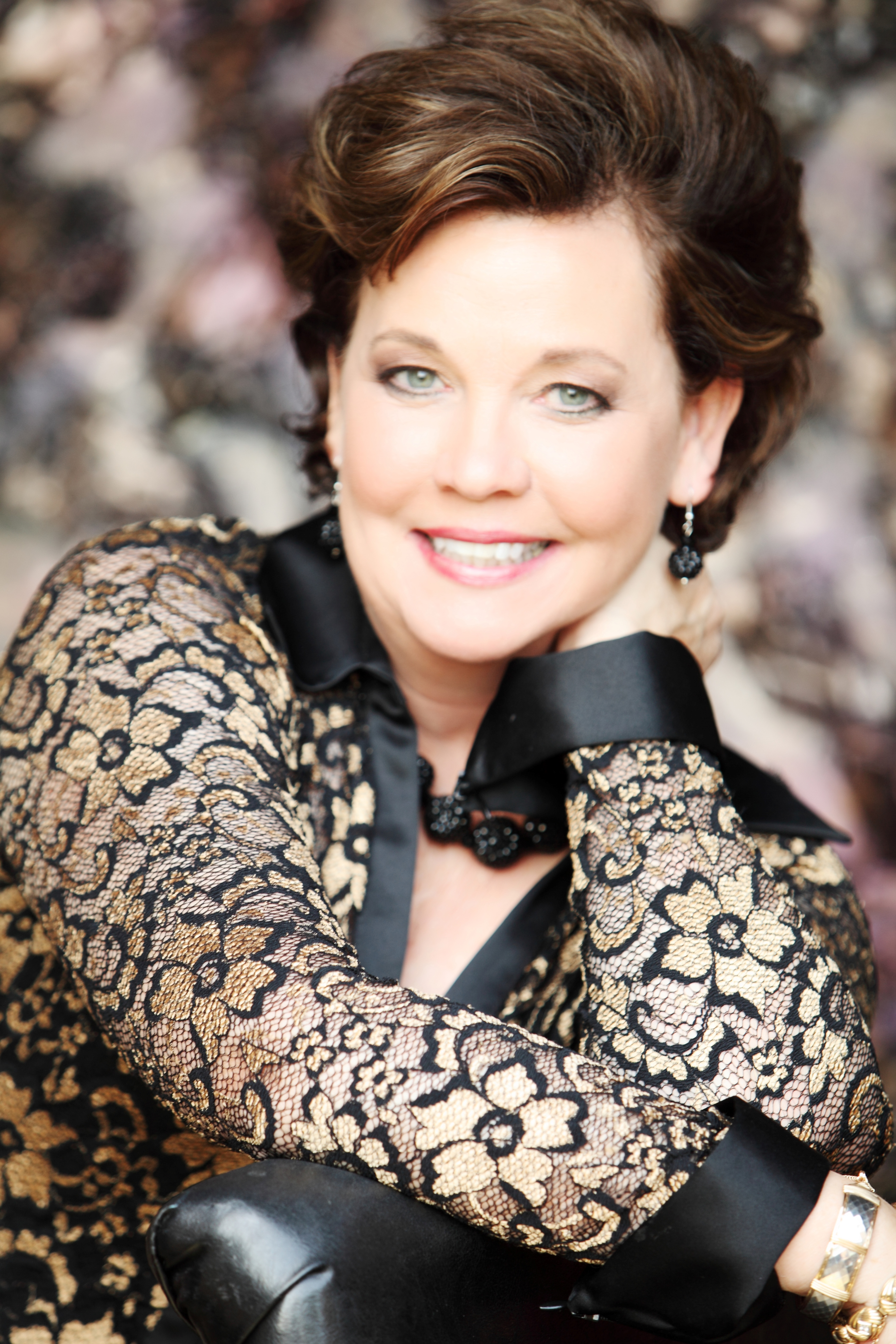
Jane Jenkins,
Miss South Carolina 1979

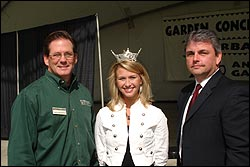
Shelley Benthall,
Miss South Carolina 2006

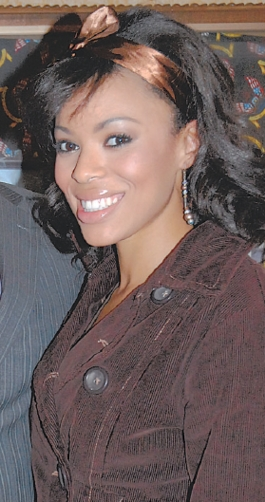
Crystal Garrett,
Miss South Carolina 2007

== Results summary ==
The following is a visual summary of the past results of Miss South Carolina titleholders at the national Miss America pageants/competitions. The year in parentheses indicates the year of the national competition during which a placement and/or award was garnered, not the year attached to the contestant's state title.

=== Placements ===
- Miss Americas: Marian McKnight (1957), Kimberly Clarice Aiken (1994)
- 1st runners-up: Claudia Turner (1971), Lavinia Cox (1977), Sherry Thrift (1986), Mary Gainey (1991), Ali Rogers (2013), Rachel Wyatt (2017)
- 2nd runners-up: Rankin Suber (1955), Catherine Hinson (1978), Dawn Smith (1987)
- 3rd runners-up: Evelyn Ellis (1963)
- 4th runners-up: N/A
- Top 7: Daja Dial (2016)
- Top 10: Joyce Perry (1952), Mary Griffin (1953), Miriam Stevenson (1954), Edith Sandra Browning (1961), Nancy Moore (1966), Cynthia Anthony (1976), Carrie Lee Davis (1993), Erika Grace Powell (2006), Suzi Roberts (2018)
- Top 11: Davis Wash (2025), Lindsay Jones (2027)
- Top 12: Bree Boyce (2012)
- Top 15: Mary Claudia Harvin (1927), LaBruce Sherill (1940), Kelly McCorkle (2003)
- Top 16: Crystal Garrett (2008)
- Top 20: Jeanna Raney (2002)

=== Awards ===
==== Preliminary awards ====
- Preliminary Lifestyle and Fitness: Rankin Suber (1955), Edith Sandra Browning (1961), Barbara Harris (1967), Claudia Turner (1971), Lavinia Cox (1977), Catherine Hinson (1978), Lisa Ann King (1984), Dawn Smith (1987), Nancy Humphries (1988), Carrie Lee Davis (1993), Ali Rogers (2013), Daja Dial (2016), Davis Wash (2025)
- Preliminary Talent: LaBruce Sherill (1940), Nancy Moore (1966), Lisa Ann King (1984), Valarie (Valerie) Trapp (1996), Kimilee Bryant (1990), Erika Grace Powell (2006)

==== Non-finalist awards ====
- Non-finalist Talent: Margaret Seible (1945), Gene Wilson (1959), Mary Diane Toole (1979), Julia Hill (1983), Amanda Spivey (1996), Janet Powers (1998), Heather Hudson (2001), Jessica Eddins (2004), Shelley Bryson Benthall (2007), Anna Perry (2009)

==== Other awards ====
- Miss Congeniality: Brooke Mosteller (2014) (tie)
- Active International Scholarship for Business and Marketing: Jeanna Raney (2002)
- Bernie Wayne Performing Arts Scholarship: Erika Grace Powell (2006)
- Children's Miracle Network (CMN) Miracle Maker Award: Brooke Mosteller (2014), Lanie Hudson (2015), Suzi Roberts (2018), Davia Bunch (2019), Morgan Nichols (2020)
- CMN Miracle Maker Award 1st runners-up: Rachel Wyatt (2017)
- George Cavalier Talent Award: Kimilee Bryant (1990)
- Quality of Life Award / Social Impact Initiative Scholarship 1st runners-up: Brooke Mosteller (2014), Morgan Nichols (2020), Sarah Kay Wrenn (2026)
- Quality of Life Award 2nd runners-up: Suzi Roberts (2018)
- STEM Scholarship Award Winners: Morgan Nichols (2020)
- Top Fundraiser: Julia Herrin (2022)
- AHA Go Red for Women Leadership Award Overall Winner: Sarah Kay Wrenn (2026)
- Quality of Life Award Finalist: Lindsay Jones (2027)

== Winners ==
- Declared as winner
- Ended as a runner-up
- Ended as a finalist or semi-finalist

| Year | Name | Hometown | Age | Local Title | Miss America Talent | Placement at Miss America | Special scholarships at Miss America | Notes |
|---|---|---|---|---|---|---|---|---|
| 2026 | Lindsay Jones | Charleston | 26 | Miss Charleston | HER Story | Top 11 | Quality of Life Award Finalist | |
| 2025 | Sarah Kay Wrenn | Columbia | 24 | Miss Lake Murray | Lyrical Dance | | Quality of Life 1st Runner-Up AHA Go Red for Women Leadership Award Overall Winner | Previously Top 10 at Miss South Carolina 2024 as Miss Greenville County, Top 10 at Miss South Carolina 2023 as Miss Capital City, and 3rd Runner-Up at Miss South Carolina 2022 as Miss Greenville County; also previously Top 10 at Miss South Carolina Teen 2017 as Miss Greater Easley Teen and Top 10 at Miss South Carolina Teen 2018 as Miss Spartanburg Teen |
| 2024 | Davis Wash | Edgefield | 23 | Miss Clemson | Vocal, "Ain't No Sunshine" | Top 11 | | Previously 1st Runner-Up at Miss South Carolina 2023 as Miss Greater Carolina |
| 2023 | Jada Samuel | Greenville | 26 | Miss Bridge City | HERstory | | | Previously 2nd Runner-Up at Miss South Carolina 2022 as Miss Columbia |
| 2022 | Jill Dudley | Myrtle Beach | 23 | Miss Hartsville | Vocal | | | |
| 2021 | Julia Herrin | Bluffton | 19 | Miss Clarendon | Piano | | Top Fundraiser 1st Place | |
| 2019–20 | Morgan Nichols | Lexington | 22 | Miss Clemson | Vocal, “Bridge Over Troubled Water" | | CMN Miracle Maker Award Social Impact Initiative Scholarship Award 1st runner-up STEM Scholarship Award | |
| 2018 | Davia Bunch | Spartanburg | 21 | Miss Spartanburg | Ballet en Pointe, "Feel it Still" by Portugal The Man | | CMN Miracle Maker Award | 4th runner-up at Miss South Carolina USA 2020 and 2022 competitions Later a contestant on season 27 of The Bachelor |
| 2017 | Suzi Roberts | Pawleys Island | 23 | Miss Columbia | Lyrical Dance, "Heaven Is a Place on Earth" by Katie Thompson | Top 10 | CMN Miracle Maker Award Quality of Life Award 2nd runner-up | Former NFL cheerleader for the Atlanta Falcons |
| 2016 | Rachel Wyatt | Piedmont | 21 | Miss Clemson | Dance, "Something in the Water" | 1st runner-up | CMN Miracle Maker Award 1st runner-up | Previously Miss South Carolina Teen 2012 and Miss America's Outstanding Teen 2013 Current NFL cheerleader for the Dallas Cowboys |
| 2015 | Daja Dial | Spartanburg | 22 | Miss Greenville County | Vocal, "I Believe" | Top 7 | Preliminary Swimsuit Award | |
| 2014 | Lanie Hudson | Spartanburg | 23 | Miss Anderson | Clogging, "Think" | | CMN Miracle Maker Award | Competed on America's Got Talent |
| 2013 | Brooke Mosteller | Mount Pleasant | 24 | Miss Mount Pleasant | Vocal, "Hallelujah" | | Miss Congeniality (tie) Quality of Life Award 1st runner-up CMN Miracle Maker Award | Winner of Miss Congeniality at both Miss South Carolina 2013 and Miss America 2014 pageants |
| 2012 | Ali Rogers | Laurens | 20 | Miss Laurens County | Piano, "I Want You Back" | 1st runner-up | Preliminary Swimsuit Award | Previously Miss South Carolina Teen 2009; Top 10 at Miss America's Outstanding Teen 2010 pageant |
| 2011 | Bree Boyce | Florence | 22 | Miss Capital City | Classical Vocal, "Tu Tu Piccolo Iddio" from Madama Butterfly | Top 12 | | |
| 2010 | Desiree Puglia | Simpsonville | 22 | Miss Pendleton | A Capella Tap Dance | | | |
| 2009 | Kelly Sloan | Gray Court | 24 | Miss Hartsville | Vocal, "For Once in My Life" | | | |
| 2008 | Anna Perry | Florence | 23 | Miss Lexington | Piano, "Rhapsody in Blue" | | Non-finalist Talent Award | Daughter of Miss South Carolina 1982, Julia Hill |
| 2007 | Crystal Garrett | Columbia | 21 | Miss Charleston | Vocal, "As If We Never Said Goodbye" from Sunset Boulevard | Top 16 | | |
| 2006 | Shelley Bryson Benthall | Florence | 21 | Miss Florence | Vocal, "A Broken Wing" | | Non-finalist Talent Award | Previously Miss South Carolina Teen 2003 First Miss South Carolina Teen to be crowned Miss South Carolina |
| 2005 | Erika Grace Powell | Easley | 20 | Miss Golden Corner | Classical Vocal, "Time to Say Goodbye" | Top 10 | Preliminary Talent Award Bernie Wayne Performing Arts Scholarship | Former nanny for Hugh Jackman's children Later Miss South Carolina USA 2012; Top 16 at Miss USA 2012 pageant |
| 2004 | Ann Ashley Wood | Spartanburg | 23 | Miss Charleston | Lyrical Dance, "You Raise Me Up" | | | Never received $25,000 in scholarship winnings from the Miss South Carolina Organization |
| 2003 | Jessica Eddins | Irmo | 24 | Miss North Charleston | Semi-classical Vocal, "And This Is My Beloved" | | Non-finalist Talent Award | |
| 2002 | Kelly McCorkle | Greenville | 23 | Miss Golden Corner | Lyrical Ballet, "I Believe" | Top 15 | | Contestant on The Amazing Race 7 with then boyfriend, Ron Young |
| 2001 | Jeanna Raney | Inman | 20 | Miss Greater Greer | Tap Dance, "Kiss Me" | Top 20 | Active International Scholarship for Business and Marketing | |
| 2000 | Heather Hudson | Lexington | 22 | Miss Tigertown | Classical Vocal, "Il Bacio" by Luigi Arditi | | Non-finalist Talent Award | Previously South Carolina's Junior Miss 1996 |
| 1999 | Danielle Davis | Greer | 18 | Miss Greater Greer | Vocal, "I Wanna Fall in Love" | | | |
| 1998 | Wendy Willis | Fountain Inn | 24 | Miss Camden | Vocal, "Operator" by The Manhattan Transfer | | | Previously Miss Clemson University in 1993-94. |
| 1997 | Janet Powers | Hartsville | 21 | Miss Southern 500 | Vocal Medley, "Go Tell It on the Mountain," "Gonna Build a Mountain," & "Ain't No Mountain High Enough" | | Non-finalist Talent Award | |
| 1996 | Angela Hughes | Anderson | 21 | Miss Anderson County | Tap Dance, "Sing, Sing, Sing" | | | Later Mrs. South Carolina America 2005 under her married name, Angela Hughes-Singleton |
| 1995 | Amanda Spivey | Boiling Springs | 22 | Miss Southern 500 | Soprano saxophone, "The Joy of Life" | | Non-finalist Talent Award | |
| 1994 | Kristie Greene | Greenville | 24 | Miss Berea | Comedy Vocal, "Exactly Like Me" | | | |
| 1993 | Tonya Helms | | 24 | Miss Greater Greer | | Did not compete; later assumed title after Aiken won Miss America 1994 | | |
| 1993 | Kimberly Clarice Aiken | Columbia | 18 | Miss Columbia | Vocal, "Summertime" | Winner | | First African American to be crowned Miss South Carolina Named one of People Magazine's "Fifty Most Beautiful People in the World" in 1994 |
| 1992 | Carrie Lee Davis | Greenville | 26 | Miss Greenville | Marimba, "Csárdás" | Top 10 | Preliminary Swimsuit Award | Postponed her medical school residency after being crowned Later sued the pageant and settled without terms being publicly disclosed |
| 1991 | Ronnetta Hatcher | Columbia | 26 | Miss Columbia | Percussion | | | Later Mrs. South Carolina 2015 under her married name, Ronnetta Hatcher Griffin |
| 1990 | Mary Gainey | Hartsville | 24 | Miss Liberty | Marimba, "Scherzo for Marimba in C" | 1st runner-up | | |
| 1989 | Kimilee Bryant | Greenville | 23 | Miss Berea | Classical Vocal, "Je Suis Titania" from Mignon | | Preliminary Talent Award George Cavalier Talent Award | Broadway actress and opera singer |
| 1988 | Anna Graham Reynolds | Greenwood | 23 | Miss Greenwood | Vocal, "Mack the Knife" | | | Daughter of Miss South Carolina 1957, Cecilia Colvert |
| 1987 | Nancy Humphries | Myrtle Beach | 21 | Miss Myrtle Beach | Piano, "The Stars and Stripes Forever" | | Preliminary Swimsuit Award | Former co-host of Access Hollywood Current co-anchor on Entertainment Tonight |
| 1986 | Dawn Smith | Columbia | 22 | Miss Liberty | Classical Vocal, "Je Veux Vivre" from Roméo et Juliette | 2nd runner-up | Preliminary Swimsuit Award | Dawn Smith's younger sister Shari was abducted and murdered by Larry Gene Bell a year prior to Dawn's crowning as Miss South Carolina. Events were later broadcast as television dramas. Won "Miss Pageant Rewind" on What Not to Wear against two fellow pageant contestants |
| 1985 | Sherry Thrift | Westminster | 23 | Miss Liberty | Clogging, "Are You From Dixie?" | 1st runner-up | | Previously South Carolina's Junior Miss 1980 |
| 1984 | Vicki Harrell | Columbia | 22 | Miss University of South Carolina | Piano | | | |
| 1983 | Dalia Garcia | Columbia | 21 | Miss South Congaree | Vocal, "Don't Cry for Me Argentina" | | | |
| 1982 | Julia Hill | Florence | 26 | Miss Duncan-Lyman-Wellford | Classical Piano, "Rachmaninoff's Piano Concerto No. 2, 3rd Movement" | | Non-finalist Talent Award | Mother of Miss South Carolina 2008, Anna Perry |
| 1981 | Jill Rankin | Columbia | 21 | Miss Columbia Northeast | Figure Skating, "Mozart's Piano Concerto No. 21 in C Major" | | | |
| 1980 | Donna Jewell | Columbia | 19 | Miss Cayce-West Columbia | Vocal, "Have I Stayed Too Long at the Fair?" | | | |
| 1979 | Jane Jenkins | Johns Island | 23 | Miss Charleston | Vocal Medley, "The Party's Over" & "Send in the Clowns" | | | Author of Bare Feet to High Heels, What Ta Tas Teach Us, and "Bury Me with My Pearls" |
| 1978 | Mary Diane Toole | Aiken | 17 | Miss Aiken County | Ballet, "Pas de Quatre" | | Non-finalist Talent Award | |
| 1977 | Catherine Hinson | Rock Hill | 22 | Miss Rock Hill | Saxophone Medley, "What Are You Doing the Rest of Your Life?" & "Flight '76" by Walter Murphy | 2nd runner-up | Preliminary Swimsuit Award | |
| 1976 | Lavinia Cox | Latta | 23 | Miss Rock Hill | Piano Medley, "The Man I Love" & "Sunny" | 1st runner-up | Preliminary Swimsuit Award | |
| 1975 | Cynthia Anthony | West Columbia | 22 | Miss Lexington | Classical Vocal, "Chacun le Sait" from La fille du régiment | Top 10 | | |
| 1974 | Cheryl Von Lehe | Charleston | 18 | Miss Charleston | Vocal, "Oh Babe, What Would You Say?" | | | |
| 1973 | Fran Riggins | Easley | 21 | Miss Easley | Vocal, "All the Things You Are" | | | |
| 1972 | Bonnie Corder | Columbia | 21 | Miss Columbia | Vocal Medley, "My Man's Gone Now," "Let Me Sing," & "I'm Happy" | | | |
| 1971 | Pamela Inabinet | Swansea | 21 | Miss Columbia | Tap Dance, "Puttin' on the Ritz" | | | Featured performer on the Miss America 1973 telecast |
| 1970 | Claudia Carmen Turner | Spartanburg | 19 | Miss Spartanburg | Vocal, "Once Upon a Time" | 1st runner-up | Preliminary Swimsuit Award | Claudia Carmen Turner Wells Bauman, died at 70 on September 24, 2021, in South Carolina. |
| 1969 | Brantlee Price | Newberry | 19 | Miss Newberry | Vocal, "Got A Lot O' Living To Do" | | | |
| 1968 | Rebecca Smith | Clover | 19 | Miss Clover | Semi-classical Vocal, "America the Beautiful" | | | |
| 1967 | Peggy White | Fountain Inn | 23 | Miss Laurens | Organ Medley, "Spanish Flea" & "Flight of the Bumblebee" | | | |
| 1966 | Barbara Harris | Simpsonville | 21 | Miss Columbia | Classical Vocal, "Adele's Laughing Song" from Die Fledermaus | | Preliminary Swimsuit Award | Toured with Miss America USO Troupe Former Mayor of Morris Township, New Jersey |
| 1965 | Nancy Moore | Aiken | 18 | Miss Aiken | Piano, "Variations on There She Is" | Top 10 | Preliminary Talent Award | Later married US Senator, Strom Thurmond, who was 44 years her senior, in 1968 |
| 1964 | Sue Smith | Florence | 20 | Miss Florence | Vocal Medley | | | |
| 1963 | Carolyn Gaines | North Augusta | 19 | Miss North Augusta | Popular Vocal | | | |
| 1962 | Evelyn Ellis | Greenville | 19 | Miss Columbia | Interpretive Dance, "Thank Heaven for Little Girls" & "Gigi" | 3rd runner-up | | Previously South Carolina's Junior Miss 1961 |
| 1961 | Janet McGee | Greenville | 20 | Miss Greenville | Vocal, "Ave Maria" | | | |
| 1960 | Edith Sandra Browning | Greenwood | 19 | Miss Greenwood | Comic Dance / Pantomime, "I Wish I Could Shimmy Like my Sister Kate" | Top 10 | Preliminary Swimsuit Award | |
| 1959 | Nettie Dennis | Moncks Corner | 19 | Miss Moncks Corner | Vocal | | | |
| 1958 | Gene Wilson | Charleston | 18 | Miss Charleston | Vocal, "If I Loved You" | | Non-finalist Talent award | |
| 1957 | Cecelia Ann Colvert | Greenwood | 19 | Miss Columbia | Pantomime / Vocal, "C'est si bon" by Eartha Kitt | | | Mother of Miss South Carolina 1988, Anna Graham Reynolds |
| 1956 | Marian McKnight | Manning | 19 | Miss Manning | Comedy Sketch, "The Monroe Doctrine" | Winner | | |
| 1955 | Martha Chestnut | Conway | | Miss Conway | Piano | | | |
| 1954 | Polly Rankin Suber | Whitmire | 19 | Miss Whitmire | Monologue, "Air Corps" | 2nd runner-up | Preliminary Swimsuit Award | |
| 1953 | Miriam Stevenson | Winnsboro | 20 | Miss Greenwood | Tap Dance | Top 10 | | Later Miss South Carolina USA 1954, Miss USA 1954, and Miss Universe 1954 First Miss USA to be crowned Miss Universe |
| 1952 | Mary Griffin | Florence | | Miss Florence | Classical Vocal | Top 10 | | 1st runner-up at the Miss USA 1953 pageant, representing Myrtle Beach 5th runner-up at Miss World 1953 pageant, representing the United States |
| 1951 | Joyce Perry | Conway | | Miss Conway | Comedy Vocal, "Sewing Machine" | Top 10 | | |
| 1950 | Carolyn Fowler | Lyman | 17 | Miss Lyman | Vocal, "Why Don't You Fall In Love With Me" | | | |
| 1949 | Barrie Wingard | Columbia | | Miss Clinton | | | | Died on April 24, 1952, after her car was struck by a drunk driver |
| 1948 | Esther Greene | Greenville | | Miss Greenville | | | | |
| 1947 | Margaret Griffin | Spartanburg | | Miss Spartanburg | Classical Vocal | | | |
| 1946 | Anne Mae Morse | | | Miss Columbia | | | | |
| 1945 | Margaret "Lou-Seible" Neeley | Columbia | | Miss Columbia | Drama, "Life with a Southern Mammy on an Old Plantation" | | Non-finalist Talent Award | |
| 1944 | Gloria Mae Grisso | Columbia | | Miss Columbia | | | | Multiple South Carolina representatives Contestants competed under local title at Miss America pageant |
| 1944 | Virginia Owens | Columbia | | Miss South Carolina | | | | Multiple South Carolina representatives Contestants competed under local title at Miss America pageant |
| 1943 | Sarah Nina Harvin | Columbia | | Miss Columbia | | | | Multiple South Carolina representatives Contestants competed under local title at Miss America pageant |
| 1943 | Jenelle Virginia Strange | Columbia | | Miss South Carolina | | | | Multiple South Carolina representatives Contestants competed under local title at Miss America pageant |
| 1942 | Virginia Pulliam | Columbia | | Miss Columbia | | | | Multiple South Carolina representatives Contestants competed under local title at Miss America pageant |
| 1942 | Nelle Xermenia Owens | | | Miss South Carolina | Dance | | | Multiple South Carolina representatives Contestants competed under local title at Miss America pageant |
| 1941 | Miriam King | Charleston | | Miss Charleston | | | | Multiple South Carolina representatives Contestants competed under local title at Miss America pageant |
| 1941 | Gloria Frances Missel | | | Miss South Carolina | Vocal, "My Heart Belongs to Daddy" | | | Multiple South Carolina representatives Contestants competed under local title at Miss America pageant |
| 1940 | LaBruce Sherill | Myrtle Beach | | Miss Myrtle Beach | Tap Dance, "Cocktails for Two" | Top 15 | Preliminary Talent Award | Multiple South Carolina representatives Contestants competed under local title at Miss America pageant |
| 1940 | Vanadora Baker | Dillon | | Miss South Carolina | Recitation | | | Multiple South Carolina representatives Contestants competed under local title at Miss America pageant |
| 1939 | Mary Eleanor Parish | Myrtle Beach | | Miss Myrtle Beach | | | | Multiple South Carolina representatives Contestants competed under local title at Miss America pageant |
| 1939 | Margaret Allan Shealy | Clinton | | Miss South Carolina | Vocal, "Especially For You" | | | Multiple South Carolina representatives Contestants competed under local title at Miss America pageant |
| 1938 | Margaret Simrill Land | Chester | | Miss Camden | | | | |
| 1937 | Wayring Smathers | Columbia | | Miss Columbia | | | | |
| 1936 | No South Carolina representative at Miss America pageant | | | | | | | |
| 1935 | No South Carolina representative at Miss America pageant | | | | | | | |
| 1934 | No national pageant was held | | | | | | | |
| 1933 | No South Carolina representative at Miss America pageant | | | | | | | |
| 1932 | No national pageants were held | | | | | | | |
| 1931 | No national pageants were held | | | | | | | |
| 1930 | No national pageants were held | | | | | | | |
| 1929 | No national pageants were held | | | | | | | |
| 1928 | No national pageants were held | | | | | | | |
| 1927 | Mary Claudia Harvin | Charleston | | Miss Charleston | | Top 15 | | No Miss South Carolina Contestants competed under local title at Miss America pageant |
| 1926 | Dorothy Brickman | Charleston | | Miss Charleston | | | | No Miss South Carolina Contestants competed under local title at Miss America pageant |
| 1925 | No South Carolina representative at Miss America pageant | | | | | | | |
| 1924 | No South Carolina representative at Miss America pageant | | | | | | | |
| 1923 | No South Carolina representative at Miss America pageant | | | | | | | |
| 1922 | No South Carolina representative at Miss America pageant | | | | | | | |
| 1921 | No South Carolina representative at Miss America pageant | | | | | | | |
