= Bree Boyce =

American model (born 1989)

- Born: Andrea Boyce; March 25, 1989 (age 37); Florence, South Carolina
- Education: Francis Marion University
- Height: 5 ft 7 in (1.70 m)
- Beauty pageant titleholder
- Title: Miss South Carolina 2011; Miss Capital City 2011
- Hair color: Brunette
- Eye color: Blue
- Major competition: Miss America 2012 (Top 13)

Andrea "Bree" Boyce (born March 25, 1989) is an American beauty pageant titleholder from Florence, South Carolina who was named Miss South Carolina 2011.

== Biography ==
From first to seventh grade, Boyce attended The Kings Academy in Florence, South Carolina. She later transferred to public school. She won the title of Miss South Carolina on July 2, 2011, when she received her crown from outgoing titleholder Desiree Puglia. Boyce's platform is "Eating Healthy and Fighting Obesity." At age 17, Boyce weighed 234 lb (106 kg). Her doctor diagnosed her excessive weight as the source of her knee problems, and warned that she would have more health problems in the future unless she lost weight. Through healthy eating and exercise, Boyce lost 112 lb (51 kg). over a period of three years, and began competing in beauty pageants. After winning the title of Miss South Carolina, Boyce became the focus of extensive media attention, and was featured on The Today Show, Good Morning America, The View, and Inside Edition.

Boyce attended Francis Marion University and was selected for membership in Omicron Delta Kappa in 2015.

Awards and achievements
| Preceded by Desiree Puglia | Miss South Carolina; 2011 | Succeeded by Ali Rogers |
