= Ali Rogers =

American model

Ali Rogers Fauntleroy
- Born: Almeda Adair Rogers; October 29, 1991 (age 34); Laurens, South Carolina
- Education: Clemson University
- Spouse: Wills Fauntleroy
- Children: 4
- Beauty pageant titleholder
- Title: Miss Laurens County Teen 2009; Miss South Carolina Outstanding Teen 2009; Miss Laurens County 2012; Miss South Carolina 2012
- Hair color: Blonde
- Eye color: Brown
- Major competitions: Miss America's Outstanding Teen 2010 (top 10); Miss America 2013 (first runner-up)

Ali Rogers Fauntleroy (born October 29, 1991) is an American beauty pageant titleholder from Laurens, South Carolina who was named Miss South Carolina 2012.

== Biography ==
She won the title of Miss South Carolina on July 14, 2012, when she received her crown from outgoing titleholder Bree Boyce. Rogers was swimsuit preliminary winner at Miss South Carolina 2012. Rogers' platform is “Making a Difference for Children with Disabilities” and she said she hoped to raise awareness for children with developmental disabilities during her reign as Miss South Carolina. Her competition talent was an original piano composition. Rogers majored in Communication Studies and is a member of Alpha Delta Pi at Clemson University. At the age of 17, Rogers won the title of Miss South Carolina Teen 2009, and went on to compete in the Miss America's Outstanding Teen 2010 pageant, placing in the top 10.

Awards and achievements
Preceded by Bree Boyce	Miss South Carolina; 2012	Succeeded by Brooke Mosteller
Preceded by Courtney Cisson	Miss South Carolina Teen; 2009	Succeeded by Caroline Blanton
