= Columbia Township Auditorium =

- U.S. National Register of Historic Places
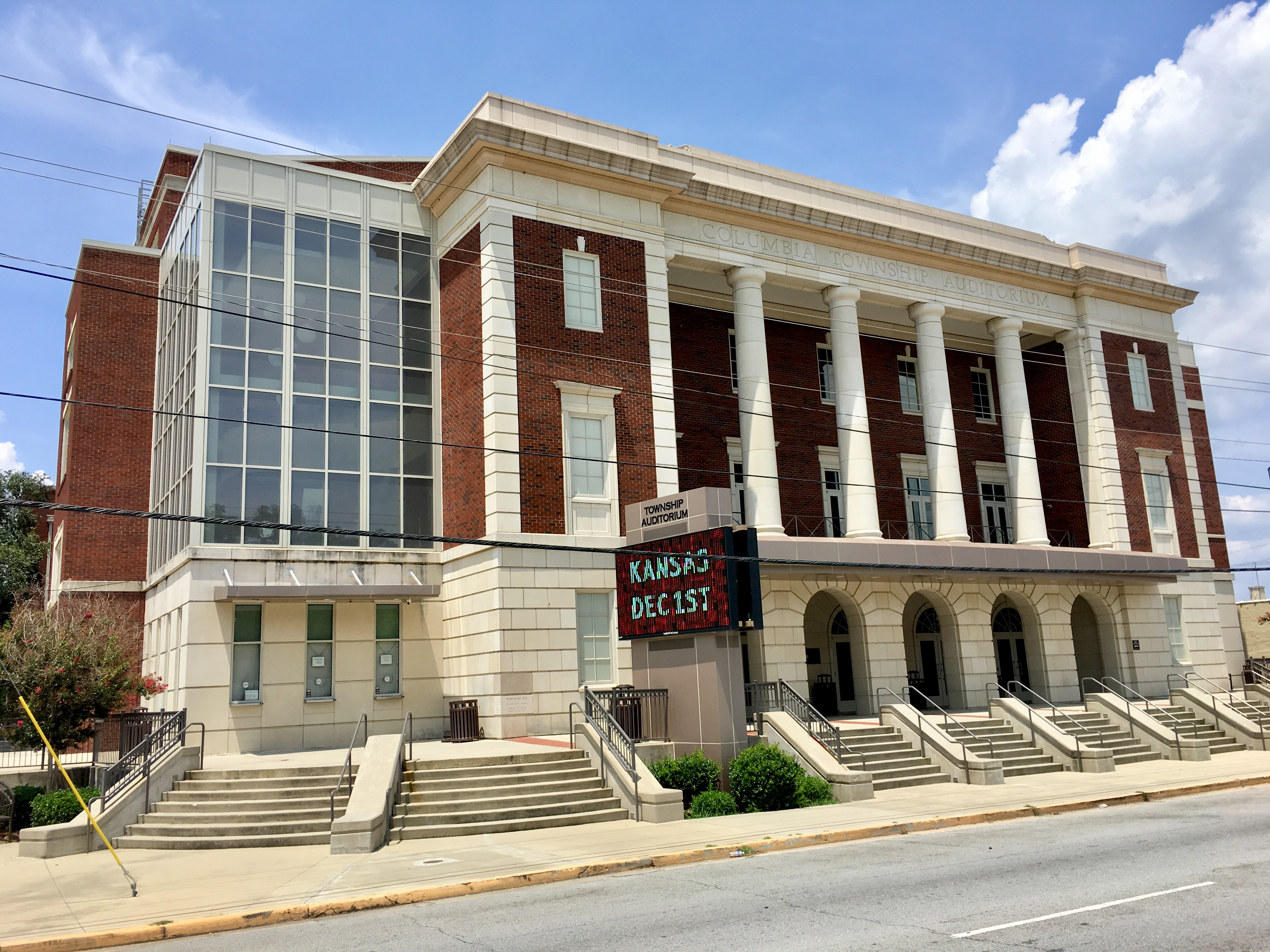

- Location within South Carolina Location within the United States
- Location: 1703 Taylor St. Columbia, South Carolina
- Coordinates: 34°00′35″N 81°01′40″W
- Area: less than one acre
- Built: 1930
- Architect: Lafaye and Lafaye; John C. Heslep
- Architectural style: Georgian Revival
- MPS: Segregation in Columbia, South Carolina MPS
- NRHP reference No.: 05001104
- Added to NRHP: September 28, 2005

Columbia Township Auditorium, also known as Township Auditorium, is a historic auditorium located in Columbia, South Carolina. It was built in 1930 (96 years ago), and is a three-story, brick building with a Doric order columned portico in the Georgian Revival style. It was added to the National Register of Historic Places in 2005, and in 2009 it underwent a complete renovation/modernization that saw the architects/facility win national awards for historic preservation/renovation. The auditorium has a seating capacity of 3,072 for standard concert seating and 3,383 with general admission floor seating.

In the early years of the building the facility was a major tour stop in the Southeast US with everyone performing there, including Count Basie & His Orchestra in 1939, Louis Armstrong in 1940 (for $1.20 a ticket) and 1944, Ella Fitzgerald in 1941, Duke Ellington in 1951 with Nat King Cole and Sarah Vaughan, Elvis Presley in 1956, Bill Haley & His Comets with Bo Diddley in 1956, Chuck Berry in 1956, Florida's Ray Charles in 1960, The Isley Brothers in 1960, Johnny Cash in 1963, Peter, Paul, & Mary in 1963, The Supremes in 1963, Augusta's James Brown in 1965, Macon's Otis Redding (died 1967) with Atlanta's Gladys Knight in 1965, Beach Boys in 1965, Greenwood's frat rock Swingin' Medallions in 1966, Paul Revere & The Raiders in 1967, Joan Baez in 1968, and Loretta Lynn, just to name a few. Through the 1970s and 1980s the building was a major part of the success and growth of professional wrestling in the US. Pink Floyd played there in 1972, Bruce Springsteen played there in 1978, The Jacksons performed there in 1979, Bob Seger played there in 1984, Blue Öyster Cult in 1979, The Clash in 1984, Athens' R.E.M. in 1986, the Beastie Boys in 1987, Red Hot Chili Peppers in 1989, Blues Traveler played there in 1992 and 1997, The Smashing Pumpkins (3 times: in 1994, 2000, and 2007), Phish in 1994 (Trey Anastasio has returned twice with his solo band in 2001. and 2005

Pink Floyd 1972 tour: Dark Side of the Moon Tour Springsteen 1978 tour: Darkness Tour The Jacksons 1979 tour: Destiny World Tour Rise Against 2012 tour: Endgame Tour

The facility is owned and operated by Richland County, with currently Aundrai Holloman serving as Executive Director and Andrew Horne serving as the Assistant Executive Director. Staff also includes Bo Abernethy Box Office Manager, Tresha Clark Marketing Manager, Julian Fajardo Event Manager and Melanie Sims as Business Manager.
