= Russ Anderson =

American ice hockey player (born 1955)

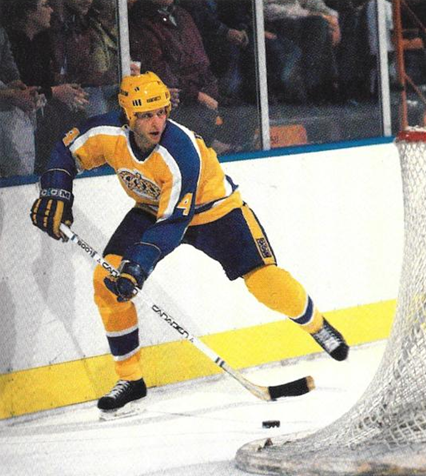
- Born: February 12, 1955 (age 71) Minneapolis, Minnesota, U.S.
- Height: 6 ft 3 in (191 cm)
- Weight: 210 lb (95 kg; 15 st 0 lb)
- Position: Defense
- Shot: Left
- Played for: Pittsburgh Penguins; Hartford Whalers; Los Angeles Kings
- National team: United States
- NHL draft: 31st overall, 1975; Pittsburgh Penguins
- WHA draft: 22nd overall, 1975; Winnipeg Jets
- Playing career: 1976–1985

Russell Vincent Anderson (born February 12, 1955) is an American former professional ice hockey defenseman who played 519 games in the National Hockey League between 1976 and 1985. Anderson was a member of the United States National team at the 1977 Ice Hockey World Championships.

== Early life ==
He played high school hockey for Washburn High School in Minneapolis where he was also a standout football player. After getting a scholarship to play college football for the University of Minnesota Anderson found himself injured with a torn Achilles tendon. Thinking his athletic career was over, Herb Brooks came to the training room and told Anderson to try out for the Gopher hockey team. Russ Anderson made the team and ended up winning an NCAA Championship in 1976.

== Playing career ==
Russ Anderson, nicknamed "Andy" played hockey in the NHL from 1976 until 1985. He played for the Pittsburgh Penguins, Hartford Whalers, and Los Angeles Kings. He was also a member of the United States National team at the 1977 Ice Hockey World Championships.

== Personal life ==
While playing with the Penguins, Anderson married Miss America 1977 Dorothy Benham. The couple had four children together. Anderson and Benham were married for several years before divorcing. He now is remarried to Diane Anderson and they reside in Connecticut.

== Career statistics ==
=== Regular season and playoffs ===
			Regular season					Playoffs
Season	Team	League	GP	G	A	Pts	PIM	GP	G	A	Pts	PIM
1972–73	Washburn High School	HS-MN	—	—	—	—	—	—	—	—	—	—
1973–74	Washburn High School	HS-MN	—	—	—	—	—	—	—	—	—	—
1974–75	University of Minnesota	WCHA	30	2	7	9	56	—	—	—	—	—
1975–76	University of Minnesota	WCHA	28	0	5	5	81	—	—	—	—	—
1976–77	Hershey Bears	AHL	11	0	4	4	35	—	—	—	—	—
1976–77	Pittsburgh Penguins	NHL	66	2	11	13	81	3	0	1	1	14
1977–78	Pittsburgh Penguins	NHL	74	2	16	18	150	—	—	—	—	—
1978–79	Pittsburgh Penguins	NHL	72	3	13	16	93	2	0	0	0	0
1979–80	Pittsburgh Penguins	NHL	76	5	22	27	150	5	0	2	2	14
1980–81	Pittsburgh Penguins	NHL	34	3	14	17	112	—	—	—	—	—
1981–82	Pittsburgh Penguins	NHL	31	0	1	1	98	—	—	—	—	—
1981–82	Hartford Whalers	NHL	25	1	3	4	85	—	—	—	—	—
1982–83	Hartford Whalers	NHL	57	0	6	6	171	—	—	—	—	—
1983–84	Los Angeles Kings	NHL	70	5	12	17	126	—	—	—	—	—
1984–85	New Haven Nighthawks	AHL	6	0	2	2	2	—	—	—	—	—
1984–85	Los Angeles Kings	NHL	14	1	1	2	20	—	—	—	—	—
NHL totals			519	22	99	121	1086	10	0	3	3	28

=== International ===
Year	Team	Event	GP	G	A	Pts	PIM
1977	United States	WC	10	0	0	0	16
Senior totals			10	0	0	0	16

Preceded by Dave Keon	Hartford Whalers captain 1982–83	Succeeded by Mark Johnson
