= Wade Koehl =

American football player (born 1984)

Personal information
- Nationality: United States
- Born: September 22, 1984 (age 41) Abilene, Texas, U.S.
- Education: University of Houston
- Occupation: Entrepreneur
- Years active: 2003-
- Height: 6.2 ft (189 cm)
- Weight: 230 lb (104 kg)
- Spouse: Blaire Pancake (2010-)

Sport
- Sport: American football
- Position: Linebacker
- University team: Houston Cougars football, University of Houston
- League: National Football League; All American Football League
- Team: New Orleans Saints; Team Texas
- Updated on 28 March 2016

Wade Koehl (born September 22, 1984) is an American former football player. While playing college football, he was a linebacker for the University of Houston 2003–2006. He subsequently signed for the New Orleans Saints 2007 and for Team Texas 2008. Koehl registered 300 tackles, was placed on the watch list for the Butkus Award and the Lombardi Award, and was a finalist for the Wuerffel Trophy and a semifinalist for the Draddy Award.

== Biography ==
Koehl was born in Abilene, Texas to George and Diann Koehl, and grew up in Killeen, Texas. He recalled playing "a lot of football in the backyard" in Killeen, and boxing as well. As a teenager, his family moved to Midland, Texas, where Koehl attended Midland High School. His father, who had a Master's degree in music composition, was employed as the minister of music at the Southern Baptist First Baptist Church of Midland.

Following high school, Koehl attended University of Houston as a business major, where he initiated his career as a professional football player. He also a member of the National Honor Society.

In 2010, Koehl married Blaire Pancake, a former beauty pageant titled Miss Tennessee in 2006.

== American football ==
In 2003, Koehl, who had been a star football player at Midland High School, announced his commitment to play college football for the University of Houston. He was a linebacker for the Houston Cougars football team from 2003 to 2006. A four-year starter, Koehl had 300 tackles in his playing career at Houston. He was named to watch lists for both the Butkus Award (awarded to the nation's best collegiate linebacker) in 2004 and the Lombardi Award (awarded to the nation's top lineman, including tight ends and linebackers) in 2005. In 2006, Koehl helped lead Houston to its first Conference USA championship in a decade and a berth in the Liberty Bowl.

Koehl also received multiple honors for his academic performance and community service. He was a unanimous choice for the Conference USA All-Academic team in 2006. He was also named to ESPN The Magazine's Academic All-District First-team, a finalist for the Wuerffel Trophy, and a semifinalist for the Draddy Award, also known as "the academic Heisman."

In April 2007, Koehl signed a contract to play professional football in the National Football League for the New Orleans Saints. He was released by the Saints before the start of the 2007 regular season. He next signed to in the All American Football League (AAFL) for Team Texas. However, in March 2008, the AAFL announced that its 2008 season had been cancelled.
