= Miss Minnesota =

Beauty pageant competition

- Formation: 1925
- Type: Beauty pageant
- Headquarters: Cottage Grove
- Location: Minnesota
- Members: Miss America
- Official language: English
- Website: Official website

Anna Brennan, Miss Minnesota 2026

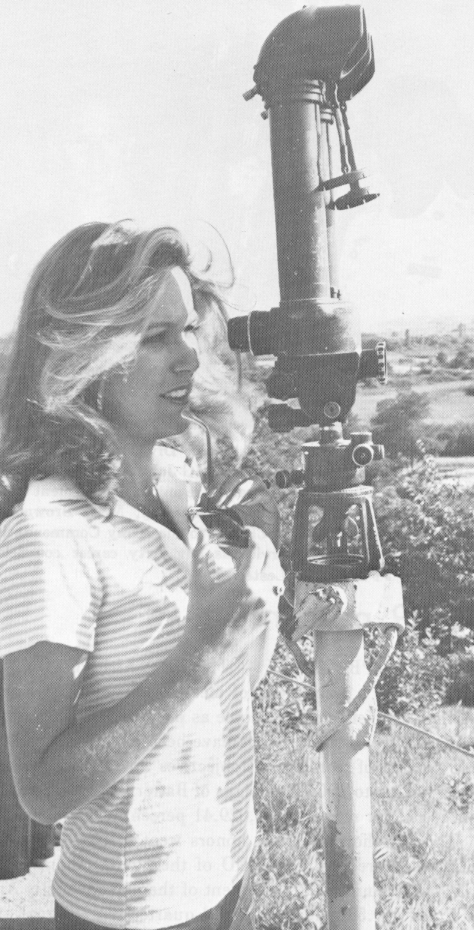
Dorothy Benham, Miss Minnesota 1976 and Miss America 1977

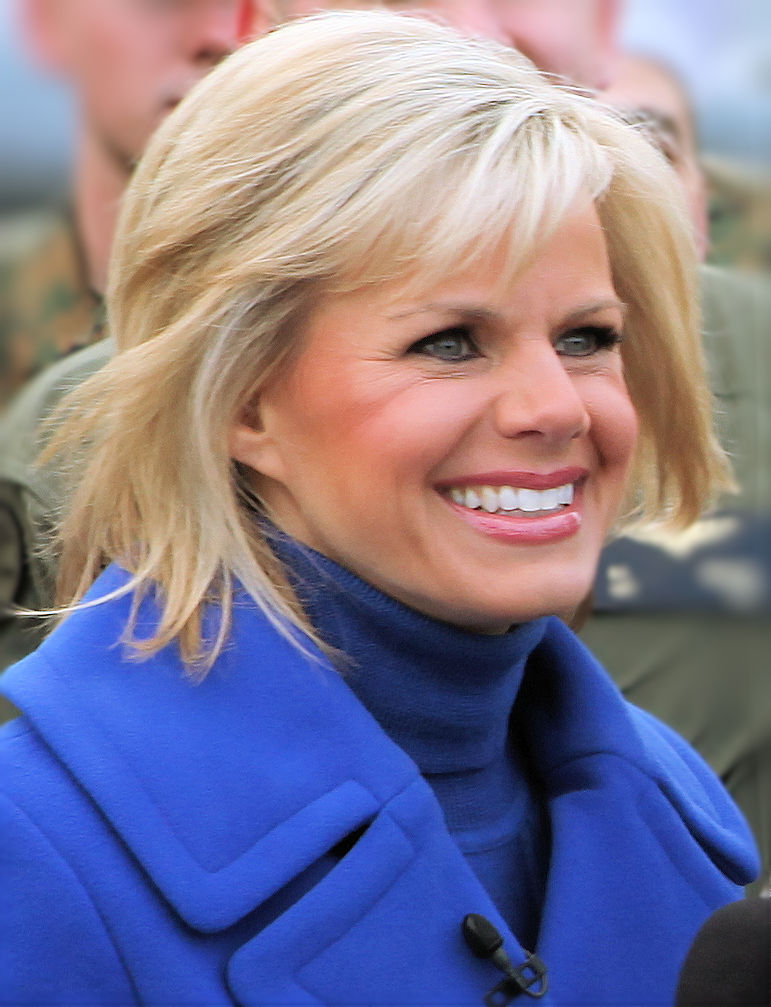
Gretchen Carlson, Miss Minnesota 1988 and Miss America 1989

The Miss Minnesota competition is the pageant that selects the representative for the state of Minnesota in the Miss America pageant. Women from Minnesota have won the Miss America crown on three occasions. The most recent winner was Gretchen Carlson in 1989.

Anna Brennan of Byron was crowned Miss Minnesota 2026 on June 19, 2026, at the Treasure Island Resort & Casino in Welch, Minnesota. She competed for the title of Miss America 2027 on September 6, 2026, at the Kravis Center for the Performing Arts in West Palm Beach, Florida.

== Results summary ==
The following is a visual summary of the past results of Miss Minnesota titleholders at the national Miss America pageants/competitions. The year in parentheses indicates the year of the national competition during which a placement and/or award was garnered, not the year attached to the contestant's state title.

=== Placements ===
- Miss America: BeBe Shopp (1948), Dorothy Benham (1977), Gretchen Carlson (1989)
- 1st runners-up: Elaine Campbell (1947)
- 2nd runners-up: N/A
- 3rd runners-up: Lauren Susan Green (1985)
- 4th runners-up: Arlene Anderson (1945), Nancee Parkinson (1962), Barbara Hasselberg (1965), Judy Mendenhall (1970), Rebecca Yeh (2014)
- Top 10: Florence Hunton (1943), Charlotte Sims (1968), Sheila Bernhagen (1972), Laurie Saarinen (1983)
- Top 12: Patricia Cummings (1944)
- Top 15: Lucille McGinty (1925), Marion Rudeen (1939), Gloria Burkhart (1949), Michaelene Karlen (2019)

=== Awards ===
==== Preliminary awards ====
- Preliminary Lifestyle and Fitness: BeBe Shopp (1948), Nancee Parkinson (1962), Judy Mendenhall (1970), Dorothy Benham (1977), Sue Erickson (1979), Debra Goodwin (1981)
- Preliminary Talent: Marion Rudeen (1939), Arlene Anderson (1945), Elaine Campbell (1947), Gloria Burkhart (1949), Barbara Hasselberg (1965), Judy Mendenhall (1970), Dorothy Benham (1977), Lauren Susan Green (1985), Gretchen Carlson (1989), Rebecca Yeh (2014), Brianna Drevlow (2018)

==== Non-finalist awards ====
- Non-finalist Talent: Keri Thorne (1976), Debra Goodwin (1981), Jo Bender (1993), Shawna Deeann Stoltenberg (1994), Jennifer Ostergaard (1998), Karyn Stordahl (2006), Nicole Swanson (2007), Brooke Kilgarriff (2010), Kathryn Knuttila (2011), Brianna Drevlow (2018)

==== Other awards ====
- Miss Congeniality: Madeline Van Ert (2017)
- Louanne Gamba Instrumental Award: Kathryn Knuttila (2011), Rebecca Yeh (2014)
- Quality of Life Award Winners: Jennifer Ostergaard (1998)
- Quality of Life Award Finalists: Jennifer Hudspeth (2008), Brooke Kilgarriff (2010), Kathryn Knuttila (2011), Natalie Davis (2012), Brianna Drevlow (2018)
- STEM Scholarship Finalist: Gabrielle "Elle" Mark (2022)
- Waterford Business Management & Marketing Award: Paula Knoll (1996)

== Winners ==
- Declared as winner
- Ended as a runner-up
- Ended as a finalist or semi-finalist

Year	Name	Hometown	Age	Local Title	Miss America Talent	Placement at Miss America	Special scholarships at Miss America	Notes
2026	Anna Brennan	Byron	20	Miss Twin Cities	Classical Ballet en Pointe			
2025	Emma Vrieze	Park Rapids	20	Miss Glacial Waters	Vocal			
2024	Emily Rae Schumacher	Mankato	24	Miss Mankato	Dance "Elvis Has Left the Building”	Top 11		Previously Miss Minnesota's Outstanding Teen 2017 Older sister of Miss Minnesota's Outstanding Teen 2022, Julia Schumacher
2023	Angelina Amerigo	Woodbury	22	Miss West Central	Dance			
2022	Rachel Evangelisto	Minneapolis	24	Miss Winona	Praying Mantis Kung Fu			First Native American Miss Minnesota
2021	Gabrielle (Elle) Louise Mark	Red Wing	25	Miss St. Croix Valley	Vocal		STEM Scholarship Finalist	
2019–20	Kathryn Kueppers	Mendota Heights	21	Miss Coon Rapids	Vocal			Daughter of Miss Minnesota 1983, Vicki Plaster Kueppers Previously Miss Minnesota Sweetheart 2018; Top 10 finalist at National Sweetheart 2018 pageant
2018	Michaelene Karlen	Kasson	23	Miss South Central	Contemporary Ballet, "Symphony No. 3" by Philip Glass	Top 15		
2017	Brianna Drevlow	Thief River Falls	23	Miss North Star	Classical Piano, Rhapsody in Blue		Non-finalist Talent Award Preliminary Talent Award Quality of Life Award Finalist	
2016	Madeline Van Ert	Rochester	19	Miss River Valley	Piano/Vocal, "What a Wonderful World"		Miss Congeniality	Top 10 at National Sweetheart 2015 pageant
2015	Rachel Latuff	Hastings	24	Miss Olmsted County	Contemporary Ribbon Dance, "Out of the Woods"			Contestant at National Sweetheart 2014 pageant Later Miss Minnesota USA 2026
2014	Savannah Cole	Brainerd	19	Miss Southern Valley	Vocal, "The House of the Rising Sun"			
2013	Rebecca Yeh	Nisswa	20	Miss Northwest	Violin, "Scherzo Tarantelle" by Henryk Wieniawski	4th runner-up	Louanne Gamba Instrumental Award Preliminary Talent Award	
2012	Siri Freeh	Lake Park	22	Miss Northwest	Lyrical Dance, "Make Us One"			
2011	Natalie Davis	Dassel	21	Miss Mankato	Vocal, "Unexpected Song"		Quality of Life Award Finalist	Previously Miss Minnesota's Outstanding Teen 2006; Contestant at National Sweetheart 2009 pageant
2010	Kathryn Knuttila	Detroit Lakes	23	Miss Twin Cities	Original Piano Composition, "Quintessence"		Louanne Gamba Instrumental Award Non-finalist Talent Award Quality of Life Award Finalist	Sister of Miss Minnesota 2001, Kari Knuttila
2009	Brooke Kilgarriff	Eagan	20	Miss Twin Cities	Vocal, "Somebody to Love"		Non-finalist Talent Award Quality of Life Award Finalist	
2008	Angela McDermott	Austin	24	Miss Twin Cities	Vocal, "You Don't Own Me"			
2007	Jennifer Hudspeth	Apple Valley	23	Miss Mankato	Vocal, "Life of the Party" from The Wild Party		Quality of Life Award Finalist	
2006	Nicole Swanson	Lakeville	24	Miss Twin Cities	Classical Viola, "Etude Speciale Opus 36, No. 29" by Jacques Féréol Mazas		Non-finalist Talent Award	
2005	Karyn Stordahl	Owatonna	24	Miss Heart of the Lakes	Classical Piano Medley, "Malagueña," "Prelude in G minor," "Fantaisie-Impromptu," & "Clair de Lune"		Non-finalist Talent Award	Married to NFL player Ben Utecht
2004	Tiffany Ogle	Waverly	24	Miss Metropolitan	Broadway Vocal, "Nothing" from A Chorus Line			Co-host of morning show The Morning Blend for Milwaukee's WTMJ-TV
2003	Megan Torgerson	Warren	23	Miss Coon Rapids	Classical Vocal, "Una Voce Poco Fa" from The Barber of Seville			
2002	Allyson Kearns	Eden Prairie	22	Miss Twin Cities	Dance, "I Hope I Get It" from A Chorus Line			
2001	Kari Knuttila	Detroit Lakes	21	Miss Twin Cities	Classical Piano, "Sonata in B Minor" by Liszt			Sister of Miss Minnesota 2010, Kathryn Knuttila
2000	Katherine Hill	Wayzata	23	Miss Twin Cities	Vocal / Piano, "All by Myself"			
1999	Natalie Lund	New Brighton	21	Miss Central Minnesota	Tap Dance, "Shout And Feel It"			
1998	Megan West	Litchfield	22	Miss Winona	Vocal, "I'm Afraid This Must Be Love"			
1997	Jennifer Ostergaard	Winona	22	Miss Winona	Dramatic Monologue, "Clear Glass Marbles" from Talking With...		Non-finalist Talent Award Quality of Life Award	
1996	Sherry Johnson	Owatonna	22	Miss Winona	Vocal, "Zing! Went the Strings of My Heart"			
1995	Paula Knoll	Moorhead	22	Miss Northwest	Classical Violin, "Csárdás"		Waterford Business Management & Marketing Award	
1994	Eileen Kay Van Driest	Winona	23	Miss Cottage Grove	Classical Flute			
1993	Shawna Deeann Stoltenberg	Coon Rapids	24	Miss Stillwater	Classical Piano		Non-finalist Talent Award	
1992	Jo Bender	Rochester	23	Miss Rochester	Fiddle Medley, "Dixie," "Tennessee River," & "Orange Blossom Special"		Non-finalist Talent Award	
1991	Julie Richardson	Fridley	24	Miss Coon Rapids	Vocal, "Someone Like You" from Jekyll & Hyde			
1990	Brenda Armstrong	Albert Lea	19	Miss Albert Lea	Harp, "La Source" by Alphonse Hasselmans			
1989	Lynne Ann Schacher	East Grand Forks	25	Miss Metropolitan	Ballet / Jazz Dance, Selections from Merrily We Roll Along			
1988	Susan Johnson			Miss Mankato		Did not compete; originally second runner-up, later assumed the title after Carlson won Miss America 1988 and the first runner-up declined to take the title		
1988	Gretchen Elizabeth Carlson	Anoka	22	Miss Cottage Grove	Classical Violin, "Zigeunerweisen"	Winner	Preliminary Talent Award	Former chairwoman of the Miss America Board of Directors Filed a lawsuit against then Fox News Chairman and CEO, Roger Ailes, claiming sexual harassment, which eventually was settled for $20 million Former co-host of Fox & Friends and anchor of The Real Story with Gretchen Carlson
1987	Katherine Killen	Owatonna	20	Miss Owatonna	Vocal, "Tonight"			
1986	Kristine Fouks	Stillwater	23	Miss White Bear Lake	Vocal			Placed as 1st runner-up in the state pageant, assumed the title after Phyliky resigned
1986	Lisa Phyliky					N/A		Resigned due to knee injury
1985	Elizabeth Hunter	Austin	21	Miss Austin	Semi-classical Vocal, "Love Is Where You Find It"			
1984	Lauren Susan Green	Minneapolis	26	Miss Twin Cities	Piano, "Étude Op. 10, No. 4 in C-Sharp Minor" by Frédéric Chopin	3rd runner-up	Preliminary Talent Award	First African-American Miss Minnesota
1983	Vicki Plaster	St. Paul	23	Miss Twin Cities	Vocal Medley, "Just You Wait" & "I Could Have Danced All Night" from My Fair Lady			Mother of Miss Minnesota 2019, Kathryn Kueppers
1982	Laurie Ida Ann Saarinen	Osage	21	Miss Park Rapids	Vocal, "My Man"	Top 10		Previously Miss North Dakota USA 1981
1981	Elizabeth Ruyak	Mankato	20	Miss Mankato	Piano, Fantaisie-Impromptu by Frédéric Chopin			
1980	Debra Goodwin	Austin	20	Miss Austin	Classical Piano		Non-finalist Talent Award Preliminary Swimsuit Award	
1979	Debra Ann Nerby	Rochester	24	Miss Byron	Vocal, "Who Can I Turn To?"			Debra Ann Nerby Desmonde died at age 62 after an expended illness on December 29, 2017
1978	Sue Erickson	Coon Rapids	19	Miss Coon Rapids	Vocal, "With a Song in My Heart"		Preliminary Swimsuit Award	
1977	Kim Fossey	Austin	20	Miss Austin	Popular Vocal, "Mister Melody"			
1976	Mary Catherine Nelson	Winona	19	Miss Winona	Classical piano	Did not compete; later assumed the title after Benham won Miss America 1977		
1976	Mary Catherine Nelson	Winona	19	Miss Winona	Classical piano			Later named Miss La Crosse/Oktoberfest 1979 and placed fourth runner-up to Miss Wisconsin 1979 while attending UW-La Crosse.
1976	Dorothy Benham	Edina	20	Miss South St. Paul	Classical Vocal, "Adele's Laughing Song" from Die Fledermaus	Winner	Preliminary Swimsuit Award Preliminary Talent Award	
1975	Keri Thorne	White Bear Lake	19	Miss White Bear Lake	Flute, "Swingin' Shepherd Blues" by Moe Koffman		Non-finalist Talent Award	
1974	Pam Bernhagen	Bloomington	20	Miss Bloomington	Acrobatic Jazz Ballet, "Fiddler on the Roof"			Sister of Miss Minnesota 1971, Sheila Bernhagen
1973	Joleen Benoit	Farmington	19	Miss Shakopee	Vocal / Guitar, "Danny's Song"			
1972	Linda Hagen	Hampton	22	Miss Saint Paul	Popular Vocal, "Who Will Buy?" from Oliver!			
1971	Sheila Bernhagen	Bloomington	19	Miss Bloomington	Acrobatic Jazz Ballet, "Flim Flam Man"	Top 10		Sister of Miss Minnesota 1974, Pam Bernhagen
1970	Juliana Gabor	South St. Paul	20	Miss South St. Paul	Popular Vocal, "My Coloring Book"			
1969	Judy Mendenhall	Edina	18	Miss Edina	Flute, "The Swiss Shepherd's Song" by Pietro Morlacchi	4th runner-up	Preliminary Talent Award	
1968	Mary Williams	Minneapolis	20	Miss St. Anthony Village	Tap Dance, "Wall Street Rag" by Scott Joplin			
1967	Charlotte Sims	St. Paul	19	Miss Roseville	Acrobatic Dance, "Ebb Tide"	Top 10		
1966	Diane Lindgren	St. Paul	19	Miss White Bear Lake	Folk Singing & Guitar			
1965	Jeanne Ruth	St. Paul	18	Miss Saint Paul	Interpretive Jazz Dance, Selections from West Side Story			
1964	Barbara Hasselberg	Bloomington	21	Miss Bloomington	Authentic Polynesian Dances, "Hawaiian War Chant"	4th runner-up	Preliminary Talent Award	
1963	Sharon Carnes	St. Paul		Miss Saint Paul	Vocal, "Love Is Where You Find It" from The Kissing Bandit			
1962	Judith Lerstad	Bloomington	22	Miss Bloomington	Alto & Bass Saxophone Medley, "Harlem Nocturne," "Misty," & "Hubcaps & Tailgates"			
1961	Nancee Parkinson	West St. Paul	18	Miss West St. Paul	Modern Calypso Jazz Dance	4th runner-up	Preliminary Swimsuit Award	
1960	Jean Marie Elverum	Faribault	22	Miss Faribault	Vocal, "Romany Life" from The Fortune Teller			Jean Elverum Hatton died at age 87 on November 30, 2025, in Lorena, Texas.
1959	Judy Ann Olson	Albert Lea	19	Miss Albert Lea	Modern Dance			Judith Olson Evans died at 84 on October 15, 2024 in Sarasota, Florida.
1958	Diane Albers	St. Paul		Miss Saint Paul	Piano, "Allegro de Concierto" by Enrique Granados			
1957	Ardyce Gustafson	St. Paul		Miss Saint Paul	Vocal Medley from My Fair Lady			
1956	Marie Miller	Winona		Miss Winona	Vocal, "Batti Batti o bel Masette" from Don Giovanni			
1955	Marlyse Reed	Fairmont		Miss Fairmont	Dramatic Monologue from L'Aiglon			
1954	Jeanne Reince	Winona		Miss Winona	Classical Vocal			
1953	Idell Hulin	Minneapolis		Miss Minneapolis	Vocal			
1952	Carole Wick	Duluth		Miss Duluth	Vocal			
1951	Katherine Rose Clark	Minneapolis		Miss Minneapolis	Classical Vocal, "The Jewel Song" from Faust			Kathryn Rose Clark, a native of La Crosse, Wis., was a student the MacPhail School of Music in Minneapolis, Minn. for three years at the time of her state victory. Kathryn Clark Brennan died at 87 in Green Bay, Wisconsin on April 22, 2018.
1950	Jeanne M. Traun	Minneapolis	20	Miss Minneapolis	Vocal			Jeanne M. Traun Grace died at age 92 on January 13, 2024 after a bout with dementia.
1949	Gloria Burkhart	Minneapolis		Miss Minneapolis	Violin, Zigeunerweisen	Top 15	Preliminary Talent Award	
1948	Jean Sheils			Miss Edina		N/A		Assumed the title after Shopp was named Miss America 1948
1948	BeBe Shopp	Hopkins	18	Miss Hopkins	Vibraharp, "Caprice Viennois" by Fritz Kreisler	Winner	Preliminary Swimsuit Award	
1947	Elaine Campbell	Minneapolis		Miss Minneapolis	Classical Vocal, "Je Veux Vivre" from Roméo et Juliette	1st runner-up	Preliminary Talent Award	
1946	Rosemarie Gregg	St. Paul		Miss Saint Paul				
1945	Arlene Anderson	Minneapolis		Miss Minneapolis	Vocal / Marimba, "Ah! Sweet Mystery of Life" from Naughty Marietta	4th runner-up	Preliminary Talent Award	
1944	Patricia Cummings	Minneapolis			Hula	Top 12		
1943	Florence Hunton	Minneapolis			Dramatic Reading from "Désirée’s Baby"	Top 10		
1942	Jane Groerner	Minneapolis						
1941	Patricia Tiets	Minneapolis						
1940	Virginia Kepler	Minneapolis						
1939	Marion Rudeen	Minneapolis			Acrobatic Dance	Top 15	Preliminary Talent Award	
1938	Avis Claire Darrow	Duluth						
1937	Cecelia Rodge	Minneapolis						
1936	Irene Martineau	Minneapolis		Miss Minneapolis				
1935	Mildred Barrett	Marshall						
1934	No national pageant was held							
1933	No Minnesota representative at Miss America pageant							
1932	No national pageants were held							
1931	No national pageants were held							
1930	No national pageants were held							
1929	No national pageants were held							
1928	No national pageants were held							
1927	Sylvia Irene Brenner	Minneapolis		Miss Minneapolis				Competed under local title at Miss America pageant
1926	Florence Fuller	Duluth		Miss Duluth				Multiple Minnesota representatives Contestants competed under local title at Miss America pageant
1926	Helen Katherine Douglas	Minneapolis		Miss Minneapolis				Multiple Minnesota representatives Contestants competed under local title at Miss America pageant
1925	Lucille McGinty	Minneapolis		Miss Minneapolis		Top 15		Multiple Minnesota representatives Contestants competed under local title at Miss America pageant
1925	Dorothy Bastyr	St. Paul		Miss Saint Paul				Multiple Minnesota representatives Contestants competed under local title at Miss America pageant
1924	No Minnesota representative at Miss America pageant							
1923	No Minnesota representative at Miss America pageant							
1922	No Minnesota representative at Miss America pageant							
1921	No Minnesota representative at Miss America pageant							
