= Barbara Jo Walker =

American model (1926–2000)

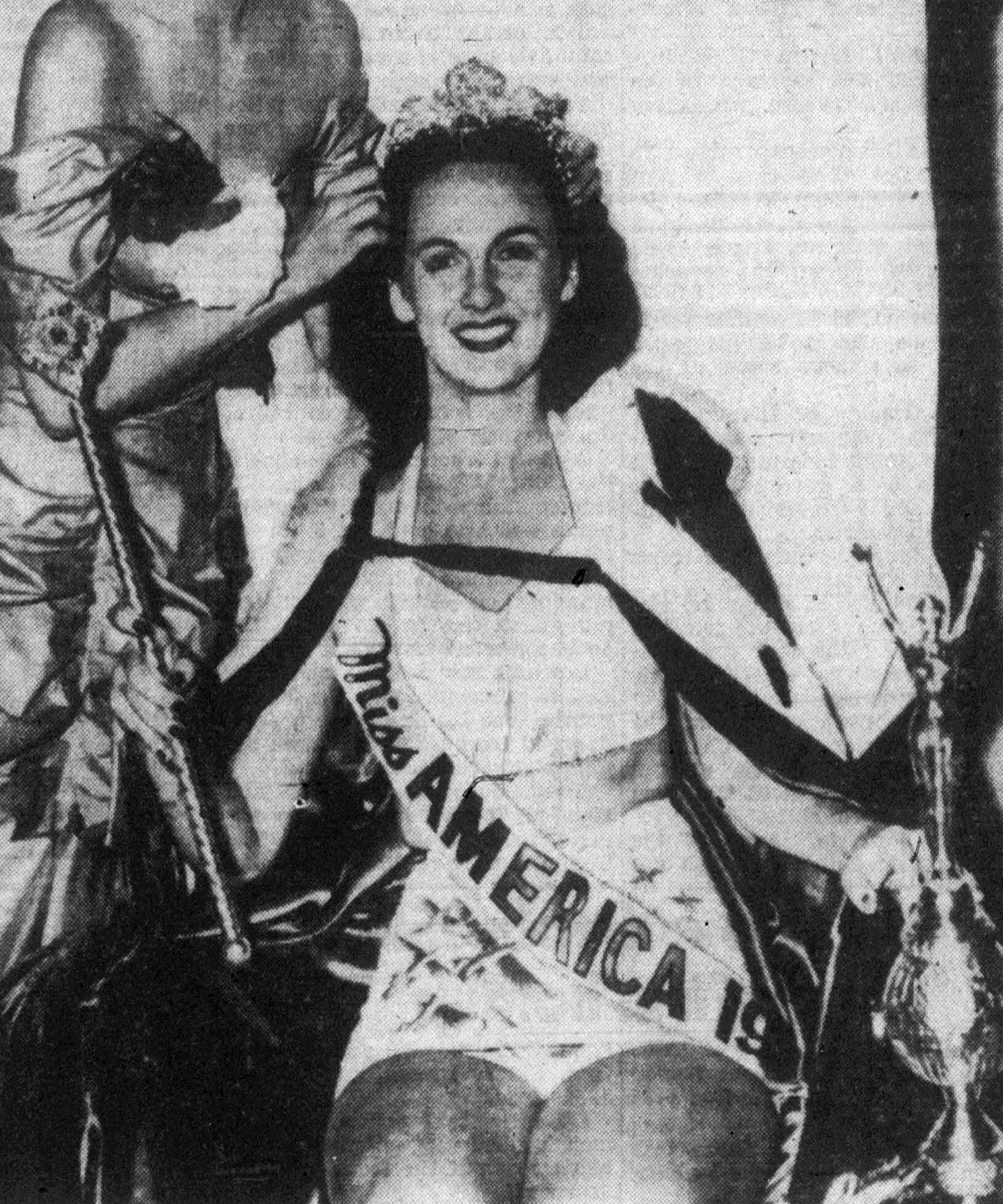
- Walker in 1947
- Born: March 12, 1926
- Died: June 7, 2000 (aged 74); Memphis, Tennessee, U.S.
- Other name: Barbara Jo Walker Hummel
- Education: Memphis State College
- Title: Miss America 1947
- Predecessor: Marilyn Buferd
- Successor: BeBe Shopp

Barbara Jo Walker Hummel (March 12, 1926 – June 7, 2000) won the Miss America pageant in 1947. Walker was from Memphis, Tennessee and competed at the Miss America 1947 pageant as Miss Memphis. After her Miss America reign, she married John Vernon Hummel and had three children; she resided in Memphis, Tennessee with her family until she died in 2000.

== Life ==
Walker was the daughter of Mr. and Mrs. Robert H. Walker. Her father operated a dental laboratory, and she had a sister, Peggy. She attended the Memphis State College and is an alumna of Alpha Gamma Delta sorority. Walker was a Sunday School teacher when she won Miss America. After her Miss America reign ended, she returned to Memphis to finish her college degree and continue teaching Sunday School rather than pursuing an entertainment career. She sang at the Second Presbyterian Church in Memphis for over 36 years.

On June 26, 1948, Walker married physician John Vernon Hummel in Memphis, Tennessee. She and her husband had three children (two sons and one daughter) including the late Andy Hummel of the Memphis-based power pop band Big Star.

She died in Memphis, Tennessee, on June 7, 2000.

== Miss America Reign ==
Walker won the Miss America pageant as Miss Memphis; she is the last city representative to win the crown (all successive Miss America winners represented states rather than cities). She was the last Miss America to be crowned in her bathing suit; all since 1947 have been crowned in their evening gowns. At the pageant, Walker sang and played piano. Walker won a $5,000 scholarship and $10,000 in personal appearance and endorsement contracts.

Awards and achievements
Preceded by Marilyn Buferd	Miss America; 1947	Succeeded by BeBe Shopp
Preceded by -	Miss Memphis; 1947	Succeeded by Lois Welch
