= Hannah Robison =

American beauty pageant titleholder

- Born: Hannah Williams Robison; January 4, 1994 (age 32)
- Education: University of Tennessee at Martin
- Beauty pageant titleholder
- Title: Miss Tennessee Valley 2013; Miss Scenic City 2015; Miss Tennessee 2015
- Hair color: Brown
- Eye color: Brown
- Major competition: Miss America 2016

Hannah Williams Robison (born January 4, 1994) is an American beauty pageant titleholder from Paris, Tennessee, who was crowned Miss Tennessee 2015. She competed for the Miss America 2016 crown and placed in the Top 7 finalists.

== Pageant career ==
=== Early pageants ===
Robison began playing the piano at age 7 and competing in pageants when she was just 12 years old. Her first pageant was at "The World's Biggest Fish Fry" festival in Paris, Tennessee. In 2010, at age 16, Robison was named "Hostess Princess" at the World's Biggest Fish Fry event. (Her mother, Pam, won the Hostess Princess title in 1979.) Also in 2010, she won the title "Tennessee's Miss Teen All American" and was named "Fairest of the Fair" at the Henry County Fair. Robison won the statewide Tennessee's Fairest of the Fair title in 2011.

=== Vying for Miss Tennessee ===
On October 28, 2012, Robison won the Miss Tennessee Valley 2013 title. She competed as one of 36 qualifiers in the 2013 Miss Tennessee pageant with the platform "Student Advocacy for Underprivileged Children" and a piano performance in the talent portion of the competition. She was named was second runner-up to winner Shelby Thompson. Robison also received recognition as winner of the pageant's swimsuit competition.

Robison did not compete in the 2014 Miss Tennessee pageant to concentrate on earning her degree.

=== Miss Tennessee 2015 ===
In a local qualifying pageant held on the campus of Chattanooga State Community College, Robison was crowned Miss Scenic City 2015 on July 19, 2014. She entered the Miss Tennessee pageant in June 2015 as one of 36 qualifiers for the state title. Robison's competition talent was performing the Latin music standard "El Cumbanchero" by Rafael Hernández Marín on the piano. Her platform is "Campaign Against Pain: Arthritis Awareness".

Robison won the competition at the Carl Perkins Civic Center in Jackson, Tennessee, on Saturday, June 20, 2015, when she received her crown from outgoing Miss Tennessee titleholder Hayley Lewis. She earned more than $18,000 in scholarship money and prizes from the state pageant. As Miss Tennessee, her activities include public appearances across the state of Tennessee.

=== Vying for Miss America ===
Robison was Tennessee's representative at the Miss America 2016 pageant in Atlantic City, New Jersey, in September 2015. Robison was the "America's Choice" winner in online voting and advanced automatically to the Top 15 semi-finalists. In the televised finale on September 13, 2015, she performed a piano solo of Liberace's arrangement "El Cumbanchero" during the talent portion of the competition. During the interview portion, she was asked whether federal funding for Planned Parenthood should be cut off and she answered that it should not. Robison placed in the Top 7 finalists as earned a $7,000 scholarship award.

== Early life and education ==
Robison is a native of Paris, Tennessee. She is a 2011 graduate of Henry County High School. Her father is Rusty Robison and her mother is Pam Williams Robison. Robison has two older sisters, Rachel and Leah.

As of 2015 Robison was a student at University of Tennessee at Martin where she was studying classes with plans to obtain a bachelor's degree in chemistry with a minor in psychology. While a student at UT Martin, Robison became a member of the Alpha Omicron Pi international women's fraternity. She is the fourth UT Martin student to be crowned Miss Tennessee.

Awards and achievements
Preceded by Hayley Lewis	Miss Tennessee; 2015	Succeeded by Grace Burgess
