= Dorothy Benham =

American beauty pageant winner

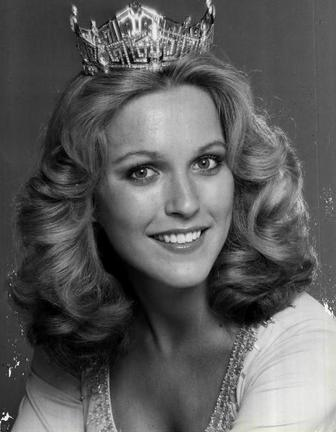
- Benham in 1977
- Born: December 11, 1955 (age 70); Edina, Minnesota
- Education: Southwest High School
- Occupation: Actor
- Title: Miss Minnesota 1976; Miss America 1977
- Predecessor: Tawny Godin
- Successor: Susan Perkins
- Spouses: Russ Anderson (m. 1978; div. 1989) Michael McGowan (m. 1991; div. 1999) Paul Shoemaker (m. 2001; div. 2011)
- Children: 6

Dorothy Kathleen Benham (born December 11, 1955) is an American beauty pageant titleholder from Edina, Minnesota who was Miss Minnesota in 1976 and Miss America in 1977.

== Early life ==
Benham was born to Archie and Mary Dorothy Tuomi Benham. She attended Southwest High School in Minneapolis, MN and graduated in 1973. She sang in her high school choir. She has one sister named Totiana and two brothers, named Sean and Archibald.

== Personal life ==
On May 26, 1978, she married Russell Anderson, an American ice hockey defenseman in the NHL who played for the Pittsburgh Penguins. The couple had four children, Adam (born 1980), Russell (born 1982), Ben (born 1985), and Mia (born 1988).

On December 31, 1991, she married Michael McGowan with whom she has two children, named Madeline (born 1994) and Richard (born 1995).

On August 28, 2001, she married Paul Shoemaker. The couple divorced in 2011.

On February 22, 2022 Dorothy married Luis Martin Perez.

== Career ==
Benham appeared in the Tony award-winning Broadway musical, Jerome Robbins' Broadway in 1989 and also performed on the Crystal Cathedral television program, Hour of Power.

Awards and achievements
Preceded by Tawny Godin	Miss America; 1977	Succeeded by Susan Perkins
Preceded by Kerri Thorne	Miss Minnesota; 1976	Succeeded by Mary Nelson
