= BeBe Shopp =

American beauty pageant titleholder (1930–2025)

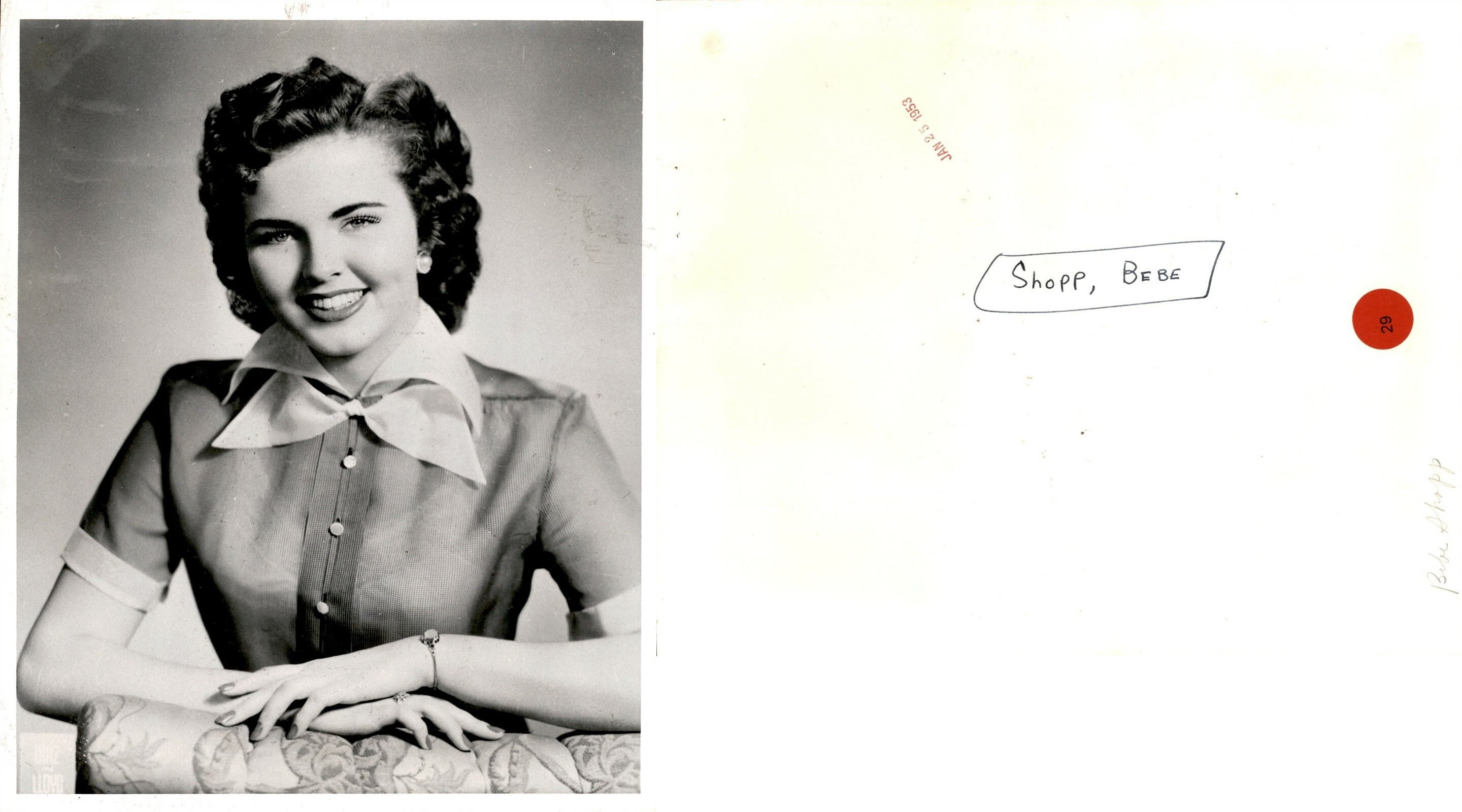
- Shopp in 1953
- Born: Beatrice Bella Shopp; August 17, 1930; Hopkins, Minnesota, U.S.
- Died: October 4, 2025 (aged 95); Rockport, Massachusetts, U.S.
- Education: Manhattan School of Music
- Title: Miss Minnesota 1948; Miss America 1948
- Predecessor: Barbara Jo Walker
- Successor: Jacque Mercer
- Spouse: Bayard D. Waring (m. 1954; died 2022)
- Children: 4

Beatrice Bella "BeBe" Shopp (August 17, 1930 – October 4, 2025) was an American beauty pageant titleholder. From Hopkins, Minnesota, she was Miss America in 1948.

== Post-Pageant career ==
After winning Miss America 1948, Shopp used her pageant scholarship to attend the Manhattan School of Music. She specialized in the vibraharp and graduated with a degree in percussion in 1952. She sang with Share the Music and the Cape Ann Symphony Chorus. She was active in community affairs and headed the board of directors for Gloucester Stage Company.

Near the end of her Miss America reign while traveling in France, Shopp was asked about women wearing two-piece bathing suits, to which she replied, "I don't approve of Bikini suits for American girls...The French girls can wear them if they want to, but I still don't approve of them on American girls."

== Personal life and death ==
Shopp married Korean War navigator Lt. Bayard D. Waring in 1954 and later had four daughters. As of 2000, she lived in Rockport, Massachusetts, and was known by her married name, Beatrice "Bea" Waring. She was a lay minister in the Episcopal Church and a TV spokeswoman for an electric scooter company. Shopp died in Rockport on October 4, 2025, at the age of 95.

Awards and achievements
| Preceded by Barbara Jo Walker | Miss America; 1948 | Succeeded by Jacque Mercer |
| Preceded by Elaine Campbell | Miss Minnesota; 1948 | Succeeded by Jean Sheils |
