= Hayley Lewis (model) =

American beauty contestant and sports anchor

- Born: June 7, 1993 (age 33); Kansas City, Missouri
- Education: Belmont University
- Occupation: Sportscaster
- Beauty pageant titleholder
- Title: Miss Tennessee
- Hair color: Blonde
- Eye color: Blue
- Major competition: Miss America 2015 (Top 10)

Hayley Lewis (born June 7, 1993) is an American model, singer, and sportscaster. She was crowned Miss Tennessee on June 22, 2014, at the Carl Perkins Civic Center in Jackson, Tennessee. Her singing group placed fourth in the world in a Times Square vocal competition. Lewis supports the Children's Miracle Network after receiving support from a badly broken arm when she was four years old. She worked as a sports anchor at KSHB-TV at Kansas City, Missouri from 2019-2023.

== Early life and college ==
Lewis was born in Kansas City, Missouri and graduated from Belmont University She interned at WKRN-TV in Nashville, Tennessee while at college.

== Career ==
Before going to KSHB-TV and back to her hometown in 2019, she worked at KEZI at Eugene, Oregon.

Awards and achievements
Preceded by Shelby Thompson	Miss Tennessee; 2014	Succeeded by Hannah Robison
