= Marilyn Buferd =

American actress

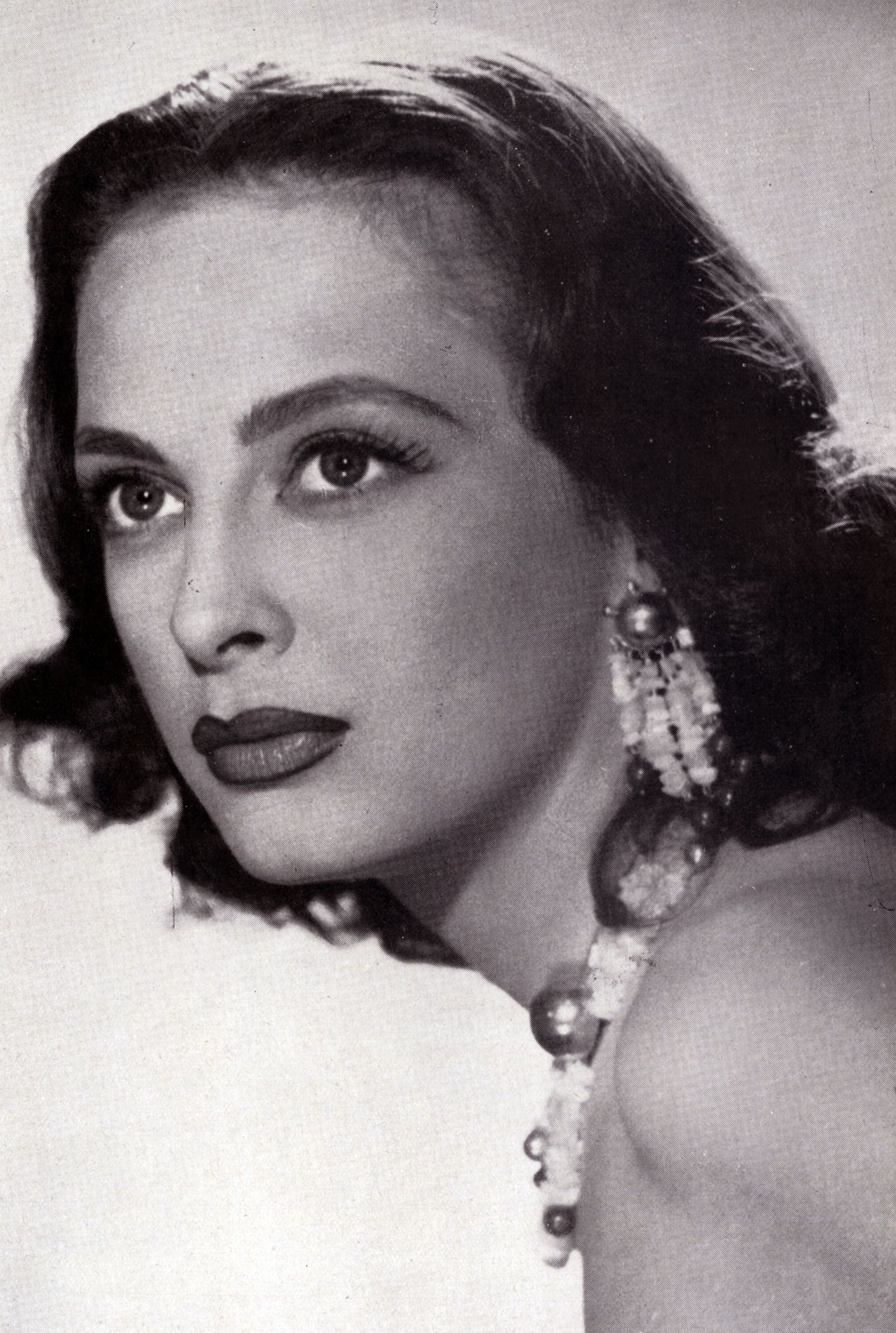
- Buferd in 1953
- Born: January 30, 1925; Detroit, Michigan, U.S.
- Died: March 27, 1990 (aged 65); Austin, Texas, U.S.
- Occupation: Actress
- Height: 5 ft 8 in (1.73 m)
- Title: Miss America 1946
- Predecessor: Bess Myerson
- Successor: Barbara Jo Walker
- Spouses: Count Francesco Barbaro (m. 1951; div. 1954); Hans E. Orton (m. 1958; div. 1959); Milton Stevens (m. 1960; died 1969)
- Children: Nick Barbaro

Marilyn Buferd (January 30, 1925 – March 27, 1990) was an American film and television actress as well as the winner of both the Miss California and Miss America pageants of 1946. During the latter half of the 1940s and throughout the 1950s, she performed in nearly two dozen American, Italian, and French films, including Touchez pas au grisbi opposite Jean Gabin (1954). Buferd also appeared in several television series originally broadcast in the 1950s, such as The Millionaire, Highway Patrol, Schlitz Playhouse, The Ford Television Theatre, and Orient Express.

== Biography ==
Buferd attended the University of California, Los Angeles. One of the sixteen finalists she defeated in the Miss America 1946 pageant was future Academy Award-winning actress Cloris Leachman.

Buferd married Franco Barbaro, an Italian submarine commander and a movie agent and producer. After divorcing she married Hans E. Orton. Her third husband was Milton Stevens. Buferd died of pancreatic cancer at age 65 in Austin, Texas, on March 27, 1990. Her son, Nick Barbaro, is publisher of The Austin Chronicle and co-founder of South by Southwest.

== Selected filmography ==
- A Night of Fame (1949)
- Totò Tarzan (1950)
- The Elusive Twelve (1950)
- I'm the Capataz (1951)
- The Blind Woman of Sorrento (1952)
- Les Belles de nuit (1952) directed by René Clair
- The Machine to Kill Bad People (1952) directed by Roberto Rossellini
- Touchez pas au grisbi (1954) directed by Jacques Becker
- The Unearthly (1957)
- Queen of Outer Space (1958)

Awards and achievements
| Preceded by Bess Myerson | Miss America; 1946 | Succeeded by Barbara Jo Walker |
| Preceded by Polly Ellis | Miss California; 1946 | Succeeded by Laura Emery |
