= Miss America 1947 =

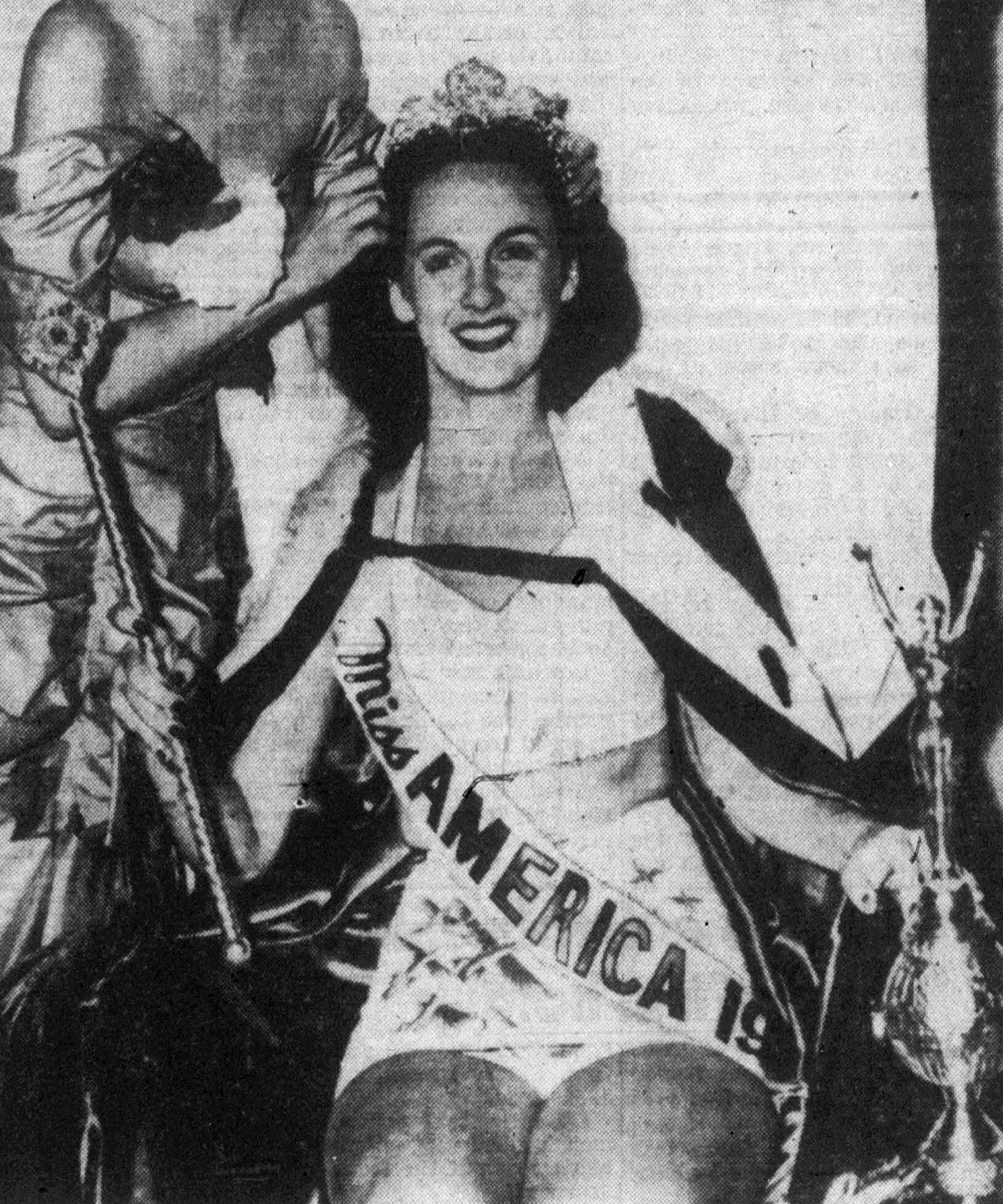
- Date: September 6, 1947
- Venue: Boardwalk Hall, Atlantic City, New Jersey
- Entrants: 54
- Placements: 15
- Winner: Barbara Jo Walker; Memphis

Miss America 1947, the 21st Miss America pageant, was held at the Boardwalk Hall in Atlantic City, New Jersey on September 6, 1947. Barbara Jo Walker was the last Miss America to be crowned in her swimsuit, as well as the last contestant to represent just a city, rather than her state. Margaret Marshall, representing Canada, captured the swimsuit competition and placed third overall in the pageant. The judges for the Miss America pageant were Win Barron (Paramount's representative in Canada), Vincent Trotta (head of National Screen Service art department), Walter Thornton (head of the Walter Thornton Model Agency), and Arthur William Brown (noted illustrator).

== Results ==
=== Placements ===
Placement	Contestant
Miss America 1947	Memphis – Barbara Jo Walker
1st Runner-Up	Minnesota – Elaine Mary Campbell
2nd Runner-Up	Canada – Margaret Marshall
3rd Runner-Up	Alabama – Peggy June Elder
4th Runner-Up	California – Laura Jean Emery
Top 15	Arizona – Wanda Jo Law; Kentucky – Evelyn L. Murray; Miami – Pepper Donna Shore; New Jersey – Delores Mendes; New York City – Raven Malone; Oregon – Jo Ann Amorde; Pittsburgh – Lillian Handford; Tennessee – Georgia Jean Cunningham; West Virginia – Joan Elizabeth Estep; Wyoming – Dorothy June McKay

=== Awards ===
==== Preliminary awards ====
Awards	Contestant
Lifestyle and Fitness	Alabama - Peggy June Elder (tie); Canada - Margaret Marshall; Kentucky - Evelyn L. Murray; New York City - Raven Malone (tie)
Talent	Memphis - Barbara Jo Walker; Miami - Pepper Donna Shore; Minnesota - Elaine Mary Campbell

=== Other awards ===
Awards	Contestant
Miss Congeniality	Texas - Luna Lynn McClain

== Contestants ==
Title	Name	Hometown	Age	Talent	Placement	Awards	Notes
Alabama	Peggy June Elder	Gadsden		Vocal, "I Wonder Who's Kissing Her Now"	3rd runner-up	Preliminary Lifestyle & Fitness Award	Peggy June Elder Butler died at age 93 on April 30, 2023 at home in Gadsden, Alabama.
Arizona	Wanda Law	Tempe			Top 15		
Arkansas	Pam Camp	Little Rock		Sketching			
Atlanta	Joy Elizabeth Smith	Atlanta		Vocal, "Eccentric Dance"			
Brooklyn	Lynn Faune	Brooklyn		Vocal, "I Come from Brooklyn"			
California	Laura Emery	Salinas	18	Vocal, "So Long for so Long"	4th Runner-up		
Canada	Margaret Marshall	Toronto			2nd Runner-up	Preliminary Lifestyle & Fitness Award	
Chattanooga	Dorothy Cunningham			Tap Dance			
Chicago	Joan Hiatt	Chicago		Vocal, "Kiss in the Dark"			
Colorado	Joyce Haycock	Pueblo		Vocal, "Chi-Baba"			
Connecticut	Louise Bienvenu	Waterbury		Vocal, "On the Sunny Side of the Street"			
Detroit	Jane Rose Foster	Detroit		Vocal, "My Dream Came True"			
(Washington, D.C.) District of Columbia	Margaret Wilson		19	Dance, "Mexican Hat Dance"			
Florida	Eula Ann McGehee	St. Petersburg		Magic Act			
(Georgia (U.S. state)) Georgia	Robbie Sauls	Cuthbert		Vocal, "Smilin' Through"			
Greater Philadelphia	Kay McClane	Philadelphia		Vocal, "Sketching"			
Idaho	Norma Briggs	Pocatello		Drama, Romeo & Juliet			
Illinois	Marce Evans	Joliet		Dress Design & Art			
Indiana	Beverly Trenary	Gary		Vocal, "I'll Close my Eyes"			
Iowa	Ruth Janet Anderson	Oelwein	19	Vocal, "You Made Me Love You"			
Kansas	Ruth Ellen Richmond	Fort Scott		Vocal, "Wonderful One"			
Kentucky	Evelyn L. Murray	Louisville		Samba	Top 15	Preliminary Lifestyle & Fitness Award	
Los Angeles County	Marilyn Davidson	Los Angeles		Vocal/Dress Design, "A Sunday Kind of Love"			
Louisiana	Ruth Mary Blust	New Orleans		Vocal, "This Song is You"			
Louisville	Margaret Allen Hill	Louisville		Vocal/Piano, "It Had to be You"			
Maryland	Carolyn Jean Dixon	Cumberland		Vocal, "It Had to be You"			
Memphis	Barbara Jo Walker	Memphis	21	Art Display & Vocal Medley, "One Kiss" & "Un Bel Di" from Madama Butterfly	Winner	Preliminary Talent Award	
Miami Beach	Pepper Shore	Miami		Interpretive Dance of the South Seas	Top 15	Preliminary Talent Award	
Michigan	Peggy Ellsworth	Reed City		Vocal, "She's Funny That Way"			
Minnesota	Elaine Campbell	Minneapolis		Classical Vocal, "Je Veux Vivre" from Roméo et Juliette	1st Runner-up	Preliminary Talent Award	
Mississippi	Kitty Bailey	Oxford		Painting			
Missouri	Mary Jean Burke	Kansas City		Vocal, "I'm a Big Girl Now"			
Montana	Carol Chaffen	Corvallis		Classical Vocal, "Mon cœur s'ouvre à ta voix" from Samson and Delilah			
New Hampshire	Bernice Loiselle	Manchester		Rumba Dance			
New Jersey	Delores Mendes	Newark		Vocal & Guitar Medley, "I Close my Eyes" & "Siboney"	Top 15		
(New York (state)) New York	Carol Fredericks	Harrison		Tap Dance			
New York City	Raven Malone	New York City		Vocal, "Put the Blame on Mame"	Top 15	Preliminary Lifestyle & Fitness Award	
North Carolina	Alice White	Fayetteville		Vocal, "That's My Desire"			
Ohio	Nancy Nesbitt	Cleveland		Vocal, "I Don't Know Enough About You"			
Omaha	Madalyn Joyce King	Omaha		Tap Dance		Non-finalist Talent Award	
Oregon	Jo Ann Amorde	Sutherlin		Vocal, "Alice Blue Gown" from Irene	Top 15		Mother of Miss Oregon 1974, Juli Ann Berg
Pennsylvania	Dorothy Gresh	Williamsport		Vocal, "Lover, Come to Me"			
Pittsburgh	Lillian Handford	Pittsburgh		Painting Display	Top 15		
Rhode Island	Ellen DiCenzo	Providence		Vocal			
South Carolina	Margaret Griffin	Spartanburg		Classical Vocal			
South Dakota	Roselyn Lea Anderson	Saint Onge		Piano, "'O Sole Mio"			
Tennessee	Georgia Cunningham			Tap Dance	Top 15		
Texas	Luna McClain	Lufkin		Vocal, "Smoke Gets in Your Eyes" & "Cowboy Boogie"		Miss Congeniality	
Utah	Donna Southwck	Cedar City		Drama, Piano, Vocal, & Dance			
Vermont	Barbara Campbell	Montpelier		Vocal, "Blue Skies"			
Virginia	Ruth Ellen Mears	Cape Charles		Speech			
West Virginia	Joan Elizabeth Estep	Wheeling		Piano, "Rhapsody in Blue"	Top 15		
Wisconsin	Gladys Elaine Berkley	Baraboo	19	Monologue			Gladys Elaine Berkley Stracy died of a brief illness in Madison, Wisconsin at age 38 on September 10, 1965.
Wyoming	Dorothy McKay	Cheyenne		Painting Exhibition	Top 15		
