= Nick Barbaro =

American journalist

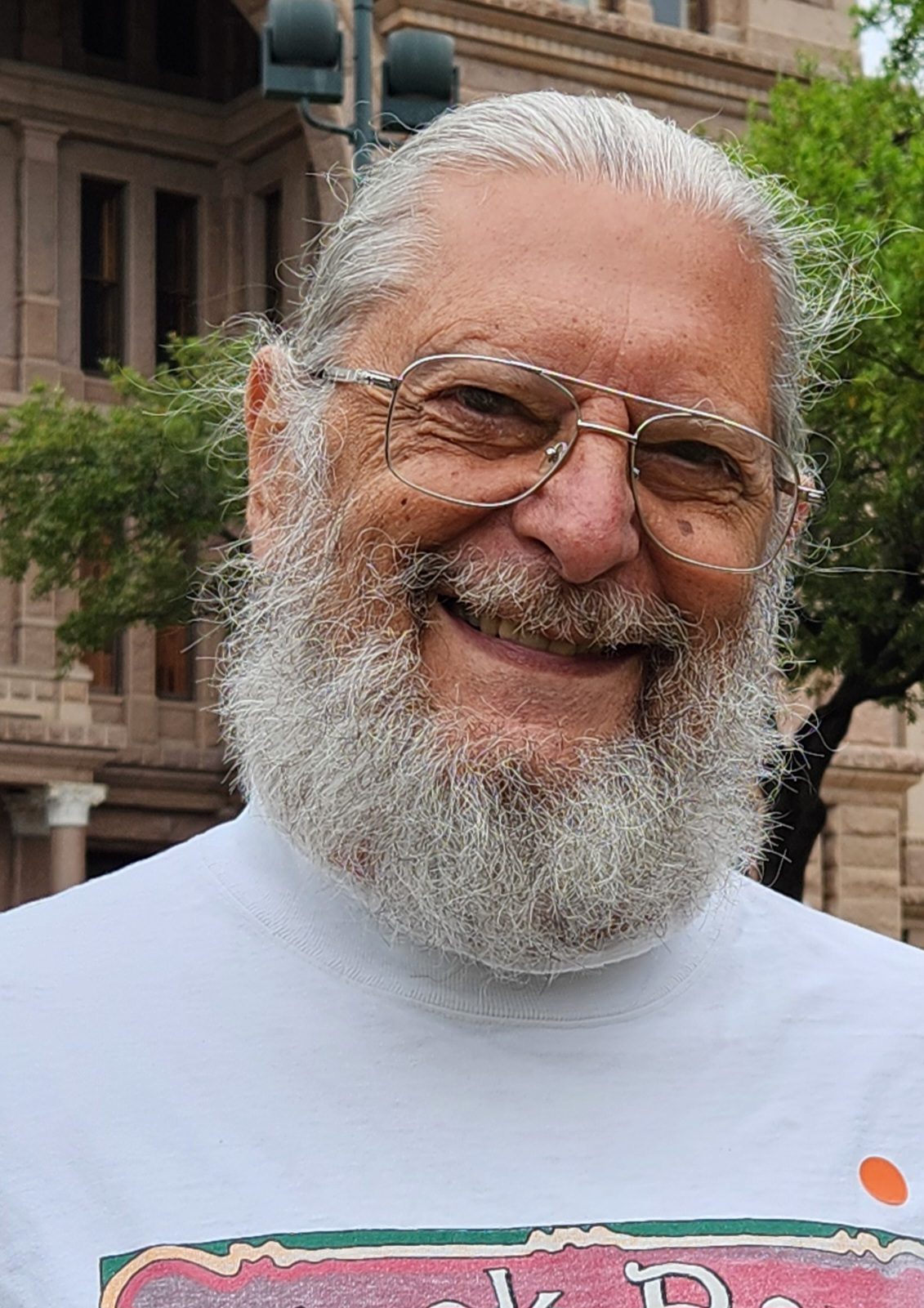
Barbaro at the Texas Capitol, April 8, 2025

Niccolo Raffaele Barbaro (born 1952), better known as Nick Barbaro, is an American journalist and businessman who is the co-founder of The Austin Chronicle and co-creator of the South by Southwest (SXSW) festival. Barbaro's contributions have helped define the Austin, Texas music community.

== Austin Chronicle ==
In 1981 along with Louis Black, Barbaro founded the The Austin Chronicle, an alternative weekly newspaper.

In March 2025, Barbaro retired after 46 years and named Cassidy Frazier as the new publisher. Barbaro will remain as president of the Austin Chronicle Corporation.

== SXSW ==
Barbaro co-owned the South by Southwest festival, which he co-created with Roland Swenson, Louis Black and Louis Jay Meyers in 1987.

SXSW was forced to cancel its March 2020 in-person event during the COVID pandemic. In 2021, faced with possible bankruptcy, SXSW took on Penske as a parner. The partnership with the L.A.-based giant in digital media and information services, enabled SXSW to survive. In August 2026 Barabaro announced he was selling the remainder of his stake in SXSW to Penske.

== Biography ==
Barbaro is the son of Marilyn Buferd (Miss America 1946) and Francesco Barbaro, a WWII Italian submarine commander, movie agent and producer. Barbaro grew up in Los Angeles and also Dallas. He attended UCLA where he developed his interest in cinema.

In the mid-1970s he moved to Austin and enrolled in the University of Texas. There he earned a graduate degree in Radio, Television, and Film. While at UT he worked on The Daily Texan where he served as film critic.

He lives in Austin with his wife Susan Moffat.
