= Grace Gore =

American beauty pageant titleholder

- Education: Vanderbilt University Medical Center
- Beauty pageant titleholder
- Title: Miss Tennessee
- Hair color: Brunette
- Major competitions: Miss America 2008, Miss Teen USA 2002

Grace Gore Sturdivant, AuD is an American beauty pageant titleholder who was named Miss Tennessee 2007 and Miss Mississippi Teen USA 2002.

== Biography ==
She is a doctor of audiology and the founder and president of Graceful Sounds, Inc., a nonprofit organization that provides audiology services and hearing aids to children in need. She has been an assistant professor of audiologist at The University of Mississippi Medical Center.

Awards and achievements
Preceded by Blaire Pancake	Miss Tennessee; 2007	Succeeded by Ellen Carrington
