= Jacque Mercer =

Miss America in 1949 (1931–1982)

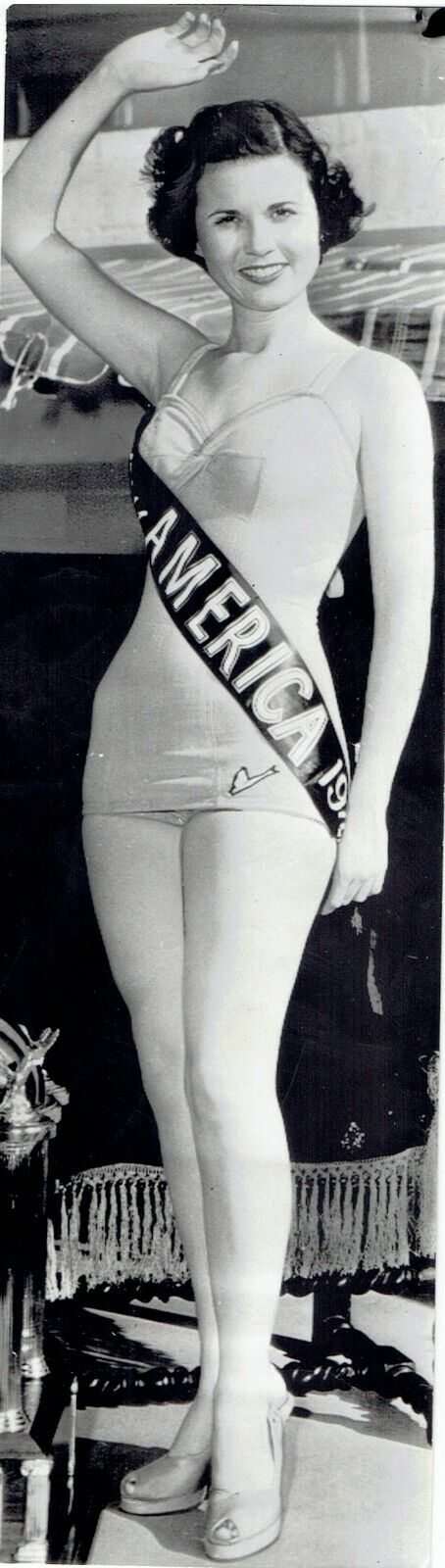
- Mercer in 1949
- Born: Jacquelyn Joy Mercer; January 7, 1931; Thatcher, Arizona, US
- Died: February 2, 1982 (aged 51); Los Angeles, California, US
- Title: Miss Arizona 1949; Miss America 1949
- Predecessor: BeBe Shopp
- Successor: Yolande Betbeze
- Spouses: Douglas Cook (m. 1949; div. 1950) William Oldenburger (m. 1952; div. 1952) Dick Curran (m. 1953; div. 1974) Marvin Gillespie (m. 1978–1982)
- Children: 2

Jacquelyn Joy Mercer (January 7, 1931 – February 2, 1982) was Miss America in 1949.

== Biography ==
Mercer was born in Thatcher, Arizona. A granddaughter of the pioneer Linville family who first settled in Arizona in the late 1880s, she won the title of Miss America in 1949. She is mentioned (usually by title, once by name) several times in the 1997 Philip Roth novel, American Pastoral.

She married and divorced her high school sweetheart, Douglas Cook, during her reign as Miss America. After this, a rule was enacted which requires Miss America contestants to sign a pledge vowing they have never been married or pregnant.

While a student at the Arizona State College at Tempe, Mercer acted in a professional stage production of Hay Fever at the Sombrero Playhouse in Phoenix during February 1953, alongside Miriam Hopkins, Wilton Graff, and George Nader.

After divorcing Cook in 1950 Mercer married a casual acquaintance, William Oldenburger, in Los Angeles in August 1952, but divorced 11 days later. In May 1953 she married college and later Green Bay Packer football player Richard Curran in Litchfield Park, Arizona and had two children, Richard Jr. and Sharron Curran. The Currans resided in Phoenix, where Dick Curran founded an advertising agency and Jacque later taught school; they divorced in 1974. In January 1978 she married William Marvin Gillespie in Los Angeles. On February 2, 1982, Mercer died of leukemia in Los Angeles.

Awards and achievements
Preceded by BeBe Shopp	Miss America; 1949	Succeeded by Yolande Betbeze
Preceded by Donna McElroy	Miss Arizona; 1949	Succeeded by Wanda Law
