= Miss Arizona =

Beauty pageant competition

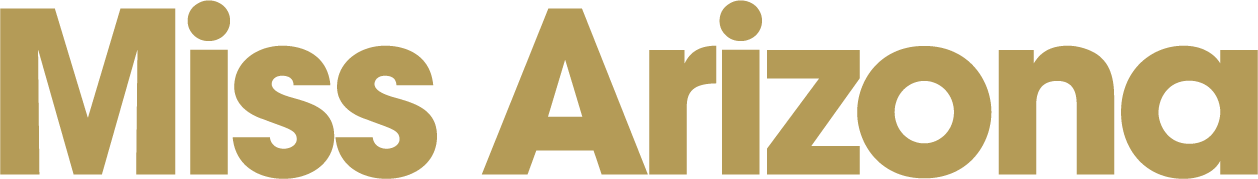
- Type: Beauty pageant
- Headquarters: Chandler
- Location: Arizona
- Members: Miss America
- Official language: English
- Key people: Stacey Kole (Executive Director); Cathy Herd (President)
- Website: Official website

The Miss Arizona competition is the pageant that selects Arizona's representative for the Miss America pageant. Arizona has twice won the Miss America title. The first Miss Arizona, Anna Marie Barnett, was crowned in 1938.

Victoria Vredevoogd of Chandler was crowned Miss Arizona 2026 on June 27, 2026, at the Mesa Arts Center in Mesa, Arizona. She competed for the title of Miss America 2027 on September 6, 2026, at the Kravis Center for the Performing Arts in West Palm Beach, Florida.

== Gallery of past titleholders ==
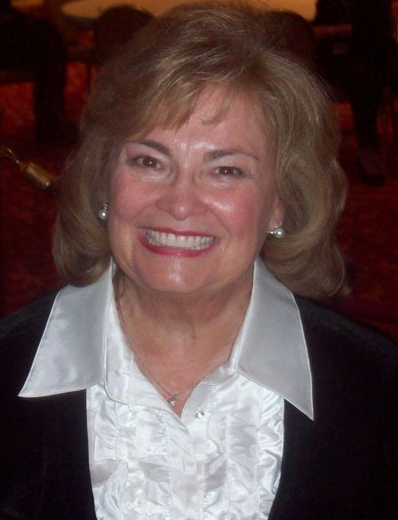
Vonda Kay Van Dyke,
Miss Arizona 1964 and Miss America 1965 in 2008

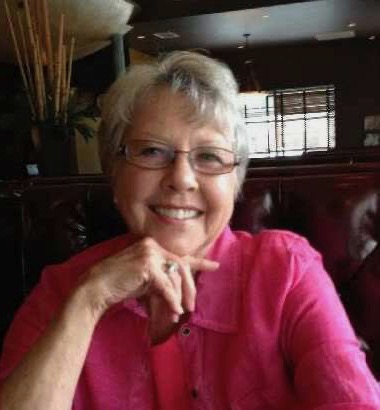
Linda Johnson,
Miss Arizona 1968 in 2016

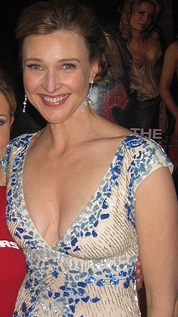
Brenda Strong,
Miss Arizona 1980 in 2006

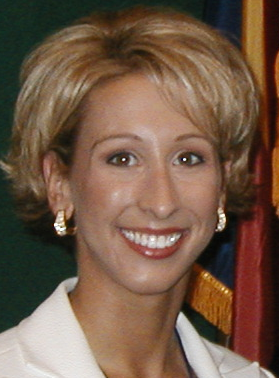
Corrie Hill,
Miss Arizona 2003

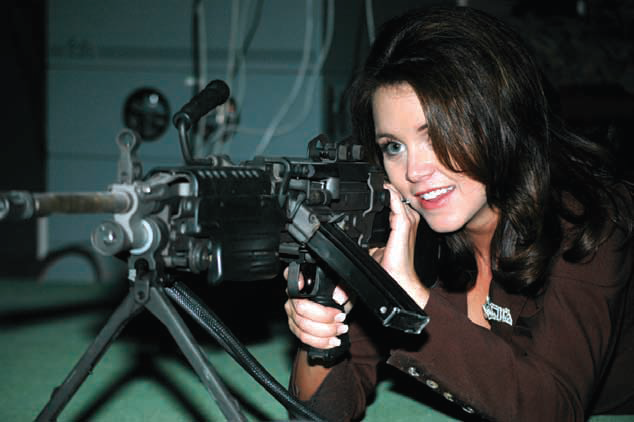
Hilary Griffith,
Miss Arizona 2006

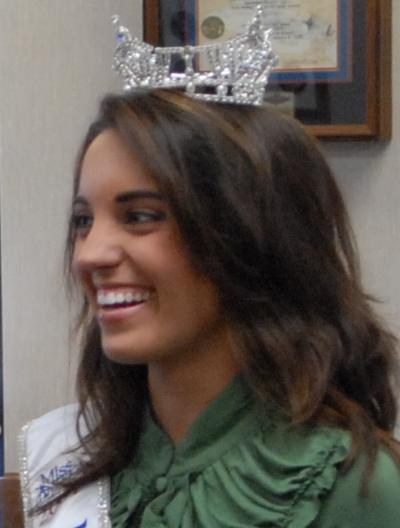
Nicole Turner,
Miss Arizona 2007

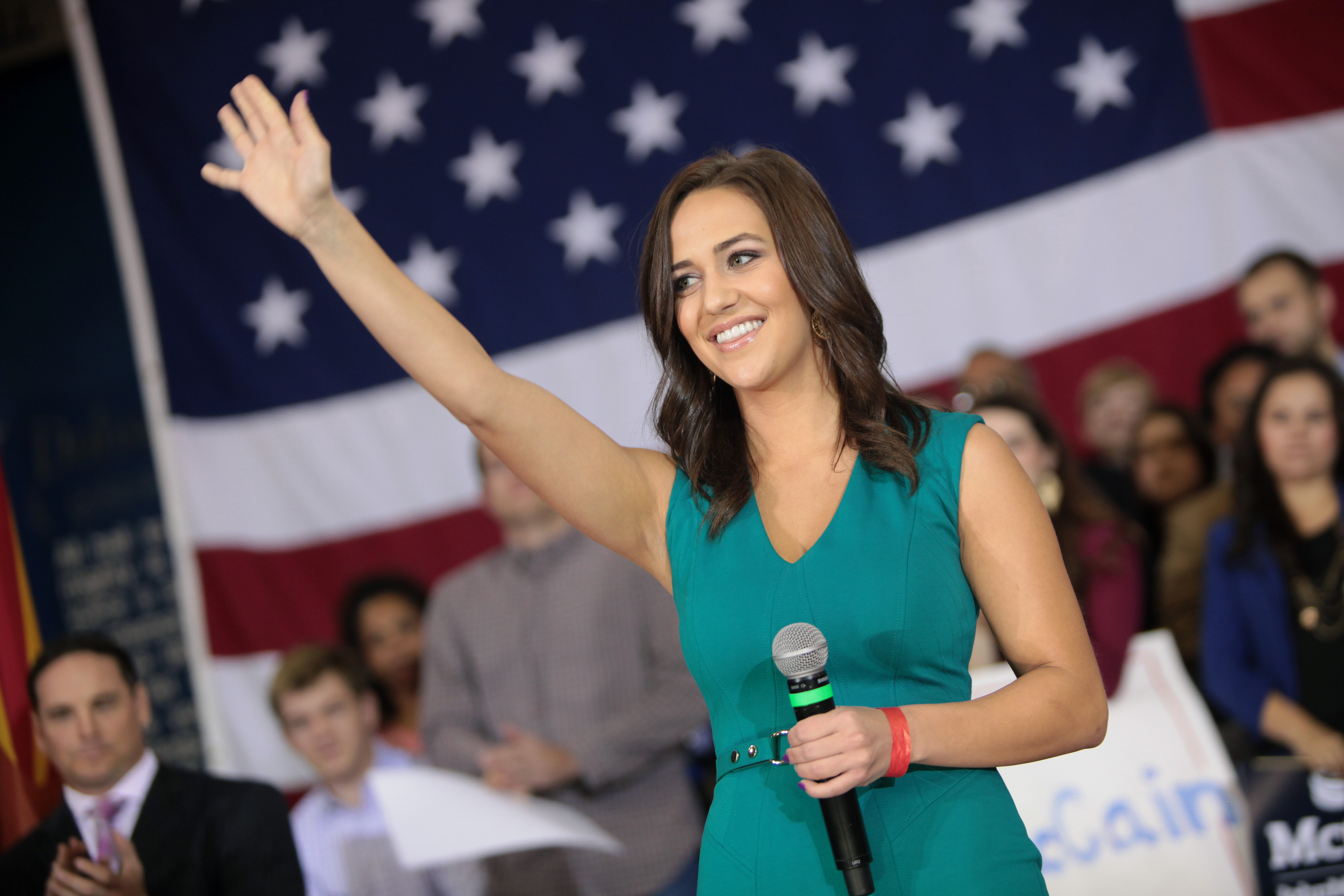
Jennifer Smestad,
Miss Arizona 2013 in 2015

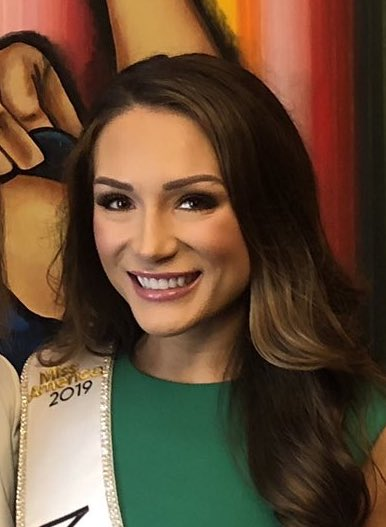
Jacqueline Thomas,
Miss Arizona 2019

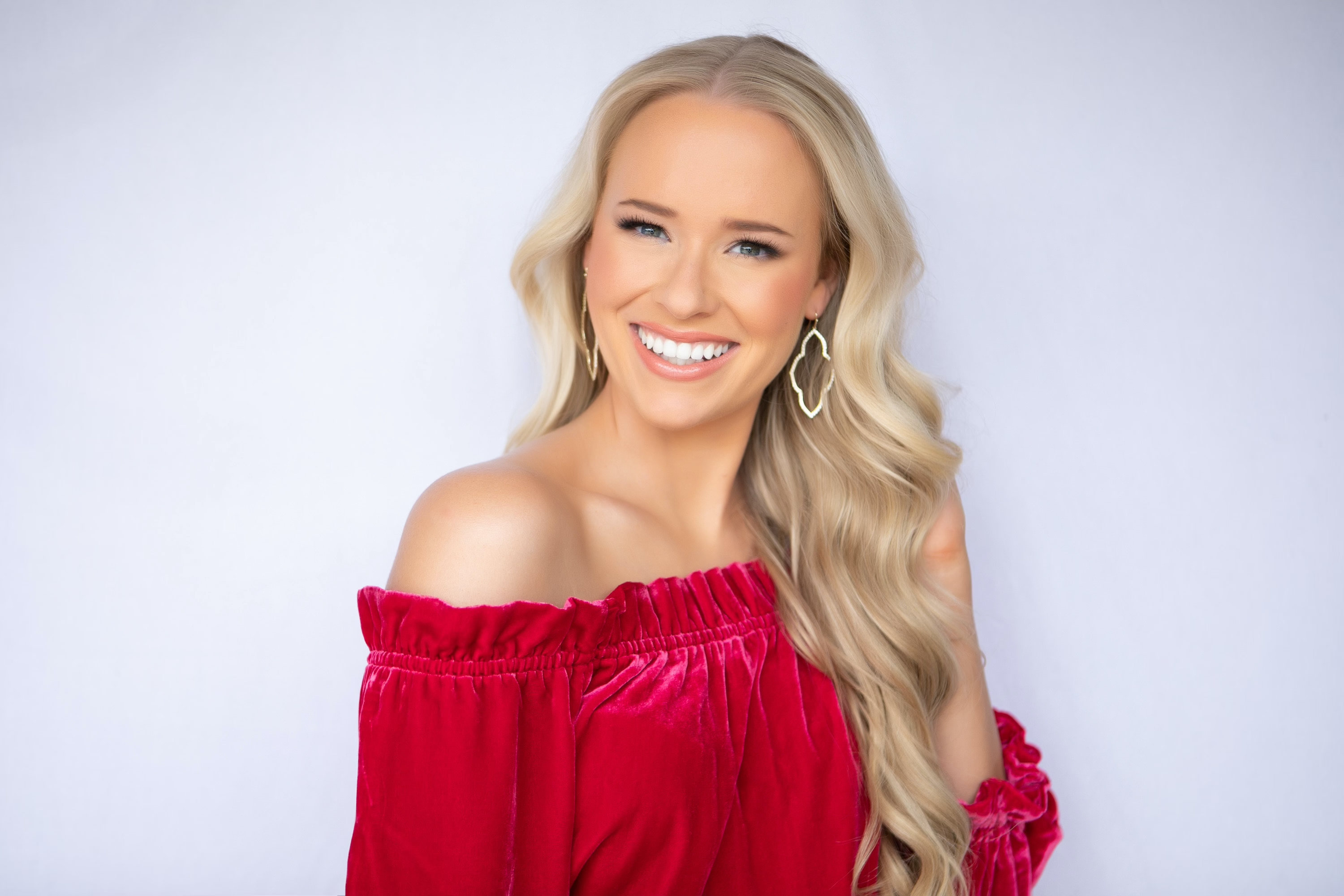
Melody Pierce Miss Arizona 2022

Victoria Vredevoogd, Miss Arizona 2026

== Results summary ==
The following is a visual summary of the past results of Miss Arizona titleholders at the national Miss America pageants/competitions. The year in parentheses indicates the year of the national competition during which a placement and/or award was garnered, not the year attached to the contestant's state title.

=== Placements ===
- Miss Americas: Jacque Mercer (1949), Vonda Kay Van Dyke (1965)
- 3rd runners-up: Barbara Hilgenberg (1957) (tie), Stacey Momeyer (1998), Jennifer Sedler (2012)
- 4th runners-up: Patricia Allebrand (1960), Susan Bergstrom (1964), Stacey Peterson (1976)
- Top 10: Beth Andre (1956), Lynn Freyse (1958), Pam Wenzel (1980), Debra Daniels (1983), Kathryn Bulkley (2011)
- Top 15: Anna Marie Barnett (1938), Wanda Law (1947), Laura Lawless (2003)

=== Awards ===
==== Preliminary Awards ====
- Preliminary Lifestyle & Fitness: Jacque Mercer (1949), Lynn Freyse (1958)
- Preliminary Talent: Jacque Mercer (1949), Pam Wenzel (1980)

==== Non-finalist Awards ====
- Non-finalist Talent: Paula Lou Welch (1963), Linda Gail Sirrine (1973), Sarah Tattersall (1982), Lisa Mandel (1989), Tammy Kettunen (1990), Kimberly Hoskins (1991), Stacy Agren (1995), Erin Gingrich (1997), Erin Nurss (2009), Amber Barto (2021)

==== Other awards ====
- Miss Congeniality: Vonda Kay Van Dyke (1965)
- Quality of Life Award Winners: Amanda Murray (1994), Stacy Agren (1995)
- Quality of Life Award 1st runners-up: Hilary Griffith (2007), Victoria Vredevoogd (2027)
- Quality of Life Award Finalists: Audrey Sibley (2006)
- Special Scholarship: Donna Riggs (1959)
- Women in Business Scholarship Award Finalists: Jacqueline Thomas (2020)
- Women Who Brand Finalists: Melody Pierce (2023)

== Winners ==
- Declared as winner
- Ended as a runner-up
- Ended as a finalist or semi-finalist

| Year | Name | Hometown | Age | Local Title | Miss America Talent | Placement at Miss America | Special scholarships at Miss America | Notes |
|---|---|---|---|---|---|---|---|---|
| 2026 | Victoria Vredevoogd | Chandler | 25 | Miss Chandler | Operetta | | Quality of Life Scholarship $7,500 Award Winner | |
| 2025 | Tiffany Ellington | Scottsdale | 25 | Miss Peoria | Ventriloquism | | | |
| 2024 | Shailey Ringenbach | Maricopa | 20 | Miss Ahwatukee | Lyrical Dance, "If You're Reading This" | | | Older sister of Miss Arizona's Outstanding Teen 2022, Saray Ringenbach |
| 2023 | Tiffany Ticlo | Chandler | 21 | Miss Scottsdale | Vocal | | | Younger sister of Miss Arizona 2018 and Miss Arizona USA 2022, Isabel Ticlo |
| 2022 | Melody Pierce | Phoenix | 26 | Miss North Phoenix | Tap Dance | | Women Who Brand Finalist | |
| 2021 | Amber Barto | Scottsdale | 23 | Miss Scottsdale | Contemporary Dance | | Non-finalist Talent Award | Previously Miss Arizona's Outstanding Teen 2014 |
| 2020 | No national competition due to the COVID-19 pandemic | | | | | | | |
| 2019 | Jacqueline Thomas | Phoenix | 24 | Miss North Phoenix | Piano | | Women in Business Scholarship Finalist | |
| 2018 | Isabel Ticlo | Chandler | 24 | Miss North Phoenix | Bollywood Dance, "JBJ" by Mahalakshmi Iyer | | | Later Arizona Sweetheart 2019 Later 1st runner-up at Miss Arizona USA 2021 Later Miss Arizona USA 2022 Older sister of Miss Arizona 2023, Tiffany Ticlo |
| 2017 | MaddieRose Holler | Surprise | 20 | Miss Peoria | Vocal | | | Previously Miss Arizona's Outstanding Teen 2013 |
| 2016 | Katelyn Niemiec | Scottsdale | 22 | Miss Tempe | Twirl Routine | | | Previously Miss Arizona's Outstanding Teen 2009 |
| 2015 | Madison Esteves | Chandler | 20 | Miss Queen Creek | Jazz Dance, "Ain't Nothin' Wrong With That" by Robert Randolph and the Family Band | | | Previously Miss Arizona's Outstanding Teen 2012 |
| 2014 | Alexa Rogers | Scottsdale | 23 | Miss Phoenix | Contemporary Dance, "Human" | | | |
| 2013 | Jennifer Smestad | Gilbert | 20 | Miss City of Maricopa | Vocal, "Over You" | | | |
| 2012 | Piper Stoeckel | Prescott | 21 | Miss Tucson Valley | Jazz Dance, "Man in the Mirror" | | | |
| 2011 | Jennifer Sedler | Tempe | 19 | Miss Phoenix | Jazz Dance, "It's About That Walk" by Prince | 3rd runner-up | | |
| 2010 | Kathryn Bulkley | Mesa | 20 | Miss Pima County | Classical Vocal, "Nessun dorma" | Top 10 | | Daughter of Miss Hawaii 1981, Pamela Offer Previously Miss Arizona Teen America 2008 |
| 2009 | Savanna Troupe | Phoenix | 23 | Miss Maricopa County | Twirl Routine, "(I Can't Get No) Satisfaction" | | | |
| 2008 | Erin Nurss | Sierra Vista | 23 | Miss Tucson Valley | Dance | | Non-finalist Talent Award | Sister of Miss Arizona's Outstanding Teen 2005, Adrienne Nurss Contestant at National Sweetheart 2007 pageant |
| 2007 | Nicole Turner | Phoenix | 24 | Miss Chandler | Jazz Dance, "Proud Mary" | | | |
| 2006 | Hilary Griffith | Glendale | 20 | Miss Chandler | Vocal, "Don't Know Why" | | Quality of Life Award 1st runner-up | Top 10 at National Sweetheart 2005 pageant |
| 2005 | Audrey Sibley | Sierra Vista | 19 | Miss San Marcos | Vocal, "Alone" | | Quality of Life Award Finalist | |
| 2004 | Katherine Kennedy | Tempe | 24 | Miss Twirling Athlete | Twirl Routine | | | |
| 2003 | Corrie Hill | Gilbert | 24 | Miss Mesa | Dance, "Proud Mary" | | | Contestant at National Sweetheart 2000 pageant Later Mrs. Arizona America 2010 under her married name, Corrie Francis |
| 2002 | Laura Lawless | Tempe | 24 | Miss Maricopa | Classical Piano, "Revolutionary Etude" | Top 15 | | |
| 2001 | Kapri Rose | Gilbert | 19 | Miss Gilbert | Fiddle, "Orange Blossom Special" | | | |
| 2000 | Kristen Vatt | Mesa | 20 | Miss Gilbert | Character Dance, "I, Don Quixote" from Man of La Mancha | | | |
| 1999 | Lori Whiting | Mesa | 20 | Miss Desert Sun | Piano, "Malaguena" | | | |
| 1998 | Leean Hendrix | Parker | 22 | Miss Tempe Buttes | Vocal, "Heaven's What I Feel" | | | |
| 1997 | Stacey Momeyer | Phoenix | 21 | Miss Chandler | Vocal, "Wishing You Were Somehow Here Again" from Phantom of the Opera | 3rd runner-up | | Previously National Sweetheart 1996 |
| 1996 | Erin Gingrich | Yuma | 21 | Miss Yuma County | Piano, "Rhapsody in Blue" | | Non-finalist Talent Award | |
| 1995 | Cara Jackson | Chandler | 22 | Miss Chandler | Vocal, "All Is Fair In Love" | | | Later Miss Arizona USA 1999 |
| 1994 | Stacy Agren | Mesa | 21 | Miss Mesa | Classical Piano | | Non-finalist Talent Award Quality of Life Award Winner | |
| 1993 | Amanda Murray | Yuma | 19 | Miss Yuma County | Vocal, "What Did I Have That I Don't Have" from On a Clear Day You Can See Forever | | Quality of Life Award Winner | |
| 1992 | Robyn Rayborn | Mesa | 26 | Miss Maricopa County | Vocal, "How Great Thou Art" | | | |
| 1991 | Darsi Turner | Yuma | 22 | Miss Tucson | Ballet, "Through the Eyes of Love" from Ice Castles | | | |
| 1990 | Kimberly Hoskins | Yuma | 19 | Miss Yuma County | Ballet en Pointe, "Symphony of the Seas" | | Non-finalist Talent Award | |
| 1989 | Tammy Kettunen | Yuma | 21 | Miss Maricopa County | Freestyle Roller Skating, "Amazing Grace" | | Non-finalist Talent Award | Sister of Miss Arizona 1986, Terri Kettunen |
| 1988 | Lisa Mandel | Tucson | 22 | Miss Tucson | Dance, "Steam Heat" | | Non-finalist Talent Award | |
| 1987 | Theresa Light | Tucson | 18 | Miss Western Maricopa | Vocal, "Somewhere" | | | |
| 1986 | Terri Kettunen | Yuma | 21 | Miss Yuma County | Classical Piano | | | Sister of Miss Arizona 1989, Tammy Kettunen |
| 1985 | Diane Martin | Phoenix | 23 | Miss Phoenix | Vocal, "The Man that Got Away" & "Maybe This Time" from Cabaret | | | Later Miss Arizona USA 1987; 2nd runner-up at Miss USA 1987 pageant |
| 1984 | Rhonda White | Central | 20 | Miss Graham County | Country Vocal Medley | | | |
| 1983 | Jennifer Nichols | Tempe | 22 | Miss Glendale | Classical Vocal, "Glitter and Be Gay" | | | |
| 1982 | Debra Daniels | Yuma | 20 | Miss Yuma County | Free Form Gymnastics, "Chariots of Fire" | Top 10 | | |
| 1981 | Sarah Tattersall | Scottsdale | 20 | Miss Scottsdale | Vocal, "Maybe This Time" & "The Man That Got Away" from Cabaret | | Non-finalist Talent Award | |
| 1980 | Brenda Strong | Tempe | 20 | Miss Valley West | Vocal, "My Man" & "What Did I Have That I Don't Have" | | | Played character and narrator, Mary Alice Young, in the TV series, Desperate Housewives |
| 1979 | Pam Wenzel | Phoenix | 22 | Miss North Central Phoenix | Acrobatic Gymnastic Dance, "Theme from Children of Sanchez" | Top 10 | Preliminary Talent Award | |
| 1978 | Susan Kohler | Tempe | 23 | Miss Arizona State University | Vocal & Dance, "Theme from New York, New York" | | | |
| 1977 | Cindy Glenn | Globe | 18 | Miss Globe | Popular Vocal, "Nothing Can Stop Me Now" | | | |
| 1976 | Anne DeVarennes | Tucson | 22 | Miss Tucson | Vocal, "As Long as He Needs Me" from Oliver! | | | |
| 1975 | Vickie Hall | Sierra Vista | | Miss Sierra Vista | | N/A | | Successor to crown when Peterson resigned |
| 1975 | Stacey Peterson | Phoenix | 21 | Miss Tucson | Ventriloquism, "Yankee Doodle" | 4th runner-up | | |
| 1974 | Mary Avilla | Glendale | 20 | Miss Maryvale | Popular Vocal, "Best Thing You've Ever Done" | | | |
| 1973 | Susan May | Kingman | 19 | Miss Coconino County | Piano Medley, "The Glory of Love," "Laura," & "On the Sunny Side of the Street" | | | |
| 1972 | Linda Gail Sirrine | Mesa | 19 | Miss Mesa | Popular Vocal, "Happy Heart" | | Non-finalist Talent Award | |
| 1971 | Celia Sklan | Scottsdale | 22 | Miss Scottsdale | Dramatic Skit & Song, "English Pub" | | | |
| 1970 | Karen Joy Shields | Tucson | 19 | Miss University of Arizona | Dance and Vocal Medley from My Fair Lady | | | |
| 1969 | Kathleen Ennis | Tucson | 20 | Miss Tucson | Original Comedy Monologue, "Interview with Cleopatra, Shirley Temple, and Tiny Tim" | | | |
| 1968 | Linda Johnson | Warren | 20 | Miss Cochise County | Authentic Tahitian Dance | | | Previously Arizona's Junior Miss 1966 |
| 1967 | Bea Willis | Phoenix | 19 | Miss Phoenix | Vocal, "Wouldn't It Be Loverly" from My Fair Lady | | | |
| 1966 | Launa Gardner | Holbrook | 19 | Miss Holbrook | Piano | | | |
| 1965 | Sandra Montgomery | Yuma | 18 | Miss Yuma County | Vocal, "Once In a Lifetime" & "I Love Being Here With You" | | | |
| 1964 | Vonda Kay Van Dyke | Phoenix | 22 | Miss Phoenix | Ventriloquism, "Together (Wherever We Go)" | Winner | Miss Congeniality | Semi-finalist at America's Junior Miss 1961 pageant Only Miss America winner to also be named Miss Congeniality |
| 1963 | Susan Bergstrom | Phoenix | | Miss Phoenix | Modern Jazz Dance, "Tonight" | 4th runner-up | | |
| 1962 | Paula Lou Welch | Tucson | 20 | Miss Tucson | Fire Baton Twirling | | Non-finalist Talent Award | |
| 1961 | Susan Webb | Prescott | 19 | Miss Prescott | Original Dramatic Composition, "My Heritage: The Stars" | | | |
| 1960 | Georgia Ann Garbarino | Flagstaff | 18 | Miss Flagstaff | Modern Dance Impression, An American in Paris | | | |
| 1959 | Patricia Allebrand | Yuma | 18 | Miss Yuma County | Modern Dance, "Interpretation of Rejected Love" | 4th runner-up | | |
| 1958 | Donna Riggs | Phoenix | | Miss Phoenix | Vocal / Dance, "Teacher's Pet" | | Special Scholarship Award | |
| 1957 | Lynn Freyse | Tucson | | Miss Tucson | Dramatic Reading from The Country Girl | Top 10 | Preliminary Swimsuit Award | Later starred in TV series Hazel |
| 1956 | Barbara Hilgenberg | Tucson | | Miss Tucson | Monologue, "End and the Beginning" by John Mansfield | 3rd runner-up (tie) | | |
| 1955 | Beth Andre | Phoenix | | Miss Maricopa County | Comic Monologue, "What Do I Do Now, Mr. McLeod?" | Top 10 | | |
| 1954 | Marjorie Nylund | Phoenix | | Miss Phoenix | Dramatic Reading, "A Marine's Conversation" | | | |
| 1953 | Betty Lou Lindly | Tempe | | Miss Tempe | Piano | | | |
| 1952 | No Arizona representative at Miss America pageant | | | | | | | |
| 1951 | No Arizona representative at Miss America pageant | | | | | | | |
| 1950 | Kathryn Lunsford | Phoenix | | Miss Phoenix | Modern Dance | | | |
| 1949 | Jacque Mercer | Litchfield | 18 | Miss Litchfield | Dramatic Reading from Romeo and Juliet | Winner | Preliminary Lifestyle and Fitness Award; Preliminary Talent Award | |
| 1948 | Donna McElroy | Phoenix | | Miss Phoenix | Dramatic Monologue | | | |
| 1947 | Wanda Law | Tempe | | Miss Tempe | | Top 15 | | |
| 1946 | No Arizona representative at Miss America pageant | | | | | | | |
| 1945 | No Arizona representative at Miss America pageant | | | | | | | |
| 1944 | No Arizona representative at Miss America pageant | | | | | | | |
| 1943 | No Arizona representative at Miss America pageant | | | | | | | |
| 1942 | No Arizona representative at Miss America pageant | | | | | | | |
| 1941 | No Arizona representative at Miss America pageant | | | | | | | |
| 1940 | Anna Marie Barnett | | | | | | | |
| 1939 | No Arizona representative at Miss America pageant | | | | | | | |
| 1938 | Anna Marie Barnett | Bisbee | | Miss Bisbee | | Top 15 | | |
| 1934 | No national pageant was held | | | | | | | |
| 1933 | No Arizona representative at Miss America pageant | | | | | | | |
| 1932 | No national pageants were held | | | | | | | |
| 1931 | No national pageants were held | | | | | | | |
| 1930 | No national pageants were held | | | | | | | |
| 1929 | No national pageants were held | | | | | | | |
| 1928 | No national pageants were held | | | | | | | |
| 1927 | No Arizona representative at Miss America pageant | | | | | | | |
| 1926 | No Arizona representative at Miss America pageant | | | | | | | |
| 1925 | No Arizona representative at Miss America pageant | | | | | | | |
| 1924 | No Arizona representative at Miss America pageant | | | | | | | |
| 1923 | No Arizona representative at Miss America pageant | | | | | | | |
| 1922 | No Arizona representative at Miss America pageant | | | | | | | |
| 1921 | No Arizona representative at Miss America pageant | | | | | | | |
