= Miss Arizona's Teen =

Pageant

- Formation: 2005
- Type: Beauty pageant
- Headquarters: Chandler
- Location: Arizona
- Members: Miss America's Teen
- Official language: English
- Key people: Stacey Kole (Executive Director)
- Website: Official website

The Miss Arizona's Teen competition is the pageant that selects the representative for the U.S. state of Arizona in the Miss America's Teen pageant.

Ellie Duffin of Gilbert was crowned Miss Arizona's Teen on June 27, 2026, at the Mesa Arts Center in Mesa, Arizona. She competed for the title of Miss America's Teen 2027 on September 5, 2026, at the Kravis Center for the Performing Arts in West Palm Beach, Florida.

In January 2023, the official name of the pageant was changed from Miss Arizona's Outstanding Teen, to Miss Arizona's Teen, in accordance with the national pageant.

== Results summary ==
The year in parentheses indicates the year of the Miss America's Teen competition the award/placement was garnered.

=== Placements ===
- 1st runner-up: Katelyn Cai (2020)
- 3rd runners-up: Jessi Gradillas (2016)
- Top 10: Adrienne Nurss (2006)
- Top 11: Saray Ringenbach (2023)

=== Awards ===
==== Preliminary awards ====
- Preliminary Evening Wear/On Stage Question: Jessi Gradillas (2016), Katelyn Cai (2020)
- Preliminary Talent: Jessi Gradillas (2016)

==== Other awards ====
- Outstanding Achievement in Academic Life: Katelyn Cai (2020)
- Top 5 Interview: Katelyn Cai (2020)
- Teens in Action Award Winners: Kate Lynn Blair (2022)
- Teens in Action Award Finalists: Ashlyn Thompson (2019)

== Winners ==
- Declared as Winner
- Ended as runner-up
- Ended as a finalist or semi-finalist

| Year | Name | Hometown | Age | Local Title | Talent | Placement at MAO Teen | Special scholarships at MAO Teen | Notes |
|---|---|---|---|---|---|---|---|---|
| 2026 | Ellie Duffin | Gilbert | 17 | Miss Peoria's Teen | Dance | | | Previously International Cinderella Teen 2024-2025; Previously International Cinderella Miss 2022-2023; Previously International Cinderella Mini Miss 2019-2020 |
| 2025 | Sydney Thomas | Gilbert | 18 | Miss Chandler's Teen | Vocal | | | |
| 2024 | Vianah Bradt | Maricopa | 17 | Miss Maricopa County's Teen | Lyrical Dance | | | |
| 2023 | Alexis Miranda | Buckeye | 18 | Miss North Phoenix's Teen | Lyrical Dance | | | |
| 2022 | Saray Ringenbach | Maricopa | 14 | Miss Tempe's Outstanding Teen | Dance | Top 11 | | Youngest winner to be crowned Miss Arizona’s Outstanding Teen; Younger sister of Miss Arizona 2024, Shailey Ringenbach |
| 2021 | Kate Lynn Blair | Phoenix | 16 | Miss Maricopa County's Outstanding Teen | Lyrical Dance, "Something in the Water" | | Teens in Action Award Winner | |
| 2019–20 | Katelyn Cai | Scottsdale | 15 | Miss North Phoenix's Outstanding Teen | Lyrical Dance, "You Say" | 1st runner-up | Outstanding Achievement in Academic Life Preliminary Evening Wear/OSQ Award Top 5 Interview | First Chinese-American crowned Miss Arizona's Outstanding Teen Later Distinguished Young Woman of America for 2022 |
| 2018 | Ashlyn Thompson | Mesa | 17 | Miss North Phoenix's Outstanding Teen | Clogging, "I Wanna Dance with Somebody" | | Teens in Action Award Finalist | |
| 2017 | Dimon Sanders | Glendale | 17 | Miss Glendale's Outstanding Teen | Dance | | | First African American to be crowned Miss Arizona's Outstanding Teen |
| 2016 | Elan Morris | Chandler | 17 | Miss Surprise's Outstanding Teen | Dance | | | |
| 2015 | Jessi Gradillas | Chandler | 17 | Miss Grand Canyon's Outstanding Teen | Vocal/Guitar | 3rd runner-up | | |
| 2014 | Amber Barto | Ahwatukee | 16 | Miss City of Maricopa's Outstanding Teen | Jazz Dance | | | Later Miss Arizona 2021 |
| 2013 | MaddieRose Holler | Surprise | 15 | Miss Surprise's Outstanding Teen | Vocal | | | Later Miss Arizona 2017 |
| 2012 | Madison Esteves | Chandler | 17 | Miss Maricopa County's Outstanding Teen | Dance | | | Later Miss Arizona 2015 |
| 2011 | Marissa Mezzatesta | Scottsdale | 17 | At-Large | Dance | | | 4th runner-up at Miss Arizona 2019 competition |
| 2010 | Elizabeth Stolper | Glendale | 16 | Miss Phoenix's Outstanding Teen | Dance | | | |
| 2009 | Katelyn Niemiec | Scottsdale | 15 | Miss Teen Twirling Athlete | Twirling routine | | | Contestant at National Sweetheart 2013 pageant Later Miss Arizona 2016 |
| 2008 | Kelsey Hartley | Cave Creek | 16 | Miss Teen Twirling Athlete | Baton Twirl | | | |
| 2007 | Danielle Dastrup | Holbrook | 16 | Miss Teen Navajo County | Vocal | | | |
| 2006 | Brittany Mazur | Tucson | 16 | At-Large | Vocal | | | Contestant on season 10 of American Idol Top 5 at National Sweetheart 2012 pageant |
| 2005 | Adrienne Nurss | Sierra Vista | 17 | At-Large | Dance | Top 10 | | Sister of Erin Nurss, Miss Arizona 2008 |
