= Laura Lawless =

American model (born 1978)

- Born: Laura Lawless; 1978 (age 47–48); New York City, U.S.
- Other name: Laura Robertson
- Beauty pageant titleholder
- Title: New York's Junior Miss 1996, Miss Arizona 2002
- Major competition: America's Junior Miss 1996, Miss America 2003 (Top 15)

Laura Lawless Robertson (born 1978) held the title of Miss Arizona 2002 and placed in the Top 15 Semifinals at the Miss America 2003 Pageant held on September 21, 2002, in Atlantic City, New Jersey.

== Miss Arizona ==
Lawless competed at Miss Arizona as Miss Maricopa and had previously held the title of New York's Junior Miss 1996. She has also competed in the Miss Massachusetts and Miss New York pageants prior to moving to Arizona to attend law school. Her talent was classical piano. Her personal platform was Mental Health Matters: Encouraging Awareness, Advocacy, and Action, since she had been diagnosed with clinical depression at the age of 17.

== Life after Miss Arizona ==
Lawless is currently a celebrity spokesperson for the National Alliance on Mental Illness and the National Alliance for Research on Schizophrenia and Depression (now known as the Brain & Behavior Research Foundation). She also currently speaks about mental illness, traveling all around the country. She attended high school at Dominican Academy in Manhattan, NY. She is a graduate of Harvard University (2000) and Arizona State University College of Law (2005). She is currently a partner attorney working at Squire Patton Boggs in Phoenix, focusing on labor and employment issues and on general litigation matters.

Awards and achievements
Preceded by Kapri Rose	Miss Arizona; 2003	Succeeded by Corrie Hill
