= Blaire Pancake =

American beauty pageant titleholder

- Education: University of Tennessee
- Beauty pageant titleholder
- Title: Miss Tennessee
- Hair color: Blonde
- Major competition: Miss America 2007

Blaire Pancake is an American beauty pageant titleholder who was named Miss Tennessee 2006.

== Biography ==
Pancake competed and won several beauty pageants as a child. She is the sister of professional golfer Brooke Pancake. In 2010, she married Wade Koehl, a former University of Houston star football player.

Awards and achievements
Preceded by Tara Burns	Miss Tennessee; 2006	Succeeded by Grace Gore
