= Miss America 1977 =

US beauty pageant

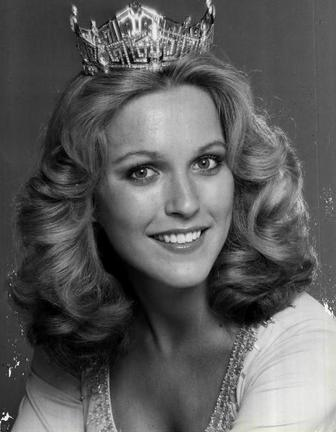
- Dorothy Benham, 1977 CBS publicity photo
- Date: September 11, 1976
- Presenters: Bert Parks
- Venue: Boardwalk Hall, Atlantic City, New Jersey
- Broadcaster: NBC
- Winner: Dorothy Benham; Minnesota

Miss America 1977, the 50th Miss America pageant, was held at the Boardwalk Hall in Atlantic City, New Jersey on September 11, 1976, on NBC Network. The winner was Miss Minnesota, Dorothy Benham.

Before the finals, Benham and second runner up Carmen McCollum shared victories of the talent and swimsuit preliminary trophies. Deborah Lipford, Miss Delaware, was the first black contestant to make it to the final 10, and only the sixth to win a state level Miss America contest.

Benham became a singer, appearing often on the Crystal Cathedral religious-themed program Hour of Power.

Among the other contestants in 1977 was Miss Florida, actress Nancy Stafford, who would co-star with Andy Griffith 11 years later in the NBC TV series Matlock.

== Results ==
Final results	Contestant
Miss America 1977	Minnesota - Dorothy Benham
1st runner-up	South Carolina - Lavinia Cox
2nd runner-up	Texas - Carmen McCollum
3rd runner-up	California - Linda Michelle Mouron
4th runner-up	(New York (state)) New York - Sonja Anderson
Top 10	Delaware - Deborah Lipford; Maryland - Barbara Jennings; North Dakota - Donna Grotberg; Pennsylvania - Marie McLaughlin; Virginia - Pamela Polk

=== Awards ===
==== Preliminary awards ====
Awards	Contestant
Lifestyle and Fitness	Minnesota - Dorothy Benham; South Carolina - Lavinia Cox; Texas - Carmen McCollum
Talent	Minnesota - Dorothy Benham; (New York (state)) New York - Sonja Anderson (tie); Texas - Carmen McCollum (tie); Virginia - Pamela Polk

==== Non-finalist awards ====
Awards	Contestant
Talent	Alaska - Kathy Tebow; Arkansas - Joyce McCormack; Idaho - RaNae Petersen; Kentucky - Victoria Harned; Nevada - Sandra Kastel; Ohio - Janice Cooley; Oregon - Shan Moss; Wyoming - Carol June Wallace

== Judges ==
- Gail Brown
- Katherine C. Corbett
- Frank DeFord
- Don Galloway
- Robert Lewine
- Jeanne Meixell
- Petr Spurney
- Susan Starr

== Contestants ==
State	Name	Hometown	Age	Talent	Placement	Special Awards	Notes
Alabama	Denise Davis	Russellville	18	Popular Vocal			Toured with Miss America USO Troupe
Alaska	Kathy Tebow	Anchorage	19	Violin Solo, "Méditation"		Non-finalist Talent Award	
Arizona	Anne DeVarennes	Tucson	22	Vocal, "As Long as He Needs Me" from Oliver!			
Arkansas	Joyce McCormack	Little Rock	21	Ballet en Pointe, "Polonaise"		Non-finalist Talent Award	
California	Linda Mouron	Orange	19	Tap Dance, "Puttin' on the Ritz"	3rd runner-up		
Colorado	Karen Land	Littleton	22	Vibraphone, "Bandstand Boogie"			
Connecticut	Debra LaRoche	Cheshire	20	Popular Vocal, "I Feel a Song Coming On"			
Delaware	Deborah Rica Lipford	Newark	21	Dramatic Interpretation, "It Was a Good Time" from Ryan's Daughter	Top 10		First African-American contestant to reach the top 10 at Miss America
Florida	Nancy Stafford	Fort Lauderdale	22	Piano, "Send in the Clowns"			
(Georgia (U.S. state)) Georgia	Sandy Adamson	Atlanta	20	Tap Dance, "I Can Do That"		Dr. David B. Allman Medical Scholarship	
Hawaii	Haunani Asing	Kailua	18	Guitar &Vocal, "Hawaiian Lullaby"			
Idaho	RaNae Peterson	Preston	19	Organ Medley, "I Got Rhythm" & "I'd Like to Teach the World to Sing"		Non-finalist Talent Award	
Illinois	Betsy Jamison	Mundelein	24	Popular Vocal, "Who Will Buy?" from Oliver!			
Indiana	Tamara Trittschuh	Plainfield	21	Piano, "Rhapsodies, Op. 79" by Johannes Brahms			
Iowa	Ronda Frogley	Davenport	20	Popular Vocal, "Tomorrow"			
Kansas	Linda Hall	Hill City	21	Piano, Theme from The Apartment			Wife of former U.S. Senator Tom Daschle
Kentucky	Victoria Harned	Leitchfield	21	Popular Vocal, "Send in the Clowns"		Non-finalist Talent Award	
Louisiana	Candy Sue Crocker	Hammond	22	Vocal/Tap Dance, "Swanee"			
Maine	Susan Wanbaugh	Presque Isle	19	Dramatic Monologue from As You Like It			
Maryland	Barbara Jean Jennings	Greenbelt	25	Piano, "Morceaux de fantaisie" by Rachmaninoff	Top 10	Dr. David B. Allman Medical Scholarship	
Massachusetts	Deborah Guastella	Methuen	22	Vocal, "Your World and Mine"			
Michigan	Diane Kay Hansen	Berrien Center	23	Piano Medley, "My Country, 'Tis of Thee", "Dixie", & "Yankee Doodle"			
Minnesota	Dorothy Benham	Edina	20	Classical Vocal, "Adele's Laughing Song" from Die Fledermaus	Winner	Preliminary Lifestyle & Fitness Award Preliminary Talent Award	
Mississippi	Bobbye Wood	Hattiesburg	19	Vocal, "Starting Here, Starting Now"			
Missouri	Marcia Kolich	Sugar Creek	22	Jazz Dance, "Everything's Coming up Roses", "On Broadway", & "That's Entertainment!"			
Montana	Janice Frankino	Helena	19	Gymnastics/Jazz Dance, "The Yankee Doodle Boy"		Dr. David B. Allman Medical Scholarship	
Nebraska	Marion Catherine Watson	Omaha	22	Vocal, "Over the Rainbow"			
Nevada	Sandra Kastel	Las Vegas	21	Vocal, "My Man"		Non-finalist Talent Award	
New Hampshire	Margaret Spellacy	Hampton	21	Comedy Dance, "The Yankee Doodle Boy"			
New Jersey	Lori Johnson	Medford	19	Acrobatic Dance, "Love is the Answer"			
New Mexico	Melody Griffin	Hobbs	21	Vocal, "The Music and the Mirror" from A Chorus Line			
(New York (state)) New York	Sonja Anderson	New York City	25	Vocal, "And This is My Beloved"	4th runner-up	Preliminary Talent Award	Previously Miss New York USA 1975
North Carolina	Susie Proffitt	Black Mountain	22	Tap Dance from Baby Face			
North Dakota	Donna Grotberg	Valley City	18	Piano, "The Cat and the Mouse"	Top 10		
Ohio	Janice Cooley	Portsmouth	20	Piano, "Mephisto Waltz"		Non-finalist Talent Award	
Oklahoma	Lucia Miller	Buffalo	21	Trumpet, "Won't You Come Home Bill Bailey"			
Oregon	Shan Moss	Nyssa	21	Flute, "Concertino"		Non-finalist Talent Award	
Pennsylvania	Marie McLaughlin	Levittown	23	Ventriloquism, "Together (Wherever We Go)"	Top 10		
Rhode Island	Debra Cerroni	Esmond	20	Vocal, "Much More" from The Fantasticks			Previously Miss Rhode Island USA 1974
South Carolina	Lavinia Cox	Latta	23	Piano Medley, "The Man I Love" & "Sunny"	1st runner-up	Preliminary Lifestyle & Fitness Award	
South Dakota	Beth Guthmiller	Tripp	21	Vocal, "My Tribute"			Younger sister of Miss South Dakota 1974, Barbara Guthmiller
Tennessee	Terry Alden	Memphis	21	Classical Piano, "Toccata"			
Texas	Carmen McCollum	Odessa	19	Saxophone Medley, "Wabash Cannonball", "Yakety Sax", & "If He Walked Into My Life" from Mame	2nd runner-up	Preliminary Lifestyle & Fitness Award Preliminary Talent Award	
Utah	Suzanne McKay	Salt Lake City	22	Organ Medley, "Yankee Doodle Dandy" & "God Bless America"			
Vermont	Suzanne Wind	Saxtons River	18	Acrobatic Jazz Dance, "Wisdom"			
Virginia	Pamela Polk	Richmond	22	Classical Vocal, "Mi Chiamano Mimi" from La bohème	Top 10	Preliminary Talent Award	
(Washington (state)) Washington	Theresa Adams	Wenatchee	19	Classical Piano, "Prelude in G minor" by Rachmaninoff			
West Virginia	Teresa Lucas	Elkins	22	Gymnastics Routine			
Wisconsin	Julie Nowak	Greendale	19	Popular Vocal, "Do You Know Where You're Going To?"			
Wyoming	Carol June Wallace	Jackson	24	Piano Medley, "Love is a Many-Splendored Thing", "Love Story", "Raindrops Keep Fallin' on My Head", & "Strangers in the Night"		Non-finalist Talent Award	Previously Miss Kentucky USA 1975 Semi-finalist at Miss USA 1975 Mother of Miss Kentucky 2002, Mary Catherine Correll
