= Miss Tennessee =

Beauty pageant competition

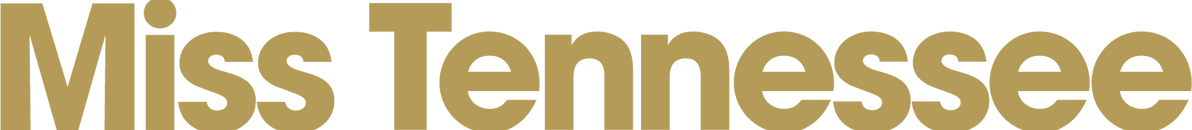
- Formation: 1922
- Type: Beauty pageant
- Headquarters: Nashville
- Location: Tennessee
- Members: Miss America
- Official language: English
- Website: Official website

The Miss Tennessee competition is the pageant that selects the representative for the state of Tennessee in the Miss America Scholarship Competition.

Makalyn Heaslett of Nashville was crowned Miss Tennessee on June 20, 2026, at the Fisher Center for the Performing Arts at Belmont University in Nashville, Tennessee. She will compete for the title of Miss America 2027.

== History ==
The Miss Tennessee pageant was first held in 1938, although the winner, Isobel Carter, was unable to compete at Miss America due to illness and so the 1st runner-up became Miss Tennessee. The following year, two winners were chosen to compete for the Miss America title. In 1940 the pageant suffered a repeat of 1938, with the winner resigning through illness and the 1st runner-up representing the state at the national competition. The routine pageant was held in 1941, but from 1942 to 1946 representatives were appointed without a pageant being held, due to World War II. In 1947 twins Jean and Jane Cunningham were both awarded Tennessee titles, with one representing Tennessee and one Chattanooga at the Miss America pageant. The modern era of the pageant can be dated to 1953, when a regular routine of state pageants was instituted.

Barbara Jo Walker was crowned Miss America 1947 and represented the city of Memphis when she won the title. Kellye Cash, Miss America 1987, was the second woman from Tennessee to win the national title. All three Miss Tennessees from 1999 to 2001 later won the similar Miss Tennessee USA pageant, whose delegates represent Tennessee at the Miss USA pageant. Three other Miss Tennessees have won the Miss Tennessee USA title, Jean Harper, Desiree Daniels, and Leah Hulan. Two Miss Tennessees have won the National Sweetheart title, Rita Wilson and Vicki Hurd.

In the fall of 2018, the Miss America Organization terminated the former Miss Tennessee organization's license as well as licenses from Florida, Georgia, New Jersey, New York, Pennsylvania, and West Virginia. On December 22, 2018, Miss America Awarded a new license for Tennessee naming Joe Albright as CEO; Lanna Keck-Smith, Miss Tennessee 1997, as executive director; and Caty Davis, Miss Tennessee 2017, as the Chief People Officer.

== Gallery of Winners ==
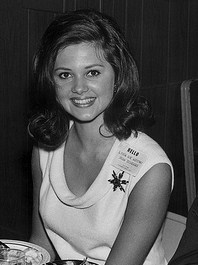
Linda Workman,
Miss Tennessee 1967

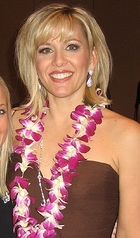
Kellye Cash,
Miss Tennessee 1986 and Miss America 1987

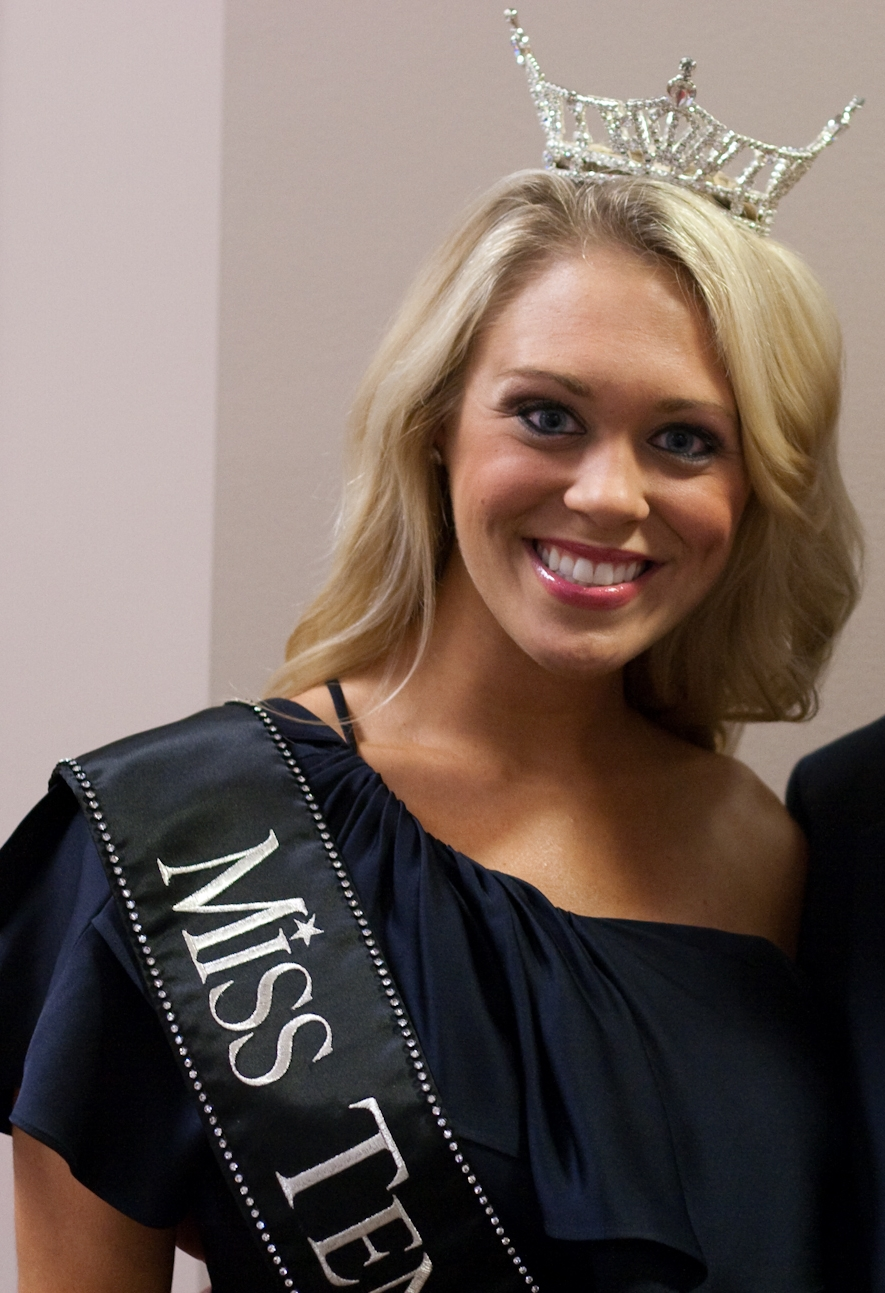
Stefanie Wittler,
Miss Tennessee 2009

== Results summary ==
The following is a visual summary of the past results of Miss Tennessee titleholders at the national Miss America pageants/competitions. The year in parentheses indicates the year of the national competition during which a placement and/or award was garnered, not the year attached to the contestant's state title.

=== Placements ===
- Miss Americas: Barbara Jo Walker (Miss Memphis) (1947), Kellye Cash (1987)
- 1st runners-up: Desiree Daniels (1983)
- 2nd runners-up: Vicki Hurd (1967), Dana Brown (1991), Stephanie Culberson (2002), Stefanie Wittler (2010), Carley Jaymes Vogel (2025)
- 3rd runners-up: Martha Truett (1964)
- Top 7: Ellen Carrington (2009), Hannah Robison (2016)
- Top 10: Gerry Johnson (1955), Marion "Mickey" Wayland (1960), Brenda Seal (1969), Deborah Kincaid (1975), Linda Moore (1978), Shelly Mangrum (1985), Erin Hatley (2012), Chandler Lawson (2013), Hayley Lewis (2015), Grace Burgess (2017)
- Top 11: Zoe Schielderich (2026)
- Top 12: Caty Davis (2018)
- Top 13: Lee Henson (1945)
- Top 15: Georgia Cunningham (1947), Lois Jeanette Welch (1948), Jean Harper (1952)
- Top 16: Grace Gore (2008)

=== Awards ===
==== Preliminary awards ====
- Preliminary Evening Gown: Stephanie Culberson (2002)
- Preliminary Lifestyle and Fitness: Lee Henson (1945), Linda Moore (1978), Desiree Daniels (1983), Kellye Cash (1987), Stephanie Culberson (2002), Brandee Mills (2024), Zoe Scheiderich (2026)
- Preliminary Talent: Barbara Jo Walker (Miss Memphis) (1947), Dorothy Free (1948), Deborah Kincaid (1975), Kellye Cash (1987), Grace Burgess (2017) Carly Jaymes Vogel (2025)

==== Non-finalist awards ====
- Non-finalist Interview: Alison Shumate (1996)
- Non-finalist Talent: Mary Cox (1970), Elise Neal (1980), Moira Kaye (1984), Carrie Folks (1989), Beth Hood (2001), Ashley Eicher (2005), Tara Burns (2006)

==== Other awards ====
- Miss Congeniality: N/A
- America's Choice: Hannah Robison (2016)
- Intercity Beauty Award Second Prize: Sue Burton (1922)
- Evening Dress Award: Elizabeth Mallory (1923)
- Equity & Justice Scholarship Award Finalists: Brianna Mason (2020)
- Forever Miss America Scholarship: Tally Bevis (2022)
- Quality of Life Award 1st runners-up: Hannah Robison (2016)
- Quality of Life Award 2nd runners-up: Chandler Lawson (2013)
- Quality of Life Award Finalists: Heather Heath (1999), Grace Gore (2008) Stefanie Wittler (2010), Grace Burgess (2017), Christine Williamson (2019), Makalyn Heaslett (2027)
- Roller Chair Parade Second Prize: Elizabeth Mallory (1923)
- STEM Scholarship Award Winners: Hannah Robison (2016)
- Top Fundraiser 3rd runner-up: Tally Bevis (2022)
- Waterford Scholarship for Business in Marketing and Management: Allison Alderson (2000)
- Women in Business 2nd runner-up: Tally Bevis (2022)
- Women in Business Scholarship Award Finalists: Christine Williamson (2019)

== Winners ==
- Declared as winner
- Ended as a runner-up
- Ended as a finalist or semi-finalist

| Year | Name | Hometown | Age | Local Title | Miss America Talent | Placement at Miss America | Special scholarships at Miss America | Notes |
|---|---|---|---|---|---|---|---|---|
| 2026 | Makalyn Heaslett | Nashville | 27 | Miss Nashville | Tap Dance | | Quality of Life Award Finalist | |
| 2025 | Zoe Scheiderich | Nashville | 22 | Miss Music City | Dance | Top 11 | Preliminary Fitness Award | |
| 2024 | Carley Jaymes Vogel | Murfreesboro / Kennesaw, Georgia | 24 | Miss Music City | Classical Vocal, "Climb Every Mountain" | 2nd Runner-up | Preliminary Talent Award | Daughter of Miss Georgia USA 1985, Amanda Smith Vogel |
| 2023 | Brandee Mills | Nashville | 25 | Miss Middle Tennessee | Dance | | Preliminary Lifestyle & Fitness Award | |
| 2022 | Lauren Dickson | Parsons | 24 | Miss Lexington | Vocal | | | |
| 2021 | Tally Bevis | Springfield | 24 | Miss Nashville | Vocal, Here You Come Again by Dolly Parton, Piano Accompaniment. | | Forever Miss America Scholarship Top Fundraiser 4th Place Women in Business 2nd runner-up | |
| 2019–20 (Note: Titleholder extended to a second full year in 2020 after state and national pageants postponed to 2021 due to the COVID-19 pandemic) | Brianna Mason | Nashville | 23 | Miss Greene County | Piano, "Piano Fantasy" by William Joseph | | Equity & Justice Scholarship Award Finalist | First African-American to win Miss Tennessee |
| 2018 | Christine Electra Williamson | Chattanooga | 22 | Miss Chattanooga | Vocal, "Never Enough" from The Greatest Showman | | Quality of Life Award Finalist Women in Business Scholarship Finalist*The First Miss TN to be named a finalist for this award *Only contestant to be named a finalist for 2 Awards at the Miss America National Competition | Cut ties with Miss America Organization but did not formally resign on May 10, 2019. Williamson's statement she released included claiming adverse circumstances, "blatant disregard" for her role as a titleholder, and an "ill-conceived" leadership transition after the state organization was terminated in September 2018. She retained the title she earned as Miss Tennessee 2018 as the change of leadership did not apply to her earning the title.; Later 2nd runner-up at Miss Tennessee USA 2021 |
| 2017 | Caty Davis | Knoxville | 22 | Miss Lexington | Vocal, "I Have Nothing" | Top 12 | | |
| 2016 | Grace Burgess | Memphis | 22 | Miss Mid-South | Vocal, "Desperado" by The Eagles | Top 10 | Preliminary Talent Award Quality of Life Award Finalist | Contestant at National Sweetheart 2015 pageant |
| 2015 | Hannah Robison | Paris | 21 | Miss Scenic City | Piano, "El Cumbanchero" by Rafael Hernández Marín | Top 7 | America's Choice Quality of Life Award 1st runner-up STEM Scholarship Award | Previously 2nd runner-up at Miss Tennessee Teen USA 2012 |
| 2014 | Hayley Lewis | Nashville | 21 | Miss Tennessee Valley | Vocal, "I (Who Have Nothing)" | Top 10 | | |
| 2013 | Shelby Thompson | Franklin | 23 | Miss Capital City | Vocal, "Con te partirò" | | | 1st runner-up at Miss Tennessee Teen USA 2008 |
| 2012 | Chandler Lawson | Tullahoma | 22 | Miss Chattanooga | Vocal, "Turning Tables" | Top 10 | Quality of Life Award 2nd runner-up | Contestant at National Sweetheart 2011 pageant |
| 2011 | Erin Hatley | Bartlett | 20 | Miss Collierville | Classical Vocal, "Memory" from Cats | Top 10 | | 1st runner-up at Miss Tennessee USA 2016 and 2017 pageants |
| 2010 | Nicole Jordan | Cordova | 21 | Miss Lexington | Vocal, "All by Myself" | | | |
| 2009 | Stefanie Wittler | Soddy-Daisy | 22 | Miss Hamilton County | Vocal, "I Will Always Love You" | 2nd runner-up | Quality of Life Award Finalist | |
| 2008 | Ellen Carrington | Jackson | 21 | Miss Scenic City | Vocal, "Vole Mon Ange" from Svengali | Top 7 | | |
| 2007 | Grace Gore | Nashville | 24 | Miss Lexington | Vocal, "What a Wonderful Day" | Top 16 | Quality of Life Award Finalist | Previously Miss Mississippi Teen USA 2002 |
| 2006 | Blaire Pancake | Chattanooga | 24 | Miss Metropolitan | Vocal, "Attitude" | | | Previously 1st runner-up at Miss Tennessee Teen USA 2000 |
| 2005 | Tara Burns | Nashville | 22 | Miss Music City | Classical Vocal, "Art Is Calling for Me" from The Enchantress by Victor Herbert | | Non-finalist Talent Award | |
| 2004 | Ashley Eicher | Nashville | 24 | Miss Murfreesboro | Vocal, "Take My Hand, Precious Lord" | | Non-finalist Talent Award | |
| 2003 | Jamie Watkins | Soddy-Daisy | 23 | Miss Scenic City | Vocal, "If I Can Dream" | | | 4th runner-up at National Sweetheart 2001 pageant |
| 2002 | Valli Kugler | Rutherford | 22 | Miss UT Martin | Vocal, "At Last" | | | |
| 2001 | Stephanie Culberson | Knoxville | 21 | Miss Cleveland | Classical Piano, Fantaisie-Impromptu | 2nd runner-up | Preliminary Evening Wear Award Preliminary Swimsuit Award | Later Miss Tennessee USA 2004; 4th runner-up at Miss USA 2004 pageant |
| 2000 | Beth Hood | Cleveland | 21 | Miss Cleveland | Vocal, "Desperado" | | Non-finalist Talent Award | Later Miss Tennessee USA 2003; 4th runner-up at Miss USA 2003 pageant |
| 1999 | Allison Alderson | Jackson | 22 | Miss Memphis | Piano / Vocal Medley, "Ain't No Mountain High Enough" & "River Deep – Mountain High" | | Waterford Scholarship for Business Marketing & Management | Triple Crown winner: Previously Miss Tennessee Teen USA 1994 Top 6 at Miss Teen USA 1994 pageant; Later Miss Tennessee USA 2002; Married to Rascal Flatts musician, Jay DeMarcus Sister of Miss District of Columbia USA 1999, Amy Alderson |
| 1998 | Heather Heath | Nashville | 21 | Miss Heart of Tennessee | Vocal, "Think of Me" from Phantom of the Opera | | Quality of Life Award Finalist | Previously Missouri's Junior Miss 1995 |
| 1997 | Lanna Keck | Knoxville | 23 | Miss Milan No-Till | Gospel Vocal, "Go Light Your World" | | | |
| 1996 | Jeni Stephens | Memphis | 23 | Miss Memphis | Popular Vocal, "Operator" | | | |
| 1995 | Alison Shumate | Union City | 21 | Miss Knoxville | Vocal Medley, "Crazy for You" & "I Got Rhythm" | | Non-finalist Interview Award | Daughter of Miss Tennessee 1967, Linda Workman |
| 1994 | Lori Smith | Ocoee | 21 | Miss Tennessee Tech | Piano, "The Firefly" by Anton Bilotti | | | |
| 1993 | Kathleen Brang | Greeneville | 24 | Miss Historic Jonesborough | Popular Vocal, "Dare to Dream" | | | |
| 1992 | Leah Hulan | Murfreesboro | 24 | Miss Knoxville | Clogging, "Can't Stop Now" | | | Later Miss Tennessee USA 1994 |
| 1991 | Jill Horn | Memphis | 23 | Miss Memphis | Vocal, "On a Clear Day You Can See Forever" | | | |
| 1990 | Dana Brown | Memphis | 25 | Miss Frontier Days | Vocal & Piano, "The Glory of Love" & "I Can't Give You Anything but Love, Baby" | 2nd runner-up | | |
| 1989 | Lisa Robertson | Collegedale | 23 | Miss Cleveland | Violin, "Orange Blossom Special" | | | |
| 1988 | Carrie Ruth Folks | New Johnsonville | 20 | Miss Bluegrass Festival | A capella Vocal, "Sweet Dreams" | | Non-finalist Talent Award | |
| 1987 | Regina Lynn "Reggie" Athnos | Clarksville | 23 | Miss Tennessee Peach Festival | Flute Medley, "I'll Fly Away" & "Amazing Grace" | | | |
| 1986 | Kris Ann Beasley | Memphis | 22 | Miss Memphis | Vocal | Did not compete; originally first runner-up, later assumed the title after Cash won Miss America 1987 | | |
| 1986 | Kellye Michelle Cash | Milan | 21 | Miss Milan Crown and Scepter | Piano / Vocal, "I'll Be Home" | Winner | Preliminary Swimsuit Award Preliminary Talent Award | Mother of Miss Virginia 2021, Tatum Shepard |
| 1985 | Sonya Elizabeth Pleasant | Mountain City | 22 | Miss Watauga Valley | Vocal, "I Fall to Pieces" | | | |
| 1984 | Shelley Susan Mangrum | Nashville | 23 | Miss West Tennessee State Fair | Vocal, "And the World Goes 'Round" | Top 10 | | |
| 1983 | Moira Alice Kaye | Oak Ridge | 23 | Miss Roane County | Vocal, "Memory" from Cats | | Non-finalist Talent Award | |
| 1982 | Desiree Denise Daniels | Chattanooga | 22 | Miss Hamilton County | Popular Vocal, "Don't Cry Out Loud" | 1st runner-up | Preliminary Swimsuit Award | Later Miss Tennessee USA 1984, 2nd runner-up at Miss USA 1984 pageant |
| 1981 | Angelina Irene Johnson | Jackson | 20 | Miss Madison County | Ventriloquism, "Laverne & Shirley" | | | |
| 1980 | Sarah Ann Leonard | Jonesborough | 20 | Miss Historic Jonesborough | Popular Vocal, "We Could Have Had it All" | | | |
| 1979 | Elise Neal | Paris | 21 | Miss Okra | Piano, "Prelude in C minor" by Rachmaninoff | | Non-finalist Talent Award | |
| 1978 | Jill Beshears | Memphis | 22 | Miss Memphis State University | Vocal Medley, "You'll Never Walk Alone" & "Climb Ev'ry Mountain" | | | |
| 1977 | Linda Moore | Madison | 22 | Miss Nashville | Vocal, "Evening Gowns Are not for Children" | Top 10 | Preliminary Swimsuit Award | |
| 1976 | Terry Alden | Memphis | 21 | Miss Memphis | Classical Piano, "Toccata" | | | |
| 1975 | Marion Burgess | Memphis | 21 | Miss Bells | Tap Dance, "I'm Gonna Live Till I Die" | | | |
| 1974 | Deborah Kincaid | Memphis | 21 | Miss Memphis State University | Vocal Medley, "Once in a Lifetime," "In my own Lifetime," & "This Is My Life" | Top 10 | Preliminary Talent Award | |
| 1973 | Anne Randle Galloway | Knoxville | 20 | Miss Memphis | Piano, Rhapsody in Blue | | | |
| 1972 | Debbie Cathey | Nashville | 20 | Miss Nashville | Semi-classical Vocal, "Amazing Grace" | | | |
| 1971 | Marsha McDonald | Nashville | 21 | Miss Memphis State University | Ballet, "Over and Over Again" | | | |
| 1970 | Carol Ferrante | Memphis | 21 | Miss Memphis | Vocal | | | |
| 1969 | Mary Cox | Johnson City | 20 | Miss Johnson City | Semi-classical Vocal, "One Kiss" from The New Moon | | Non-finalist Talent Award | |
| 1968 | Brenda Seal | Kingsport | 19 | Miss East Tennessee State University | Popular Vocal, "What Now My Love" | Top 10 | | Contestant at National Sweetheart 1967 pageant |
| 1967 | Linda Workman | Martin | 18 | Miss UT Martin | Vocal, "I Don't Care" | | | Mother of Miss Tennessee 1995, Alison Shumate |
| 1966 | Vicki Hurd | Kingsport | 19 | Miss Carter County | Original Vocal, "I'm in a Pageant" | 2nd runner-up | | Previously National Sweetheart 1966 |
| 1965 | Marcia Murray | Paris | 19 | Miss Paris | Popular Vocal, "Spellbound" | | | |
| 1964 | Rita Munsey | New Tazewell | 20 | Miss Knoxville | Vocal Medley & Accordion, "You Don't Know Me" & "Walkin' After Midnight" | | | Rita Munsey Doss died at age 71 on Oct. 15, 2015 in Nashville, Tenn. |
| 1963 | Martha Truett | Tiptonville | | Miss Bells | Piano, Rhapsody In Blue | 3rd runner-up | | |
| 1962 | Margaret Petty | Nashville | 19 | Miss Nashville | Vocal, "Something Wonderful" | | | |
| 1961 | Rita Wilson | Humboldt | 20 | Miss Bells | Vocal, "I'm Doing Alright for a Mountain Gal" | | | Previously National Sweetheart 1959 |
| 1960 | Jenny Thomas | Nashville | 19 | Miss Nashville | Modern Ballet, Porgy and Bess | | | |
| 1959 | Marion "Mickey" Wayland | Knoxville | 18 | Miss Knoxville | Piano / Vocal, "Près des remparts de Séville" from Carmen & "I Cain't Say No" | Top 10 | | |
| 1958 | Patricia Eaves | Cookeville | | Miss Putnam County | Dramatic Monologue, "Viola's Ring Scene" from Twelfth Night | | | |
| 1957 | Amanda Lee Whitman | Nashville | | Miss Davidson County | Trampoline / Tumbling, "The Third Man Theme" | | | Performed the first trampoline talent act in the Miss America competition. Amanda Whitman Henry died at age 72 on June 8, 2012, in Hixon, Tennessee. |
| 1956 | Shelby Bailey | Humboldt | | Miss Gadsden | Vocal, "It Takes Two to Tango" | | | |
| 1955 | Patty Williams | Jackson | | Miss Lambuth College | Vocal, "The Student Prince" | | | |
| 1954 | Gerry Johnson | Nashville | | Miss Nashville | Vocal / Character Pantomime, "The Deadwood Stage" | Top 10 | | |
| 1953 | Ruth Ann Barker | Trenton | | Miss Gibson County | Vocal | | | |
| 1952 | Gloria Ruthe Williams | Chattanooga | 20 | Miss Chattanooga | Vocal, "Lover, When You're Near Me" | | | |
| 1951 | Jean Harper | Memphis | | Miss Shelby County | Vocal, "Smoke Gets in Your Eyes" | Top 15 | | Later Miss Tennessee USA 1952; 3rd runner-up at Miss USA 1952 pageant |
| 1950 | Greta Marie Graham | Memphis | 19 | Miss Memphis | Organ, "Tico-Tico no Fubá" | | | |
| 1949 | Adelyn Louise Sumner | Knoxville | 22 | | Modeling / Speech | | | |
| 1948 | Lois Jeanette Welch | Memphis | | Miss Memphis | Vocal & Fashion Design, "Gianni Mia" | Top 15 | | Multiple Tennessee representatives Contestants competed under local title at Miss America pageant |
| 1948 | Dorothy Free | Chattanooga | | Miss Tennessee | Vocal Medley, "Let my Song Fill Your Heart" & "Embraceable You" | | Preliminary Talent Award | Multiple Tennessee representatives Contestants competed under local title at Miss America pageant |
| 1947 | Dorothy Cunningham | | | Miss Chattanooga | Tap Dance | | | Multiple Tennessee representatives Contestants competed under local title at Miss America pageant |
| 1947 | Barbara Jo Walker | Memphis | 21 | Miss Memphis | Art Display & Vocal Medley, "One Kiss" & "Un Bel Di" from Madama Butterfly | Winner | Preliminary Talent Award | Multiple Tennessee representatives Contestants competed under local title at Miss America pageant |
| 1947 | Georgia Cunningham | | | Miss Tennessee | Tap Dance | Top 15 | | Multiple Tennessee representatives Contestants competed under local title at Miss America pageant |
| 1946 | Wilda Bowman | Chattanooga | | | | | | |
| 1945 | Lee Henson | Chattanooga | | | Vocal Medley, "Dreams" & "I Didn't Know the Gun Was Loaded" | Top 13 | Preliminary Swimsuit Award | |
| 1944 | Marian Weller | Chattanooga | | | Vocal, "Some Day I'll Find You" | | | |
| 1943 | Frances Eakes | Chattanooga | | Miss Chattanooga | | | | |
| 1942 | No Tennessee representative at Miss America pageant | | | | | | | |
| 1941 | Katherine Gammon | Knoxville | | Miss Knoxville | | | | Multiple Tennessee representatives Contestants competed under local title at Miss America pageant |
| 1941 | Martha McKinney | Nashville | | Miss Tennessee | Acrobatic / Tap Dance | | | Multiple Tennessee representatives Contestants competed under local title at Miss America pageant |
| 1940 | Thelma McGhee | Knoxville | | Miss Knoxville | | | | Multiple Tennessee representatives Contestants competed under local title at Miss America pageant |
| 1940 | Christine Webb | Centerville | | Miss Tennessee | Dramatic Monologue, "The Waltz" | | | Multiple Tennessee representatives Contestants competed under local title at Miss America pageant |
| 1939 | Judy Jones | Tracy City | | Miss Tennessee | Vocal Medley, "I Surrender" & "Come True" | | | Multiple Tennessee representatives Contestants competed under local title at Miss America pageant |
| 1939 | Louise Bussart | Etowah | | Miss West Tennessee | | | | Multiple Tennessee representatives Contestants competed under local title at Miss America pageant |
| 1938 | Victoria Ann Motlow | Mulberry | | Miss Fayetteville | Vocal, "You Turned the Tables on Me" | | | Original winner, Isobel Carter, resigned due to illness |
| 1937 | No Tennessee representative at Miss America pageant | | | | | | | |
| 1936 | No Tennessee representative at Miss America pageant | | | | | | | |
| 1935 | Sarah Beard | Dickson | | | | | | |
| 1934 | No national pageant was held | | | | | | | |
| 1933 | No Tennessee representative at Miss America pageant | | | | | | | |
| 1932 | No national pageants were held | | | | | | | |
| 1931 | No national pageants were held | | | | | | | |
| 1930 | No national pageants were held | | | | | | | |
| 1929 | No national pageants were held | | | | | | | |
| 1928 | No national pageants were held | | | | | | | |
| 1927 | No Tennessee representative at Miss America pageant | | | | | | | |
| 1926 | No Tennessee representative at Miss America pageant | | | | | | | |
| 1925 | No Tennessee representative at Miss America pageant | | | | | | | |
| 1924 | Ann Elizabeth Warner | | | Miss Nashville | N/A | | | Competed under local title at national pageant |
| 1923 | Elizabeth Mallory | Memphis | | Miss Memphis | N/A | | Evening Dress Award Roller Chair Parade Second Prize | Competed under local title at national pageant |
| 1922 | Ruth Doughty | Memphis | | Miss Memphis | N/A | | | Multiple Tennessee representatives Contestants competed under local title at national pageant |
| 1922 | Sue Burton | Nashville | | Miss Nashville | N/A | | Intercity Beauty Award Second Prize | Multiple Tennessee representatives Contestants competed under local title at national pageant |
| 1921 | No Tennessee representative at Miss America pageant | | | | | | | |
