= 2009 Aaron's 499 =

Race details
- Race 9 of 36 in the 2009 NASCAR Sprint Cup Series
- 2009 Aaron's 499 program cover
- Date: April 26, 2009
- Official name: Aaron's 499
- Location: Talladega Superspeedway, Lincoln, Alabama
- Course: Permanent racing facility
- Course length: 2.66 miles (4.28 km)
- Distance: 188 laps, 500.08 mi (804.8 km)
- Weather: Sunny with temperatures reaching up to 82.4 °F (28.0 °C); wind speeds up to 8.9 miles per hour (14.3 km/h)

Pole position
Driver	Juan Pablo Montoya	Earnhardt Ganassi Racing
- Time: 50.890

Most laps led
Driver	Kyle Busch	Joe Gibbs Racing
- Laps: 42

Winner
No. 09	Brad Keselowski	Phoenix Racing

Television in the United States
- Network: Fox Broadcasting Company
- Announcers: Mike Joy, Darrell Waltrip and Larry McReynolds

The 2009 Aaron's 499 was the ninth race of the 2009 NASCAR Sprint Cup season. With a distance of 500.8 miles (806.0 km), it was held on April 26, 2009 at the 2.66 miles (4.28 km) Talladega Superspeedway in Lincoln, Alabama. Fox Sports broadcast the race starting at 1 PM EDT, with MRN and SiriusXM carrying the radio broadcast over the air and on satellite respectively. The race had nine cautions, 25 different leaders, and 57 lead changes, the most lead changes of the season up until that point.

Brad Keselowski, driving for Phoenix Racing, won the race in his fifth career start (third start in 2009) and led his first career Sprint Cup lap on the final lap of the race (in fact the only lap he led the entire race), while Dale Earnhardt Jr. finished second and Ryan Newman finished third. It would prove to be the only Cup Series victory for Phoenix Racing. This was the first time since Casey Mears's win at the 2007 Coca-Cola 600 in Charlotte that a driver had won his first career win in a major, and the first win in the Aaron's 499 by a first-time driver since Phil Parsons in 1988. It was also the first time a driver's first ever lap led was to win the race. Keselowski dedicated his win to the late Neil Bonnett.

Talladega Superspeedway, the race track where the race was held.

== Background ==
Talladega Superspeedway is one of five superspeedways to hold NASCAR races; the others are Daytona International Speedway, Indianapolis Motor Speedway, Pocono Raceway and Michigan International Speedway. The standard track at the speedway is a four-turn superspeedway that is 2.66 miles (4.28 km) long. The track's turns are banked at thirty-three degrees, while the front stretch, the location of the finish line, is banked at 16.5 degrees. The back stretch has a two-degree banking. Talladega Superspeedway can seat up to 143,231 people.

Before the race, Jeff Gordon led the Drivers' Championship with 1242 points, and Jimmie Johnson stood in second with 1157. Kurt Busch was third in the Drivers' Championship with 1144 points, six ahead of Tony Stewart and 56 ahead of Denny Hamlin in fourth and fifth. In sixth, Clint Bowyer with 1052 points was 26 points ahead of Kyle Busch in seventh, as Carl Edwards with 1023 points was 31 points ahead of David Reutimann, and 48 points in front of Kasey Kahne.

== Entry list ==
No.	Driver	Make	Owner
00	David Reutimann	Toyota	Michael Waltrip
1	Martin Truex Jr.	Chevrolet	Teresa Earnhardt
2	Kurt Busch	Dodge	Walter Czarnecki
4	Eric McClure	Chevrolet	Jerry McClure
5	Mark Martin	Chevrolet	Mary Hendrick
6	David Ragan	Ford	Mike Dee
07	Casey Mears	Chevrolet	Richard Childress
7	Robby Gordon	Toyota	Robby Gordon
09	Brad Keselowski	Chevrolet	James Finch
9	Kasey Kahne	Dodge	George Gillett Jr.
11	Denny Hamlin	Toyota	J.D. Gibbs
12	David Stremme	Dodge	Roger Penske
13	Max Papis	Toyota	Bob Germain
14	Tony Stewart	Chevrolet	Margaret Haas
16	Greg Biffle	Ford	Jack Roush
17	Matt Kenseth	Ford	John Henry
18	Kyle Busch	Toyota	Joe Gibbs
19	Elliott Sadler	Dodge	George Gillett Jr.
20	Joey Logano	Toyota	Joe Gibbs
24	Jeff Gordon	Chevrolet	Rick Hendrick
26	Jamie McMurray	Ford	Geoff Smith
29	Kevin Harvick	Chevrolet	Richard Childress
31	Jeff Burton	Chevrolet	Richard Childress
33	Clint Bowyer	Chevrolet	Bobby Ginn III
34	John Andretti	Chevrolet	Teresa Earnhardt
36	Scott Riggs	Toyota	Tommy Baldwin
39	Ryan Newman	Chevrolet	Tony Stewart
41	Jeremy Mayfield	Toyota	Jeremy Mayfield
42	Juan Pablo Montoya	Chevrolet	Teresa Earnhardt
43	Reed Sorenson	Dodge	Richard Petty
44	A.J. Allmendinger	Dodge	George Gillett Jr.
47	Marcos Ambrose	Toyota	Rob Kauffman
48	Jimmie Johnson	Chevrolet	Jeff Gordon
55	Michael Waltrip	Toyota	Michael Waltrip
66	Michael McDowell	Toyota	Phil Parsons
71	David Gilliland	Chevrolet	Kevin Buckler
77	Sam Hornish Jr.	Dodge	Bill Davis
78	Regan Smith	Chevrolet	Barney Visser
82	Scott Speed	Toyota	Dietrich Mateschitz
83	Brian Vickers	Toyota	Dietrich Mateschitz
87	Joe Nemechek	Toyota	Andrea Nemechek
88	Dale Earnhardt Jr.	Chevrolet	Rick Hendrick
96	Bobby Labonte	Ford	Jeffrey Moorad
98	Paul Menard	Ford	Max Jones
99	Carl Edwards	Ford	Jack Roush

== Qualifying ==
Pos.	No.	Driver	Make	Avg. Speed	Time	Behind
1	42	Juan Pablo Montoya	Chevrolet	188.171	50.890	0.000
2	16	Greg Biffle	Ford	188.141	50.898	00.008
3	1	Martin Truex Jr.	Chevrolet	187.971	50.944	00.054
4	77	Sam Hornish Jr.	Dodge	187.953	50.949	00.059
5	33	Clint Bowyer	Chevrolet	187.919	50.958	00.068
6	78	Regan Smith	Chevrolet	187.897	50.964	00.074
7	5	Mark Martin	Chevrolet	187.861	50.974	00.084
8	82	Scott Speed	Toyota	187.824	50.984	00.094
9	09	Brad Keselowski	Chevrolet	187.687	51.021	00.131
10	6	David Ragan	Ford	187.640	51.034	00.144
11	88	Dale Earnhardt Jr.	Chevrolet	187.610	51.042	00.152
12	96	Bobby Labonte	Ford	187.607	51.043	00.153
13	17	Matt Kenseth	Ford	187.574	51.052	00.162
14	24	Jeff Gordon	Chevrolet	187.423	51.093	00.203
15	07	Casey Mears	Chevrolet	187.412	51.096	00.206
16	99	Carl Edwards	Ford	187.383	51.104	00.214
17	87	Joe Nemechek	Toyota	187.379	51.105	00.215
18	11	Denny Hamlin	Toyota	187.163	51.164	00.274
19	29	Kevin Harvick	Chevrolet	187.071	51.189	00.299
20	31	Jeff Burton	Chevrolet	187.061	51.192	00.302
21	36	Scott Riggs	Toyota	186.900	51.236	00.346
22	20	Joey Logano	Toyota	186.889	51.239	00.349
23	18	Kyle Busch	Toyota	186.831	51.255	00.365
24	98	Paul Menard	Ford	186.823	51.257	00.367
25	39	Ryan Newman	Chevrolet	186.663	51.301	00.411
26	71	David Gilliland	Chevrolet	186.638	51.308	00.418
27	41	Jeremy Mayfield	Toyota	186.627	51.311	00.421
28	2	Kurt Busch	Dodge	186.518	51.341	00.451
29	14	Tony Stewart	Chevrolet	186.423	51.367	00.477
30	83	Brian Vickers	Toyota	186.401	51.373	00.483
31	55	Michael Waltrip	Toyota	186.260	51.412	00.522
32	26	Jamie McMurray	Ford	186.245	51.416	00.526
33	00	David Reutimann	Toyota	186.108	51.454	00.564
34	47	Marcos Ambrose	Toyota	185.596	51.596	00.706
35	9	Kasey Kahne	Dodge	185.459	51.634	00.744
36	48	Jimmie Johnson	Chevrolet	185.384	51.655	00.765
37	12	David Stremme	Dodge	184.765	51.828	00.938
38	44	AJ Allmendinger	Dodge	184.608	51.872	00.982
39	19	Elliott Sadler	Dodge	184.161	51.998	01.108
40	34	John Andretti	Chevrolet	182.738	52.403	01.513
41	43	Reed Sorenson	Dodge	185.902	51.511	00.621
42	7	Robby Gordon	Toyota	185.323	51.672	00.782
43	13	Max Papis	Toyota	186.460	51.357	00.467
44	66	Michael McDowell	Toyota	185.362	51.661	
45	4	Eric McClure	Chevrolet	184.048	52.030	
WD	64	Geoffrey Bodine	Toyota	0.000	0.000	0.000

== Race recap ==
To begin pre-race events, Jeff Sauls, Chaplain Emergency Crews and Alabama Raceway Ministry, delivered the invocation at 1:00 P.M Central Standard Time (2:00 pm Eastern Standard time). Then Katie Stam, Miss America 2009, performed the national anthem. At 1:08 pm, University of Alabama head football coach, Nick Saban, delivered the starting command.

During the pace laps, Scott Speed made an emergency last-minute pit stop, causing him to start the race 1 lap down, since the Talladega races are impound races. Before the green flag, six drivers (including all four Richard Petty Motorsports cars) had to move to the back of the field due to engine changes: Brad Keselowski, Kasey Kahne, David Stremme, Elliott Sadler, Reed Sorenson, and A. J. Allmendinger. Robby Gordon was also forced to start at the rear as his car height was too low and failed post-qualifying inspection.

At the drop of the green flag at 1:20 pm, polesitter Juan Pablo Montoya claimed the lead and stayed in that position for four laps. On lap 5, Dale Earnhardt Jr. passed him for the lead with drafting help from Denny Hamlin. Earnhardt Jr. led for one lap before being repassed by Montoya.

On lap 7, David Ragan, who had won the Nationwide Series race the day before, took the lead on the back straightaway with the help from Joey Logano, who had assisted Ragan in that win. Moments later, the first caution flag was waved for a large crash in turn 3. Matt Kenseth, while in the middle groove, moved up in front of Jeff Gordon (driving a retro Pepsi Challenge paint scheme used by Darrell Waltrip in 1983) and made contact, causing Gordon to wobble and get loose on the high side. Gordon then made contact with David Gilliland, getting him loose, then came down and collected 14 more cars, including Allmendinger, Kahne, Sadler, Casey Mears, Kurt Busch, Mark Martin, Max Papis, Jamie McMurray, Kevin Harvick, Clint Bowyer, Scott Riggs, and Bobby Labonte. Martin, who had won the Phoenix race the previous week, took a very hard hit, as his car went over the hood of Riggs', smashed into the wall driver's side first, and got fishtailed by Kahne as his came to a rest in the infield grass. Bowyer and Gilliland also went head-on into the outside wall.

Under this caution, Speed got the free pass. Most of the drivers pitted under the caution on lap 9. As the caution period continued, John Andretti, Greg Biffle, and Ryan Newman each led a lap before making their pit stops. When the race restarted on lap 13, Logano claimed the lead. One lap later, Martin Truex Jr. took it away from Logano with help from Earnhardt Jr. Truex Jr. continued to lead until lap 18, when Montoya passed him for it. One lap later, Busch, upon returned after the huge wreck on lap 6, took the lead from Montoya and led a lap before being passed by Hamlin. On lap 22, Jeff Burton took the lead and led for a lap before being passed by Hamlin. Burton repassed him for the lead on lap 24. On lap 27, Busch reclaimed the lead when Burton was shuffled out of line. As this took place, Burton reported having no voltage in his car. One lap later, the second caution was thrown for debris on the track. Burton was penalized for pitting early to replace his car battery.

On the lap 34 restart, Kyle Busch claimed the lead. He led for the next seven laps. On lap 38, Truex Jr. briefly took the lead on the back straightaway before Busch repassed him with a shove from Michael Waltrip. In the middle of the next lap, Truex Jr. passed Ky. Busch, but lost the lead coming into the tri-oval. On lap 40, Ky. Busch, assisted by David Ragan, was travelling alongside Jimmie Johnson, who was being pushed by David Stremme. On lap 41, Ky. Busch, pushed by Speed, raced side-by-side with Johnson, who was being pushed by Earnhardt Jr. On lap 42, the third caution flag waved when Michael Waltrip cut down in front of Marcos Ambrose in the tri-oval and spun out. Waltrip saved his car and barely avoided hitting the inside retaining wall. The free pass went to Allmendinger, 22 laps down after being involved in the first crash.

During the pit stops, Scott Speed stayed out for a lap to claim the lead from Kyle Busch, but returned it to him when he pitted on lap 45. The race restarted on lap 46 with Busch leading. Busch led for two laps before being passed by Earnhardt Jr. on lap 48. Earnhardt Jr. and Martin Truex Jr. had such a run that they were able to get a few seconds ahead of the main pack. Eanrhardt Jr. led until he was passed by Matt Kenseth on the inside on lap 50. Kenseth led for three laps before Earnhardt Jr. repassed him. Earnhardt Jr. continued to lead for the next seven laps. On lap 60, the fourth caution waved when Kurt Busch spun out in the tri-oval after being touched in the left-rear by David Stremme. Busch's spin happened in exactly the same spot that Waltrip's spin happened in to bring out the previous caution. He also saved his car. During this caution, Kevin Harvick, Jeff Gordon, and Kasey Kahne all returned to the track multiple laps down after repairs from the lap 7 crash. Under the caution, Jeff Burton received the free pass. Waltrip led for a lap during the caution before pitting and giving the lead to Martin Truex Jr. At the restart on lap 64, Truex Jr. led the field to the green flag.

The Top 4 drivers were able to get a strong start and pull away from the lead pack. Truex Jr. led until he was passed on the inside by Hamlin on lap 75. Two laps later, Montoya took the lead. He led for one lap before being passed by Earnhardt Jr., who had a shove from David Stremme. Two laps later, Jimmie Johnson claimed the lead with a shove from Earnhardt Jr. Johnson led for one lap before being passed by Hamlin. On lap 82, Earnhardt Jr. and his JR Motorsports driver Brad Keselowski got together on the back straightaway and went below the yellow line. Though Earnhardt Jr. was able to blend back into the field, Keselowski ended up losing the draft and fell all the way to the back of the lead pack. On lap 83, Sam Hornish Jr. took the lead.

Two laps later, debris on the backstretch brought out the fifth caution. Most of the drivers pitted under the caution, while Jeff Burton received the free pass. Joe Nemechek led one lap before pitting, while Paul Menard stayed out and led the field to the restart on lap 88. Menard was passed one lap later by Denny Hamlin, who had help from Joey Logano. Hamlin led for two laps before Jimmie Johnson passed him on lap 92. Johnson led for a lap before Hamlin repassed him. On lap 100, the field began to run side by side, led by Hamlin on the outside as Casey Mears led a line on the inside. On Lap 111, Earnhardt Jr. and a lap-down Jeff Burton hooked up and got such a run they were able to get a five-second lead over the main pack for a few laps. Burton was attempting to get back on the lead lap the hard way. On lap 112, Menard pitted, followed a lap later by Reed Sorenson.

On lap 114, Earnhardt Jr.'s runaway lead vanished as Martin Truex Jr. claimed the lead, and Earnhardt Jr. fell back to 11th place. Truex Jr. led until lap 116, when he was passed by Joey Logano, who was repassed by Truex Jr. a lap later. On lap 119, Burton got back on the tail end of the lead lap. On lap 121, Brian Vickers passed Truex Jr. for the lead. Vickers led two laps before Truex Jr. repassed him with a push from Kyle Busch. One lap later, the sixth caution came out for debris. On lap 125, under caution, Carl Edwards claimed the lead as the leaders pitted. Jeremy Mayfield also stayed out. Both Edwards and Mayfield pitted one lap later and gave the lead to Kyle Busch, who had won the race off pit road.

Kyle Busch led the field to the green flag on lap 127. The field shuffled around during the next seven laps, with Busch and Hamlin swapping the lead several times in the middle of the track on lap 132. On lap 134, Elliott Sadler claimed the lead with help from Brad Keselowski. Sadler led for three laps before Kurt Busch passed him with help from Earnhardt Jr. On lap 140, Hamlin pushed David Reutimann to the lead, but went around Reutimann at the finish line to lead the lap. One lap later, Casey Mears claimed the lead. He led until lap 143 when Jeff Burton passed him with assistance from Earnhardt Jr., who took the lead from Burton on the next lap on the middle groove. Kurt Busch passed Earnhardt Jr. on lap 145, and led one lap before Earnhardt Jr. repassed him.

On lap 146, the seventh caution came out for debris. Under the yellow flag, Jeremy Mayfield stayed out to collect five bonus points for leading a lap as most of the drivers took their final pit stops of the day. Kurt Busch led the field to the green flag on lap 150. He led for four laps before his brother passed him with help from Earnhardt Jr. Busch led for fifteen laps before Matt Kenseth passed him on lap 169. Kenseth led for a lap before Busch repassed him. On lap 171, the eighth caution came out when Busch and Truex crashed in turn 3. It began when Jeff Burton made contact with Busch's rear bumper, causing him to wobble, and eventually spin out after contact from Montoya, while behind them, Truex got turned loose by Ragan.

Matt Kenseth claimed the lead and led the field to the green flag on lap 175. One lap later, Hamlin got loose but saved his car, and teamed up with Ryan Newman to make a run past the leaders, allowing Newman to take the lead from Kenseth two laps later. On lap 180, the ninth caution flag was waved for a large crash on the backstretch. It started when Montoya, running in the middle of the lead pack, was touched by Hamlin, causing Montoya to spin into Bobby Labonte and collected seven more cars, including Martin Truex Jr., Robby Gordon, David Stremme, Jeremy Mayfield, Jimmie Johnson, Michael Waltrip, and Sam Hornish Jr. Gordon took the worst of it, as his car was sent head on into inside wall, caving in the entire front portion of his car. Newman continued to lead at the restart on lap 184, drafting with Earnhardt Jr.

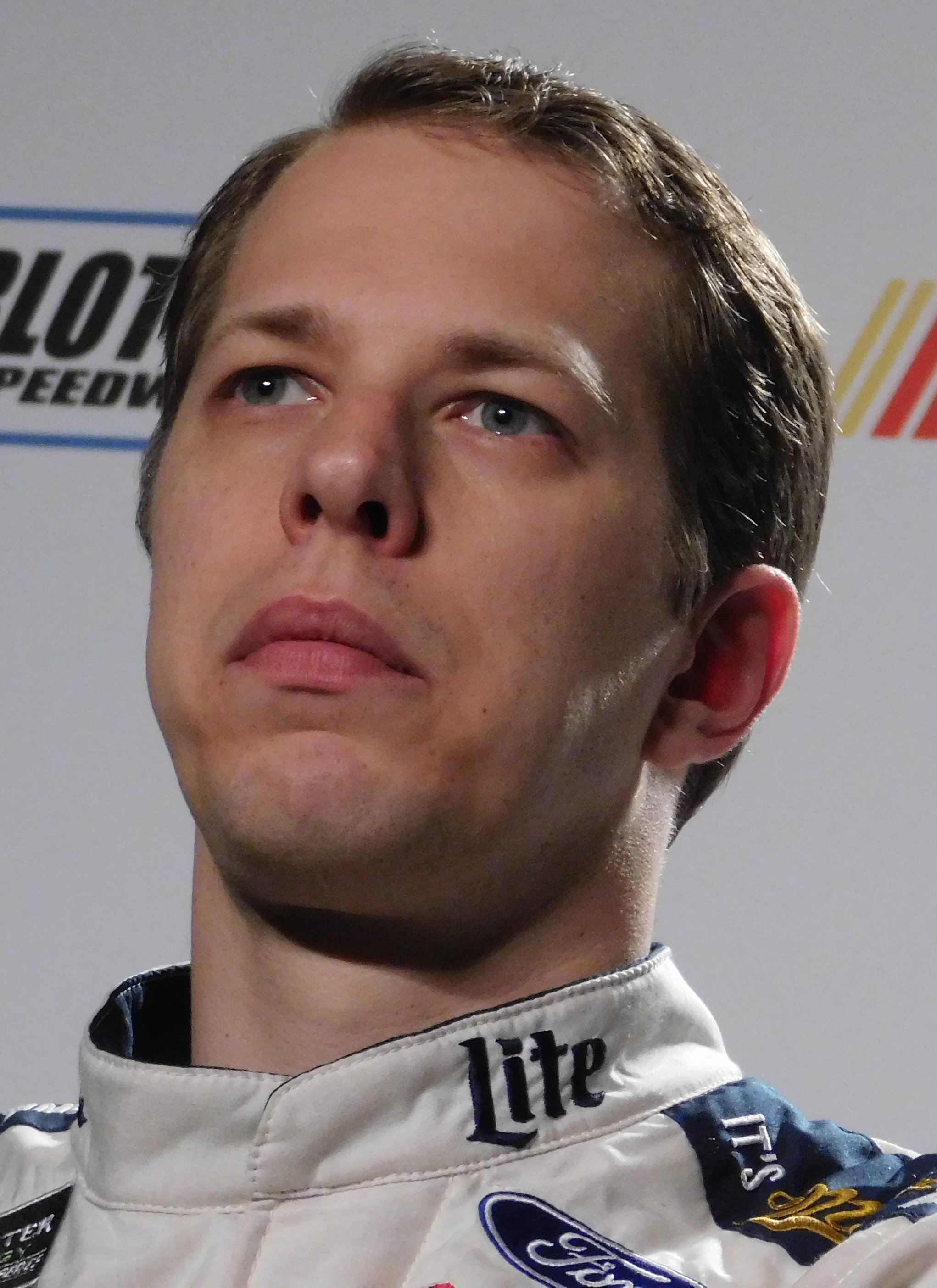
Brad Keselowski won the race.

Carl Edwards passed Newman for the lead to take the white flag on lap 187, pushed by Brad Keselowski. Edwards and Keselowski were ahead of Newman, who was being pushed by Earnhardt Jr. heading down the back straightaway. Coming into the tri-oval, Edwards attempted to block Keselowski, and Keselowski made contact with Edwards' left rear quarter panel. Edwards spun backwards and went airborne. Earnhardt Jr. slipped past Edwards on the inside, and Edwards' airborne car was struck head-on by Newman. This second hit propelled Edwards higher and sent him flying straight into the catch fence. Eight fans were injured by flying debris; the most serious one being a woman whose jaw was broken, and was airlifted to a nearby hospital.

As Keselowski crossed the finish line and won the race with Earnhardt Jr. right behind him, Edwards landed hard on his wheels and screeched to a halt in the middle of the track 100 feet (1,200 in) away from the finish line. No other cars except Newman had been in the vicinity of Edwards' car, and all of the cars behind him made it past without incident, although Greg Biffle came very close to hitting Edwards. After a few moments, Edwards climbed out of his car and jogged to the finish line to a standing ovation from the crowd, which Mike Joy described as having "shades of Ricky Bobby". Although Edwards did cross the start-finish line but on foot, it still did not count as a successful finish since his car did not cross the finish line and he was handed a DNF in 24th position. When Edwards was interviewed on Larry King Live, he responded, "I'm kind of a Will Ferrell fan. He did that at the end of Talladega Nights."

== Race results ==
Finish	No.	Driver	Make	Team	Laps	Led	Status	Pts	Winnings (USD)
1	09	Brad Keselowski	Chevrolet	Phoenix Racing	188	1	running	190	312075
2	88	Dale Earnhardt Jr.	Chevrolet	Hendrick Motorsports	188	20	running	175	224200
3	39	Ryan Newman	Chevrolet	Stewart–Haas Racing	188	10	running	170	201104
4	47	Marcos Ambrose	Toyota	JTG Daugherty Racing	188	0	running	160	161598
5	82	Scott Speed	Toyota	Red Bull Racing Team	188	1	running	160	144798
6	2	Kurt Busch	Dodge	Penske Racing	188	13	running	155	130750
7	16	Greg Biffle	Ford	Roush Fenway Racing	188	1	running	151	140225
8	83	Brian Vickers	Toyota	Red Bull Racing Team	188	2	running	147	136648
9	20	Joey Logano	Toyota	Joe Gibbs Racing	188	4	running	143	153276
10	31	Jeff Burton	Chevrolet	Richard Childress Racing	188	6	running	139	146456
11	43	Reed Sorenson	Dodge	Richard Petty Motorsports	188	0	running	130	137401
12	6	David Ragan	Ford	Roush Fenway Racing	188	2	running	132	107500
13	98	Paul Menard	Ford	Yates Racing	188	2	running	129	129431
14	87	Joe Nemechek	Toyota	NEMCO Motorsports	188	1	running	126	92900
15	78	Regan Smith	Chevrolet	Furniture Row Racing	188	0	running	118	91775
16	07	Casey Mears	Chevrolet	Richard Childress Racing	188	2	running	120	110175
17	17	Matt Kenseth	Ford	Roush Fenway Racing	188	9	running	117	136315
18	13	Max Papis	Toyota	Germain Racing	188	0	running	109	88975
19	19	Elliott Sadler	Dodge	Richard Petty Motorsports	188	3	running	111	100275
20	42	Juan Pablo Montoya	Chevrolet	Earnhardt Ganassi Racing	188	7	running	108	133298
21	55	Michael Waltrip	Toyota	Michael Waltrip Racing	188	1	running	105	98600
22	11	Denny Hamlin	Toyota	Joe Gibbs Racing	188	28	running	102	104275
23	14	Tony Stewart	Chevrolet	Stewart–Haas Racing	188	0	running	94	101198
24	99	Carl Edwards	Ford	Roush Fenway Racing	187	2	crash	96	139506
25	18	Kyle Busch	Toyota	Joe Gibbs Racing	187	42	running	98	138273
26	00	David Reutimann	Toyota	Michael Waltrip Racing	187	0	running	85	107548
27	34	John Andretti	Chevrolet	Front Row Motorsports	187	1	running	87	94825
28	96	Bobby Labonte	Ford	Yates/ Hall of Fame Racing	179	0	crash	79	113804
29	7	Robby Gordon	Toyota	Robby Gordon Motorsports	179	0	crash	76	104635
30	48	Jimmie Johnson	Chevrolet	Hendrick Motorsports	179	2	crash	78	137026
31	12	David Stremme	Dodge	Penske Racing	179	0	crash	70	118915
32	41	Jeremy Mayfield	Toyota	Mayfield Motorsports	179	1	crash	72	82075
33	1	Martin Truex Jr.	Chevrolet	Earnhardt Ganassi Racing	179	24	crash	69	121190
34	77	Sam Hornish Jr.	Dodge	Penske Racing	179	3	crash	66	103685
35	44	A.J. Allmendinger	Dodge	Richard Petty Motorsports	164	0	running	58	84675
36	9	Kasey Kahne	Dodge	Richard Petty Motorsports	133	0	running	55	123973
37	24	Jeff Gordon	Chevrolet	Hendrick Motorsports	128	0	running	52	121201
38	29	Kevin Harvick	Chevrolet	Richard Childress Racing	127	0	running	49	118353
39	33	Clint Bowyer	Chevrolet	Richard Childress Racing	8	0	running	46	88875
40	71	David Gilliland	Chevrolet	TRG Motorsports	6	0	crash	43	80550
41	36	Scott Riggs	Toyota	Tommy Baldwin Racing	6	0	crash	40	80325
42	26	Jamie McMurray	Ford	Roush Fenway Racing	6	0	crash	37	88155
43	5	Mark Martin	Chevrolet	Hendrick Motorsports	6	0	crash	34	88464

== Aftermath of the last lap crash ==
In the wake of the crash, the catch fence was raised by 10 feet and was strengthened for the fall race in order to prevent such an incident from occurring again. In addition, NASCAR implemented a rule for the fall race at Talladega in which drivers were not allowed to bump draft in the corners as an attempt to reduce multicar crashes that often took place at that part of the track. Finally, in 2010, the wing on the Car of Tomorrow was replaced by a spoiler due to its role in Edwards' crash, as well as other wrecks in which the wing provided enough aerodynamic lift to render the roof flaps useless. NASCAR on Fox analyst Darrell Waltrip compared Edwards' crash to a one in 1987, when Bobby Allison blew a tire and went into the catchfence near the start/finish line, ripping out several feet of it and injuring several fans. That crash made NASCAR mandate restrictor plates at Daytona and Talladega to slow down the cars from such extremely high speeds. Although Edwards quickly congratulated Keselowski for the win, the two drivers began a rivalry that heated up almost every year. After a few incidents in the NNS with Keselowski in 2009 they were given a warning by NASCAR on their bitter feelings.

Almost a year later, in the closing laps of the Kobalt Tools 500 at Atlanta, Edwards (a few laps down after an accident with him early in the race) intentionally rushed for Keselowski's bumper and turned him. This was a wreck that resembled what Keselowski did to Edwards at Talladega the previous year. Keselowski climbed out mostly unscathed, and with an injured leg, he limped down the track to the ambulance. Not long after the crash when reviewing radio quotes, NASCAR black-flagged Edwards for the finish after finding out that Edwards did intentionally turn Keselowski. Later that year, Edwards was leading a Nationwide Series race at Gateway Raceway when Keselowski, who said during a red-flag period that he had the fastest car, bumped him in turn 1 of the final lap to take the lead. In return, Edwards spun Keselowski into the pack in turn 4 of the final lap, causing in a multiple car collision and won the race. Keselowski was rammed hard by charging cars and spun in circles. Keselowski climbed out with minor injuries and a grimace on his face and in victory lane, Edwards confessed publicly that the crash was not an accident. When interviewed, Keselowski furiously said, "I found a way to beat him but he just wrecked me ... it is not cool when I wreck on the straightaway going over 180 miles per hour. I am sure Edwards will think about how great he is or how cool he is in his own little mind but that is not reality." That week, Edwards and Keselowski met with NASCAR, who penalized both drivers' points for the Nationwide Series championship standings, fined them both $25,000, and requested them to calm down the rivalry or face indefinite suspension from the sport. Their rivalry did not end until the 2012 Nationwide race at Watkins Glen, where the two rivals finished 1-2 and confirmed it in both their interviews.

Previous race: 2009 Subway Fresh Fit 500	Sprint Cup Series; 2009 season	Next race: 2009 Crown Royal 400
