= Charles Hoffman (politician) =

American politician

Member of the South Dakota House of Representatives from the 23rd district
- In office January 12, 2021 – present Serving with Spencer Gosch (2021-present)
- Preceded by: James Wangsness

Member of the South Dakota House of Representatives from the 23rd district
- In office January 2009 – January 2015 Serving with Justin Cronin (2009–2015)
- Preceded by: Justin Davis; Tom Hackl
- Succeeded by: Justin Cronin; Michele Harrison

Personal details
- Born: January 7, 1960 (age 66) Montclair, New Jersey
- Party: Republican
- Spouse: Holly Wanner (1985-2018)
- Children: Austin Hoffman (b. 1985); Alexandra Hoffman (b. 1987); Elizabeth Hoffman (b. 1990)
- Education: Northern State University; Yankton College

Charles B. Hoffman (born January 7, 1960) is an American politician and a Republican member of the South Dakota House of Representatives representing District 23 since January 12, 2021 and previously held the same seat from January 2009 to January 2015. During his second two-year term (2011–12), he served as the House's Majority Whip.

== Early life and education ==
Hoffman was born in Montclair, New Jersey. He attended Northern State University (NSU) and Yankton College. While at NSU, he met a fellow student named Holly Wanner. They got married in 1985, and together, they have three children: Austin (born 1985), a television journalist; Alex (born 1987), also a TV journalist and a former Miss South Dakota in the Miss America circuit; and Elizabeth (born 1990), also a former beauty queen. Hoffman and Holly divorced in 2018. Hoffman lives on a ranch outside Eureka, South Dakota.

== Election history ==
- 2020 Hoffman was elected with 6,791 votes and Spencer Gosch was re-elected with 8,325 votes;.

Gosch won the Republican primary election with 3,107 votes along with Charlie Hoffman who received 2,709 votes while James Wangsness received 1,072 votes and Kevin Watts received 755 votes.

- 2016 In the Republican primary, Hoffman was defeated by Spencer Gosch who received 2,135 votes and John Lake who received 2,466 votes while Hoffman received 1,706 votes and Dick Werner received 1,607 votes.
- 2012: Hoffman and Representative Justin Cronin were unopposed for both the June 5, 2012 Republican Primary and the November 6, 2012 General election, where Hoffman took the first seat with 6,831 votes (51.5%) and Representative Cronin took the second seat.
- 2010: Hoffman and Representative Cronin were unopposed for both the June 8, 2010 Republican Primary and the November 2, 2010 General election, where Representative Cronin took the first seat and Hoffman took the second seat with 4,812 votes (47.39%).
- 2008: When District 23 incumbent Republican Representative Tom Hackl ran for South Dakota Senate and Justin Davis left the Legislature leaving both District 23 seats open, Hoffman ran in the June 3, 2008 Republican Primary; in the five-way November 4, 2008 General election fellow Republican nominee Justin Cronin took the first seat and Hoffman took the second seat with 4,897 votes (32%) ahead of Democratic nominees Orland Geigle, Leonard Linde, and Independent candidate Wayne Schmidt.

== In media ==
Hoffman's then-wife Holly was a contestant on Survivor: Nicaragua in 2010. In the series' fourteenth episode, he appeared as a "loved one" for a reward challenge. Ultimately, the Hoffmans were one of the pairs chosen by Chase Rice, the challenge winner, to join him (and his mother) in partaking the reward.
