= Justin Cronin (politician) =

American politician (1980–2020)

Member of the South Dakota Senate from the 23rd district
- In office January 2017 – August 2019
- Preceded by: Corey Brown
- Succeeded by: John Lake

Member of the South Dakota House of Representatives from the 23rd district
- In office January 2009 – 2017
- Succeeded by: Spencer Gosch

Personal details
- Born: October 9, 1980 Sioux Falls, South Dakota
- Died: November 11, 2020 (aged 40) Pierre, South Dakota
- Party: Republican
- Education: University of St. Thomas

Justin R. Cronin (October 9, 1980 – November 11, 2020) was an American politician who served as a Republican member of the South Dakota House of Representatives from January 2009 to 2017 and the South Dakota State Senate from 2017 until his resignation in August 2019 for health reasons. Cronin won his uncontested seat for an additional term in 2016. He died at his home in Pierre, South Dakota at the age of 40.

== Education ==
Cronin earned his BA in business from the University of St. Thomas.

== Elections ==
- 2012 Cronin and Representative Charles Hoffman were unopposed for both the June 5, 2012 Republican Primary and the November 6, 2012 General election, where Representative Hoffman took the first seat and Cronin took the second seat with 6,441 (48.5%).
- 2008 When District 23 incumbent Republican Representative Tom Hackl ran for South Dakota Senate and Justin Davis left the Legislature leaving both District 23 seats open, Cronin ran in the June 3, 2008 Republican Primary; in the five-way November 4, 2008 General election Cronin took the first seat with 5,135 votes (33.54%) and fellow Republican nominee Charles Hoffman took the second seat ahead of Democratic nominees Orland Geigle, Leonard Linde, and Independent candidate Wayne Schmidt.
- 2010 Cronin and Representative Hoffman were unopposed for both the June 8, 2010 Republican Primary and the November 2, 2010 General election, where Cronin took the first seat with 5,343 votes (52.61%) and Representative Hoffman took the second seat.

== Session committees ==
Cronin was the vice-chair of the Government Operations and Audit Committee; a member of the Committee on Appropriations; and a member of the Joint Committee on Appropriations.
