= Countdown to the Crown =

- Also known as: Miss America: Countdown to the Crown
- Genre: Reality television
- Presented by: Tyler Harcott
- Country of origin: United States
- Original language: English
- No. of seasons: 1
- No. of episodes: 4

Production
- Executive producers: Shari Brooks; John Foy; Troy Searer

Original release
- Network: TLC
- Release: January 2 – January 23, 2009

Related
- Miss America

Miss America: Countdown to the Crown was a four-week-long reality series that followed the 52 Miss America contestants vying for the Miss America 2009 crown, hosted by Tyler Harcott. It aired on the TLC network, part of the Discovery Channel family of networks, to promote and generate interest in the Miss America pageant that would air after the series completion.

== Episodes ==
Episode Number	Title	Original Air Date	Golden Sash Winner
1	The Queen Meets the Crown	January 2, 2009	Miss Indiana, Katie Stam
2	Keep it in the Barn	January 9, 2009	Miss Georgia, Chasity Hardman
3	Dress for Success	January 16, 2009	Miss South Dakota, Alexandra Hoffman
4	Rock the Runway	January 23, 2009	Miss Alabama, Amanda Tapley

== Summary ==
During this reality series, viewers had the opportunity to vote for contestants to help them earn a spot in the top 15 prior to the live telecast, called the "Golden Sash". The contestants who earned a "Golden Sash" were Miss Indiana Katie Stam, Miss Georgia Chasity Hardman, Miss South Dakota Alexandra Hoffman, and Miss Alabama Amanda Tapley.

Ultimately in the Miss America 2009 pageant, Hoffman and Tapley did not go beyond the Top 15, but Stam and Hardman were named Miss America 2009 and first runner-up, respectively.
