= Senator Bull =

Senator Bull may refer to:

- Benjamin Bull (1798–1879), Wisconsin State Senate
- Hiram C. Bull (1820–1879), Wisconsin State Senate
- Melville Bull (1854–1909), Rhode Island State Senate
- Thomas Short Bull (born 1946), South Dakota State Senate
