= Nicholas Nemec =

American politician

Member of the South Dakota House of Representatives from the 23rd district
- In office January 12, 1993 – January 14, 1997
- Succeeded by: Jarvis Brown; Jay Duenwald

Personal details
- Born: September 19, 1958 (age 67) Pierre, South Dakota
- Party: Democratic

Nicholas Nemec (born September 19, 1958) is an American politician who served in the South Dakota House of Representatives from the 23rd district from 1993 to 1997.
