= KTVI =

Television station in St. Louis

- St. Louis, Missouri; United States
- Channels: Digital: 33 (UHF); Virtual: 2
- Branding: Fox 2

Programming
- Affiliations: 2.1: Fox; for others, see § Subchannels

Ownership
- Owner: Nexstar Media Group; (Tribune Broadcasting Company II LLC)
- Sister stations: KPLR-TV; Tegna: KSDK

History
- First air date: August 10, 1953
- Former call signs: WTVI (1953–1955)
- Former channel numbers: Analog: 54 (UHF, 1953–1955), 36 (UHF, 1955–1957), 2 (VHF, 1957–2009); Digital: 43 (UHF, until 2020)
- Former affiliations: CBS (1953–1954); ABC (secondary 1953–1954, primary 1954–1995); DuMont (secondary, 1953–1955)
- Call sign meaning: Television Illinois (station originally licensed to Belleville, Illinois)

Technical information
- Licensing authority: FCC
- Facility ID: 35693
- ERP: 1,000 kW
- HAAT: 336 m (1,102 ft)
- Transmitter coordinates: 38°32′7″N 90°22′23″W

Links
- Public license information: Public file; LMS
- Website: fox2now.com

KTVI (channel 2) is a television station in St. Louis, Missouri, United States, affiliated with the Fox network. It is owned by Nexstar Media Group alongside CW station KPLR-TV (channel 11); Nexstar's Tegna subsidiary owns NBC affiliate KSDK (channel 5). KTVI and KPLR-TV share studios on Ball Drive in Maryland Heights; KTVI's transmitter is located in Sappington, Missouri.

== History ==
=== As WTVI ===
The station first signed on the air by Signal Hill Telecasting Corporation on August 10, 1953, as WTVI, broadcasting on UHF channel 54. It was originally licensed to Belleville, Illinois (across the Mississippi River from St. Louis), and was the second television station in the St. Louis market after KSD-TV (channel 5, now KSDK) on February 8, 1947. The station's first broadcast was a baseball game between the St. Louis Browns and Cincinnati Reds, announced by Buddy Blattner, Bill Durney and Milo Hamilton. It operated as a primary CBS affiliate, and held secondary affiliations with ABC and DuMont. DuMont affiliation was agreed to in February 1953 to replace KSD-TV. The station was projected to sign on May 15, 1953. The station originally operated from studios located in Alton, Illinois. The CBS affiliation moved to KWK-TV (channel 4, now KMOV) when it debuted on July 8, 1954; more or less by default, WTVI became a primary ABC affiliate.

=== As KTVI ===
The station moved to UHF channel 36, and relocated its city of license to St. Louis on April 9, 1955, keeping the base "TVI" letters as part of its call sign while flipping the first assigned letter from "W" to "K" with this switch of sides of the Mississippi River, thus changing to KTVI. It moved its operations to facilities located in the Clayton-Tamm/Dogtown neighborhood in west St. Louis (off present-day I-64/US 40 at the intersection of Berthold, Oakland, and Hampton Avenues). However, the Federal Communications Commission (FCC) had recently changed its regulations so that the station could have kept its license in Belleville even while moving its main studio to St. Louis. The WTVI calls are currently used by a PBS member station in Charlotte, North Carolina.

The station lost DuMont programming when the network ceased operations in 1956, making KTVI an exclusive ABC affiliate. As the FCC would not require television sets to include UHF tuners until 1961, on April 15, 1957, KTVI moved to VHF channel 2, something it had attempted to do soon after moving to St. Louis–the channel 2 allocation had been reassigned from Springfield, Illinois, under pressure from the Truman administration, originally done so as not to interfere with CBS-owned WBBM-TV in Chicago.

For many years, the station was owned by the Newhouse newspaper chain, owners of the now-defunct St. Louis Globe-Democrat. In 1980, Newhouse exited from broadcasting, and sold KTVI and its other television outlets to the Los Angeles-based Times Mirror Company. In March 1993, in order for the company to concentrate on its newspaper and cable television system franchises, Times Mirror sold KTVI and its three sister stations—KTBC in Austin and KDFW-TV in Dallas–Fort Worth and WVTM-TV in Birmingham—to Argyle Television Holdings in a two-part deal for $335 million in cash and securities. Under the transaction's purchase option structure, WVTM and KTVI were the first two stations that Argyle sold to New World, which the latter purchased for a combined $80 million. (It would later respectively acquire KDFW and KTBC from the group for $335 million in cash and securities). The purchase of the entire group was completed in December of that year following securement of financing for the deal.

=== As a Fox station ===
==== New World Communications ownership ====
On May 23, 1994, as part of a $500-million overall deal in which network parent News Corporation also purchased a 20% equity interest in the group, New World signed a long-term affiliation agreement with Fox to switch twelve television stations—five that New World had already owned and seven that the company was in the process of acquiring through separate deals with Great American Communications and Argyle Television Holdings (which New World purchased one week later in a purchase option-structured deal for $717 million), including KTVI—to the network. The stations involved in the agreement—all of which were affiliated with one of the three major broadcast networks (CBS, ABC and NBC)—would become Fox affiliates once individual affiliation contracts with each of the stations' existing network partners had expired. The deal was motivated by the National Football League (NFL)'s awarding of the rights to the National Football Conference (NFC) television package to Fox on December 18, 1993, in which the conference's broadcast television rights moved to the network effective with the 1994 NFL season, ending a 38-year relationship with CBS.

ABC had a fourteen-month leeway to find a new affiliate in St. Louis, as its contract with KTVI did not expire until July 1, 1995. Of ABC's options, four prospects were automatically eliminated: KSDK was in the middle of a long-term affiliation agreement with NBC; KMOV was under a long-term agreement with CBS; and KNLC (channel 24) and WHSL (channel 46, now WRBU) were respectively owned by the locally based New Life Christian Church and the Home Shopping Network at the time, and both stations had inferior signals, even on cable, making either unlikely choices as even last-ditch options. This left independent station KPLR-TV (channel 11) and existing Fox station KDNL-TV (channel 30) as the only viable options with which ABC could reach an affiliation agreement. The network first approached KPLR about negotiating an affiliation deal, ultimately to be turned down by its then-owner Koplar Communications. On August 25, 1994, River City Broadcasting reached an agreement with ABC to shift the network's affiliation rights to KDNL.

KTVI switched to Fox on August 7, 1995, ending its relationship with ABC after 42 years; concurrently, ABC programming moved to KDNL-TV. The last ABC program to air on KTVI was an ABC Sunday Night Movie presentation of Survive the Savage Sea at 8 p.m. Central Time on August 6. As with most of the other New World-owned stations affected by the agreement with Fox, KTVI retained its longtime "Channel 2" branding upon the affiliation switch, with references to the Fox logo and name limited in most on-air imaging; it also retained the news branding it had been using before it joined the network—in its case, The 2 News Team, which the station adopted in November 1990 as an ABC affiliate. In addition to expanding its local news programming at the time it joined Fox, the station replaced ABC daytime and late-night programs that migrated to KDNL with an expanded slate of syndicated talk shows as well as some documentary-based reality series and off-network sitcoms, and also acquired some syndicated film packages and first-run and off-network syndicated drama series for broadcast in weekend afternoon timeslots on weeks when Fox did not provide sports programming.

==== News Corporation/Fox ownership ====
On July 17, 1996, News Corporation announced that it would acquire New World in an all-stock transaction worth $2.48 billion, with the latter company's ten Fox affiliates being folded into the former's Fox Television Stations subsidiary, making them all owned-and-operated stations of the network; upon the completion of the merger on January 22, 1997, KTVI became the first network-owned station in the St. Louis market since CBS sold KMOX-TV (which became KMOV) to Viacom in 1986. Under Fox ownership, programming began to change very slightly as KTVI (through Fox) began to add stronger first-run syndicated shows as well as stronger off-network sitcoms to the programming mix.

KTVI first launched its website on November 1, 1999, which featured a design similar to other sites belonging to Fox's owned-and-operated stations at the time and focused on promotional and programming content initially, but eventually incorporated news content. The website was migrated to the MyFox platform on September 14, 2006. On October 15, 2007, KTVI launched STLMoms.com, a website aimed at St. Louis area mothers, whose concept spun off from a popular blog featured on the station's main website. Subsequently, on June 2, 2008, KTVI launched GarageSaleSTL.com, a free website that primarily features a Google-based map of viewer-submitted garage sales (the site has since been discontinued).

==== Local TV and Tribune ownership ====
On December 22, 2007, Fox sold KTVI and seven other owned-and-operated stations—WDAF-TV in Kansas City, WBRC in Birmingham, WGHP in Greensboro–Winston-Salem–High Point, WJW in Cleveland, WITI in Milwaukee, KDVR in Denver and KSTU in Salt Lake City—to Local TV (a broadcast holding company operated by private equity firm Oak Hill Capital Partners that was formed on May 7 of that year to assume ownership of the broadcasting division of The New York Times Company) for $1.1 billion; the sale was finalized on July 14, 2008. On February 1, 2012, WJW redesigned its web site under the new WordPress-hosted design implemented months earlier by sister stations WDAF and WITI, replacing the site design previously used for the Local TV stations that was developed by Tribune Interactive (now Tribune Digital). On July 1, 2013, the Tribune Company (which in 2008, had formed a joint management agreement involving its Tribune Broadcasting subsidiary and Local TV to operate stations owned by both companies and provide web hosting, technical and engineering services to those run by the latter group) acquired the Local TV stations for $2.75 billion; the sale was completed on December 27.

On September 17, 2008, Local TV LLC entered into a local marketing agreement with Tribune Broadcasting, under which it assumed some operational responsibilities for CW affiliate KPLR-TV. The agreement, which took effect on October 1, allowed KTVI to provide advertising and promotional services as well as news operations for KPLR, while Tribune would retain responsibilities over channel 11's programming (although both stations would share certain syndicated programs), master control and production services. The LMA resulted from the formation of a "broadcast management company" that was created to provide management services to stations owned by both Tribune and Local TV. Although it was the senior partner in the agreement, KTVI vacated its longtime studios in the Clayton-Tamm/Dogtown neighborhood on St. Louis' west side and moved its operations to KPLR's facility in Maryland Heights (KPLR moved to that building, the larger of the two facilities, in 2003; whereas KTVI had been operating from the Berthold studios for nearly 50 years).

On July 1, 2013, Tribune acquired KTVI and Local TV's eighteen other television stations outright for $2.75 billion; the sale received FCC approval on December 20, and was completed on December 27, creating the first legal station duopoly in the St. Louis market between KTVI and KPLR. As FCC rules prohibited the common ownership of two of the four highest-rated television stations in the same market, Tribune's direct purchase of KTVI to form a duopoly with KPLR was permissible because KPLR ranked in fifth place in total day ratings at the time of the purchase. (In recent years, KPLR and KDNL—which ranked fourth in the ratings at that time—have rotated between fourth and fifth place in total day viewership due to the weaker viewership of KDNL's programming since its news department was shut down by owner Sinclair Broadcast Group in 2001); St. Louis also has only nine full-power television stations, seven of which are commercial outlets, making this the only legal duopoly allowable in the market under FCC rules.

=== Aborted sale to Sinclair; sale to Nexstar ===
Sinclair—which has owned KDNL-TV since the group's 1996 acquisition of River City Broadcasting—entered into an agreement to acquire Tribune Media on May 8, 2017, for $3.9 billion, plus the assumption of $2.7 billion in Tribune debt. Prohibited from owning all three stations, Sinclair would have been required to sell KPLR to a third party to comply with ownership rules and alleviate potential antitrust issues. The deal received significant scrutiny over Sinclair's forthrightness in its applications to sell certain conflict properties, prompting the FCC to designate it for hearing and leading Tribune to terminate the deal and sue Sinclair for breach of contract.

Following the Sinclair deal's collapse, Nexstar Media Group of Irving, Texas, announced its purchase of Tribune Media on December 3, 2018, for $6.4 billion in cash and debt. The sale was completed on September 19, 2019.

In August 2025, Nexstar agreed to acquire KSDK owner Tegna for $6.2 billion. The deal was completed on March 19, 2026, and included approval for Nexstar to own three full-power station licenses in markets such as St. Louis. A temporary restraining order issued one week later by the U.S. District Court for the Eastern District of California, later escalated to a preliminary injunction, has prevented Nexstar from integrating the stations.

== Programming ==
KTVI currently carries the majority of the Fox network schedule; however, it delays the network's Saturday late night block (currently, as of September 2016, consisting of reruns of Fox prime time reality series) by a half-hour in order to air its 10 p.m. newscast. The station may preempt some Fox programs in order to air long-form breaking news or severe weather coverage, although live sports events may require such coverage to air simultaneously with the scheduled Fox Sports telecast. Fox prime time shows preempted or otherwise interrupted by such content may either be rebroadcast on tape delay over KTVI's main channel in place of syndicated programs normally shown during overnight timeslots. Station personnel also gives viewers who subscribe to AT&T U-verse, DirecTV, Dish Network and other pay television providers within the KTVI viewing area the option of watching the affected shows on the Fox Now streaming platforms or its cable/satellite video-on-demand service the day after their initial airing.

The only two notable program preemptions that KTVI made as a Fox affiliate—outside of those necessitated by extended breaking news or severe weather coverage, special programming, or other scheduling conflicts—have been the brief one of the Fox Kids block and that of the secondary Sunday morning NFL pre-game show Fox NFL Kickoff, of which KTVI had declined carriage for the 2015 regular season (the program moved to Fox from Fox Sports 1 in September 2015), with the station's second digital subchannel airing it instead in its network-recommended time slot; KTVI began clearing Fox NFL Kickoff in September 2016.

=== Fox children's programming ===
Unlike most of its sister stations under its former New World ownership, KTVI has carried Fox's children's programming. Upon joining the network in August 1995, it opted not to run the Fox Kids weekday afternoon and Saturday morning blocks, instead airing children's programs acquired via syndication on weekend mornings (the preemptions of Fox Kids by the New World stations led the network to change its carriage policies to allow Fox stations uninterested in carrying the block the right of first refusal to transfer the local rights to another station; by 2001, affiliates were no longer required to run the Fox Kids lineup even if Fox had not secured a substitute carrier). Fox Kids originally wanted to be broadcast locally on KPLR, but the offer was turned down by that station's then-owner Koplar Communications, because Koplar felt that "they had a strong slate of children's programming and no room for the Rangers". Fox Kids subsequently went unseen in the market, and representatives of the block faced the possibility of piping in KSMO-TV in Kansas City (which aired Fox Kids because WDAF-TV declined carriage of the block) for cable subscribers until September, when Fox Kids arranged for its programming to be aired locally on religious independent KNLC. KNLC then drew the ire of the network by asking children to write to Missouri governor Mel Carnahan to protest the planned execution of Johnny Lee Wilson, then in prison for the 1986 murder of 79-year-old Aurora resident Pauline Martz (Carnahan pardoned Wilson that same month); additionally, KNLC's poor signal—both over the air and on cable—angered members of the largest Fox Kids Club in the nation. As a result, Fox Kids moved to KTVI in 1996.

KTVI stopped carrying the Fox Kids weekday block in 1998, although the station retained its Saturday morning lineup via negotiations, although KTVI had to cut to two hours of educational-and-informational programming before cutting back to Fox Kids (this was despite the fact that Fox gave its affiliates the option to push the weekday block to an earlier afternoon timeslot at that period). Fox discontinued its weekday block nationwide on December 31, 2001, while the Saturday lineup was contracted out to 4Kids Entertainment and relaunched as FoxBox on September 14, 2002. In September 2006, KTVI aired the block (by then, renamed 4Kids TV) two hours earlier than most carrier stations to accommodate the station's Saturday morning newscast. Fox ended its network-supplied children's programming on December 28, 2008, replacing it thereafter with the paid programming block Weekend Marketplace. On September 13, 2014, KTVI began carrying Xploration Station, a live-action educational program block distributed by Steve Rotfeld Productions that is syndicated primarily to Fox stations, on Saturday mornings through an agreement involving Tribune's Fox-affiliated stations.

=== Sports programming ===
KTVI became the official "home" station of the St. Louis Rams—which had relocated to the city from Los Angeles in 1995 (with the exception of select prime time telecasts on Thursday, Sunday and Monday nights, KTVI broadcast most of the NFL franchise's road games as well as most home games against other NFC teams). The station served as the local broadcaster for the Rams' appearance in Super Bowl XXXVI. KTVI's status as the team's primary station ended after the 2015 season, as a consequence of NFL team owners voting to approve the Rams' relocation back to Los Angeles effective with the 2016 NFL season, 30–2.

Since 1996, channel 2 also airs any St. Louis Cardinals games that are broadcast via Fox's broadcast contract with Major League Baseball; this included the team's World Series victories in 2006 and 2011, and its appearances in the 2004 and 2013 World Series.

=== News operation ===
KTVI presently broadcasts 68 hours of locally produced newscasts each week (with 11½ hours each weekday and 5½ hours on Saturdays, and 5 hours on Sundays); in regards to the number of hours devoted to news programming, it is the highest local newscast output among St. Louis's broadcast television stations. KTVI's Sunday 5 p.m. newscast is subject to preemption due to network sports coverage, as is standard with Fox stations that carry early evening weekend newscasts (though the Saturday 5 p.m. newscast is usually delayed to 6 p.m. due to baseball or college football coverage).

==== News department history ====
As an ABC affiliate, KTVI's newscasts usually placed third in the ratings, behind longtime leader KSDK and KMOV. However, for most of the 1980s and early 1990s, the station fought a spirited battle with KMOX-TV/KMOV for second place. Since 2009, the station's weekday morning newscast has placed first among the newscasts in the St. Louis market during that time period. One of the mainstay evening segments is "You Paid For It" (an investigative segment reported by Elliott Davis that uncovers city government tax abuse; the segment ends by giving the phone number of the office of that municipality's mayor, followed by the signoff "Call and speak your mind: after all, you paid for it").

After joining Fox in August 1995, KTVI increased its news programming output from roughly 30 hours a week to nearly 45 hours. It initially retained a news schedule similar to what it had as an ABC affiliate. All of its existing newscasts were retained, but it expanded its weekday morning newscast from one to three hours (with two hours added from 7 to 9 a.m.), and bridged the weeknight 5 and 6 p.m. newscasts into a 90-minute early evening news block (by adding a half-hour newscast at 5:30 to compensate for Fox's lack of a national news program). However, like its Austin sister station KTBC did during its first four years as a Fox station, KTVI did not initially add a prime time newscast at 9 p.m. upon switching to the network to compensate for Fox's lack of prime time network programming during that hour; instead, it filled the slot with syndicated programming from the August 1995 switch until September 1997, when it debuted a half-hour 9 p.m. newscast; it continued to air syndicated shows during the 9:30 half-hour until the prime time newscast expanded to one hour in September 1999, now leading directly into the 10 p.m. newscast (KTVI is one of several Fox stations that offer newscasts in both the final hour of prime time and the traditional late news timeslot, one of the few affiliated with the network that runs a nightly 10 p.m. (or 11 p.m.) newscast and one of the few to continue its Big Three-era 10 p.m. newscast after switching to Fox).

In addition to compensating for the absence of daily national newscasts on Fox's schedule, the expansion of KTVI's news schedule also served to fill timeslots vacated by the departures of Good Morning America and World News Tonight through its discontinuance of the ABC affiliation. KTVI is able to emphasize a broad array of stories from national and local reports, to investigative stories because of its large news programming output. The station also devotes a sizeable portion of its sports coverage to local high school sports (once partnering with the St. Louis Post-Dispatch to produce the now-canceled Prep Sports Show on Saturdays) and was the home of Jeff Fisher's weekly St. Louis Rams review show on Mondays.

For much of the time since it affiliated with Fox until the LMA began, KTVI's 9 p.m. newscast had beaten KPLR-TV's own prime time news program in that timeslot. Before Dick Ford retired from the station in December 2005, all four of KTVI's main male anchors (Ford, Tom O'Neal, Dan Gray and John Pertzborn) formerly served as anchors at KSDK. On April 10, 2006, KTVI debuted a new standardized graphics package, logo and news theme ("Fox Affiliate News Theme" by OSI Music) that was used by Fox's other owned-and-operated stations and select affiliates, during that evening's 9 p.m. newscast. A new set and weather center (replacing one built in 1998) was also introduced (the old news desk was donated to Southern Illinois University Carbondale, with the old weather center donated to the University of Missouri–St. Louis). In December 2008, KPLR temporarily relocated its newscasts to KTVI's now-former Clayton-Tamm/Dogtown studios as KPLR's facility was being remodeled to accommodate both KPLR and KTVI's newscasts; KTVI moved production of its newscasts to a temporary set in January 2009, in order for crews dismantle and move the station's existing news set to KPLR's Maryland Heights facility.

On February 15, 2009, KTVI began broadcasting local newscasts in high definition from its new Maryland Heights studio, accompanied by a new graphics package. The set was updated with several elements added to better fit the new graphics and due to the conversion to HD, while removing the city skyline backdrop in favor of a blue background. In January 2010, KTVI expanded its weekday morning newscast to six hours from 4 to 10 a.m. (despite the expansion, the station retained its 11 a.m. newscast). On December 23, 2011, KTVI/KPLR opened a news bureau in the newly renovated Peabody Opera House in downtown St. Louis, to better serve the downtown and eastern portion of the St. Louis metropolitan area.

On January 28, 2015, both stations introduced a new combined set with LED lighting, two video walls (one replacing the weather green screen), and a new anchor desk. Both stations shared the set (but KPLR used a separate weather center). They also introduced new graphics and music package for both stations the same day. KTVI became the first station in the Central Time Zone to launch an 11 p.m. weeknight newscast Hosted by Shirley Washington and Jasmine Huda (formerly of KMOV) the show debuted on January 18, 2016.

In mid-2019, both stations introduced The Power of Two: Midday, replacing Fox 2 News Midday and News 11 at Noon. The program is aired live at 11 a.m. on KTVI and KPLR.

On January 30, 2020, both stations introduced a new graphics package and music package for each station. The music, titled "Beyond", was created by Stephen Arnold Music, and is largely used by Fox affiliates.

In spring 2020, both stations introduced The Power of Two at 6 am, which is simulcast on KTVI and KPLR. While branded for both stations, it is largely targeted towards the KTVI audience, as it is part of Fox 2 News in The Morning.

In February 2021, both stations overhauled their set again with an expansion of the physical studio space with multiple venues and a larger video wall. KPLR no longer has a separate weather center, now just appearing on the same set as KTVI.

==== Notable current on-air staff ====
- Martin Kilcoyne – sports director
- Caroline Pettey – reporter and part-time news anchor

==== Notable former on-air staff ====
- Nancy Cozean
- Dana King – anchor
- Don Lemon – anchor/reporter
- Russ Mitchell – reporter
- Paul Moyer – anchor/reporter
- Lisa Sylvester – anchor

== Technical information ==
=== Subchannels ===
The station's digital signal is multiplexed:

Subchannels of KTVI
Subchannel	Res.	Short name	Programming
2.1	720p	KTVI-DT	Fox
2.2	480i	ANTENNA	Antenna TV
2.3	480i	GRIT	Grit
2.4	480i	SHOP	Shop LC
11.1	720p	KPLR-DT	The CW (KPLR-TV)

Broadcast on behalf of another station

KTVI began carrying Antenna TV upon its launch on January 1, 2011, on digital subchannel 2.2.

=== Analog-to-digital conversion ===
KTVI shut down its analog signal, over VHF channel 2, on June 12, 2009, the official date on which full-power television stations in the United States transitioned from analog to digital broadcasts under federal mandate. The station's digital signal continued to broadcast on its pre-transition UHF channel 43, using virtual channel 2.

As part of the repacking process following the 2016-2017 FCC incentive auction, KTVI relocated to UHF channel 33 in 2020.
