= Miss South Dakota Teen USA =

Beauty pageant competition

- Formation: 1983
- Type: Beauty pageant
- Headquarters: West Des Moines
- Location: Iowa
- Members: Miss Teen USA
- Official language: English
- Website: Official website

The Miss South Dakota Teen USA competition is the pageant that selects the representative for the state of South Dakota in the Miss Teen USA pageant.

South Dakota's highest placement was in 1986 when Valerie Marsden placed 4th runner-up to Allison Brown of Oklahoma. Their most recent placement was in 2024, when Olivia Odenbrett placed in the top 20.

Seven Miss South Dakota Teen USA titleholders have won the Miss South Dakota USA pageant and competed at Miss USA.

The pageant was first held in 1982 to select a winner to represent the state at Miss Teen USA 1983. It has been directed by KPC Productions since 2025 and is a subsidiary of the Miss Universe Organization. It has been held in Sioux Falls, Aberdeen, Rapid City, Pierre, Brookings, Brandon, Watertown, and Des Moines.

The current titleholder, Jasmine Jerke of Sioux Falls was crowned on May 30, 2026 at the Franklin Center in Des Moines. She represented South Dakota at the Miss Teen USA 2026 pageant.

== Results summary ==
=== Placements ===
- 4th runners-up: Valerie Marsden (1986)
- Top 10: Lisa Williamson (1989)
- Top 15: Makenzie Falcon (2016)
- Top 20: Olivia Odenbrett (2024)

South Dakota holds a record of 4 placements at Miss Teen USA.

=== Awards ===
- Miss Congeniality: Jasmine Jerke (2026)

== Winners ==
- Declared as Winner
- Ended as runner-up
- Ended as one of the finalists or semifinalists

Year	Name	Hometown	Age^{1}	Local title	Placement at Miss Teen USA	Special awards at Miss Teen USA	Notes
2026	Jasmine Jerke	Sioux Falls	17			Miss Congeniality	
2025	Bella Puetz	Sioux Falls	19	Miss Sioux Falls Teen			
2024	Olivia Odenbrett	Brandon	17	Miss Brandon Teen	Top 20		Previously Miss South Dakota's Outstanding Teen 2022
2023	Lindsey Pfingston	Rapid City	18	Miss Mount Rushmore Teen			
2022	Isabella Welker	Harrisburg	18	Miss Sioux Falls Teen			
2021	Katie Schmit	Artesian	18	Miss Artesian Teen			
2020	Izabel Kreger	Canton	17				
2019	Shelby Specht	Sioux Falls	17				
2018	Shania Knutson	Viborg	17				Later Miss South Dakota USA 2022
2017	Delaney Rupp	Sioux Falls	18				Sister of Miss South Dakota Teen USA 2013
2016	Makenzie Falcon	Aberdeen	18		Top 15		Later 2nd runner-up at Miss South Dakota USA 2018
2015	Marley Hanson	Vermillion	17				Later 4th runner-up at Miss South Dakota 2016; Later 3rd runner-up at Miss South Dakota USA 2017
2014	Madison McKeown	Brandon	18				Later Miss South Dakota USA 2016; Top 10 at Miss USA 2016
2013	Alexis Rupp	Sioux Falls	18				Sister of Miss South Dakota Teen USA 2017, later 1st runner-up at Miss South Dakota USA 2017
2012	Kalani Jorgensen	Sioux Falls	17				Later Miss South Dakota USA 2020
2011	Lexy Schenk	Irene	17				Later Miss South Dakota USA 2015
2010	Alyssa Hustrulid	Beresford	15				Later 2nd runner-up at Miss South Dakota USA 2016; Later 2nd runner-up at Miss South Dakota USA 2017; Later 1st runner-up at Miss South Dakota USA 2019; Later 3rd runner-up at Miss Nebraska USA 2019
2009	Fallyn Patterson	Rapid City	17				Later 1st runner-up at Miss South Dakota USA 2011; Later 2nd runner-up at Miss South Dakota USA 2015
2008	Elizabeth Hoffman	Eureka	16				Sister of Miss South Dakota Teen USA 2006
2007	Kari Schull	Watertown	17				Sister of Miss South Dakota Teen USA 2004
2006	Alexandra Hoffman	Eureka	18				Later Miss South Dakota 2008; Top 15 at Miss America 2009; Sister of Miss South Dakota Teen USA 2008
2005	Amanda DeCurtins	Ramona	18				
2004	Katie Schull	Watertown	17				Sister of Miss South Dakota Teen USA 2007
2003	Nicole Cuppy	Harrold	17				
2002	Jessica Fjerstad	Madison	17				Later Miss South Dakota USA 2005
2001	Jessica Herrgott	Mitchell	17				
2000	Nichole Brockhoft	Winner	16				
1999	Alexia Bonte	Beresford	16				
1998	Summer Simunek	Hot Springs	16				
1997	Juli Keech	Hill City	17				Crowned Miss Hospitality several years in a row. Later signed with L A Models and Wilhelmina model agency as a model/actress
1996	Tatewin Means	Rapid City	19				Daughter of activist Russell Means
1995	Marty Eaton	Belle Fourche	17				
1994	Autumn McKinley	Midland	17				
1993	Amy Rahlf	Clear Lake	18				
1992	Brandie Bower	Rapid City	17				
1991	Tabitha Mauck	Mobridge	17				Later Miss South Dakota USA 1994
1990	Petrona Usera	Rapid City	18				
1989	Lisa Williamson	Rapid City	17		Semi-finalist		
1988	Jillayne Fossum	Canton	17				Later Miss South Dakota USA 1991
1987	Camille Varland	Keldron	16				
1986	Valerie Marsden	Rapid City	17		4th runner-up		Mother of Miss South Dakota 2024 Joelle Simpson
1985	Sarah Burggraf	Sioux Falls	15				
1984	Kim Strom	Brandon	16				
1983	Karen Hernes	Pierpont	17				

^{1} Age at the time of the Miss Teen USA pageant
