= Caroline Pettey =

American broadcast journalist

- Born: Alabama, U.S.
- Education: Auburn University
- Occupations: Broadcast journalist, television reporter
- Employer(s): KTVI (Fox 2), St. Louis
- Known for: Top 16 at Miss USA 2021
- Title: Miss South Dakota USA 2021

Caroline Pettey is an American broadcast journalist, television reporter, and beauty pageant titleholder who was crowned Miss South Dakota USA in 2021. Additionally, she placed in the Top 16 at Miss USA 2021. In 2024, she joined KTVI (Fox 2) in St. Louis as a television reporter and part-time news anchor. She reports 5–6 days a week in St. Louis.

== Early life and education ==
Pettey attended Auburn University, where she studied broadcast journalism. While enrolled at Auburn, she reported for a Women's National Basketball Association team.

== Broadcasting career ==
Before joining Fox 2 in St. Louis, Pettey worked at local television news stations in Rapid City, South Dakota, including for FOX and ABC.

In 2024, Pettey joined KTVI (Fox 2) as a live reporter and part-time news anchor.

== Beauty pageants ==
Pettey won the Miss South Dakota USA 2021 title in April 2021, advancing to the Miss USA pageant later that year.

At Miss USA 2021, held in Tulsa, Oklahoma, she placed in the Top 16.

Awards and achievements
Preceded by Kalani Jorgensen	Miss South Dakota USA; 2021	Succeeded by Shania Knutson
