= Miss South Dakota =

Beauty pageant competition

- Formation: 1926
- Type: Beauty pageant
- Headquarters: Sioux Falls
- Location: South Dakota
- Members: Miss America
- Official language: English
- Website: Miss South Dakota official website

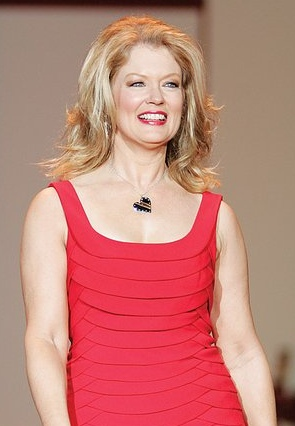
Mary Harum (Mary Hart), Miss South Dakota 1970

The Miss South Dakota competition is the pageant that selects the representative for the U.S. state of South Dakota in the Miss America pageant.

When Alaska won the Miss America 2022 title, South Dakota is one of the few states along with Maine, West Virginia and Wyoming that has yet to win a Miss America, Miss USA, or Miss Teen USA title.

Kianna Healy of Hartford was crowned Miss South Dakota on May 30, 2026, at the Oscar Larson Performing Arts Center on the campus of South Dakota State University in Brookings, South Dakota. She competed for the title of Miss America 2027 on September 6, 2026, at the Kravis Center for the Performing Arts in West Palm Beach, Florida.

== Results summary ==
The following is a visual summary of the past results of Miss South Dakota titleholders at the national Miss America pageants/competitions. The year in parentheses indicates the year of the national competition during which a placement and/or award was garnered, not the year attached to the contestant's state title.

=== Placements ===
- 1st runners-up: Irene O'Connor (1951)
- Top 10: Marlene Rieb (1952), Mary Harum (1971), Barbara Guthmiller (1975)
- Top 15: Alexandra Hoffman (2009)

=== Awards ===
==== Preliminary awards ====
- Preliminary Lifestyle and Fitness: Marlene Rieb (1952)
- Preliminary Talent: Irene O'Connor (1951), Delores Jerde (1954)

==== Non-finalist awards ====
- Non-finalist Talent: Delores Jerde (1954), Ann McKay (1969), Karen Janousek (1978), Julie Kleinsasser (1980), Sara Frankenstein (1999)

==== Other awards ====
- Dr. David B. Allman Medical Scholarship: Angela Casey (1994), Kimberlee McKay (1996)
- Social Impact Initiative Scholarship Award 2nd runners-up: Amber Hulse (2020)
- Women in Business Scholarship Award Winners: Carrie Wintle (2019)
- Women in STEM Finalists: Hunter Widvey (2023)

== Winners ==
- Declared as winner
- Ended as a runner-up
- Ended as a finalist or semi-finalist

Year	Name	Hometown	Age	Local Title	Miss America Talent	Placement at Miss America	Special scholarships at Miss America	Notes
2026	Kianna Healy	Hartford	23	Miss Sioux Falls	Vocal			Previously Miss South Dakota's Outstanding Teen 2021
2025	Jamee Katner	Huron	21	Miss Siouxland	Vocal			
2024	Joelle Simpson	Rapid City	20	Miss Rolling Plains	Harp, "Swan Lake Harp Cadenza"			Daughter of Miss South Dakota Teen USA 1986 Valerie Marsden
2023	Miranda O'Bryan	Martin	25	Miss Missouri River	Vocal, “Blank Space”			
2022	Hunter Widvey	Rapid City	23	Miss Huron	Vocal, "Feelin' Good"		Women in STEM Finalist	Previously Miss South Dakota's Outstanding Teen 2016
2021	Kaitlin O'Neill	Groton	24	Miss Dakota Plains	Contemporary Dance, "Bad Guy" by Eklipse			
2019–20 (Note: Titleholder extended to a second full year in 2020 after state and national pageants postponed to 2021 due to the COVID-19 pandemic)	Amber Hulse	Hot Springs	20	Miss State Fair	Piano		Social Impact Initiative Scholarship Award 2nd runner-up	Later Miss South Dakota USA 2023
2018	Carrie Wintle	Iroquois	23	Miss State Fair	Piano, "The Final Countdown"		Women in Business Scholarship Award	Previously Miss South Dakota's Outstanding Teen 2008
2017	Miranda Mack	Redfield	21	Miss South Dakota State University	Operatic Vocal, "Habanera" from Carmen			
2016	Julia Olson	Sioux Falls	23	Miss Missouri Valley	Vocal			Contestant at National Sweetheart 2015 pageant
2015	Autumn Simunek	Hot Springs	22	Miss Oahe	Vocal, "Glitter and Be Gay"			Previously Miss South Dakota's Outstanding Teen 2007 Contestant at National Sweetheart 2012 pageant
2014	Meridith Gould	Sioux Falls	19	Miss Lake Alvin	Lyrical Dance, "You Raise Me Up"			Previously Miss South Dakota's Outstanding Teen 2012 Later Miss Minnesota USA 2017; 2nd runner-up at Miss USA 2017 pageant
2013	Tessa Dee	Mitchell	22	Miss Gold Rush	Gymnastics Dance, "Bad"			Later Miss South Dakota USA 2017
2012	Calista Kirby	Brookings	23	Miss Rushmore	Tumbling, "Hot Honey Rag" from Chicago			
2011	Anna Simpson	Rapid City	21	Miss Rolling Plains	Piano, Theme from Pirates of the Caribbean			
2010	Loren Vaillancourt	Huron	20	Miss Hub City	Gymnastics/Dance, "Cinema Italiano" from Nine			
2009	Morgan Peck	Sioux Falls	20	Miss USD	Vocal, "My Simple Christmas Wish"			
2008	Alexandra Hoffman	Eureka	20	Miss South Dakota State University	Vocal, "Even Now"	Top 15		Sister of Miss South Dakota Teen USA 2008, Elizabeth Hoffman Previously Miss South Dakota Teen USA 2006 On Miss America: Countdown to the Crown, received a "Golden Sash" during the third episode, securing a spot in the Top 15
2007	Kate Wismer	Britton	22	Miss South Dakota State Fair	Classical Vocal, "The Doll Song" from The Tales of Hoffmann			
2006	Callee Bauman	Huron	21	Miss South Dakota State University	Vocal, "Journey to the Past"			
2005	Nikki Grandpre	Pierre	23	Miss Sioux Empire	Vocal, "Shy" from Once Upon a Mattress			Contestant at National Sweetheart 2003 pageant
2004	Kyra Korver	Mitchell	23	Miss Black Hills Gold	Classical Vocal, "Con te partirò"			
2003	Sara Seever	Custer	21	Miss Rushmore	Vocal / Dance, "The Music And the Mirror" from A Chorus Line			
2002	Vanessa Short Bull	Rapid City	23	Miss State Fair	Ballet en Pointe, "The Dying Swan"			Previously Miss South Dakota USA 2000
2001	Alecia Zuehlke	Britton	23	Miss Great Plains	Piano, "My Tribute" by Andraé Crouch			
2000	Nicole Nigg	Sisseton	24	Miss Western Plains	Vocal, "When I Look At You" from The Scarlet Pimpernel			
1999	Trisha Haroldson	Bruce	22	Miss Dakota Rose	Classical Vocal, "Adele's Laughing Song" from Die Fledermaus			
1998	Sara Frankenstein	Tulare	23	Miss Heartland	Vocal, "In His Eyes" from Jekyll & Hyde		Non-finalist Talent Award	
1997	Shantel Swedlund	Arlington	24	Miss State Fair	Alto Saxophone			Former chairwoman of the Miss America Organization Board of Directors
1996	Stephanie Camp	Rapid City	20	Miss State Fair	Vocal, "I Am Changing"			
1995	Kimberlee McKay	Belle Fourche	22	Miss University of South Dakota	Flute, "Carmen Fantasy"		Dr. David B. Allman Medical Scholarship	
1994	Kristi Bauer	Brookings	23	Miss State Fair	Interpretive Ballet			
1993	Angela Casey	Rapid City	24	Miss Rushmore	Popular Vocal		Dr. David B. Allman Medical Scholarship	
1992	Leslie Saunders	Dakota Dunes	21	Miss East River	Classical Vocal, "O Mio Fernando" from La favorite			
1991	Melissa Brown	Rapid City	22	Miss Rapid City	Vocal, "Crazy"			
1990	Jennifer Palmquist	Wilmot	21	Miss State Fair	Dramatic Monologue			
1989	Dawn Strunk	Irene	20	Miss Sioux Empire	Piano			
1988	Kathryn Barnes	Sioux Falls	22	Miss Sioux Falls	Vocal, "Miss Celie's Blues" from The Color Purple			
1987	Najla Ghazi	Brookings	19	Miss South Dakota State University	Oral Interpretations			
1986	Julie Hedin	Watertown	21	Miss South Dakota State University	Flute			
1985	Amy DeHeer	Hot Springs	21	Miss State Fair	Vocal, "Who Will Buy?" from Oliver!			
1984	Debra Cleveland	Madison	19	Miss State Fair	Classical Piano			
1983	LaRonda Lundin	Revillo	20	Miss South Dakota State University	Classical Piano, "Polichinelle" by Sergei Rachmaninoff			
1982	Tara Meyerink	Platte	19	Miss Mitchell	Classical Piano, "Beethoven's Sonata No. 6, Opus 10"			
1981	Pennisue Largent	Hot Springs	22	Miss Hot Springs	Vocal & Jazz Dance, "Misty"			
1980	Carol Barnett	Sioux Falls	18	Miss Sioux Falls	Vocal, "Money Tree"			selected as a Miss America USO Troupe member
1979	Julie Kleinsasser	Freeman	19	Miss State Fair	Popular Vocal, "Cry"		Non-finalist Talent Award	
1978	Jennifer Holt	Mitchell	20	Miss Mitchell	Vocal, "Spanish Rose"			Founder and lead singer of Tetes Noires band
1977	Karen Janousek	Rapid City	22	Miss Rapid City	Classical Piano, "Prelude in C Minor"		Non-finalist Talent Award	
1976	Beth Guthmiller	Tripp	21	Miss South Dakota State University/Brookings	Vocal, "My Tribute"			Younger sister of Miss South Dakota 1974, Barbara Guthmiller
1975	Gina Campbell	Canton	21	Miss University of South Dakota	Vocal, "Listen to a Country Song"			
1974	Barbara Guthmiller	Tripp	21	Miss Yankton College	Vocal, "Summertime"	Top 10		Older sister of Miss South Dakota 1976, Beth Guthmiller Contestant at National Sweetheart 1972 pageant
1973	Gwen Resick	Clark	20	Miss South Dakota State University	Dramatic Skit, "Aldonza" from Don Quixote			
1972	Janet Hunter	Madison	20	Miss Madison	Classical Piano, "Scherzo No. 3" by Chopin			
1971	Susan Inman	Hot Springs	19	Miss Hot Springs	Original Dramatic Skit, "Ecology"			Previously Miss South Dakota Teenager 1969 and top 8 in Miss American Teenager pageant
1970	Mary Harum	Sioux Falls	19	Miss Sioux Falls	Vocal Medley, "You've Made Me So Very Happy," "Something," & "Yesterday"	Top 10		Co-host of Entertainment Tonight
1969	Nancy Nickelson	Belle Fourche	20	Miss Black Hills State College	Folk Singing & Guitar, "If I Had Wings"			
1968	Ann McKay	Vermillion	21	Miss Lead-Deadwood	Dramatic Monologue from This Property Is Condemned		Non-finalist Talent Award	
1967	Sally Jo Iverson	Brandon	20	Miss Sioux Falls	Original Reading, "Tomorrow's Game"			
1966	Deborah Molitor	Vermillion	19	Miss University of South Dakota	Popular Vocal & Contemporary Dance			
1965	Nancy Sandwick	Sioux Falls	19	Miss Sioux Falls	Vocal Medley, "Wouldn't It Be Loverly" & "I Could Have Danced All Night" from My Fair Lady			
1964	June Ann Delbridge	Sioux Falls	19	Miss Sioux Falls	Piano			
1963	Heather Ann Paterson	Watertown		Miss Yankton College	Ballet, Soft-Shoe, & Charleston Dance			
1962	Charlean Fuhrman	Mansfield	19	Miss Northern State Teachers College	Vocal & Dramatic Act			
1961	Rejean Bowar	Faulkton	21	Miss South Dakota State College	Piano, Vocal, & Narration of Original Monologue			
1960	Janet Barber	Britton	18	Miss Britton	Dramatic Interpretation, "Casual Approach to Violence"			
1959	Meredith Auld	Yankton	18		Vocal			Later married news anchor, Tom Brokaw
1958	Carolee Nelson	Irene			Drama			
1957	Patricia Miller	Mobridge			Vocal			
1956	Lois Paulson	Mobridge			Vocal			
1955	Connie White	Canistota			Piano			
1954	Cleo Ann Harrington	Colman			Classical Vocal			
1953	Delores Jerde	Spearfish			Piano		Non-finalist Talent Award Preliminary Talent Award	
1952	Sandra Hart	Huron			Fire Baton Twirling			
1951	Marlene Rieb	Parkston			Baton Twirling	Top 10	Preliminary Swimsuit Award	
1950	Irene O'Connor	Burbank			Dramatic Monologue, "Dedication of the White Armor" from Saint Joan	1st runner-up	Preliminary Talent Award	
1949	Carol Quinn	Sioux Falls			Dramatic Monologue from Pygmalion			
1948	Myrna Clemenson	Conde						
1947	Roselyn Lea Anderson	Saint Onge			Piano, "'O Sole Mio"			
1935-1946	No South Dakota representative at Miss America pageants							
1934	No national pageant was held							
1933	No South Dakota representative at Miss America pageant							
1932	No national pageants were held							
1931	No national pageants were held							
1930	No national pageants were held							
1929	No national pageants were held							
1928	No national pageants were held							
1927	Ramona Pearl Sorensen	Lemmon	18					
1926	Mary Davis							
1925	No South Dakota representative at Miss America pageants							
1924	No South Dakota representative at Miss America pageants							
1923	No South Dakota representative at Miss America pageants							
1922	No South Dakota representative at Miss America pageants							
1921	No South Dakota representative at Miss America pageants							
