= Vanessa Short Bull =

Native American beauty pageant titleholder from South Dakota

- Born: December 30, 1978 (age 47); Pine Ridge, South Dakota, U.S.
- Citizenship: Oglala Sioux Tribe and American
- Beauty pageant titleholder
- Title: Miss South Dakota USA 2000, Miss South Dakota 2002
- Hair color: Brown
- Eye color: Brown
- Major competition: Miss South Dakota USA 2000 (winner) Miss South Dakota 2002 (winner)

Vanessa Short Bull (born December 30, 1978) is an American beauty pageant titleholder who served as both Miss South Dakota USA (2000) and Miss South Dakota (2002).

== Early life and education ==
Vanessa Short Bull was born in Pine Ridge, South Dakota to Thomas Short Bull, former state senator and president of Oglala Lakota College, and Darlene Short Bull. Short Bull is an Oglala Sioux Native American, a descendant of Oglala Lakota chief Red Cloud and Ghost Dance leader Arnold Short Bull.

Her family is from the Pine Ridge Reservation, although she has not lived there since she was six years old. She took ten years of ballet classes at New York City's Alvin Ailey American Dance Theater.

Short Bull graduated from the University of South Dakota.

== Pageantry ==
Short Bull was crowned Miss South Dakota USA in 2000. Short Bull was the first Native American to have the title of Miss South Dakota, winning the title in 2002.

== Personal life ==
Short Bull resides in Philadelphia, Pennsylvania.

== Sources ==
- bio of Short Bull
