= Corey Brown (politician) =

American politician (born 1974)

President pro tempore of the South Dakota Senate
- In office January 8, 2013 – January 3, 2015
- Preceded by: Bob Gray

Member of the South Dakota Senate from the 23rd district
- In office January 3, 2009 – January 7, 2017
- Preceded by: Jay Duenwald

Personal details
- Born: October 1, 1974 (age 51)
- Party: Republican
- Education: University of Notre Dame; University of San Diego

Corey William Brown (born October 1, 1974) is an American politician and a former Republican member of the South Dakota Senate representing District 23 from 2009 to 2017.

== Education ==
Brown earned his BA in government and international relations from the University of Notre Dame and his MA from the University of San Diego.

== State Senate Elections ==
- 2014 Brown was unopposed for both the June 3, 2014 Republican Primary and the November 4, 2014 General election, winning with 6,827 votes.
- 2012 Brown was unopposed for both the June 5, 2012 Republican Primary and the November 6, 2012 General election, winning with 8,029 votes.
- 2010 Brown was unopposed for both the June 8, 2010 Republican Primary and the November 2, 2010 General election, winning with 6,455 votes.
- 2008 When District 23 incumbent Republican Senator Jay Duenwald left the Legislature and left the seat open, Brown won the June 3, 2008 Republican Primary with 2,116 votes (59.79%) against state Representative Tom Hackl, and won the November 4, 2008 General election with 5,988 votes (64.06%) against Democratic nominee Nicholas Nemec.
