= Miss South Dakota USA =

Beauty pageant competition

- Formation: 1952
- Type: Beauty pageant
- Headquarters: West Des Moines
- Location: Iowa
- Members: Miss USA
- Official language: English
- Key people: Kelly McCoy
- Website: Official website

The Miss South Dakota USA competition is the pageant that selects the representative for the state of South Dakota in the Miss USA pageant. From 2002 until 2024, Minnesota-based Future Productions produced the pageant. In 2025, KPC Productions became the new production company for the pageant.

South Dakota has placed five times. One notable Miss South Dakota USA was Vanessa Short Bull (2000), one of the first Native Americans to compete at Miss USA. Short Bull was also Miss South Dakota 2002. South Dakota's best placement in the competition was Madison Nipe placing in the top five in 2018.

The current titleholder is Lexus Paulson of Sioux Falls who was crowned on May 30, 2026 at the Franklin Center in Des Moines. She will represent South Dakota at Miss USA 2026.

== Gallery of titleholders ==
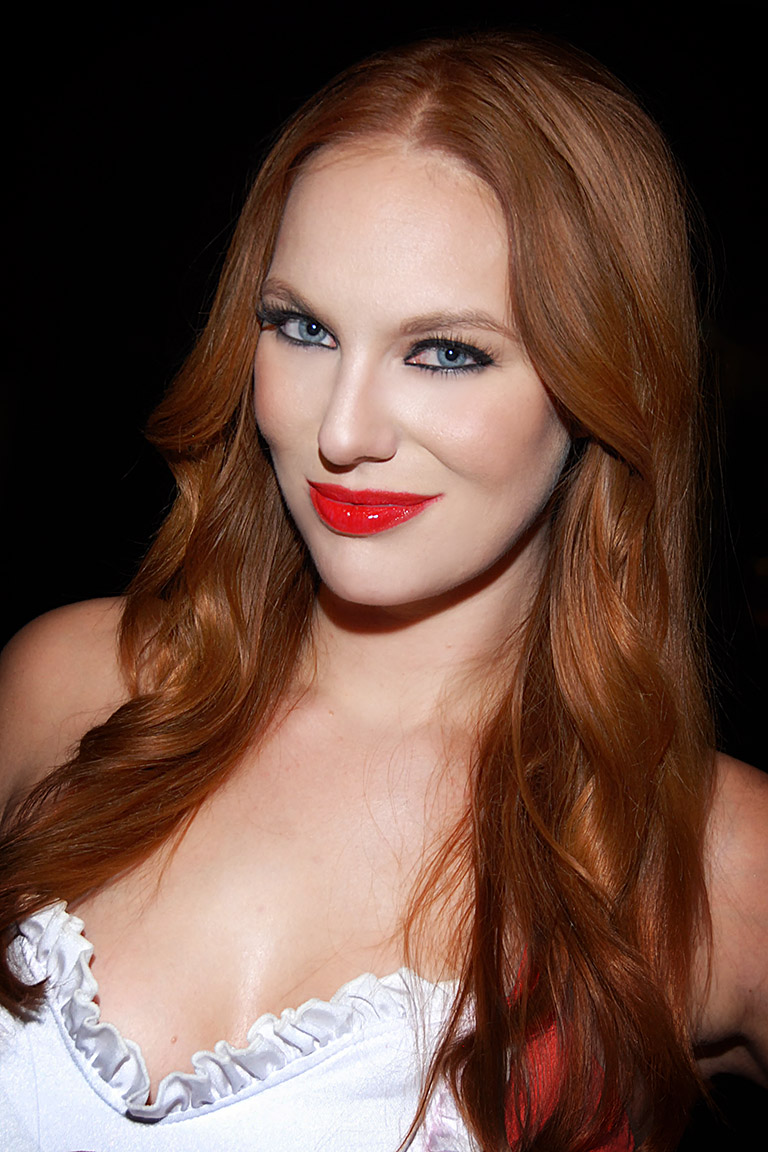
Jessica Albers, Miss South Dakota USA 2013 (pictured in 2015)

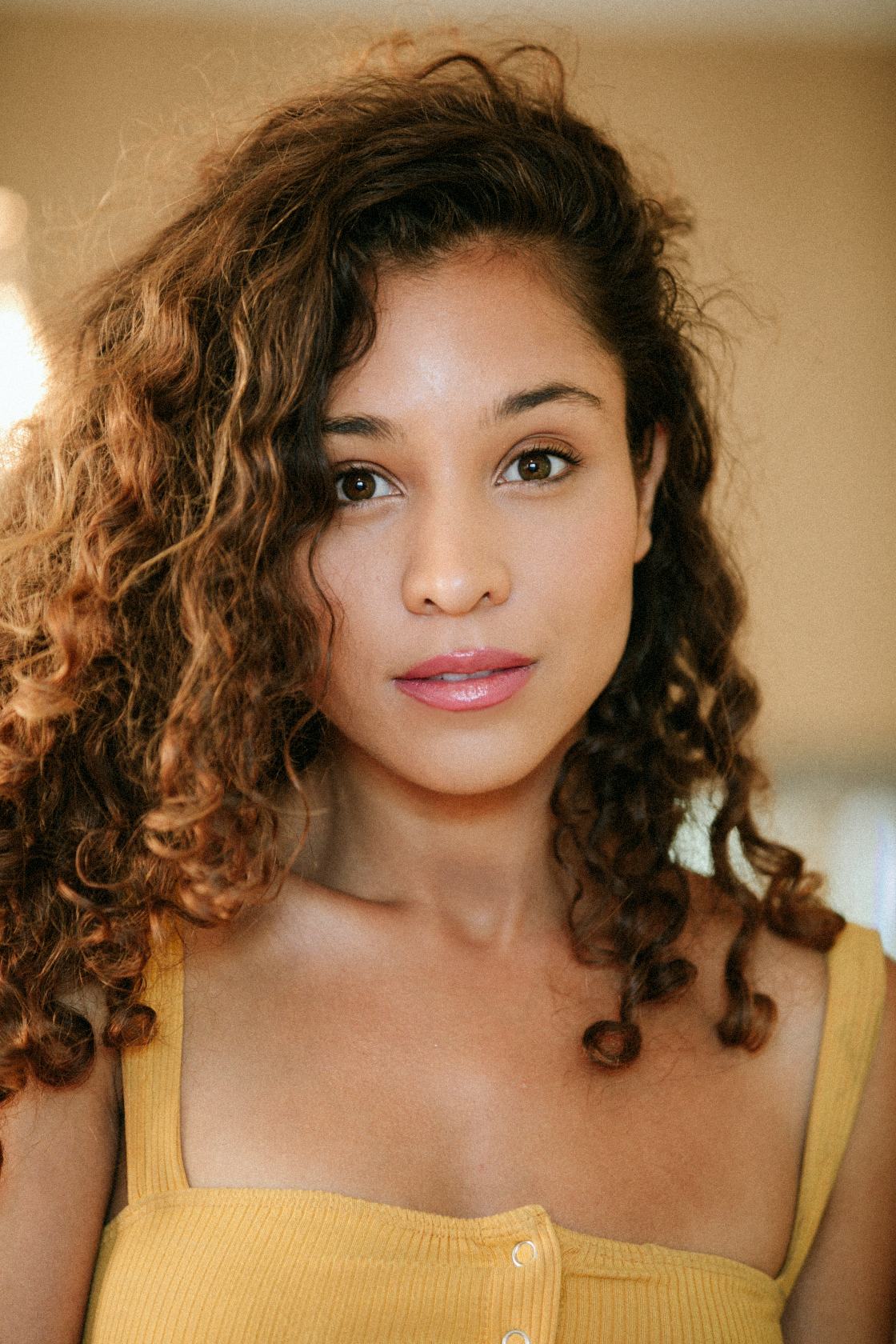
Charlie Buhler, Miss South Dakota 2008

== Results summary ==
- Top 5: Madison Nipe (2018)
- Top 10/12: Debra Ann Brickley (1974), Madison McKeown (2016)
- Top 15/16: Helen Youngquist (1958), Caroline Pettey (2021)

South Dakota holds a record of 5 placements at Miss USA.

== Winners ==
Color key

- Declared as Winner
- Ended as runner-up
- Ended as one of the finalists or semifinalists

Year	Name	Hometown	Age (Note: Age at the time of the crowning)	Local title	Placement at Miss USA	Special awards at Miss USA	Notes
2026	Lexus Paulson	Sioux Falls	28	Miss Southeast SD			
2025	Megan Hiykel	Brookings	20	Miss SDSU			
2024	Ahmitara Alwal	Sioux Falls	25	Miss Southern SD			
2023	Amber Hulse	Hot Springs	25	Miss Black Hills			Previously Miss South Dakota 2019-2020
2022	Shania Ann Knutson	Viborg	21	Miss Brookings County			Previously Miss South Dakota Teen USA 2018, later temporarily suspended from the title for pending charges of thefting
2021	Caroline Pettey	Rapid City	26	Miss Rapid City	Top 16		Previously Miss Alabama Teen United States 2013
2020	Kalani Jorgensen	Sioux Falls	25				Previously Miss South Dakota Teen USA 2012; Longest reigning Miss South Dakota USA at 1 year, 7 months and 3 days
2019	Abigail Mae Merschman	Sioux Falls	22				
2018	Madison Maricie Nipe	Madison	21		Top 5		
2017	Tessa Elizabeth Dee	Mitchell	25				Previously Miss South Dakota 2013
2016	Madison Marie McKeown	Sioux Falls	20		Top 10		Previously Miss South Dakota Teen USA 2014
2015	Lexy Kristine Schenk	Irene	20				Previously Miss South Dakota Teen USA 2011
2014	Brittney Palmer	Brookings	25				
2013	Jessica Albers	Yankton	26				
2012	Taylor Neisen	Rapid City	20				
2011	Chandra Rae Burnham	Highmore	23				
2010	Emily Anne Miller	Irene	21				
2009	Jessica Rowell	Sioux Falls	22				
2008	Charlie Buhler	Mitchell	19				
2007	Suzie Heffernan	Brookings	20				
2006	Alexis LeVan	Sioux Falls	19				Contestant at National Sweetheart 2008
2005	Jessica Lea Fjerstad	Madison	20				Previously Miss South Dakota Teen USA 2002
2004	Andrea Parliament	Brandon	20				
2003	Jessica Kate Lawrence	Brookings	25				Contestant at National Sweetheart 2001
2002	Sitania Sue Syrovatka	Sioux Falls					
2001	Beth Lovro	Sioux Falls					
2000	Vanessa Shortbull	Rapid City	21				Later Miss South Dakota 2002
1999	Shawna Gross	Huron	24				
1998	Lori O'Brien	Rapid City					
1997	Jamie Marie Swenson	Sioux Falls	25				
1996	Caresa Winters	Huron	20				
1995	Jenny Snobeck	Sioux Falls					
1994	Tabetha Mauck	Mobridge					Previously Miss South Dakota Teen USA 1991
1993	Kara Rovere	Sturgis					
1992	Shawn Christine Frerichs	Sioux Falls					
1991	Jillayne Fossum	Canton					Previously Miss South Dakota Teen USA 1988
1990	Valerie Sejnoha	Sioux Falls					
1989	Nanette Enders	Watertown					
1988	Sandi Lynn Fix	Sioux Falls	21				
1987	Jana Van Woudenberg	Canton	18				
1986	Lori Scumacher	Sioux Falls					
1985	Stacey Arnold	Rapid City	21				
1984	Donna Smith	Box Elder	20				
1983	Kelly Rosenbaum	Elk Point	19	Miss Clay County			
1982	Meaghen Marie North	Sioux Falls	19				
1981	Joan Abbott	Irene	19				
1980	Jane Schmidt	Flandreau	25				
1979	Noele de Saint Gall	Garretson	25				
1978	Nadene Oppold	Sioux Falls					
1977	Ginger Thomson	Sioux Falls					
1976	Dorothy Kay Westphal	Sioux Falls				Miss Congeniality (tie)	
1975	Lanette Rabenberg	Sioux Falls					
1974	Debra Ann Brickley	Sioux Falls			Semi-finalist		
1973	Rebecca Bunkers	Brookings					
1972	Kathleen "Kathey" Bakke	DeSmet					
1971	Sonia Hart	Sioux Falls					
1970	Cynthia Finley	Sturgis					
1969	Mary Catherine Bergen	Sioux Falls					
1968	Byrean Blacksmith	Sioux Falls					
1967	Patricia Marshall	Rapid City					
1962-1966	Did not compete						
1961	Sharon Hoffman						
1960	Patricia Ann Klith	Sioux Falls					
1959	Jeannine Kay Stratton	Sioux Falls	19				
1958	Helen Youngquist	Sioux Falls	20		Semi-finalist		
1957	Gay Marshall	Sioux Falls	19				
1956	Did not compete						
1955	Phyllis Elaine Choquette	Jefferson	19				
1954	Barbara Ann Brown	Sioux Falls	18				
1953	Kathleen Herman	Bowdle	18				
1952	Marlene Margaret Rieb	Parkston	20		withdrew		
