= Autumn Simunek =

American beauty pageant winner

- Born: 1992 or 1993 (age 33–34)
- Education: University of South Dakota
- Beauty pageant titleholder
- Title: National Miss Poppy 2005; Miss South Dakota's Outstanding Teen 2007; Miss Rapid City 2011; Miss Siouxland 2011; Miss Hot Springs 2013; Miss Siouxland 2013; Miss Oahe 2015; Miss South Dakota 2015
- Major competition: Miss America 2016

Autumn Simunek is an American beauty pageant titleholder from Hot Springs, South Dakota, who was named Miss South Dakota's Outstanding Teen 2007 and crowned Miss South Dakota 2015. She competed for the Miss America 2016 title in September 2015 and placed outside the Top 15.

== Pageant career ==
=== Early pageants ===
Simunek first began participating in the Miss America system when she was seven years old, serving as a Little Sister to Miss South Dakota contestant Kyra Korver at the June 2000 pageant.

When Simunek was 12 years old, she was chosen to represent South Dakota by her local American Legion Auxiliary unit and the South Dakota Department of the American Legion Auxiliary in recognition of her work promoting the ALA's remembrance poppy program. She was awarded the nationwide title of National Miss Poppy 2005 (junior division) in August 2005. Simunek earned $65 in combined prize money plus a chance to speak at the organization's national convention in Honolulu, Hawaii.

In June 2007, Simunek entered the Miss South Dakota pageant as one of 16 competitors seeking the title Miss South Dakota's Outstanding Teen 2007. She won the state title and represented South Dakota at the Miss America's Outstanding Teen 2008 pageant held in August 2007 in Orlando, Florida. She earned a $1,000 scholarship prize as well as a $1,000 wardrobe allowance to prepare her for the national competition. Simunek was not a Top-10 semi-finalist for the national crown.

=== Vying for Miss South Dakota ===
After several years off from competing, Simunek began competing as an adult by trying throughout late 2010 and early 2011 to qualify for the Miss South Dakota pageant. On February 5, 2011, Simunek beat out 40 other entrants to win the Miss Rapid City 2011 title. She competed in the 2011 Miss South Dakota pageant with the platform "Serving Those Who Served" and a show vocal performance in the talent portion of the competition. Simunek was named fourth runner-up to winner Anna Simpson.

In July 2011, Simunek won the Miss Siouxland 2011 title. She competed in the 2012 Miss South Dakota pageant with the platform "Serving Those Who Served: Everyone's Role" and performance of the aria "O mio babbino caro" from Gianni Schicchi by Giacomo Puccini in the talent portion of the competition. Simunek was named second runner-up to winner Calista Kirby. She was also awarded as the top fundraiser among the contestants for the Children's Miracle Network.

On January 26, 2013, Simunek won the Miss Hot Springs 2013 title. She competed in the 2013 Miss South Dakota pageant with the platform "5 Stars for Serving Those Who Served" and an operatic vocal performance in the talent portion of the competition. She was named second runner-up to winner Tessa Dee and earned a $1,300 scholarship prize. Simunek also earned $2,000 in scholarships as the winner of the pageant's Community Service Award and $500 as the Children's Miracle Network Miracle Maker Award winner.

On July 20, 2013, Simunek won the Miss Siouxland title for a second time. She competed in the 2014 Miss South Dakota pageant with the platform "5 Stars for Serving Those Who Served" and a Broadway-style vocal performance in the talent portion of the competition. She was named second runner-up to winner Meridith Gould and earned a $1,500 scholarship prize.

=== Miss South Dakota 2015 ===
On October 11, 2014, Simunek was crowned Miss Oahe 2015. She entered the Miss South Dakota pageant in June 2015 as one of 16 qualifiers for the state title. Simunek's competition talent was a classic pop vocal performance of "Hallelujah". Her platform is "5 Stars of Serving Those Who Served".

Simunek won the competition on Saturday, June 20, 2015, when she received her crown from outgoing Miss South Dakota titleholder Meridith Gould. Simunek is the second consecutive Miss South Dakota to have first won Miss South Dakota's Outstanding Teen. She earned more than $12,750 in scholarship money and other prizes from the state pageant. As Miss South Dakota, her activities include public appearances across the state of South Dakota.

=== Vying for Miss America 2016 ===
Simunek was South Dakota's representative at the Miss America 2016 pageant in Atlantic City, New Jersey, in September 2015. In the televised finale on September 13, 2015, she placed outside the Top 15 semi-finalists and was eliminated from competition. She was awarded a $3,000 scholarship prize as her state's representative.

== Early life and education ==
Simunek is a native of Hot Springs, South Dakota, and a 2011 graduate of Hot Springs High School. Her father is Kelly Simunek and her mother is Diane Simunek.

Simunek is a graduate of the University of South Dakota where she studied music education.

Awards and achievements
Preceded by Meridith Gould	Miss South Dakota; 2015	Succeeded by Julia Olson
