= Tom Hackl =

American politician

Member of the South Dakota House of Representatives from the 23rd district
- In office January 14, 2003 – January 13, 2009
- Preceded by: Jarvis Brown; Jay Duenwald
- Succeeded by: Justin Cronin; Charles Hoffman

Personal details
- Born: September 12, 1976 (age 50) Hoven, South Dakota
- Party: Republican

Tom Hackl (born September 12, 1976) is an American politician who served in the South Dakota House of Representatives from the 23rd district from 2003 to 2009.
