= Miss South Dakota's Teen =

- Formation: 2005
- Type: Beauty pageant
- Location: Hot Springs, South Dakota
- Members: Miss America's Teen
- Official language: English
- Website: Official website

The Miss South Dakota's Teen competition is the pageant that selects the representative for the U.S. state of South Dakota in the Miss America's Teen pageant.

Evian Johnson of Brookings was crowned Miss South Dakota's Teen on May 29, 2026, at the Oscar Larson Performing Arts Center on the campus of South Dakota State University in Brookings, South Dakota. She competed for the title of Miss America's Teen 2027 on September 5, 2026, at the Kravis Center for the Performing Arts in West Palm Beach, Florida.

== Results summary ==
The results of Miss South Dakota's Outstanding Teen as they participated in the national Miss America's Teen competition. The year in parentheses indicates the year of the Miss America's Teen competition the award/placement was garnered.

== Winners ==
Year	Name	Hometown	Age	Local title	Talent	Placement at MAO Teen	Special scholarships at MAO Teen	Notes
2026	Evian Johnson	Brookings	18	Miss Siouxland’s Teen	Dance			
2025	Taya Ritterbrush	Hot Springs	18	Miss State Fair's Teen	Vocal, "Se Tu M'Ami"			
2024	Briley Steffensen	Harrisburg	17	Miss Hub City's Teen	Musical Theater Dance			
2023	Nevaeh Kee	Faulkton	17	Miss Missouri River's Teen	Vocal			
2022	Olivia Odenbrett	Brandon	15	Miss Siouxland's Outstanding Teen	Contemporary/Lyrical Dance			Later crowned Miss South Dakota Teen USA 2024; Placed as finalist in the Top 20 at Miss Teen USA 2024
2021	Kianna Healy	Hartford	18	Miss Siouxland's Outstanding Teen	Musical Theater Vocal, "I'm a Star" by Scott Alan			Later Miss South Dakota 2026
2019-20	Payton Steffensen	Yankton	16	Miss Siouxland's Outstanding Teen	Acrobatic Musical Theatre Dance, "Call Me Back" from Women on the Verge of a Nervous Breakdown			2nd runner up to Miss South Dakota 2023
2018	Jessica Benson	Rapid City	17	Miss Hot Springs' Outstanding Teen	Vocal, "100 Easy Ways to Lose a Man" from Wonderful Town			
2017	Elizabeth Nesland	Rapid City	17	Miss Sioux Empire's Outstanding Teen	Electric Violin, "The Phantom of the Opera"			Miss Hub City 2022
2016	Hunter Widvey	Rapid City	17	Miss Rapid City's Outstanding Teen	Vocal, "Als Luise die Briefe" by Mozart			Later Miss South Dakota 2022
2015	Cameron Schroder	Huron	17	Miss Sioux Empire's Outstanding Teen	Vocal, "You Can't Get a Man with a Gun" from Annie Get Your Gun			
2014	Taylor Bird	Arlington	17	Miss Jack's Outstanding Teen	Vocal, "My Hallelujah Song"			
2013	Nina Mesteth	Rapid City	16	Miss State Fair's Outstanding Teen	Ballet en Pointe			Younger half-sister of Miss South Dakota's Outstanding Teen 2006, Aja Kessler
2012	Meridith Gould	Sioux Falls	17	Miss Siouxlands' Outstanding Teen	Dance			Later Miss South Dakota 2014 Later Miss Minnesota USA 2017; 2nd runner-up at Miss USA 2017 pageant
2011	Alexis Kosiak	Sioux Falls	16		Vocal/Guitar			
2010	Emma Thomas	Rapid City	16	Miss Rapid City's Outstanding Teen				
2009	Jessica Dyk	Rapid City		Miss Rapid City's Outstanding Teen	Lyrical/Pointe Dance			
2008	Carrie Wintle	Iroquois	14		Piano			Later Miss South Dakota 2018
2007	Autumn Simunek	Hot Springs	14		Ballet			Contestant at National Sweetheart 2012 pageant Later Miss South Dakota 2015
2007	Kelly Johnson	Sioux Falls	14			N/A		Abdicated
2006	Aja Kessler	Rapid City	17		Ballet en Pointe			Half-sister of Miss South Dakota's Outstanding Teen 2013, Nina Mesteth Contestant at National Sweetheart 2009 pageant 2nd runner-up at Miss South Dakota 2009 pageant
2005	Hailey Soyland	Madison	17		Vocal, "I Believe"			Currently a country singer who goes by the name Hailey Steele
