= Thomas Short Bull =

American politician

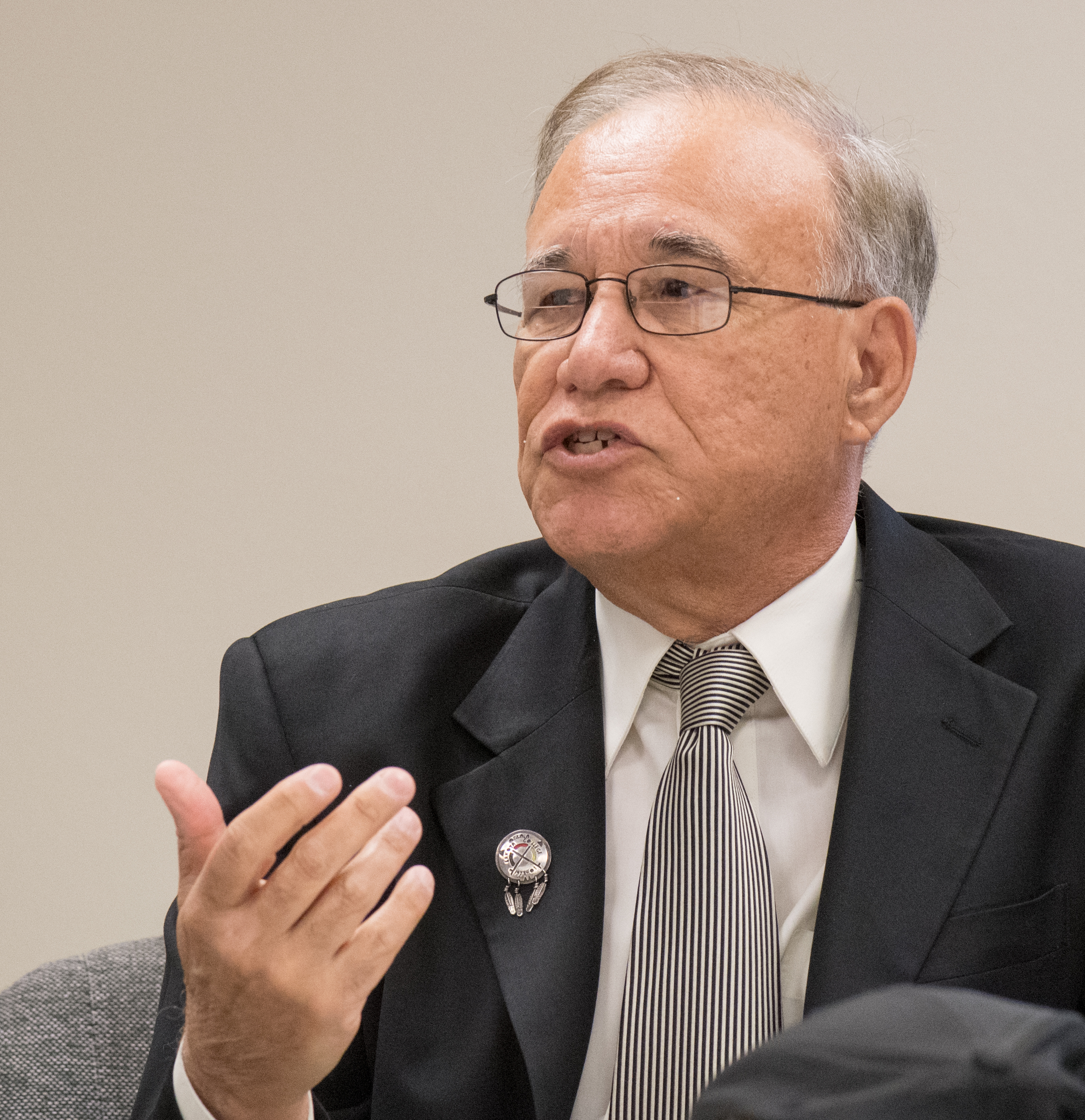

Member of the South Dakota Senate
- In office 1983–1988

Personal details
- Born: December 4, 1946 (age 79) Igloo, South Dakota
- Party: Democratic
- Spouse: Darlene
- Children: three, including Vanessa Short Bull
- Education: University of South Dakota
- Profession: College Instructor

Thomas E. Short Bull (born December 4, 1946) is an American former politician and former president of Oglala Lakota College. He served in the South Dakota Senate from 1983 to 1988. He is Oglala Lakota.

== Early life and education ==
Short Bull was born in Igloo, South Dakota, an army munitions depot. He is the oldest of 10 children.

He received a Bachelor of Science in Government from the University of South Dakota (USD) in 1970 and a Master of Public Administration from USD in 1973.

== Career ==
Short Bull served his first session as the president of Oglala Lakota College (OLC), then a community college, from 1975 to 1979.

In 1982, Short Bull was elected to the South Dakota Senate, the first Native American in the position. He was the first state senator to represent District 27, a district created in 1981 under the Voting Rights Act, which required South Dakota to draw a voting district with a majority of Native Americans.

In 1995, Short Bull began a second presidency at OLC, which received accreditation as a four-year university in 1983. During Short Bull's presidencies, OLC established a new library, historical center, housing units, and administrative headquarters building.

He retired on July 9, 2022.

== Awards ==
Short Bull was inducted into the South Dakota Hall of Fame in 2017 for his improvements of OLC.

== Personal life ==
Short Bull is married to Darlene Short Bull (née Janis). They have three children, Paul, Vanessa, and Frank.
