= Miss America 2009 =

82nd edition of the Miss America competition

- Date: January 24, 2009
- Presenters: Mario Lopez
- Venue: Planet Hollywood Performing Arts Center, Paradise, Nevada
- Broadcaster: TLC
- Entrants: 52
- Placements: 15
- Winner: Katie Stam; Indiana

Miss America 2009, the 82nd Miss America pageant, was held on the Las Vegas Strip in Paradise, Nevada on Saturday, January 24, 2009.

The pageant was broadcast live on TLC from the Theatre for the Performing Arts at the Planet Hollywood Resort and Casino, only the fourth time that the pageant has been held outside Atlantic City, New Jersey.

== Judges ==
The seven judges for the competition were:

- former model, Paige Adams-Geller
- actress and singer, Laura Bell Bundy
- Miss America 1999, Nicole Johnson
- Olympic swimmer, Cullen Jones
- casting director, Beth Klein
- hairstylist, Ken Pavés

== Results ==
=== Placements ===
Placement	Contestant
Miss America 2009	Indiana – Katie Stam *
1st Runner-Up	Georgia – Chasity Hardman *
2nd Runner-Up	Iowa – Olivia Myers
3rd Runner-Up	New York – Leigh-Taylor Smith
4th Runner-Up	Florida – Sierra Minott
Top 7	California – Jackie Geist; Tennessee – Ellen Carrington
Top 10	District of Columbia – Kate Grinold; Hawaii – Nicole Fox; Michigan – Ashlee Baracy
Top 12	Arkansas – Ashlen Batson; Kentucky – Emily Cox
Top 15	Alabama – Amanda Tapley *; Delaware – Galen Giaccone; South Dakota – Alexandra Hoffman *

* - America's Choice chosen from TLC show, Miss America: Countdown to the Crown

=== Awards ===
==== Preliminary awards ====
Awards	Contestant
Lifestyle and Fitness	Indiana - Katie Stam; Mississippi - Christine Kozlowski; (New York (state)) New York - Leigh-Taylor Smith
Talent	Delaware - Galen Giaccone; (Georgia (U.S. state)) Georgia - Chasity Hardman; Vermont - Ashley Wheeler

==== Quality of Life award ====
Results	Contestant	Platform
Winner	Kentucky - Emily Cox	Uniquely Me: Promoting Self-Esteem in Adolescent Girls
1st runner-up	Michigan - Ashlee Baracy	-
2nd runner-up	Alabama - Amanda Tapley	-
Finalists	Hawaii - Nicole Fox; Indiana - Katie Stam; North Carolina - Amanda Watson; Rhode Island - Francesca Simone; Virginia - Tara Wheeler	Various

==== Other awards ====
Awards	Contestant
Miss Congeniality	Texas - Rebecca Robinson
Non-finalist Talent	Arizona - Erin Nurss; Pennsylvania - Kendria Perry; South Carolina - Anna Perry; Utah - Kayla Barclay; Vermont - Ashley Wheeler

== Delegates ==
State	Name	Hometown	Age	Talent	Placement	Awards	Notes
Alabama	Amanda Tapley	Birmingham	20	Classical Piano	Top 15	Quality of Life Award 2nd runner-up	Received a "Golden Sash" and automatic Top 15 placement at Miss America 2009 pageant on Miss America: Countdown to the Crown
Alaska	Stephany Jeffers	Anchorage	23	Vocal		Charles and Theresa Brown Scholarship	
Arizona	Erin Nurss	Sierra Vista	23	Dance		Non-finalist Talent Award	Sister of Miss Arizona's Outstanding Teen 2005, Adrienne Nurss Contestant at National Sweetheart 2007 pageant
Arkansas	Ashlen Batson	Newark	21	Flute	Top 12		
California	Jackie Geist	Vacaville	22	Ballet	Top 7		1st runner-up at Miss California Teen USA 2002 pageant Previously Miss Teen of the Nation 2004 3rd runner-up at Miss Teenage California 2004 pageant
Colorado	Jamie Dukehart-Conti	Arvada	23	Jazz Dance			Later was NFL cheerleader for the Denver Broncos
Connecticut	Ashley Glenn	Hamden	23	Lyrical Dance			
Delaware	Galen Giaccone	Wyoming	20	Piano	Top 15	Preliminary Talent Award	Previously Delaware's Junior Miss 2006
(Washington, D.C.) District of Columbia	Kate Marie Grinold	Washington, D.C.	22	Ballet	Top 10		
Florida	Sierra Minott	Fort Myers	20	Jazz Dance	4th runner-up		Previously Miss Florida's Outstanding Teen 2005; 3rd runner-up at Miss America's Outstanding Teen 2006 pageant
(Georgia (U.S. state)) Georgia	Chasity Hardman	Columbus	24	Vocal, "Home" from The Wiz	1st runner-up	Preliminary Talent Award	Second African-American to represent Georgia in the Miss America pageant Received a "Golden Sash" and automatic Top 15 placement at Miss America 2009 pageant on Miss America: Countdown to the Crown
Hawaii	Nicole Fox	Honolulu		Traditional Hawaiian Dance	Top 10	Quality of Life Award Finalist	
Idaho	Elise Davis	Idaho Falls	20	Vocal			
Illinois	Katie Lorenz	Plymouth, MI	24	Lyrical Dance			
Indiana	Katie Stam	Seymour	21	Vocal	Miss America 2009	Preliminary Swimsuit Award Quality of Life Award Finalist	Previously Miss Kentuckiana Teen 2002 Previously Indiana's Junior Miss 2005; 2nd runner-up at America's Junior Miss 2005 pageant Received a "Golden Sash" and automatic Top 15 placement at Miss America 2009 pageant on Miss America: Countdown to the Crown
Iowa	Olivia Myers	Sperry	22	Tap Dance	2nd runner-up		
Kansas	Emily Deaver	Augusta	19	Vocal / Piano			
Kentucky	Emily Cox	Campbellsville	22	Piano	Top 12	Quality of Life Award Winner	Niece of Miss Kentucky 1990, Nancy Cox and daughter of Ricky L. Cox Contestant at National Sweetheart 2005 pageant
Louisiana	Blair Abene	Hammond	22	Vocal			Previously Miss Teen Louisiana 2002
Maine	Adrienne Watkinson	Topsham	23	Violin			
Maryland	Louise Schlegel	Silver Spring	20	Vocal			
Massachusetts	Alicia Zitka	West Springfield	22	Lyrical Dance			Graduate of University of Massachusetts Amherst
Michigan	Ashlee Baracy	Westland	23	Jazz Dance	Top 10	Quality of Life Award 1st runner-up	Previously Michigan's Junior Miss 2003 1st runner-up at National Sweetheart 2007 pageant
Minnesota	Angela McDermott	Austin	24	Vocal			Performed "The Star-Spangled Banner" at the 2008 Republican National Convention in Minnesota
Mississippi	Christine Kozlowski	D'Iberville	19	Jazz Dance		Preliminary Swimsuit Award	
Missouri	Lacey Fitzgerald	Kansas City	24	Vocal			
Montana	Jennifer Hepner	Great Falls	23	Belly Dancing			
Nebraska	Gretchen Bergquist	Alliance	24	Vocal			
Nevada	Julianna Erdesz	Reno	24	Vocal			Later Miss Nevada USA 2010
New Hampshire	Natalie C. Shaw	Hooksett	23	Vocal			
New Jersey	Ashley Fairfield	Egg Harbor Township	22	Jazz Dance			
New Mexico	Christina Olmi	Albuquerque	23	Vocal			
(New York (state)) New York	Leigh-Taylor Smith	New York City	22	Vocal	3rd runner-up	Preliminary Swimsuit Award	
North Carolina	Amanda Watson	Raleigh	21	Vocal		Quality of Life Award Finalist	
North Dakota	Tessie Jones	West Fargo	21	Piano			
Ohio	Karissa Renee Martin	Woodsfield	21	Vocal			
Oklahoma	Kelsey Cartwright	Collinsville	20	Lyrical Dance			
Oregon	Danijela Krstić	Beaverton	24	Belly Dance			
Pennsylvania	Kendria Perry	Nazareth	23	Piano		Non-finalist Talent Award	
Rhode Island	Francesca Simone	North Smithfield	23	Vocal		Quality of Life Award Finalist	
South Carolina	Anna Perry	Florence	23	Piano		Non-finalist Talent Award	Daughter of Miss South Carolina 1982, Julia Hill
South Dakota	Alexandra Hoffman	Eureka	20	Vocal	Top 15		Sister of Miss South Dakota Teen USA 2008, Elizabeth Hoffman Previously Miss South Dakota Teen USA 2006 Received a "Golden Sash" and automatic Top 15 placement at Miss America 2009 pageant on Miss America: Countdown to the Crown
Tennessee	Ellen Carrington	Jackson	21	Classical Vocal	Top 7		
Texas	Rebecca Robinson	Buffalo	24	Tap Dance		Miss Congeniality	Previously Miss Texas' Outstanding Teen 2000
Utah	Kayla Barclay	Manti	18	Piano		Non-finalist Talent Award	
Vermont	Ashley Ruth Wheeler	Lyndonville	21	Vocal		Non-finalist Talent Award Preliminary Talent Award	
(United States Virgin Islands) Virgin Islands	Shamika K. Thomas	Saint Thomas	23	Vocal			
Virginia	Tara Wheeler	Woodbridge	24	Vocal		Quality of Life Award Finalist	
(Washington (state)) Washington	Janet Harding	Yelm	21	Piano			
West Virginia	Kayla Lynam	Short Gap	21	Piano			
Wisconsin	Briana Lipor	Racine	22	Vocal			
Wyoming	Courtney Gifford	Sheridan	19	Comedic Vocal			Previously Miss Wyoming's Outstanding Teen 2005 Later Miss Wyoming USA 2013
