= Alexandra Hoffman =

Beauty queen and athlete from South Dakota

- Born: Alexandra Hoffman; November 10, 1987 (age 38); Eureka, South Dakota, U.S.
- Other name: Alex Hoffman
- Education: South Dakota State University
- Height: 6 ft 0 in (1.83 m)
- Beauty pageant titleholder
- Title: Miss South Dakota Teen USA 2006; Miss South Dakota State University 2008; Miss South Dakota 2008
- Hair color: Brown
- Eye color: Brown
- Major competitions: Miss Teen USA 2006; Miss America 2009 (Top 15)

Alexandra Hoffman (born November 10, 1987) is a beauty queen and athlete from Eureka, South Dakota, who competed in the Miss Teen USA pageant and placed in the Top 15 at Miss America 2009.

== Biography ==
=== Pageants ===
Hoffman won her first state pageant title in late 2006 when she was crowned Miss South Dakota Teen USA 2006, having placed in the semi-finals in pageant the year before. She later represented South Dakota in the Miss Teen USA 2006 pageant held in Palm Springs, California on August 11, 2006, but did not place. In the 2007 pageant, when she passed on her title to Kari Schull of Watertown, her sister Elizabeth placed second runner-up. Elizabeth won the Miss South Dakota Teen USA 2008 title the following year, making the Hoffmans the second sister pairing in four years to win the Miss South Dakota Teen USA title.

One week after her sister won Miss South Dakota Teen USA, Hoffman was crowned Miss SDSU, a local preliminary title for Miss South Dakota. She competed in the Miss South Dakota pageant in early June 2008, winning a swimsuit preliminary on 5 June, the talent preliminary award for her vocal performance on 6 June and the title on 8 June. She is the first Miss South Dakota Teen USA to win a Miss America state title, and the first of the Miss Teen USA 2006 delegates to win a second major pageant title. She and her sister reigned concurrently for five months. Her second runner-up was Alexis LeVan, who reigned as Miss South Dakota USA when Hoffman was Miss South Dakota Teen USA in 2006. Hoffman competed in the Miss America 2009 pageant in January 2009 where she made the top 15.

=== Personal life ===
Hoffman graduated from Eureka High School in Eureka, SD, in 2006 and was a student at South Dakota State University, where she holds a number of competitive swimming records. Her father Charles Hoffman was a member of South Dakota House of Representatives representing the 23rd district from 2009 to 2015, and her mother Holly Hoffman was a contestant on Survivor: Nicaragua. Hoffman is currently a traffic reporter for KETV in Omaha, Nebraska.

Awards and achievements
Preceded by Amanda DeCurtins	Miss South Dakota Teen USA; 2006	Succeeded by Kari Schull
Preceded by Kate Wismer	Miss South Dakota; 2008	Succeeded by Morgan Peck
