= Jay Duenwald =

American politician

Member of the South Dakota Senate from the 23rd district
- In office January 14, 2003 – January 13, 2009
- Preceded by: Bob Drake
- Succeeded by: Corey Brown

Member of the South Dakota House of Representatives from the 23rd district
- In office January 14, 1997 – January 14, 2003
- Preceded by: Bob Drake; Nicholas Nemec
- Succeeded by: Tom Hackl; Justin Davis

Personal details
- Born: February 26, 1937 Bowdle, South Dakota
- Died: August 31, 2013 (aged 76) Hoven, South Dakota
- Party: Republican

Jay Duenwald (February 26, 1937 – August 31, 2013) was an American politician who served in the South Dakota House of Representatives from the 23rd district from 1997 to 2003 and in the South Dakota Senate from the 23rd district from 2003 to 2009.

He died of Parkinson's disease on August 31, 2013, in Hoven, South Dakota at age 76.
