= Katie Stam =

American beauty queen

Katie Stam Irk
- Stam at Fort Meade in 2009
- Born: July 9, 1986 (age 40); Seymour, Indiana, U.S.
- Education: Seymour High School; University of Indianapolis
- Title: Indiana's Junior Miss 2005; Miss Duneland 2008; Miss Indiana 2008; Miss America 2009
- Predecessor: Kirsten Haglund
- Successor: Caressa Cameron
- Spouse: Brian Irk (m. 2010)
- Children: 3
- Website: http://www.katiestam.com/

Katie R. Stam Irk (née Stam; born July 9, 1986) is an American beauty queen from Seymour, Indiana, who was crowned Miss America 2009.

== Early life and education ==
Stam was born to Keith and Tracy Stam, both middle school teachers, on July 9, 1986, in southern Indiana. Stam grew up on a dairy farm with her three siblings. She participated in 4-H as a child and showed dairy cattle at the Jackson County Fair.

Stam graduated from Seymour High School in Seymour, Indiana, and later received her bachelor's degree in communication studies from the University of Indianapolis. Stam also interned at the Indianapolis news station, WTHR, in 2007.

== Pageantry ==
Stam began competing in pageants at the age of 15, winning a local title before being named Kentuckiana Teen and advancing and winning her first national pageant. She later won Indiana's Junior Miss in 2005, and was named second runner-up at the 2005 America's Junior Miss competition.

=== Miss Indiana 2008 ===
In November 2007, Stam won the local Miss Duneland title (Michigan City, Indiana). She competed in the Miss Indiana pageant for the first time during June 2008, and was crowned Miss Indiana. For her state talent she performed "Art Is Calling Me."

== Miss America 2009 ==
=== Miss America: Countdown to the Crown ===
On this TLC reality series, viewers followed the 52 Miss America contestants vying for the Miss America 2009 crown. Viewers then had the opportunity to vote online for a contestant to help them earn a "Golden Sash", signifying a secured spot in the top 15. Stam was the first to receive a "Golden Sash" during the first episode.

=== Preliminary competition ===
In the week prior to the televised pageant Stam won a preliminary swimsuit award. Additionally, the three previous Miss Americas, Miss America 2006, Jennifer Berry, Miss America 2007, Lauren Nelson, and Miss America 2008, Kirsten Haglund, had predicted prior to the pageant that Stam would win the Miss America crown.

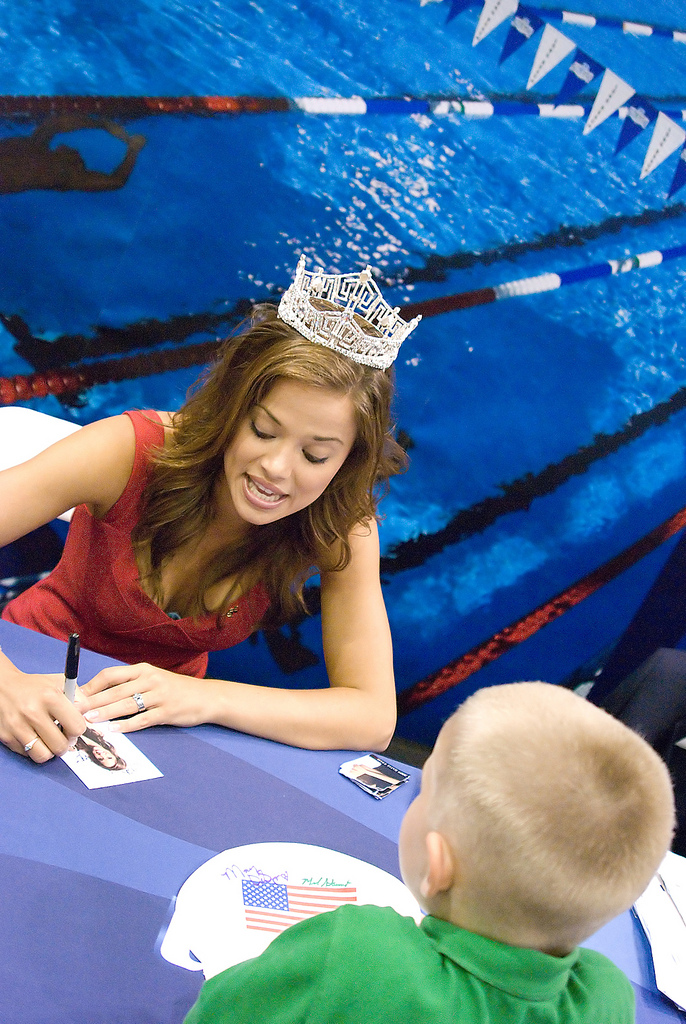
Miss America 2009, Katie Stam signing autographs for fans

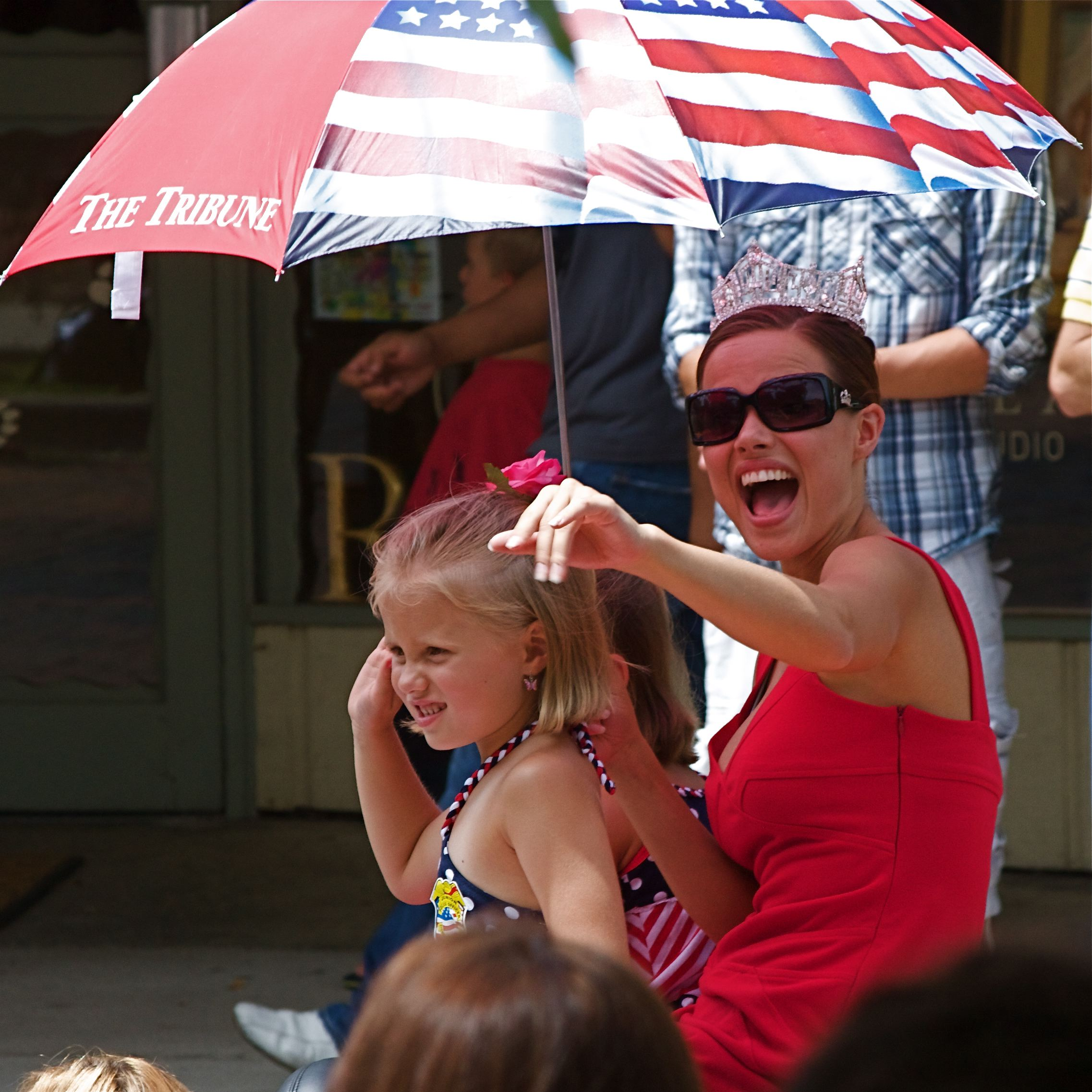
Stam making an appearance in a parade (2009)

=== Miss America telecast ===
The Miss America 2009 pageant was broadcast live on TLC from the Planet Hollywood Resort and Casino in Las Vegas, Nevada on January 24, 2009. For her talent, Stam sang "Via Dolorosa" despite suffering from a throat infection.

At the conclusion of the telecast, Stam beat out first runner-up Miss Georgia 2008, Chastity Hardman, for the title of Miss America 2009 and was crowned by Miss America 2008, Kirsten Haglund. With this win she became the first Miss Indiana to claim the Miss America title. Along with the title of Miss America, she won a $50,000 scholarship.

In interviews held after her winning the Miss America crown, Stam expressed interest in completing her bachelor's degree in communication at the University of Indianapolis and seeking a career as a television news reporter and anchor after her reign.

== Miss America role ==
Her platform was "Passion for Service: Promoting Community Service and Involvement." As Miss America, Stam traveled approximately 20,000 miles each month promoting and speaking on her platform of community service and acted as the official National Goodwill Ambassador for the Children's Miracle Network.

On Thanksgiving Day 2009, Stam served food at the New York Rescue Mission, and also appeared on a float in the Macy's Thanksgiving Day Parade, the first Miss America to do so in nearly a decade.

Stam met President Obama through a joint meeting with the Children's Miracle Network Hospital Champions at the White House.

== Personal life ==
In January 2010, Stam's boyfriend, Brian Irk, proposed to her. They married in July 2010.

Katie Stam Irk gave birth to a daughter in August 2013, and to a second daughter in May 2015.

On October 31, 2016, she gave birth to a son, whose name was determined by the outcome of the 2016 World Series. Stam Irk's husband is a Chicago Cubs fan. So when the couple found out she was pregnant, they decided that if the Chicago Cubs won the World Series, their son would be named Wrigley. If the Cleveland Indians won, then he would be named Oliver. Their son remained unnamed for three days, until the Cubs beat the Indians in Game 7 on November 3, 2016, and he was given the name Wrigley Oliver.

Awards and achievements
Preceded by Nicole Rash	Miss Indiana; 2008	Succeeded by Megan Meadors
Preceded by Kirsten Haglund	Miss America; 2009	Succeeded by Caressa Cameron
