= Betty Maxwell (singer) =

American beauty pageant contestant

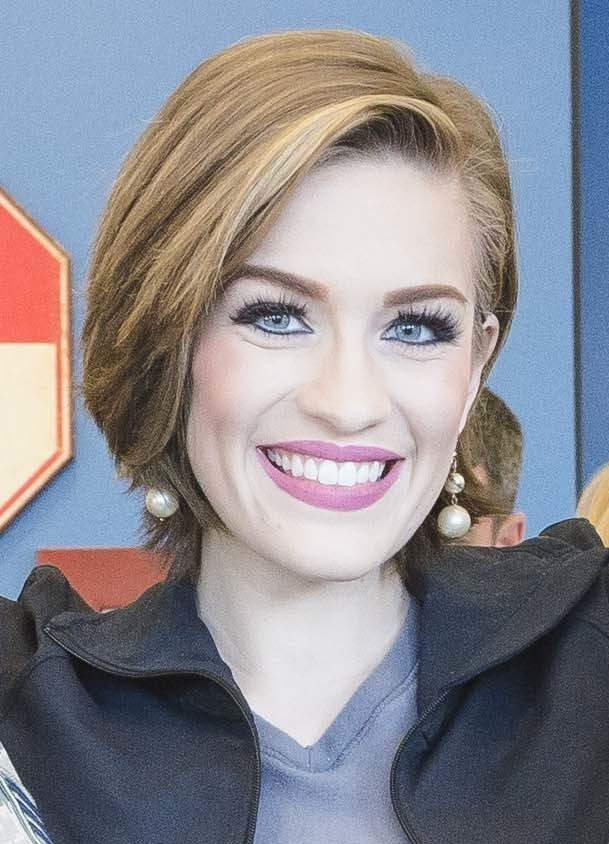
- Cantrell in 2016
- Born: Baciliky Andris Cantrell; September 1, 1994 (age 31); Warner Robins, Georgia, U.S.
- Education: Wesleyan College (attended); Mercer University (attended); Mount de Sales Academy (attended)
- Height: 5 ft 7 in (1.70 m)
- Title: Miss Presidential Pathways 2014; Miss Warner Robins 2015; Miss Georgia 2015; Miss America 2016
- Term: September 13, 2015 – September 11, 2016
- Predecessor: Kira Kazantsev
- Successor: Savvy Shields
- Spouse: Spencer Maxwell (m. 2017)
- Website: bettycantrell.com

Baciliky Andris "Betty" Maxwell (née Cantrell; born September 1, 1994) is an American singer, actress, model, author, and beauty pageant titleholder from Warner Robins, Georgia, who was crowned Miss Georgia 2015. On September 13, 2015, she was crowned Miss America 2016 by Miss America 2015, Kira Kazantsev. She is the first Miss Georgia to be crowned Miss America since Neva Jane Langley, Miss America 1953.

== Early life and education ==
Cantrell was born on September 1, 1994, to physical therapists Mike and Tassie Cantrell. Cantrell is of Greek and German descent and was named after her Greek grandmother, Baciliky (Βασιλική, Vasiliki) meaning "royalty." She grew up on 700 acres (280 ha) of land in Fort Valley, Georgia, and is able to drive a full-sized John Deere tractor, plow and seed fields, and handle a shotgun.

In Macon, Georgia, Cantrell attended Mount de Sales Academy for high school. She attended Wesleyan College and later transferred to Mercer University, where she briefly studied vocal performance.

== Pageantry ==
=== Early pageants ===
Cantrell entered her first pageant in late 2013. Her first three pageants resulted in two first runner-up and one second runner-up finishes.

In February 2014, Cantrell won the Miss Presidential Pathways 2014 title. She was one of 38 qualifiers who competed in the 2014 Miss Georgia pageant. Cantrell entered on a platform of "Healthy Georgia, Strong America." with a vocal performance for the talent portion of the competition. She was named second runner-up for the 2014 state title.

=== Miss Georgia 2015 ===
On July 26, 2014, Cantrell was crowned Miss Warner Robins 2015 which made her eligible to compete at the 2015 Miss Georgia pageant. Entering the state pageant in June 2015, Cantrell's competition talent was a vocal performance of the aria "Tu? tu? Piccolo iddio!" ("You? You? Little idol of my heart!") from Act III of Puccini's opera Madama Butterfly, an aria which is sung by the title character, Cio-Cio-San, to her young half-American son just before her suicide. Cantrell's pageant platform was "Healthy Children, Strong America."

Cantrell won the competition on Saturday, June 20, 2015, when she received her crown from outgoing Miss Georgia titleholder, Maggie Bridges. She earned more than $15,000 in scholarship money from the state pageant plus the use of a Kia Sorento for the duration of her reign. Cantrell also received scholarship awards for winning the talent, evening wear, and on-stage question portions of the competition. As Miss Georgia, her activities included public appearances across the state of Georgia.

=== Miss America 2016 ===
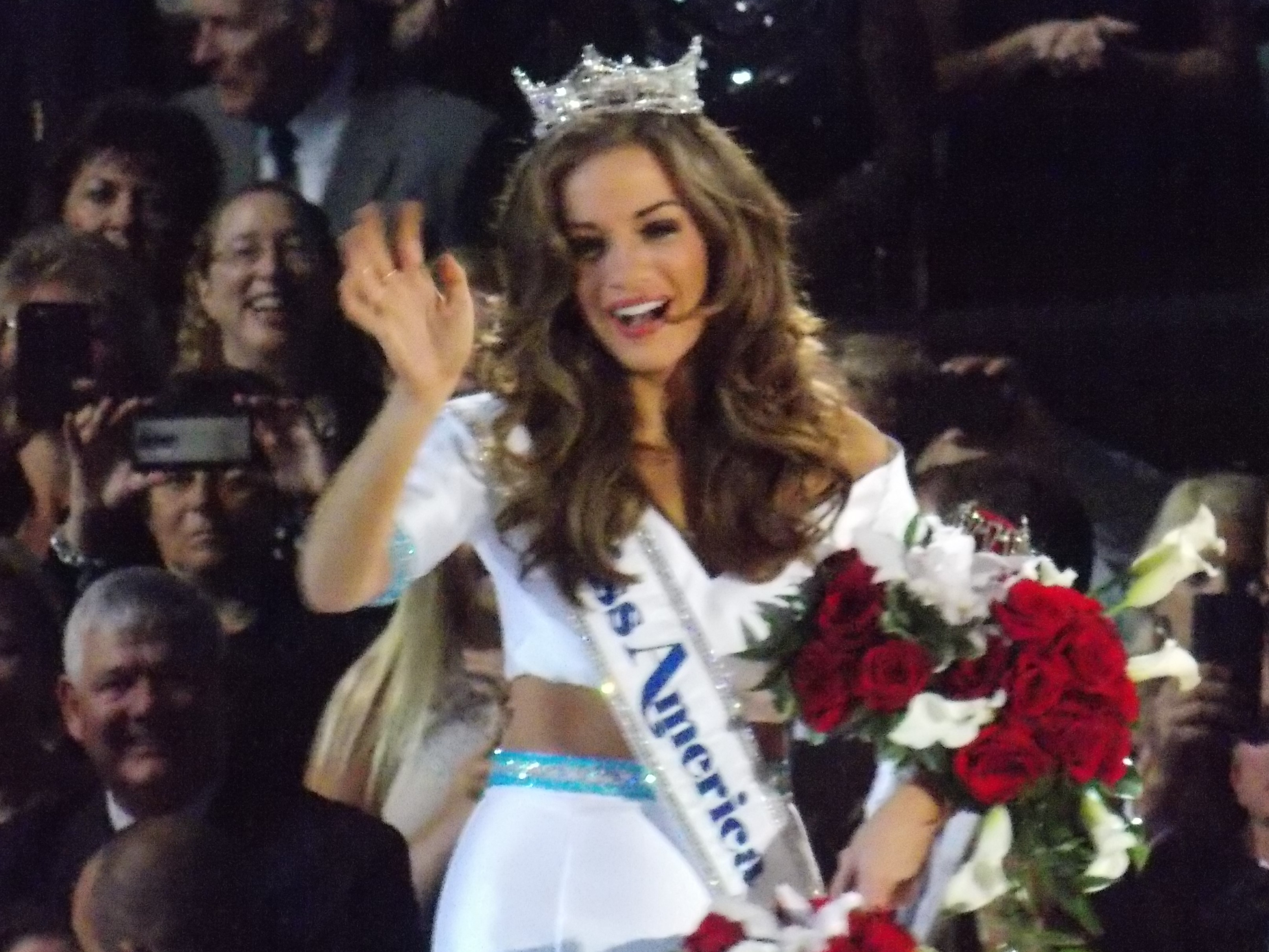
Cantrell victorious in September 2015

Cantrell was Georgia's representative at the Miss America 2016 competition held in Atlantic City, New Jersey, in September 2015. Her platform was "Healthy Children, Strong America," a reflection of growing up on a farm in Georgia, and of her parents who are physical therapists.

Cantrell won the talent portion and a $2,000 scholarship during Thursday night's preliminary competition for again singing the aria "Tu? tu? Piccolo iddio!" from Puccini's Madama Butterfly. In the final round of the competition, Cantrell was asked a question by judge Brett Eldredge: "New England quarterback Tom Brady was suspended for his part in the so-called 'Deflategate' scandal. Legalities aside, did Tom Brady cheat?" Cantrell, who was given 20 seconds to answer, said: "Did he cheat? That's a really good question. I'm not sure. I think I'd have to be there and see the ball and feel it and make sure it was deflated or not deflated. If there was a question there, then yes, I think he cheated." Asked later by a reporter about her response, Cantrell said "It was kind of a funky question...I'm not a football player, and I really wasn't there to feel that ball."

She beat out first runner-up Miss Mississippi 2015, Hannah Roberts, for the 2016 title and was crowned by Miss America 2015, Kira Kazantsev of New York, on September 13, 2015. Along with the title of Miss America, Cantrell also won a $50,000 scholarship. Cantrell is only the second Miss Georgia to win the Miss America title.

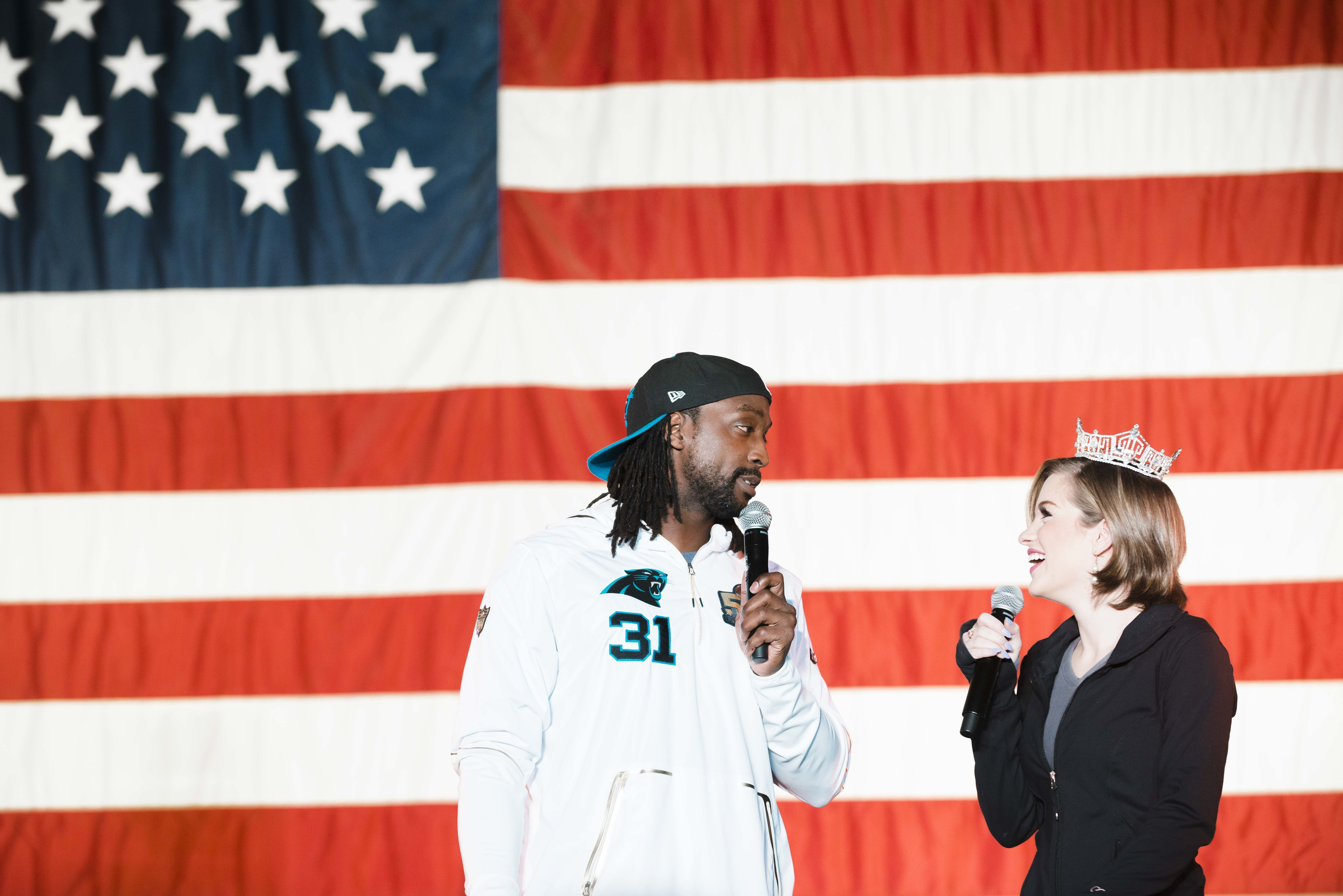
Carolina Panthers cornerback Charles "Peanut" Tillman and Betty Cantrell standing on stage during a USO show at Joint Base Elmendorf-Richardson, Alaska, March 12, 2016.

==== Miss America role ====
As Miss America, Cantrell served as the official National Goodwill Ambassador for Children's Miracle Network Hospitals. Additionally, to further promote her platform of "Healthy Children, Strong America," Cantrell and Team FNV announced a partnership to "promote fruits and vegetables" via Twitter shortly after Cantrell won Miss America 2016. Other members of Team FNV include Jessica Alba, Stephen Curry, Kristen Bell, Nick Jonas, Colin Kaepernick, Christie Rampone, and more.

On November 4, 2015, Cantrell presented with Darius Rucker at the Country Music Association Awards at the Bridgestone Arena in Nashville, Tennessee. On November 22, 2015, Cantrell appeared as a presenter at the 43rd Annual American Music Awards in Microsoft Theater, in Los Angeles, California. Cantrell also presented the award for Single Record of the Year with Jake Owen at the Academy of Country Music Awards on April 3, 2016, at the MGM Grand Garden Arena in Las Vegas. On May 22, 2016, she appeared as a presenter with Mark Cuban at the 2016 Billboard Music Awards in the T-Mobile Arena in Las Vegas, Nevada. It aired live on ABC.

== Personal life ==
After passing on her crown at the 2017 Miss America pageant, Cantrell announced via social media, that she and her long-time boyfriend, Spencer "Spinny" Maxwell, had been engaged since the summer of 2016 and were moving to Nashville, Tennessee for Cantrell to pursue a country music career. Cantrell and Maxwell met on Tinder three months before Cantrell won the Miss Georgia 2015 title and maintained a long-distance relationship throughout her reign as Miss America 2016. The couple eloped on November 8, 2017, at Percy Warner Park in Nashville, Tennessee. The couple later had a formal wedding ceremony for friends and family on April 13, 2018, in Macon, Georgia in Cantrell's hometown Greek Orthodox church.

Awards and achievements
Preceded by Kira Kazantsev	Miss America; 2016	Succeeded by Savvy Shields
Preceded by Maggie Bridges	Miss Georgia; 2015	Succeeded by Adeline Kenerly
