= Maggie Bridges =

Miss Georgia 2014

- Born: Maggie Marie Bridges; December 6, 1992 (age 33)
- Education: Georgia Institute of Technology
- Spouse: Will Kearney (m. 2015)
- Beauty pageant titleholder
- Title: Miss Georgia Fairs 2012; Miss Cobb County 2013; Miss Capital City 2014; Miss Georgia 2014
- Hair color: Blonde
- Major competition: Miss America 2015

Maggie Marie Bridges (born December 6, 1992) is an American beauty pageant titleholder from Brinson, Georgia, who was crowned Miss Georgia 2014. She is the second Georgia Tech student to win the Miss Georgia title. The first Georgia Tech student to win the Miss Georgia title was Tammy Fulwider (a.k.a. Megan Blake) in 1983 Megan Blake. Bridges competed for the Miss America 2015 title in September 2014 but was not a Top 15 finalist.

== Pageant career ==
=== Early pageants ===
Bridges told a reporter from her local newspaper that it had been her dream to compete for Miss America since she was seven years old. As a child, she sang at her local First United Methodist Church and performed in productions by the Bainbridge Little Theater. At age 8, Bridges began competing in pageants. At age 9, Bridges won her first title, Little Miss Pine Seedling.

As a teen, Bridges competed three times for the statewide Miss Georgia's Outstanding Teen title after winning a local qualifying pageant. In 2007, she competed as Miss Capital City's Outstanding Teen. In 2009, she competed as Miss Southern Rivers' Outstanding Teen and was second runner-up for the state title. In 2010, she competed as the Southern Heartland's Outstanding Teen. In her final year of eligibility, she won a preliminary evening wear competition and was the first runner-up to 2010 winner Camille Sims.

Outside of the Miss America system, Bridges won the Miss North Georgia State Fair title in Fall 2011 at a pageant in Marietta, Georgia. She won the statewide Miss Georgia Fairs title in January 2012 at a pageant in Atlanta.

As an adult, Bridges won the Miss Cobb County 2013 title on August 4, 2012, and earned a $10,000 scholarship award. She competed in the 2013 Miss Georgia pageant with the platform "Impacting the Lives of Others Through Volunteerism" and a vocal performance of "You'll Never Walk Alone" from the musical Carousel in the talent portion of the competition. She was named third runner-up to winner Carly Mathis and earned a $3,500 scholarship award.

=== Miss Georgia 2014 ===
On October 5, 2013, Bridges was crowned Miss Capital City 2014. She entered the Miss Georgia pageant in June 2014 as one of 40 qualifiers for the state title. Bridges's competition talent was a vocal performance of the Faith Hill song "There Will Come a Day". Her platform was "Impacting Others Through Volunteerism".

Bridges won the competition on Saturday, June 21, 2014, when she received her crown from outgoing Miss Georgia titleholder Carly Mathis. She earned more than $10,000 in scholarship money, use of a Kia Optima during her reign, and other prizes from the state pageant.

As Miss Georgia, her activities included public appearances across the state of Georgia. Bridges' reign continued until June 20, 2015, when she crowned her successor, Betty Cantrell, Miss Georgia 2015.

=== Vying for Miss America ===
Bridges was Georgia's representative at the Miss America 2015 pageant in Atlantic City, New Jersey, in September 2014. Bridges, a Georgia Tech student, wore 3D printed, laser-cut shoes fashioned after the school's iconic "Ramblin' Wreck" mascot for the pageant's "Show Us Your Shoes" parade. Gambling site OddsShark ranked Bridges at #2 on their list of likely Miss America winners. Bridges was not a Top 15 finalist for the national crown but earned a $3,000 scholarship as her state's representative, a $3,000 Miracle Maker runner-up scholarship, and a $5,000 STEM scholarship.

== Personal life and education ==
Bridges is a native of Brinson, Georgia, and a 2011 graduate of Southwest Georgia Academy in Damascus, Georgia. Her father is John Bridges, a commercial farmer, and her mother is Cathy Bridges. She is the oldest of five siblings.

Bridges studied business administration at the Georgia Institute of Technology. She is the first Georgia Tech student to win the Miss Georgia crown.

Awards and achievements
Preceded by Carly Mathis	Miss Georgia; 2014	Succeeded by Betty Cantrell
