= Mount de Sales Academy (Georgia) =

Catholic school in Macon, Georgia, US

Location
- 851 Orange Street; Macon, Georgia 31201; United States; 32°50′4″N 83°38′24″W

Information
- Type: Private
- Motto: Committed to Excellence
- Religious affiliation: Roman Catholic
- Established: 1876 (150 years ago)
- Founder: Sisters of Mercy
- Authority: Independent
- CEEB code: 111955
- President: Brendan O'Kane
- Dean: Carsten Franklin
- Head of school: Emily Brown (Upper School), Kaylee Gonzalez Freeman (Middle School)
- Chaplain: Father Robert Phillips
- Staff: 87
- Grades: 6–12
- Gender: Coeducational
- Enrollment: 518
- Student to teacher ratio: 8:1
- Campus: Urban
- Colors: Blue and gold
- Mascot: Monty
- Nickname: Cavaliers
- Accreditation: Southern Association of Colleges and Schools, Southern Association of Independent Schools
- Publication: de Sales Sheet Magazine
- Yearbook: Salesian
- Website: www.mountdesales.net

Mount de Sales Academy (MDS) is a Catholic, independent, college preparatory school in Macon, Georgia. It was originally founded in 1876 by five Sisters of Mercy, an order of nuns, as a boarding school for girls. It is the oldest independent school in Middle Georgia and the first to racially integrate. The school is located within the Roman Catholic Diocese of Savannah, operating on an independent basis.

== History ==
=== Early history ===
In 1871 during the post-Civil War Reconstruction era, a group of five Sisters of Mercy from Columbus, Georgia, began a small school known as the Academy of the Sacred Heart Jesus on the corner of 4th and Walnut streets in Macon. In 1876, the mother house of the Sisters relocated from Columbus to Macon. With help from others, the Sisters purchased the former home of Georgia Governor George W. Town for use at the corner of Orange and Columbus streets on Beall's Hill in downtown Macon. On February 28, 1876, the new school was chartered under the name of Mount de Sales in honor of Saint Francis de Sales. When the first graduation exercises were held in 1882, it had expanded to comprise three divisions: primary, preparatory and senior. It educated mostly girls in grades 1-12, housing boarding students from around the southeastern United States and Latin America.

The former residence of Georgia Governor George Towns c. 1880s, the original building and site of Mount de Sales Academy

=== Modernization and expansion ===
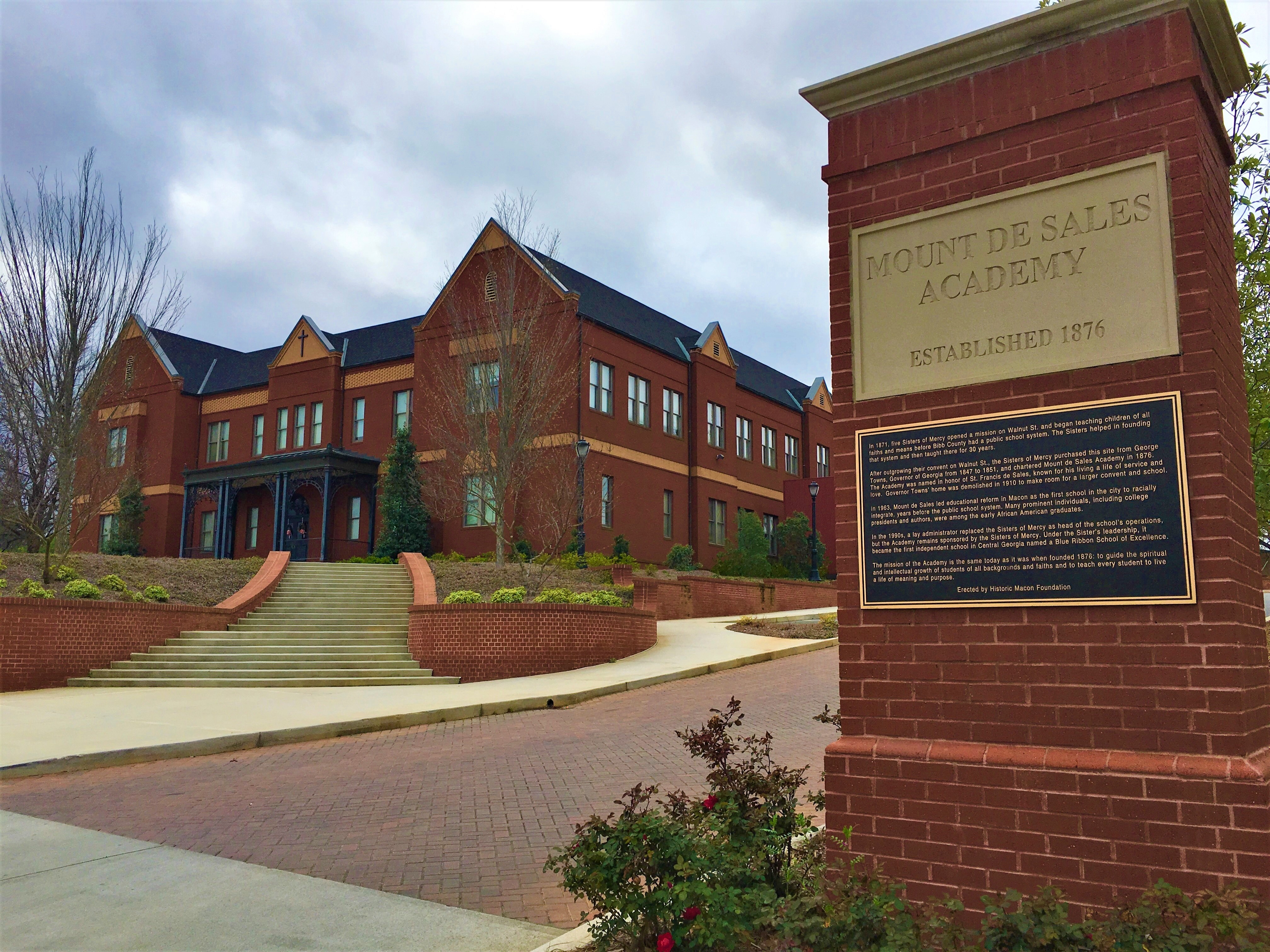
Sheridan Hall

In 1936, Mount de Sales discontinued its primary school. It continued as a girls' secondary school for boarding and day students until 1959, when the first boys were admitted as day students. The girls' boarding school closed in 1963, and the school continued as a co-ed day school. The first coeducational graduating class included 16 boys among 46 total graduates in 1963. The fall of 1963 marked the racial integration of Mount de Sales as a result of a diocesan edict, making it the first school in Middle Georgia to desegregate. A year later, it graduated its first two black students: Eileen Williams and Cheryl Odom.

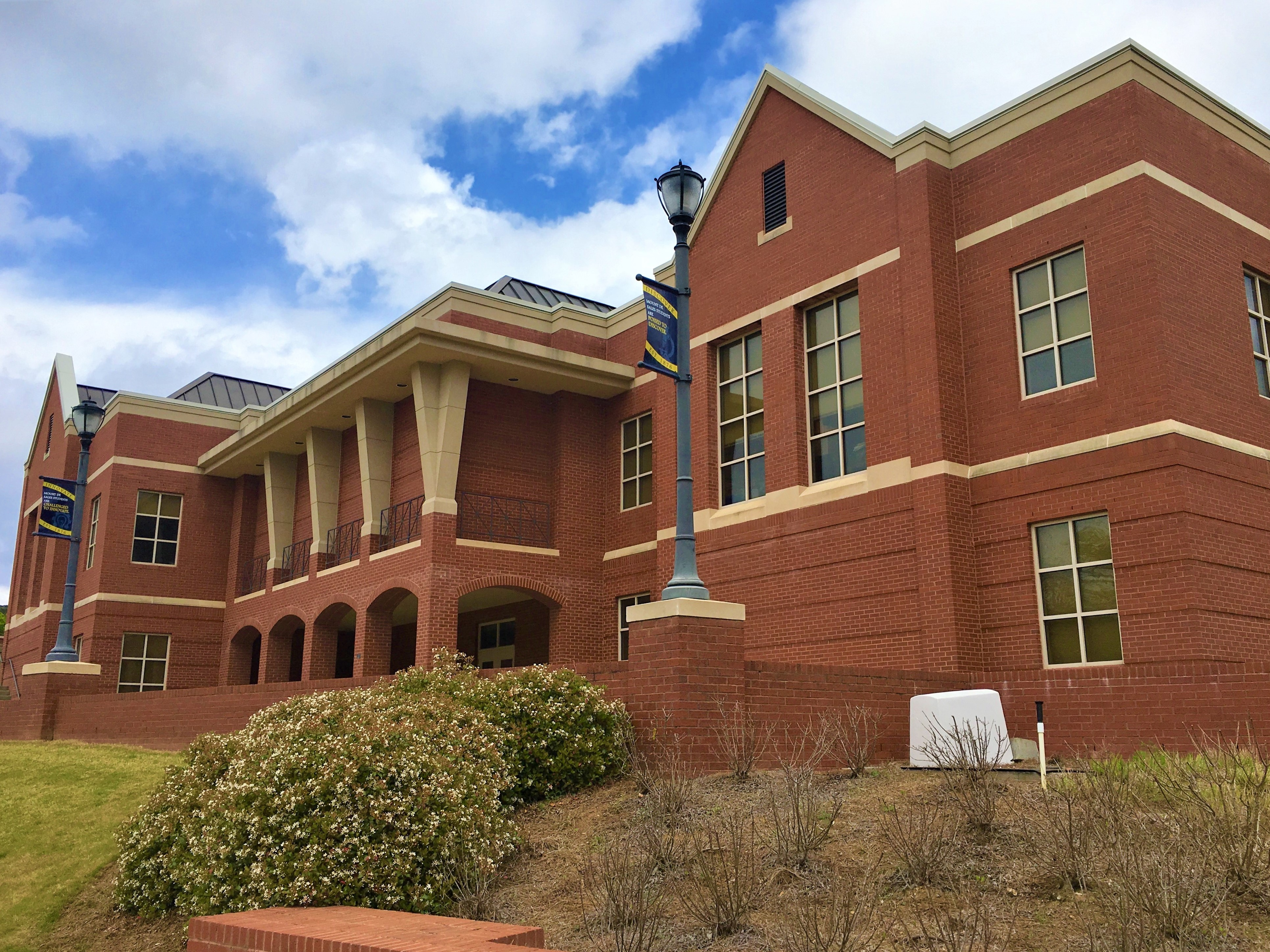
David J. Zuver Performing Arts Center

In 1975, the middle school returned with the re-addition of an eighth grade. A seventh grade was reinstalled in 1988, followed by a sixth grade in 2004. The Sisters of Mercy served in an administrative capacity until 2002, when the first lay head of school was appointed by the Board of Trustees, the school's governing body. Mount de Sales continues to be sponsored by the Sisters of Mercy.

The original convent and boarding school building was demolished in the early 1970s and replaced with Sheridan Hall in 1990. New buildings were constructed over the following decades. Cavalier Fields, a 77 acres (31 ha) athletic complex, opened in 1998, approximately 7 miles (11 km) west of the downtown campus.

In 2015, the school underwent $1 million of enhancements to align with redevelopment changes in Macon's College Hill Corridor, a two-square mile area between Mercer University and the downtown business district.

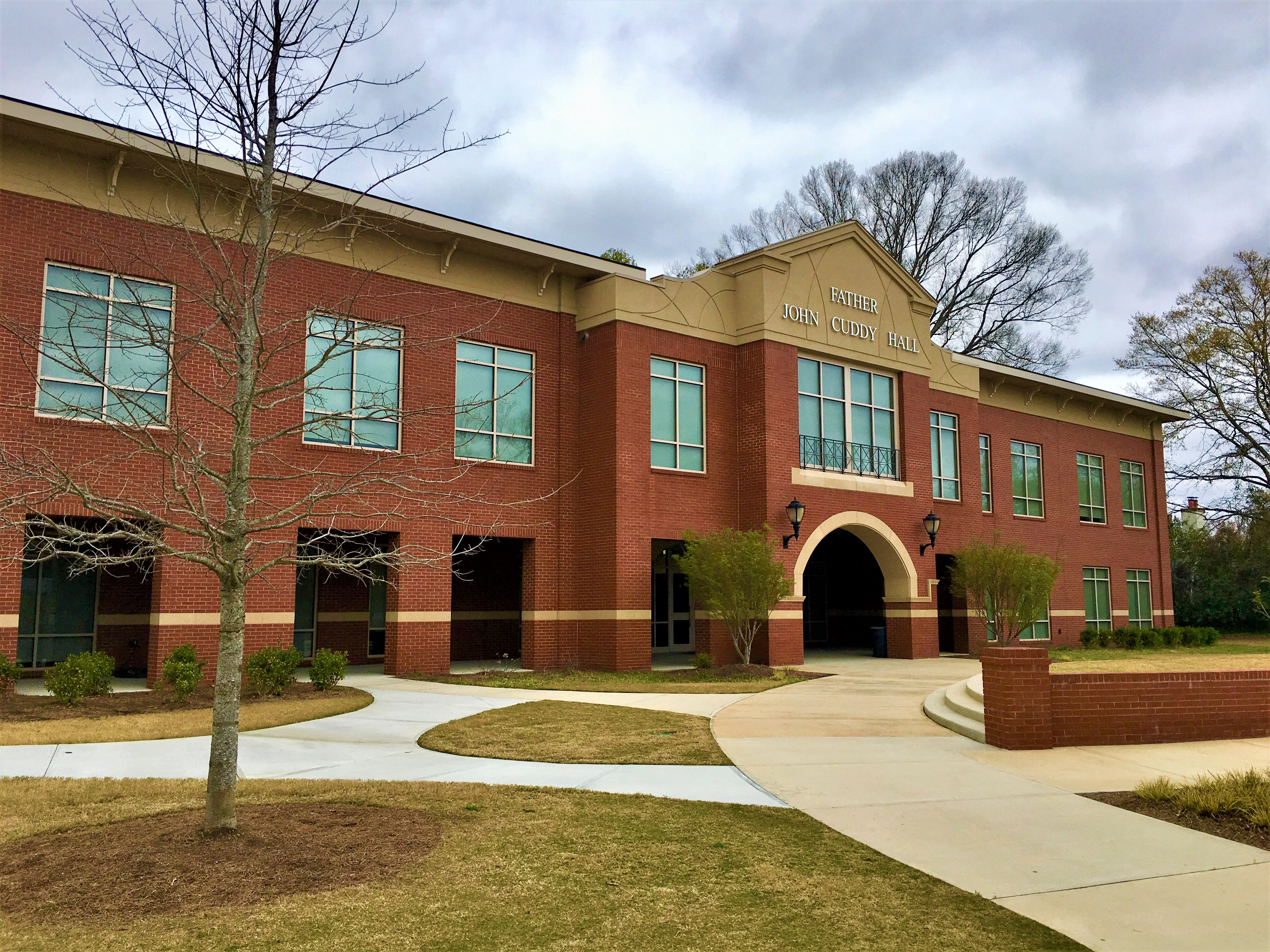
Father John Cuddy Hall

== Academics ==
The upper school's curriculum includes honor, Advanced Placement (AP) and dual-enrollment college courses in most subject areas, along with a broad range of elective courses. Upper school students must perform 20 hours of community service annually, while middle school students are required to complete service projects. The middle school's House System places students in cross-grade level groups to foster positive social development. All students take theology courses and attend Mass on Holy Days. While Mount de Sales has a Catholic heritage, about two-thirds of students are of non-Catholic faiths. Students hail from more than 30 Georgia zip codes and the school hosts dozens of international exchange students.

== Controversy ==
In 2014, the school's administrators fired Flint Dollar, an openly gay music teacher who planned to marry his longtime male partner, based on the Catholic church's doctrine against same-sex marriage. Opposition to the firing came from students and parents. In 2015, both parties reached a confidential legal settlement.

== Athletics ==
Mount de Sales competes in a number of interscholastic athletics in Class A of the Georgia High School Association (GHSA), where it previously was a member from 1961 to 1980. Prior to the 2014-15 school year, it competed for 33 years in the Georgia Independent School Association (GISA).

The Cavaliers, as the school's teams are nicknamed, compete at the varsity, junior varsity and C-team levels. The school also sponsors cheerleading and a band. Cavalier Fields is home to Mount de Sale's football stadium, soccer fields, a track, baseball and softball fields, tennis courts and practice fields. Most indoor athletics are held at McAuley Hall, the downtown campus gymnasium. The Cavalier Sports Hall of Fame honors athletes, coaches, administrators and supporters who have made significant contributions to the athletic program.

=== Fall sports ===
- Clay shooting
- Cross country
- Football
- Softball
- Volleyball

=== Winter sports ===
- Basketball
- Swimming
- Wrestling

=== Spring sports ===
- Baseball
- Golf
- Lacrosse
- Soccer
- Tennis
- Track and field

== Accreditation and membership ==
- Southern Association of Independent Schools
- National Association of Independent Schools
- Georgia Independent School Association
- Georgia High School Association
- National Middle School Association
- Georgia Middle School Association
- National Catholic Education Association
- Mercy Secondary Education Association
- National Association for College Admission Counseling
- Cognia
- National Blue Ribbon School of Excellence (1990–91)

== Notable alumni ==
- Tina McElroy Ansa, novelist
- Bill Berry, drummer for the band R.E.M.
- Mary G. Bryan, former president of the Society of American Archivists
- Betty Cantrell, 2016 Miss America, 2015 Miss Georgia
- Gwendolyne Cowart, WASP pilot in World War II
- Larry Lawrence, professional basketball player
- Natalia Livingston, actress
- Cole Miller, Ultimate Fighting Championship featherweight MMA fighter
- Arnold L. Punaro, former U.S. Marine Corps major general
- Lisa Sheridan, actress
- Dexter Williams II, college football quarterback for the Indiana Hoosiers and the Georgia Southern Eagles
