= Larry Lawrence =

Larry Lawrence or Laurence may refer to:

- Larry Lawrence (basketball) (born 1959), American professional basketball player
- Larry Lawrence (gridiron football) (1949–2012), American football quarterback
- M. Larry Lawrence (1926–1996), American millionaire and U.S. ambassador to Switzerland
- Larry Laurence, pseudonym of Italian American tenor and musical theater performer Enzo Stuarti (1919–2005)
