= Emily Cook =

Emily Cook may refer to:

- Emily Cook (beauty queen) (born 1986), Miss Georgia 2009
- Emily Cook (skier) (born 1979), American freestyle skier
