= Kim of Queens =

2014 American reality TV series

- Genre: Reality television
- Starring: Kim Gravel; Allisyn Hardee Lambes; Jo Hardee
- Country of origin: United States
- Original language: English
- No. of seasons: 2
- No. of episodes: 22

Production
- Executive producers: Tom Forman; Brad Bishop; Bryan O’Donnell; Colleen Conway Grogan; Mary Donahue; Eli Lehrer
- Running time: 40 minutes
- Production companies: Relativity Television; Bogner Entertainment

Original release
- Network: Lifetime
- Release: January 1, 2014 – April 21, 2015

Kim of Queens is a Lifetime reality TV show about a pageant coach, 1991 Miss Georgia winner Kim Gravel, née Hardee, which follows Gravel, her mother Jo, and her younger sister Allisyn as they train young girls for beauty pageants. It premiered on January 1, 2014.

The show is produced by Relativity Television and Bogner Entertainment for Lifetime TV. Its executive producers are Tom Forman, Brad Bishop, Bryan O’Donnell, Colleen Conway Grogan, Mary Donahue, and Eli Lehrer.

== Plot ==
Kim Gravel — a former self-proclaimed 'ugly duckling' who was crowned Miss Georgia at the age of 19 — is a pageant coach. The series follows Gravel as she, along with her mother and sister, tries to find prospective pageant participants.

== Cast ==
- Kim Gravel: Owner of the Pageant Place and previous Miss Georgia.
- Allisyn Hardee Lambes: Kim's sister and an employee at the Pageant Place.
- Jo Hardee: Kim's mother and an employee at the Pageant Place.
- Deborah Tyra: Hannah's mother, whom Kim constantly calls an older barbie doll and says is just trying to make Hannah a mini her. She is good at her makeup and hair but she is not crafty. She is also known as Debbie or Deb and was previously a model.
- Angie: Marah's mother, who adopted Marah and is very open about how she will do anything it takes to make her daughter happy and doesn't care what it takes. She is a dance teacher and prides herself in Marah's ability to clog.
- Lee: Anslee's mom, older than the other moms. She says that her daughter "isn't spoiled, but well loved." She often asks Kim for help when Anslee isn't confident about herself. (season 1)
- Kelly Wingate: Addison's single mother, who brought her daughter to Kim because she "wanted to see the girly girl".
- Eunice: Rayven's mother.
- Hannah Stark: A gymnast and regular at the Pageant Place.
- Marah Collins: A dancer and previous regular at the Pageant Place.
- Anslee: A previous regular at the Pageant Place.
- Addison Wingate: A regular at the Pageant Place.
- Rayven Bailey: A singer and new regular at the Pageant Place in season 2.
- Adia: A singer and newcomer to the Pageant Place in season 2.
- Alexis: An aspiring model and newcomer to the Pageant Place in season 1.

== Production ==
=== Filming ===
In November 2014, Kim Gravel wrote on her blog: "Every day we filmed I would ask God to please in spite of all the difficulties, power struggles, egos, head trips, cast changes, exhaustion, in-fighting, control freaks and breakdowns that there would be BREAKTHROUGHS."

=== Cancellation ===
The series was cancelled during its second season due to disappointing ratings. On the cancellation, Gravel commented "I will have to be honest when the last episode did not air I was heartbroken, a bit bitter and down right pissed."

== Reception ==
Molly Eichel of The A.V. Club wrote that Kim was charismatic but the girls and their mothers fell flat in front of the camera.

== See also ==
- Dance Moms
- Toddlers & Tiaras
