= Neva Jane Langley =

American model (1933–2012)

- Born: Neva Jane Langley; January 25, 1933; Lakeland, Florida
- Died: November 18, 2012 (aged 79); Macon, Georgia
- Education: Wesleyan College
- Occupation: Television celebrity
- Title: Miss America 1953
- Predecessor: Colleen Kay Hutchins
- Successor: Evelyn Ay
- Spouse: William A. Fickling Jr. (m. 1955)
- Children: 4

Neva Jane Langley Fickling (January 25, 1933 – November 18, 2012) was an American actress and beauty queen who was crowned Miss America 1953.

== Early years ==
Langley was born in Lakeland, Florida, the daughter of Roy and Rosie Langley. She began taking piano lessons when she was 7 years old, and at 13 she became the regular pianist for a church. Additionally she played for activities in her community.

In 1950, Langley graduated from Lakeland High School, where she was a cheerleader and was elected homecoming queen. She attended Florida Southern College for one year. As a college sophomore she transferred to Wesleyan College in Macon, Georgia, where she was a member of Alpha Delta Pi sorority. While attending that college she became Miss Macon, Miss Georgia, and then Miss America 1953.

== Miss America ==
Ms. Langley's first television appearance as Miss America was on What's My Line (September 14, 1952) as the mystery guest. She rode the grand prize most-beautiful float by a commercial firm, called "America The Beautiful", in the January 1, 1953 Tournament of Roses Parade in Pasadena, California. During her reign as Miss America, she was hospitalized for one week with pneumonia. She was also known for being the only Miss Georgia to win the Miss America pageant until Betty Cantrell was crowned Miss America 2016, sixty-three years later.

== Career ==
In 1954 Langley began working on television as assistant to Bill Lowery on his program on WLW-A in Atlanta, Georgia. She played the piano on the show and provided "a touch of beauty and glamor to the proceedings".

== Exhibitions ==
Langley has been featured in museum exhibitions, including a display at the Kimball Art Center (2009) of eleven original gowns worn in beauty pageant competitions and during her reign as Miss America, and the exhibition "Georgia's Miss Americas" at the Museum of Arts and Sciences (Sept. 23, 2017–Jan. 14, 2018).

== Personal life ==
Langley married insurance executive, William Arthur Fickling Jr. on December 30, 1954, in Lakeland and was the mother of four children (William, Jane, Julia and Roy).

On November 18, 2012, Langley died of cancer at the age of 79.

Awards and achievements
Preceded by Colleen Kay Hutchins	Miss America; 1953	Succeeded by Evelyn Ay
Preceded by Carol Taylor	Miss Georgia; 1952	Succeeded by Lucia Hutchinson
