= Carly Mathis =

American attorney and beauty pageant titleholder

- Born: Leesburg, Georgia
- Education: University of Georgia
- Beauty pageant titleholder
- Title: Miss Atlanta 2013; Miss Georgia 2013
- Hair color: Blonde
- Eye color: Blue
- Major competition: Miss America 2014 (Top 10)

Carly Mathis is an American attorney and beauty pageant titleholder from Leesburg, Georgia, who was named Miss Georgia 2013.

== Biography ==
She won the title of Miss Georgia on June 22, 2013, when she received her crown from outgoing titleholder Leighton Jordan. Mathis had come second to Jordan the previous year.

Mathis’ platform is “Heart Health and Heart Safety” and she said she hoped to work with the American Heart Association and Children's Healthcare of Atlanta to raise awareness for heart health during her year as Miss Georgia. Her competition talent was a vocal rendition of Carrie Underwood's “I Know You Won't.” Mathis graduated with a degree in digital and broadcast journalism from the University of Georgia in May 2013.

Mathis planned to attend law school when her year as Miss Georgia was over. After graduating from the University of Georgia in 2013, Carly enrolled at the University of Georgia School of Law in 2015. She later became a "Double-Dawg" by graduating in 2018, passed the Georgia Bar Exam, and is now a practicing attorney in Atlanta. Mathis' mother, Wendy Gillespie, was Miss Albany 1985.

Awards and achievements
| Preceded by Leighton Jordan | Miss Georgia; 2013 | Succeeded by Maggie Bridges |
