= Gwendolyne Cowart =

American pilot

- Cowart in 1940
- Born: Gwendolyne Elizabeth Cowart; April 24, 1920; Greenville, South Carolina, US
- Died: February 28, 2003 (aged 82); Houston, Texas, US
- Other names: Gwendolyne Cowart Hickerson, Elizabeth Gwendolyne Hickerson
- Occupation: Pilot
- Known for: WASP during World War II
- Awards: Congressional Gold Medal (2009)

Gwendolyne Elizabeth Cowart (April 24, 1920 – February 28, 2003) was an American pilot who served as a Women Airforce Service Pilot (WASP) during World War II.

== Early life ==
Gwendolyne Elizabeth Cowart was born in Greenville, South Carolina, in 1920, the daughter of James Monroe Cowart and Louie Leonie Lester Cowart. Her father was a locomotive engineer; her parents were divorced in 1928. She was raised by her mother in Georgia, and as a young woman performed on roller skates in shows. She attended Mount de Sales Academy in Macon, Georgia.

== Career ==
Cowart was "the youngest girl in the South to get a commercial flying license," and was an officer in Atlanta's Southeastern Aviatrix Association in 1940. That year, she made news for landing a plane in a cow pasture after it ran out of fuel.

During World War II, Cowart first served as an assistant instrument instructor for the U.S. Navy at Camp Gordon, before she became a Women Airforce Service Pilot (WASP). She trained to fly pursuit fighter aircraft at Avenger Field in Sweetwater, Texas, and was assigned to New Castle Army Air Base in Delaware.

She was a member of the Women's Flight Training Detachment headed by Jacqueline Cochran. She ferried P-38s and P-47s across the United States. "You know, you can pick up a nice 350 miles an hour in those ships," she told an interviewer in 1944. Later in life, she worked as an artist for the Corpus Christi Independent School District.

== Personal life ==
Cowart married fellow pilot James Hickerson. She had a son, Gary Hickerson. She died in 2003, in Houston, Texas, aged 82 years. She was named in the listing of WASPs awarded a posthumous Congressional Gold Medal in 2009.
