= Leighton Jordan =

American beauty pageant winner (born 1992)

- Born: November 5, 1992 (age 33); Suwanee, Georgia
- Education: University of Alabama in Huntsville
- Beauty pageant titleholder
- Title: Miss Capital City 2012; Miss Georgia 2012
- Hair color: Brunette
- Eye color: Blue
- Major competition: Miss America 2013

Leighton Jordan (born November 5, 1992) is an American beauty pageant titleholder from Suwanee, Georgia who was named Miss Georgia 2012.

== Biography ==
She won the title of Miss Georgia on June 23, 2012, when she received her crown from outgoing titleholder Michaela Lackey. Jordan's platform is the "Sibling Support Project," a national program designed to increase peer support and information opportunities for siblings of special needs children. Her older brother suffers from numerous health problems, including deafness, cerebral palsy and epilepsy, inspiring her work with families with special needs children. Her competition talent was a ballet en pointe to "He's a Pirate." Jordan was home-schooled though high school, and plans to attend college at Georgia State University to study nursing and become a pediatric oncology nurse practitioner.

Awards and achievements
Preceded by Michaela Lackey	Miss Georgia; 2012	Succeeded by Carly Mathis
