= Kira Dixon =

American beauty pageant contestant (born 1991)

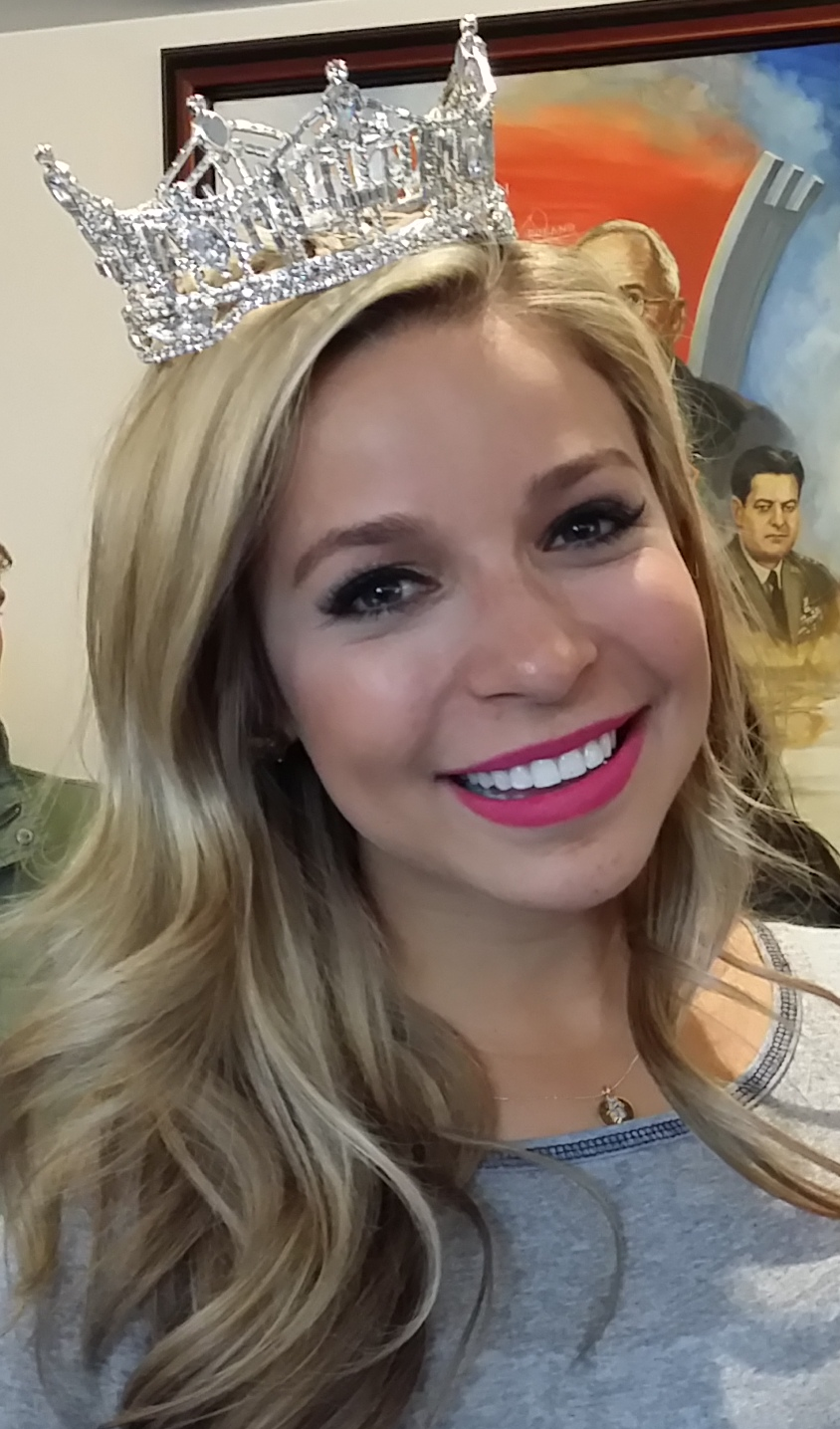
- Dixon in March 2015
- Born: Kira Kazantsev; July 20, 1991 (age 35); San Francisco, California
- Education: Hofstra University
- Height: 5 ft 5 in (1.65 m)
- Title: Miss California Preteen 2004; Miss California Junior Teen 2007; Miss Cosmopolitan 2013; Miss City of New York 2014; Miss New York 2014; Miss America 2015
- Term: September 14, 2014 – September 13, 2015
- Predecessor: Nina Davuluri
- Successor: Betty Cantrell
- Spouse: Andrew Dixon (m. 2019)
- Website: kirakazantsev.com

Kira Dixon (née Kazantsev; born July 20, 1991) is an American beauty pageant titleholder who won Miss America 2015 on September 14, 2014. She is the third consecutive Miss America winner from New York and had won the title of Miss New York on May 24, 2014, while serving as Miss City of New York.

== Early life and education ==
Dixon was born on July 20, 1991, in San Francisco, California, to Russian immigrants who left Moscow in 1990 for the United States, making her a first-generation American. Her father, George, is a general surgeon and her mother, Julia (née Afrikian), is a real-estate broker. Her mother is of Armenian descent. Dixon is trilingual, being fluent in English, Russian, and Spanish.

She graduated from Las Lomas High School in Walnut Creek, California, and served as the student body president in 2009. She attended Hofstra University in Hempstead, New York, with a triple major in political science, global studies, and geography. She joined the Alpha Phi sorority during her time at Hofstra, but was eventually removed from the sorority by the university due to concerns over hazing. After graduating from Hofstra, Dixon applied to numerous law schools and was accepted to Notre Dame Law School and Fordham Law School. She stated in interviews, after being named Miss America 2015, her desire to specialize in international law upon receiving her J.D. degree.

In the summer of 2017, Dixon attended the Stanford Graduate School of Business completing the Stanford Ignite entrepreneurship program, which is a "suite of certificate programs that teaches innovators to formulate, develop, and commercialize their ideas."

== Pageantry ==
=== Early pageantry ===
At age 13, she was named Miss California Preteen 2004, and at age 16, she was named Miss California Junior Teen 2007.

=== Miss New York 2013 ===
Dixon competed in the Miss New York 2013 pageant as Miss Cosmopolitan 2013. She placed in the Top 10.

=== Miss New York 2014 ===
The following year, Dixon competed in the Miss New York 2014 pageant as Miss City of New York 2014. She won the title of Miss New York 2014 and was crowned by Miss New York 2013 Amanda Mason.

=== Miss America 2015 ===
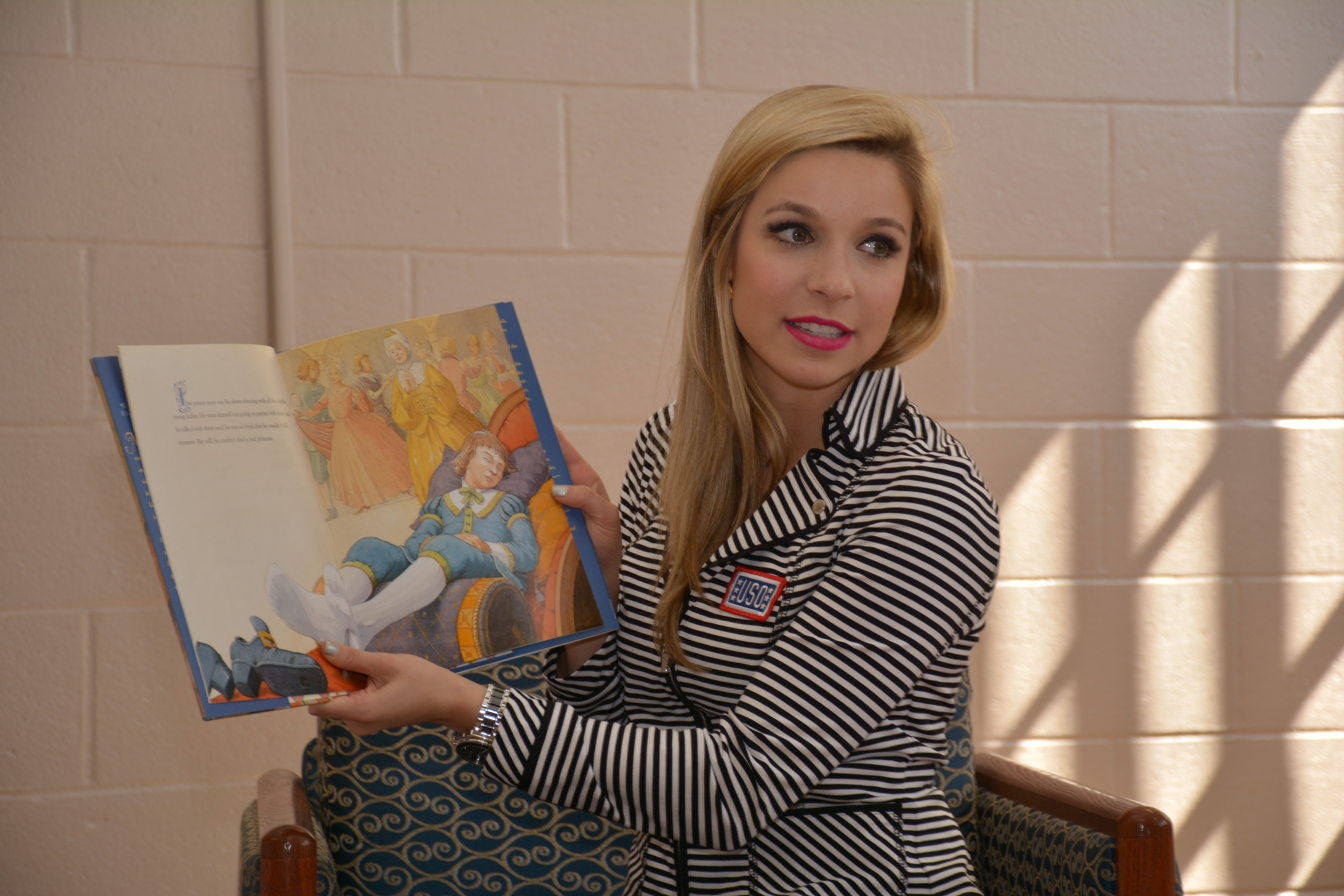
Dixon reads to children living at Aberdeen Proving Ground, a US military installation in Maryland.

Dixon, representing New York, was one of the 53 delegates competing in the Miss America 2015 pageant held in Atlantic City, New Jersey, in September 2014. Her platform was "Love Shouldn't Hurt": Protecting Women Against Domestic Violence; Dixon stated that her personal experience with domestic violence was the inspiration for choosing this platform.

For her talent she sang "Happy" by Pharrell Williams as she used a red plastic cup as a percussion, in a manner that was similar to Anna Kendrick's character in the movie Pitch Perfect and Kendrick's "Cups" music video.

During the on-stage question portion of the contest, she was asked what issue women in the senate need to put on the forefront. Dixon stated that she felt military sexual assault needed attention and resources of women in congress. She noted that she was happy that female politicians were already doing so, and proud to be a constituent of one of these women (Senator Kirsten Gillibrand).

She was crowned by outgoing Miss America 2014, Nina Davuluri, beating out first runner-up, Miss Virginia 2014, Courtney Garrett. She was the third consecutive Miss New York to earn the title of Miss America. Her win made New York the first state to have a Miss America winner three years in a row.

==== Hazing controversy ====
In September 2014, relying on unnamed sources, Jezebel published a piece stating that, while at Hofstra University, Dixon was expelled from the Alpha Phi sorority for hazing. On Good Morning America, Dixon admitted her involvement in activities that fit the "broad definition of hazing," but denied the allegations of abuse, describing the hazing at Alpha Phi as "menial tasks." In her personal blog, Dixon wrote that not attending national Alpha Phi's judiciary hearing of her case was the official reason for the termination.

==== Miss America role ====
As Miss America, Dixon served as the official National Goodwill Ambassador for Children's Miracle Network Hospitals. Additionally, to further promote her platform of "Love Shouldn't Hurt", Dixon teamed up with Safe Horizon to launch the #PutTheNailinIt campaign with the aim to "end domestic violence for good." The campaign aims to spread awareness of domestic violence by painting your ring fingernail purple.

On November 23, 2014, Dixon appeared as a presenter at the 42nd Annual American Music Awards in Nokia Theatre L.A. Live, in Los Angeles, California. On December 15, 2014, she appeared as a presenter at the American Country Countdown Awards in Nashville, Tennessee. She also presented at the Academy of Country Music Awards on April 19, 2015, at the AT&T Stadium in Arlington, Texas. On May 17, 2015, she appeared as a presenter with Pete Wentz at the 2015 Billboard Music Awards in the T-Mobile Arena in Las Vegas, Nevada.

Dixon was also the first Miss America in 35 years to travel with the United Service Organizations (USO) and visit troops abroad.

== Career ==
Dixon is the Children's Miracle Network Hospitals' Director of Digital Channels and Community Engagement.

In November 2017 Dixon launched a podcast called "What We Do," in which every week she talks with women about, "the tough issues, the challenges we've faced, the best moments, the funny moments and the not so great moments."

In 2021 she joined Golf Channel as reporter on a number of events throughout PGA Tour season while also appearing on Golf Today and Golf Central shows and becoming special contributor to GolfPass. Prior to that, she served as a GolfPass lifestyle correspondent.

In 2022, she began covering US swim meets for NBC beginning with the International Team Trials in April continuing through July with the National Championships and in 2023 reporting for the FINA World Championships

In 2024 she worked as a sideline reporter for select college basketball games for NBC Sports.

In 2023 she worked with Sky Sports at the 2023 PGA Championship.

== Personal life ==
On September 4, 2018, Dixon announced her engagement to long-time boyfriend and Marine, Andrew Dixon. The couple married on September 21, 2019, in Alexander Valley, California.

Awards and achievements
Preceded by Nina Davuluri	Miss America; 2015	Succeeded by Betty Cantrell
Preceded by Amanda Mason	Miss New York; 2014	Succeeded by Jillian Tapper
