= Evelyn Ay Sempier =

1954 Miss America (1933–2008)

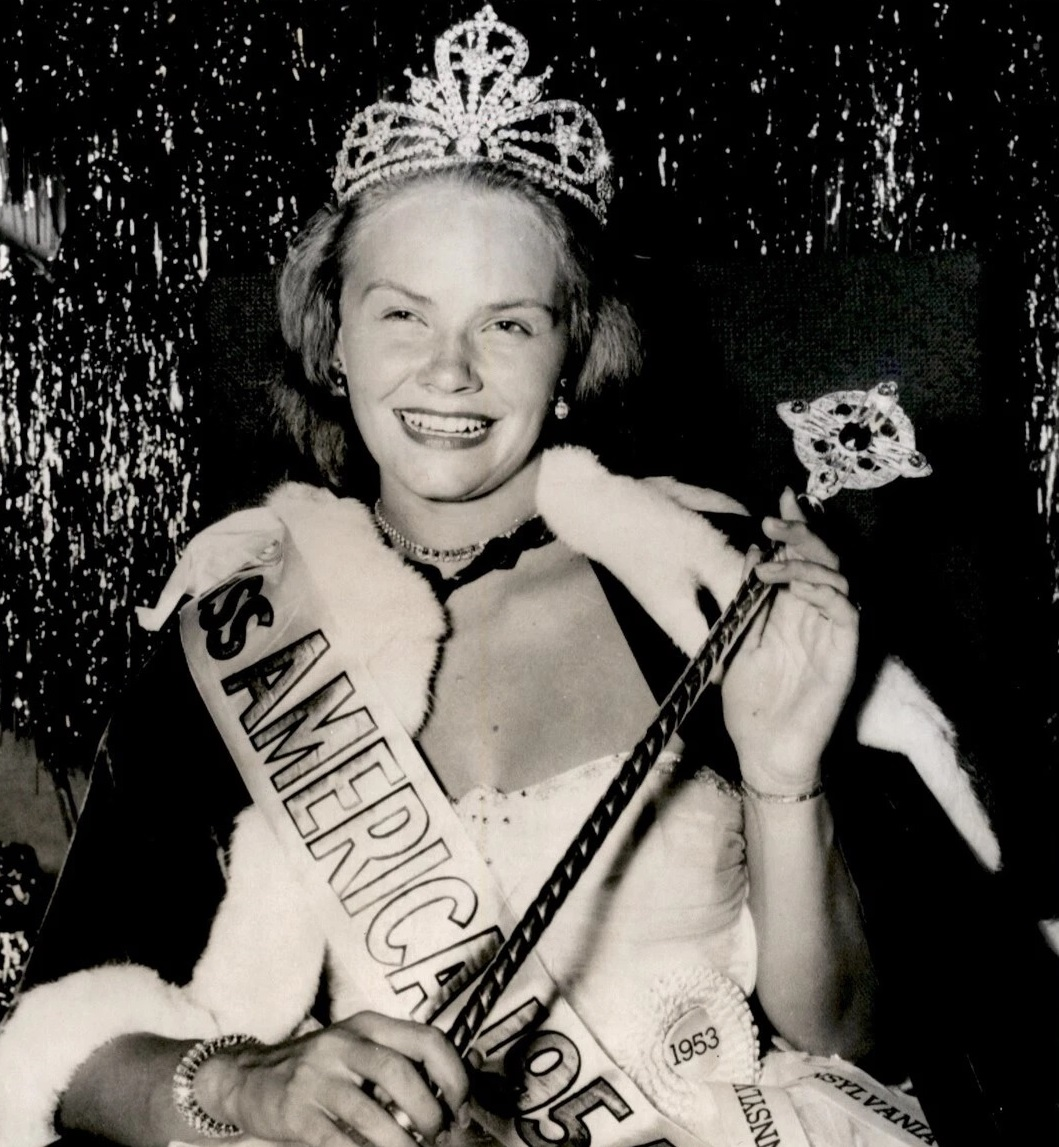
- Born: Evelyn Margaret Ay; March 8, 1933; Ephrata, Pennsylvania, U.S.
- Died: October 18, 2008 (aged 75)
- Occupations: Marketing, motivational speaking
- Title: Miss America 1954
- Predecessor: Neva Jane Langley
- Successor: Lee Meriwether
- Spouse: Carl G. Sempier (m. 1954; died 2007)
- Children: 2

Evelyn Margaret Sempier (née Ay; March 8, 1933 – October 18, 2008) was winner of the 1954 Miss America beauty pageant.

== Early life ==
Ay was born the daughter of German immigrants in Ephrata, Pennsylvania.

== Pageantry ==
She had a short but successful career in smaller beauty contests. As Miss Ephrata Fair and Tobacco Queen of Lancaster County in 1950, she wore a crown that looked like tobacco leaves. After graduating from Ephrata High School in 1951, she won the titles of Miss Pennsylvania AMVET and the Miss National AMVET in 1952, as well as the Miss Pennsylvania title in 1953. She was selected Miss America at the last year before the pageant was televised.

In a 1993 interview, "Evvy" said she was surprised at her victories. "That was the ultimate role model, like being Doris Day in real life." She embarked on her career as a favor to a friend who was trying to promote a pageant for the Junior Chamber International (JayCees). She traveled 270,000 miles (434,523 km) during her yearlong reign, and remained active with the pageant for many years, judging many local pageants and the national Miss America contest in 1981.

== Career ==
Sempier officially introduced the Nash Metropolitan at the 1954 Chicago Auto Show. She was a spokesperson for Nash Motors in promoting the first American car that was marketed specifically to women. She described her marketing for Nash as the finest among her 40-years of commercial relationships, and the company was "most generous in sponsoring Miss America in many parts of America."

Between the 1960s and 1990s, she made frequent appearances as a motivational speaker to women's and business groups.

== Personal life ==
Shortly after passing on the Miss America crown, she married Carl G. Sempier, a Navy veteran and corporate executive who she met when they were both students at University of Pennsylvania, on November 13, 1954, and had two children. Carl Sempier died in 2007. Sempier died on October 18, 2008, of colorectal cancer.

== Evelyn Ay Sempier Quality of Life Award ==
The Evelyn Ay Sempier Quality of Life Award was established to honor the 1954 pageant winner. The award was introduced in 1988, and is given to select Miss America contestants involved with the Children's Miracle Network, as well as to "recognize contestants who excel in their commitment to community service".

Awards and achievements
Preceded by Neva Jane Langley	Miss America; 1954	Succeeded by Lee Meriwether
Preceded by Miriam Smith	Miss Pennsylvania; 1953	Succeeded by Barbara Nager
