= Miss America 1953 =

Neva Jane Langley 26th miss America, representing the State of Georgia

- Date: September 6, 1952
- Venue: Boardwalk Hall, Atlantic City, New Jersey
- Entrants: 52
- Placements: 10
- Winner: Neva Jane Langley; Georgia

Miss America 1953, the 26th Miss America pageant, was held at the Boardwalk Hall in Atlantic City, New Jersey on September 6, 1952.

Neva Jane Langley became the first Miss Georgia to win the crown.

== Results ==
=== Placements ===
Placement	Contestant
Miss America 1953	Georgia – Neva Jane Langley
1st Runner-Up	Indiana – Ann Marie Garnier
2nd Runner-Up	California – Jeanne Shores
3rd Runner-Up	Alabama – Gwen Harmon
4th Runner-Up	Chicago – Jo Hoppe
Top 10	Greater Philadelphia – Patricia Mary Hunt; Hawaii – Beverly Kathleen Rivera; Louisiana – Barbara Frances Barker; New York City – Joan Elizabeth Kayne; South Carolina – Mary Kemp Griffin

=== Awards ===
==== Preliminary awards ====
Awards	Contestant
Lifestyle and Fitness	Alabama - Gwen Harmon (tie); California - Jeanne Shores (tie); Chicago - Jo Hoppe; Georgia - Neva Jane Langley
Talent	District of Columbia - Iris Anne Fitch; Georgia - Neva Jane Langley; New York City - Joan Elizabeth Kayne

==== Other awards ====
Awards	Contestant
Miss Congeniality	District of Columbia - Iris Anne Fitch (tie); Oklahoma - Shirley Maurine Barbour (tie)
Non-finalist Talent	North Dakota - Margaret Aandahl

== Contestants ==
State	Name	Hometown	Age	Talent	Notes
Alabama	Gwen Harmon	Birmingham	19	Vocal, "A Heart That's Free"	
Arkansas	Bonnie Nicksic	Hot Springs		Vocal/Dance, "Life Upon the Wicked Stage" from Show Boat	
California	Jeanne Shores	Azusa		Dramatic Monologue	
Canada	Marilyn "Thelma" Delores Reddick	Agincourt			
Chicago	Jo Hoppe	Chicago		Tap Dance	
Colorado	Chardelle Hayward	Fort Collins		Piano	
Connecticut	Joyce Yeske	West Hartford		Ballroom Dance	
Delaware	Helen Blackwell	Wilmington		Classical Vocal	
(Washington, D.C.) District of Columbia	Iris Fitch	Washington D.C.	19	Vocal, "With a Song in my Heart"	
Florida	Marcia Crane	Orlando		Piano, "Gershwin Prelude"	
(Georgia (U.S. state)) Georgia	Neva Jane Langley	Macon	19	Classical Piano, "Toccata"	
Greater Philadelphia	Patricia Hunt	Philadelphia		Drama	
Hawaii	Beverly Kathleen Rivera	Honolulu		Hula	
Idaho	ZoeAnn Warberg	Twin Falls	18	Speech, "The Sacred Duty of the American to Vote"	First female judge in Idaho's 5th Judicial District and appeared on the 1985 Miss America telecast. ZoeAnn Warberg Shaub died at 83 on Sept. 13, 2017 as result of a car accident in rural Jackpot, Nevada.
Illinois	Glenna Marie Pohly	Rock Falls		Flute	
Indiana	Ann Garnier	Indianapolis		Classical Vocal, "Il Baciò" by Luigi Arditi	
Iowa	Carolyn Hill	Cedar Falls	19	Vocal, "You're My Everything"	
Kansas	Kay Ann Goforth	McPherson		Vocal/Dance	
Kentucky	Joy Williams	Lexington		Dance	
Louisiana	Barbara Barker	Monroe		Drama, "The Fog"	
Maine	Norma Lee Collins	Caribou			
Maryland	Shirley Virginia Harrison	Baltimore		Monologue from Tom Sawyer	
Massachusetts	Barbara Graves	Milton			
Michigan	Karol Dragomir	Benton Harbor		Vocal, "I'll Walk Alone"	
Minnesota	Carole Wick	Duluth		Vocal	
Mississippi	Dora Livingston	Yazoo City			
Missouri	Florence Spack	Clayton		Vocal	
Montana	Karen Whittet	Livingston		Piano	
Nebraska	Helen Francis Burhorn	Omaha		Piano, Warsaw Concerto	
Nevada	Bonnie Wilson	Reno		Ballet, "Something to Dance About"	
New Hampshire	Barbara Temperly	Goffstown			
New Jersey	Mary Parker	Gibbsboro		Drama	
(New York (state)) New York	Joan St. John	Binghamton		Vocal	
New York City	Joan Kayne	New York City		Dance	
North Carolina	Barbara Harris	Salisbury		Classical Vocal, "Mon cœur s'ouvre à ta voix"	
North Dakota	Margaret Aandahl	Litchville		Piano	
Ohio	Carol Koontz	Bolivar		Fire Baton Twirling & Clarinet	
Oklahoma	Shirley Barbour	Tulsa		Drama	
Oregon	Mary Lou Teague	Eugene		Vocal, "Love is Where You Find it"	
Pennsylvania	Miriam Smith	McAlisterville		Pipe Organ, "Tico Tico"	
Puerto Rico	Helga Edmee Monroig				
Rhode Island	Jayne Bradshaw	Westerly		Classical Vocal	
South Carolina	Mary Griffin	Florence		Classical Vocal	1st Runner-up at Miss USA 1953 representing Myrtle Beach 5th Runner-up at Miss World 1953 representing the United States
South Dakota	Sandra Hart	Huron		Fire Baton Twirling	
Tennessee	Gloria Williams	Chattanooga		Vocal, "Lover, When You're Near Me"	
Texas	Connie Hopping	Littlefield		Vocal	
Utah	Marylyn Reese	Brigham		Monologue, "The Mudlark" & "Our Town"	
Vermont	Barbara Moore	St. Johnsbury		Baton Twirling/Dance	
Virginia	Edna Long	Richmond		Dance	
West Virginia	Nancy Rohrbough	Grafton		Dance	
Wisconsin	Jeannie Eleanor Huston	La Crosse	19	Cello	
Wyoming	Ruth Francis	Casper		Drama	
