= Emily Cook (beauty queen) =

American beauty pageant contestant

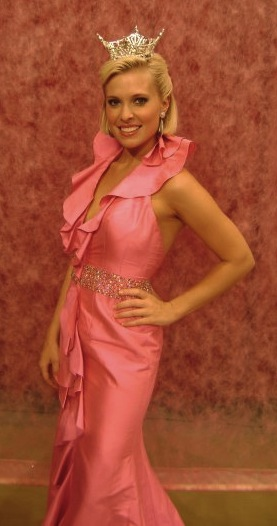
- Born: Emily Cook; September 17, 1986 (age 40); Marietta, Georgia, U.S.
- Education: Kennesaw Mountain High School; University of Miami; University of Georgia Law School
- Height: 5 ft 5 in (1.65 m)
- Beauty pageant titleholder
- Title: Miss Cobb County 2009; Miss Georgia 2009 (Note: Cook originally placed as first runner-up for the title of Miss Georgia 2009, but assumed the title when the original titleholder, Kristina Higgins, resigned due to her responsibilities as a middle school teacher after reigning for 12 hours.)
- Hair color: Blonde
- Eye color: Blue
- Major competition: Miss America 2010

Emily Cook (born September 17, 1986) is a beauty queen from Marietta, Georgia. She was Miss Georgia 2009 and competed in the Miss America 2010 pageant.

She originally placed as first runner-up for the title of Miss Georgia 2009, but assumed the title when the original titleholder, Kristina Higgins, resigned due to her responsibilities as a middle school teacher after reigning for 12 hours.

After completing her year of service during which she traveled over 30,000 miles inside Georgia, she began her legal studies at the University of Georgia Law School.

Her personal platform was breast cancer awareness in young women and she has continued to advocate for breast cancer awareness since giving up her title. She raised money and awareness by completing the Tough Mudder adventure race in 2010 and continues to work closely with Bikers Battling Breast Cancer and the Pink Kick Starter Project.

In the fall of 2019, she opened Southern Belle Georgia Boy in Atlanta, Georgia, with her husband, Joey Ward. It menus celebrate the community of people & farms as well as the multi-cultural culinary influences of modern Atlanta. The restaurant closed temporarily on January 1, 2021, due to the COVID-19 pandemic.

== Notes ==
Awards and achievements
Preceded by Kristina Higgins (Resigned)	Miss Georgia; 2009	Succeeded by Christina McCauley
