= Miss Georgia's Teen =

- Formation: 2001
- Type: Beauty pageant
- Headquarters: Columbus
- Location: Georgia
- Members: Miss America's Teen
- Official language: English
- Website: Official website

The Miss Georgia's Teen competition is the pageant that selects the representative for the U.S. state of Georgia in the Miss America's Teen pageant. The pageant is held each June in Columbus, Georgia.

Melony Tidmore of Powder Springs was crowned Miss Georgia's Teen on June 20, 2026, at the RiverCenter for the Performing Arts in Columbus, Georgia. She competed for the title of Miss America's Teen 2027 on September 5, 2026, at the Kravis Center for the Performing Arts in West Palm Beach, Florida.

In January 2023, the official name of the pageant was changed from Miss Georgia’s Outstanding Teen, to Miss Georgia’s Teen, in accordance with the national pageant.

== Results summary ==
The results of Miss Georgia's Outstanding Teen as they participated in the national Miss America's Outstanding Teen competition. The year in parentheses indicates the year of the Miss America's Outstanding Teen competition the award/placement was garnered.

=== Placements ===
- Miss America's Outstanding Teen: Olivia McMillan (2015)
- 1st runners-up: Annie Swan (2018)
- 2nd runners-up: Camille Sims (2011), Kelsey Hollis (2017)
- 3rd runners-up: Jameson Kenerly (2013), Megan Wright (2022)
- 4th runners-up: Rory Pan (2019)
- Top 10: Julia Martin (2012), Victoria Smith (2016)
- Top 11: Rebecca Zhang (2023), Charlie Key (2024), Carrington Manous (2025), Raegan Khloe Moore (2026), Melony Tidmore (2027)

=== Awards ===
==== Preliminary awards ====
- Preliminary Evening Wear/On Stage Question: Annie Swan (2018) (tie), Rory Pan (2019) (tie), Megan Wright (2022)
- Preliminary Talent: Jameson Kenerly (2013), Olivia McMillan (2015), Kelsey Hollis (2017)
- Preliminary Fitness: Carrington Manous (2025)

==== Non-finalist awards ====
- Non-finalist Evening Wear/On Stage Question: Lauren Edmunds (2007)

==== Other awards ====
- Advertising Award: Jameson Kenerly (2013)
- Outstanding Achievement in Academic Life: Jameson Kenerly (2013)
- Outstanding Dance Award: Annie Swan (2018)
- Outstanding Vocalist Award: Olivia McMillan (2015), Kelsey Hollis (2017)
- Overall Dance Award: Rory Pan (2019)

== Winners ==
- Declared as winner
- Ended as a runner-up
- Ended as a finalist or semi-finalist

Year	Name	Hometown	Age	Local title	Talent	Placement at MAO Teen	Special scholarships at MAO Teen	Notes
2026	Melony Tidmore	Powder Springs	17	Miss Capital City’s Teen	Ballet en Pointe	Top 11		
2025	Raegan Khloe Moore	Powder Springs	16	Miss Northwest Georgia's Teen	Tap Dance	Top 11		
2024	Carrington Manous	Atlanta	15	Miss Cobb County's Teen	Lyrical Dance	Top 11	Preliminary Fitness Award	
2023	Charlie Key	LaGrange	17	Miss Cobb County's Teen	Vocal	Top 11		
2022	Anna Kate Robinson	Wrightsville	18	Miss Rome’s Outstanding Teen	Dance	N/A		2nd runner-up at Miss Georgia’s Outstanding Teen 2022. Assumed the title of Miss Georgia's Outstanding Teen when Zhang resigned. Top 10 at Miss Georgia 2024 and 2025. Miss Rome 2026.
2022	Rebecca Zhang	Johns Creek	18	Miss Gwinnett County's Outstanding Teen	Ballet en Pointe	Top 11		Resigned due to academic obligations on December 29, 2022
2021	Megan Wright	Calhoun	18	Miss Cobb County's Outstanding Teen	Broadway Vocal, "Astonishing" from Little Women	3rd runner-up	Preliminary Evening Wear/OSQ Award	4th Runner Up at Miss Georgia 2024. 2nd Runner Up at Miss Georgia 2025. Miss Capital City 2026.
2019-20	Mary Wilhelmina Hodges	Louisville	14	Miss Greater Atlanta’s Outstanding Teen	Tap Dance, "Boogie Shoes" by KC and The Sunshine Band			Top 15 at Miss Georgia 2022
2018	Rory Pan	Johns Creek	16	Miss Heart of Atlanta's Outstanding Teen	Ballet en Pointe, "Fire on Ice"	4th runner-up	Overall Dance Award Preliminary Evening Wear/OSQ Award (tie)	
2017	Annie Swan	Wadley	15	Miss International City's Outstanding Teen	Tap dance, "Hit the Road Jack"	1st runner-up	Outstanding Dance Award Preliminary Evening Gown/OSQ Award (tie)	
2016	Kelsey Hollis	Warner Robins	16	Miss Houston County's Outstanding Teen	Vocal	2nd runner-up	Outstanding Vocalist Award Preliminary Talent Award	2nd runner-up at Miss Georgia 2019 competition. 3rd runner-up at Miss Tennessee 2021. Miss Capital City 2022 and Miss Georgia 2022. 4th runner-up at Miss America 2023.
2015	Victoria Smith	Sandersville	17	Miss Macon's Outstanding Teen	Tap Dance, "Ease on Down the Road" from The Wiz	Top 10		
2014	Abigail Feltner	Fayetteville		Miss Starr's Mill's Outstanding Teen	Vocal	N/A		Assumed title when McMillan was named Miss America's Outstanding Teen 2015
2014	Olivia McMillan	Centerville	17	Miss Warner Robins' Outstanding Teen	Classical Vocal, "Nessun dorma" from Puccini's opera, Turandot	Winner	Outstanding Vocalist Award Preliminary Talent Award	3rd runner-up at Miss Georgia 2021
2013	Kelly Hutchinson	Marietta	15	Miss Marietta's Outstanding Teen	Dance			Miss Alabama USA 2020; 4th runner-up at Miss USA 2020 pageant
2012	Jameson Kenerly	Jesup	17	Miss Capital City's Outstanding Teen	Lyrical Twirl/Dance	3rd runner-up	Advertising Award Outstanding Achievement in Academic Life Preliminary Talent Award	Sister of Adeline Kenerly, Miss Georgia 2015
2011	Julia Martin	Marietta	16	Miss University of Georgia's Outstanding Teen	Cello	Top 10		Later Miss Georgia Teen USA 2013; 3rd runner-up at Miss Teen USA 2013 pageant
2010	Camille Sims	Atlanta	17	Miss Capital City's Outstanding Teen	Vocal	2nd runner-up		Later Miss New York 2016; 2nd runner-up at Miss America 2017 pageant
2009	Brianna Godshalk	Acworth	16	Miss Cobb County's Outstanding Teen	Violin, "Zigeunerweisen" by Pablo de Sarasate			
2008	Hilary Pulos	Jesup	13	Miss Satilla's Outstanding Teen	Dance, "It's a Spy Thing"			
2007	Michaela Lackey	Marietta	17	Miss Cobb County's Outstanding Teen	Ballet en Pointe			Later Miss Georgia 2011
2006	Lauren Edmunds	Americus		Miss Heart of Georgia's Outstanding Teen	Jazz en Pointe Dance, "I Run For Life"		Non-finalist Evening Wear/OSQ Award	1st runner-up at Miss Georgia 2008 and 2013 pageants 3rd runner-up at Miss Georgia 2012 pageant Contestant at National Sweetheart 2008 pageant
2005	Kristen Springer	Snellville	16	Miss Atlanta's Outstanding Teen	Ballet en Pointe			
2004	Mandy Best			Miss Teen Warner Robins		No national pageant		
2003	Addie Hampton	Atlanta	15	Miss Teen Cobb County	Vocal from Funny Girl	No national pageant		
2002	Diana DeGarmo	Snellville	14	Miss Teen Gwinnett County	Vocal	No national pageant		Finalist on America's Most Talented Kid 1st runner-up on 3rd season of American Idol Made Broadway debut in Hairspray in 2006 as Penny Pingleton Later appeared in 2009 Broadway revival of Hair
2001	Joanna Smith	Blakely			Vocal	No national pageant		
