= Miss Georgia (U.S. state) =

Beauty pageant competition

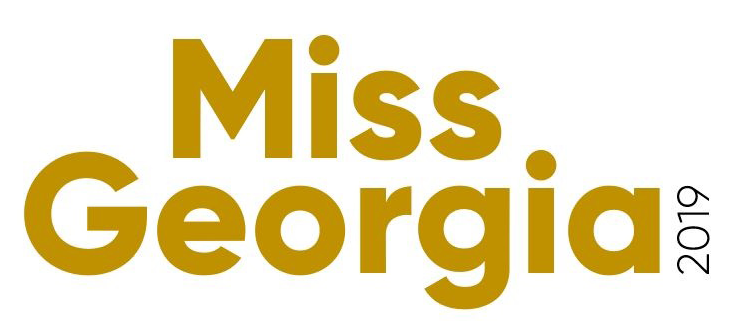
- Formation: 1922
- Type: Beauty pageant
- Headquarters: Columbus
- Location: Georgia
- Members: Miss America
- Official language: English
- Website: Official website

The Miss Georgia competition is the pageant that selects the representative for the state of Georgia in the Miss America pageant.

Georgia has won the Miss America crown twice - Neva Jane Langley of Lakeland, Florida who won the 1953 Miss America title, and in 2015, when Betty Cantrell of Warner Robins was named Miss America 2016, making her the first native-born Miss Georgia to hold the Miss America title.

In the fall of 2018, the Miss America Organization (MAO) terminated Miss Georgia organization's license as well as licenses from Florida, New Jersey, New York, Pennsylvania, Tennessee, and West Virginia. On December 22, 2018; the MAO reinstated the license for the Miss Georgia organization to Trina Pruitt.

Sophia Wootten of Peachtree City was crowned Miss Georgia on June 20, 2026, at River Center for the Performing Arts in Columbus. She competed for the title of Miss America 2027 on September 6, 2026, at the Kravis Center for the Performing Arts in West Palm Beach, Florida.

== Gallery of past titleholders ==
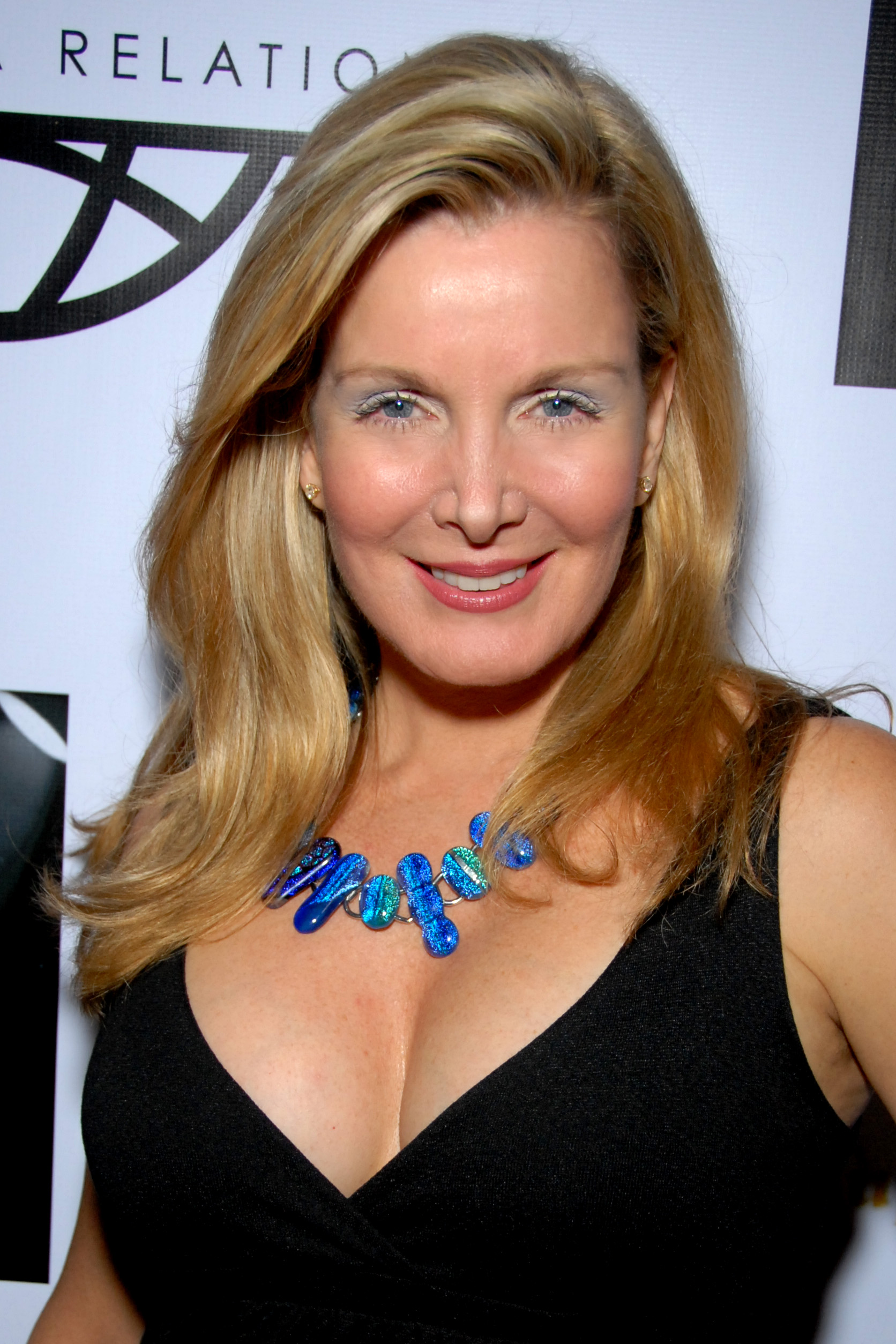
Tammy Fulwider,
Miss Georgia 1983 (in 2009)

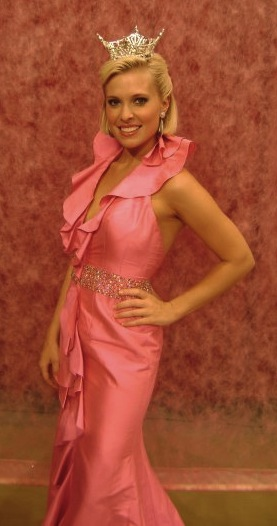
Emily Cook,
Miss Georgia 2009

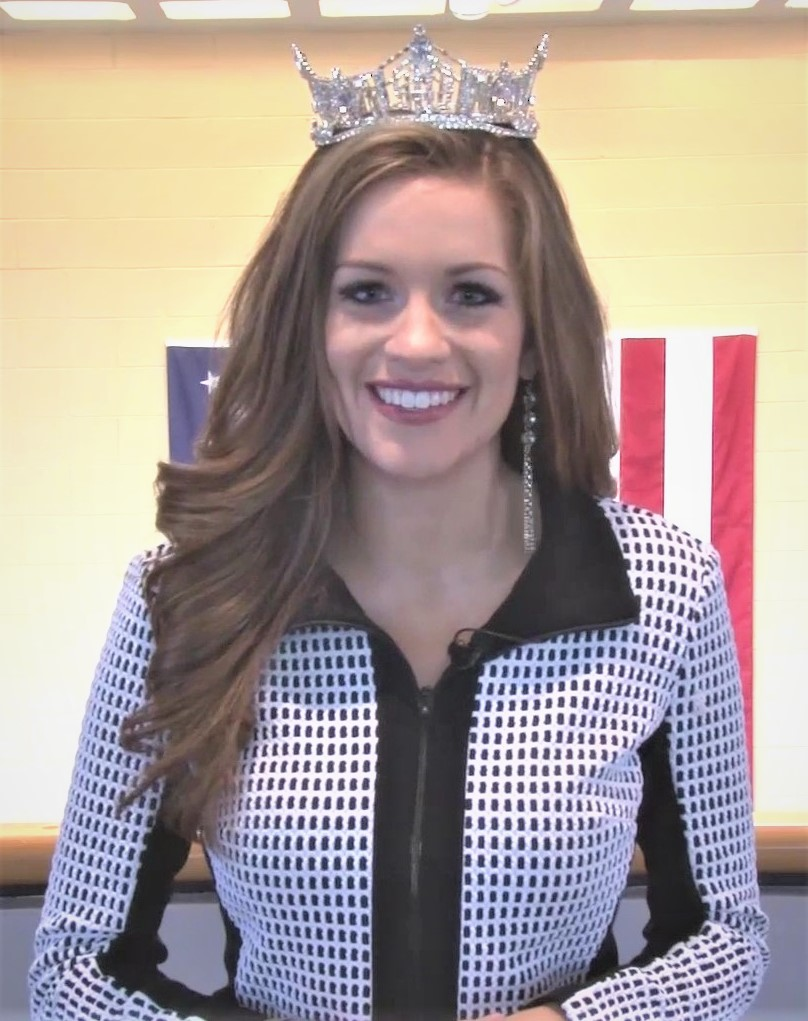
Betty Cantrell,
Miss Georgia 2015 and Miss America 2016

== Results summary ==
The following is a visual summary of the past results of Miss Georgia titleholders at the national Miss America pageants/competitions. The year in parentheses indicates the year of the national competition during which a placement and/or award was garnered, not the year attached to the contestant's state title.

=== Placements ===
- Miss Americas: Neva Jane Langley (1953), Betty Cantrell (2016)
- 1st runners-up: Jody Shattuck (1958), Kara Martin (1994), Monica Pang (2006), Chasity Hardman (2009), Victoria Hill (2020)
- 2nd runners-up: Janey Miller (1946), Kristl Evans (1982), Amanda Kozak (2007)
- 3rd runners-up: Andrea Krahn (1995), Audrey Kittila (2026)
- 4th runners-up: Kelsey Hollis (2023)
- Top 10: Estelle Bradley (1924), Jeannie Cross (1963), Cynthia Cook (1972), Bobbie Eakes (1983), Marlesa Ball (1987), Danica Tisdale (2005), Leah Massee (2008), Carly Mathis (2014)
- Top 12: Alyssa Beasley (2018)
- Top 15: Alice Talton (1938), Esther Shepard (1941), Jerry Long (1948), Andrea Bailey (2004)

=== Awards ===
==== Preliminary awards ====
- Preliminary Lifestyle and Fitness: Janey Miller (1946), Neva Jane Langley (1953), Jody Shattuck (1958), Kelly Jerles (1988), Kara Martin (1994), Emily Foster (2002), Carly Mathis (2014)
- Preliminary On Stage Interview: Victoria Hill (2020)
- Preliminary Talent: Janey Miller (1946), Neva Jane Langley (1953), Cynthia Cook (1972), Danica Tisdale (2005), Chasity Hardman (2009), Betty Cantrell (2016), Victoria Hill (2020)
- Preliminary On-Stage Question: Amy Mulkey (2003)
- Preliminary Social Impact Pitch: Kelsey Hollis (2023)

==== Non-finalist awards ====
- Non-finalist Talent: Seva Day (1976), Sandra Eakes (1980), Camille Bentley (1985), Kelly Jerles (1988), Jamie Price (1990), April Brinson (1999), Osjha Anderson (2000)
- Non-finalist Interview: Darla Pruett (tie) (1991)

==== Other awards ====
- Dr. David B. Allman Medical Scholarship: Sandy Adamson (1977), Shea Olliff (1997)
- Children's Miracle Network (CMN) Miracle Maker 1st runners-up: Maggie Bridges (2015)
- Equity and Justice 1st runner-up: Karson Pennington (2022)
- Quality of Life Award Finalists: Christina McCauley (2011), Carly Mathis (2014), Annie Jorgensen (2019), Sophia Wootten (2027)
- STEM Scholarship Award Winners: Maggie Bridges (2015)
- Women in Business Scholarship Award Winners: Patricia Ford (2017)

== Winners ==
- Declared as winner
- Ended as a runner-up
- Ended as a finalist or semi-finalist

Year	Name	Hometown	Age	Local Title	Miss America Talent	Placement at Miss America	Special scholarships at Miss America	Notes
2026	Sophia Wootten	Peachtree City	21	Miss Northwest Georgia	Contemporary Vocal		Qualify of Life Award Finalist	
2025	Audrey Kittila	Milton	22	Miss Atlanta	Violin	3rd Runner-Up		
2024	Ludwidg "Lulu" Louizaire	Rome	26	Miss Rome	Broadway Vocal, "Home"	Top 11		
2023	Tara Schiphof	King	25	Miss Capital City	Dance			
2022	Kelsey Hollis	Warner Robins	23	Miss Capital City	Vocal	4th Runner-Up	Preliminary Social Impact Pitch	Previously Miss Georgia's Outstanding Teen 2016, 2nd runner-up at Miss America's Outstanding Teen 2017
2021	Karson Pennington	Augusta	23	Miss University of Georgia	Tap Dance		Equity and Justice 1st runner-up	1st runner-up at Miss Georgia Teen USA 2016 and 4th runner-up at Miss Georgia Teen USA 2017 Later 2nd runner-up at Miss Georgia USA 2023
2020	No pageant held (Note: Pageant cancelled, no runners-up from the 2019 competition had been taking the title after state and national pageants postponed due to the COVID-19 pandemic.)							
2019	Victoria Hill	Canton	20	Miss Capital City	Classical Vocal, "Chacun le sait" from La fille du régiment	1st runner-up	Preliminary On Stage Interview Award Preliminary Talent Award	
2018	Annie Jorgensen	Athens	22	Miss International City	Jazz Dance, "Feeling Good" by Michael Bublé		Quality of Life Award Finalist	Previously Miss Wisconsin's Outstanding Teen 2011 Previously Miss High School America 2013 Later a contestant on season 3 of Joe Millionaire
2017	Alyssa Beasley	Brunswick	19	Miss Southeast Georgia	Lyrical Dance, "When Your Feet Don't Touch the Ground"	Top 12		Later Miss Georgia USA 2020; Top 16 at Miss USA 2020 pageant
2016	Patricia Ford	Johns Creek	22	Miss Capital City	Ballet en Pointe, "Explosive" by Bond		Women in Business Scholarship Award	1st runner-up at National Sweetheart 2015 pageant
2015	Adeline Kenerly	Jesup	21	Miss Capital City	Dance/Twirl	Did not compete; originally 1st runner-up, later assumed the title after Cantrell won Miss America 2016		
2015	Betty Cantrell	Warner Robins	20	Miss Warner Robins	Classical Vocal, "Tu Tu Piccolo Iddio" from Madame Butterfly	Winner	Preliminary Talent Award	Later a contestant on season 20 of American Idol
2014	Maggie Bridges	Brinson	21	Miss Capital City	Vocal, "Bridge over Troubled Water"		CMN Miracle Maker 1st runner-up STEM Scholarship Award	
2013	Carly Mathis	Leesburg	22	Miss Atlanta	Vocal, "On My Own"	Top 10	Preliminary Swimsuit Award	Contestant at National Sweetheart 2012 pageant
2012	Leighton Jordan	Suwanee	19	Miss Capital City	Ballet en Pointe, "Malagueña"			
2011	Michaela Lackey	Marietta	21	Miss Heart of Lakes	Classical Ballet En Pointe, "Tournament Gallop" by Louis Moreau Gottschalk			Previously Miss Georgia's Outstanding Teen 2007
2010	Christina McCauley	Marietta	21	Miss Southern Heartland	Classical Vocal, "Der Hölle Rache kocht in meinem Herzen"		Quality of Life Award Finalist	
2009	Emily Cook	Marietta	21	Miss Cobb County	Oboe, Gershwin's Prelude No. 1			1st runner-up at Miss Georgia 2009 pageant, assumed title when Higgins resigned; Competed at Miss America 2010 pageant but did not place
2009	Kristina Higgins	Dacula	24	Miss Capital City		N/A		Higgins resigned her title of Miss Georgia 2009 due to her responsibilities as a middle school teacher after reigning for 12 hours; Did not compete at Miss America 2010 pageant
2008	Chasity Hardman	Columbus	24	Miss Capital City	Vocal, "Home" from The Wiz	1st runner-up	Preliminary Talent Award	Received a "Golden Sash" and automatic Top 15 placement at Miss America 2009 pageant on Miss America: Countdown to the Crown
2007	Leah Massee	Fitzgerald	24	Miss Capital City	Vocal, "If I Had My Way"	Top 10		
2006	Amanda Kozak	Warner Robins	22	Miss Valdosta	Tap Dance, "Baby I'm a Star"	2nd runner-up		1st runner-up at National Sweetheart 2005 pageant Later Miss Georgia USA 2008
2005	Monica Pang	Atlanta	25	Miss Lake Lanier	Classical Piano, "Polonaise in G Sharp Minor" by Frédéric Chopin	1st runner-up		Previously National Sweetheart 2004
2004	Danica Tisdale	Atlanta	24	Miss Atlanta	Vocal, "Please Send Me Someone to Love"	Top 10	Preliminary Talent Award	
2003	Andrea Bailey	Evans	24	Miss Savannah	Vocal, "Sometimes I Dream"	Top 15		Previously National Sweetheart 1999
2002	Amy Mulkey	Gainesville	23	Miss Atlanta	Classical Piano, "Toccata" by Aram Khachaturian		Preliminary On-Stage Question Award	
2001	Emily Foster	Cornelia	23	Miss Northwest Georgia	Piano, "Majesty"		Preliminary Swimsuit Award	
2000	Pamela Kennedy	LaGrange	23	Miss Atlanta	Vocal, "Vienna"			
1999	Osjha Anderson	Glennville	24	Miss University of Georgia	Vocal, "Can't Help Lovin' Dat Man"		Non-finalist Talent Award	
1998	April Brinson	Bainbridge	20	Miss Greater Southwest Georgia	Vocal, "Tell Him"		Non-finalist Talent Award	
1997	Candice Little	Hartwell	23	Miss Lake Lanier	Tap Dance, "Jump 'N Jive"			
1996	Shea Olliff	Augusta	24	Miss Northeast Georgia	Popular Vocal, "Can You Read My Mind"		Dr. David B. Allman Medical Scholarship	
1995	Rachel English	Thomaston	21	Miss University of Georgia	Tap Dance, "It Don't Mean a Thing (If It Ain't Got That Swing)"			
1994	Andrea Krahn	Calhoun	20	Miss West Coast Georgia	Vocal, "I Fall to Pieces"	3rd runner-up		1st runner-up at Miss Georgia 1994 pageant, assumed title when Grogan resigned; Competed at Miss America 1995 pageant and placed as 3rd runner-up
1994	Joanne Grogan	Marietta	21	Miss University of Georgia		N/A		Resigned within 24 hours of winning title to pursue career opportunities; Did not compete at Miss America 1995 pageant Currently a meteorologist for Fox 5 Atlanta under her married name, Joanne Feldman
1993	Kara Martin	Statesboro	23	Miss Southeast Georgia	Tap Dance, "Mack the Knife"	1st runner-up	Preliminary Swimsuit Award	Contestant at National Sweetheart 1991 pageant
1992	Stephanie Michels	Marietta	24	Miss Southeast Georgia	Vocal / Dance, "The Phantom of the Opera"			Appeared in Broadway productions of The Life and Contact
1991	Kimberly Hardee	Lilburn	20	Miss Stone Mountain	Vocal selections from The Phantom of the Opera			Reality TV pageant coach on Lifetime's Kim of Queens
1990	Darla Pruett	Canton	22	Miss Northeast Georgia	Vocal, "Some Enchanted Evening" from South Pacific		Non-finalist Interview Award (tie)	
1989	Jamie Price	Tucker	22	Miss DeKalb County	Popular Vocal, "When You Wish upon a Star"		Non-finalist Talent Award	
1988	Frances Woodbury Frazier	Rome	26	Miss Peachtree City	Popular Vocal, "Amen"			Shed died at age 28 on May 8, 1991, after having a heart attack during a workout at a local gym.
1987	Kelly Ann Jerles	Perry	20	Miss Cobb County	Vocal, "Where the Boys Are"		Non-finalist Talent Award Preliminary Swimsuit Award	Previously Miss Georgia Teen USA 1983; 3rd runner-up at Miss Teen USA 1983 pageant
1986	Marlesa Ball	Thomasville	23	Miss Southeast Georgia	Vocal, "Amazing Grace"	Top 10		
1985	Samantha Mohr	Columbus	23	Miss Columbus	Popular Vocal, "Wind Beneath My Wings"			
1984	Camille Bentley	Thomasville	19	Miss Thomasville	Popular Vocal, "Until Now"		Non-finalist Talent Award	
1983	Tammy Fulwider	Columbus	24	Miss Southeast Georgia	Tap Dance / Vocal, "42nd Street"			
1982	Bobbie Eakes	Warner Robins	21	Miss University of Georgia	Vocal, "Let's Hear It For Me" from Funny Lady	Top 10		Miss Georgia T.E.E.N. 1979 Sister of Miss Georgia 1979, Sandra Eakes; Later starred as Macy Alexander on The Bold and the Beautiful
1981	Kristl Ann Evans	Atlanta	21	Miss West Central Georgia	Vocal, "Ring Them Bells"	2nd runner-up		
1980	Lynn Smith	Savannah	23	Miss Savannah	Vocal Medley, "Get Happy" & "Hallelujah"			
1979	Sandra Eakes	Warner Robins	22	Miss Macon	Popular Vocal, "The Trolley Song" & "Rock-a-Bye Your Baby with a Dixie Melody"		Non-finalist Talent Award	Sister of Miss Georgia 1982, Bobbie Eakes
1978	Deborah Mosely	Atlanta	21	Miss Dekalb County	Vocal, "Summertime" & "I Got Plenty of Nothing" from Porgy and Bess			
1977	Pam Souders	Thomasville	18	Miss Thomasville	Classical Vocal, "Sempre Libera" from La traviata			
1976	Sandy Adamson	Atlanta	20	Miss South Cobb	Tap Dance, "I Can Do That"		Dr. David B. Allman Medical Scholarship	
1975	Seva Day	Thomasville	19	Miss Thomasville	Vocal, "My Man"		Non-finalist Talent Award	
1974	Gail Nelson	Atlanta	22	Miss Atlanta	Vocal Medley, "So Long, Dearie," "Put on Your Sunday Clothes," & "Before the Parade Passes By" from Hello, Dolly!			
1973	Gail Bullock	Thomasville	19	Miss West Georgia College	Ballet, Theme from Summer of '42			
1972	Lisa Lawalin	Rome	20	Miss Cedar Valley	Vocal, "I Could Have Danced All Night" from My Fair Lady			
1971	Cynthia Cook	Smyrna	20	Miss Cobb County	Ventriloquist Act, Singing & Interpretations	Top 10	Preliminary Talent Award	
1970	Nancy Carr	Midland	22	Miss Hamilton on the Square	Popular Vocal, "I Wish You Love"			
1969	Marilyn Olley	Marietta	19	Miss Cobb County	Dramatic Interpretation & Dance, Music from Romeo and Juliet			
1968	Burma Davis	Warner Robins	20	Miss Warner Robins	Vocal, "This Is My Country"			
1967	Sandra McRee	Atlanta	19	Miss Atlanta	Classical Vocal, "Caro Mio Ben"			
1966	Maudie Walker	Tifton	20	Miss Tifton	Interpretive Dance			
1965	Mary Jane Yates	Savannah	20	Miss Coffee County	Semi-classical Vocal, "With a Song In My Heart"			
1964	Vivian Davis	Augusta	19	Miss Augusta	Skit & Vocal			
1963	Nancy Middleton	Macon		Miss Macon	Semi-classical Vocal			
1962	Jeannie Cross	Albany	18	Miss Albany	Jazz Dance	Top 10		
1961	Glenda Lee Brunson	Savannah	18	Miss Savannah	Spanish Dance			
1960	Sandra Tally	Homerville	18	Miss Pierce County	Piano, "Deep Purple"			
1959	Kayanne Shoffner	Calhoun	19	Miss Gordon County	Dramatic Reading			
1958	Jeanette Ardell	Marietta	18	Miss Cobb County	Archery			
1957	Jody Shattuck	Atlanta	20	Miss Athens	Vocal & Dance "Namely You" from Li'l Abner	1st runner-up	Preliminary Swimsuit Award	
1956	Jane Morris	East Point	18	Miss East Point	Ballet			
1955	Jeanine Parris	Atlanta	22	Miss Glenwood	Dramatic Monologue			
1954	Mary Jane Doar	Macon	19	Miss Macon	Vocal Medley of songs by George Gershwin			
1953	Lucia Hutchinson	Macon	22	Miss Macon	Operatic Vocal, "Mon cœur s'ouvre à ta voix" from Samson et Dalila & "Love Is Where You Find It" from The Kissing Bandit			
1952	Neva Jane Langley	Macon	19	Miss Macon	Classical Piano, "Toccata"	Winner	Preliminary Swimsuit Award Preliminary Talent Award	
1951	Carol Frances Taylor	Alma	20		Monologue			
1950	Louise Thomas	Fitzgerald		Miss Fitzgerald				
1949	Dorothy Jeanne Johnston	LaGrange	18	Miss Troup County	Vocal from H.M.S. Pinafore			
1948	Jerry Long	Atlanta		Miss Atlanta	Tap Dance, "Cherokee"	Top 15		Multiple Georgia representatives Competed under local title at Miss America pageant
1948	Gwendolyn West	Statesboro		Miss Georgia				Multiple Georgia representatives Competed under local title at Miss America pageant
1947	Joy Elizabeth Smith	Atlanta		Miss Atlanta	Vocal, "Eccentric Dance"			Multiple Georgia representatives Competed under local title at Miss America pageant
1947	Robbie Sauls	Cuthbert		Miss Georgia	Vocal, "Smilin' Through"			Multiple Georgia representatives Competed under local title at Miss America pageant
1946	Janey Miller	Atlanta		Miss Atlanta	Classical Vocal, "Vissi d'arte"	2nd runner-up	Preliminary Swimsuit Award Preliminary Talent Award	Multiple Georgia representatives Competed under local title at Miss America pageant
1946	Mary Lou Henderson	Columbus		Miss Columbus				Multiple Georgia representatives Competed under local title at Miss America pageant
1945	Pauline Walker			Miss Atlanta				Multiple Georgia representatives Competed under local title at Miss America pageant
1945	Doris Coker	Columbus		Miss Columbus	Vocal, "Candy"			Multiple Georgia representatives Competed under local title at Miss America pageant
1944	Mary Ann Linane			Miss Atlanta				Multiple Georgia representatives Competed under local title at Miss America pageant
1944	Trudie Hayward	Atlanta		Miss Georgia				Multiple Georgia representatives Competed under local title at Miss America pageant
1943	Barbara Britton			Miss Atlanta				Competed under local title at Miss America pageant
1942	No Georgia representative at Miss America pageant							
1941	Esther Shepard	Griffin		Miss Georgia		Top 15		Multiple Georgia representatives Competed under local title at Miss America pageant
1941	Gladys Collins	Savannah		Miss Savannah				Multiple Georgia representatives Competed under local title at Miss America pageant
1940	No Georgia representative at Miss America pageant							
1939	Mary Durrance	Glennville		Miss Georgia	Vocal			Competed under local title at Miss America pageant
1938	Alice Talton	Atlanta		Miss Atlanta		Top 15		Competed under local title at Miss America pageant
1937	Lorraine Mayfield	Atlanta		Miss Atlanta				Multiple Georgia representatives Competed under local title at Miss America pageant
1937	Olga Strickland			Miss Augusta				Multiple Georgia representatives Competed under local title at Miss America pageant
1937	Carolyn Cumbie			Miss Savannah Beach				Multiple Georgia representatives Competed under local title at Miss America pageant
1936	Ora York	Atlanta		Miss Atlanta				Multiple Georgia representatives Competed under local title at Miss America pageant
1936	Hilda Veale	Watkinsville		Miss Georgia				Multiple Georgia representatives Competed under local title at Miss America pageant
1935	LaRue Wilson	Atlanta		Miss Atlanta				Competed under local title at Miss America pageant
1934	No national pageant was held							
1933	No Georgia representative at Miss America pageant							
1932	No national pageants were held							
1931	No national pageants were held							
1930	No national pageants were held							
1929	No national pageants were held							
1928	No national pageants were held							
1927	No Georgia representative at Miss America pageant							
1926	No Georgia representative at Miss America pageant							
1925	No Georgia representative at Miss America pageant							
1924	Estelle Bradley			Miss Atlanta	N/A	Top 10		Competed under local title at national pageant
1924	Anne Davis			Miss Columbus	N/A			Competed under local title at national pageant
1923	Frances Thayer	Atlanta		Miss Atlanta	N/A			Competed under local title at national pageant
1922	Frances Gurr	Macon		Miss Macon	N/A			Competed under local title at national pageant
1921	No Georgia representative at Miss America pageant							
