= Larry Lawrence (basketball) =

American-French basketball player (born 1959)

Personal information
- Born: January 25, 1959 (age 67) Macon, Georgia, U.S.
- Listed height: 6 ft 5 in (1.96 m)
- Listed weight: 200 lb (91 kg)

Career information
- High school: Mount de Sales Academy (Macon, Georgia)
- College: Dartmouth (1977–1981)
- NBA draft: 1980: 8th round, 175th overall pick
- Drafted by: Atlanta Hawks
- Playing career: 1982–2000
- Position: Small forward
- Number: 6

Career history
- 1981–1983: Rochester Zeniths
- 1983–1985: Puerto Rico Coquis
- 1985–1988: BCM Gravelines
- 1988–1991: Le Mans
- 1991–1992: BCM Gravelines
- 1992–1993: Saint-Quentin
- 1993–1994: ALM Évreux
- 1994–1995: Étendard de Brest
- 1995–1996: Tourcoing
- 1996–1997: JA Vichy
- 1998–2000: SLUC Nancy

Career highlights
- LNB Pro B Best Scorer (1989); CBA All-Defensive First Team (1985); CBA All-Defensive Second Team (1984); AP honorable mention All-American (1981); Ivy League Player of the Year (1981); 2× First-team All-Ivy League (1979, 1981)

Larry O'Neal Lawrence (born January 25, 1959) is an American-French former basketball player who spent 18 years playing professionally after a successful collegiate career at Dartmouth College. He was the 1981 Ivy League Player of the Year. Lawrence was born and raised in Macon, Georgia, United States.

== Basketball career ==
=== College ===
After graduating from Mount de Sales Academy in Macon, where he was an all-state basketball player, Lawrence received an academic scholarship to play for Dartmouth College in Hanover, New Hampshire. He graduated high school at age 16 so he sat out his first two years at Dartmouth, eventually joining the varsity squad in his redshirt sophomore season of 1977–78. In his first collegiate season, Lawrence averaged 8.0 points, 4.4 rebounds, and 2.1 assists per game.

As a junior in 1978–79, the small forward led Dartmouth in points (16.3) and rebounds (7.5) en route to a spot on the All-Ivy League First Team. The following year, he was named a team captain but he broke his foot, which sidelined him for the entire 1979–80 season.

During Lawrence's final season in 1980–81, he led not only the Big Green in scoring (21.4) but the entire Ivy League as well, while his 8.7 rebounds were also a team-high. Lawrence became the first Dartmouth player in history to win the Ivy League Player of the Year award. He earned a second All-Ivy League First Team selection, and the Associated Press tabbed him as an Honorable Mention All-American. Lawrence finished his career with 1,122 points, good for 10th in school history at the time of his graduation.

=== Professional ===
In June 1980, after the season ended in which Lawrence sat out due to the broken foot, the NBA's Atlanta Hawks selected him in the 1980 NBA draft in the eight round (175th overall). Lawrence opted to return to school, making him an ineligible draftee.

From 1981 until 2000, Lawrence's professional career saw him play in the Continental Basketball Association (CBA) and various leagues in France. He was selected to the CBA All-Defensive First Team in 1985 and Second Team in 1984. He won two championships overseas, and in 1988–89 he led LNB Pro B in scoring with 32.4 points per game. He acquired French nationality in March 1998.

== Later life ==
According to a January 2023 Ivy League profile on him, "While still in France, Lawrence founded a charity, 'Les Enfants de la Terre' (Children of the Earth), dedicated to helping underprivileged youths in orphanages across France. He continues his charitable work to this day, having served on the Board of Directors of the Network for Teaching Entrepreneurship and currently sitting on the board of the Black Heart Foundation."

Upon returning to the United States, Lawrence pivoted into a successful career in finance. He stayed in that industry in various capacities until September 2023, when he moved into information technology as a Senior Account Manager for Arteria AI. Lawrence and his wife Arlene have a son, Lawrence Jr., and a daughter, Alyssa.
