= Miss America 2015 =

88th edition of the Miss America competition

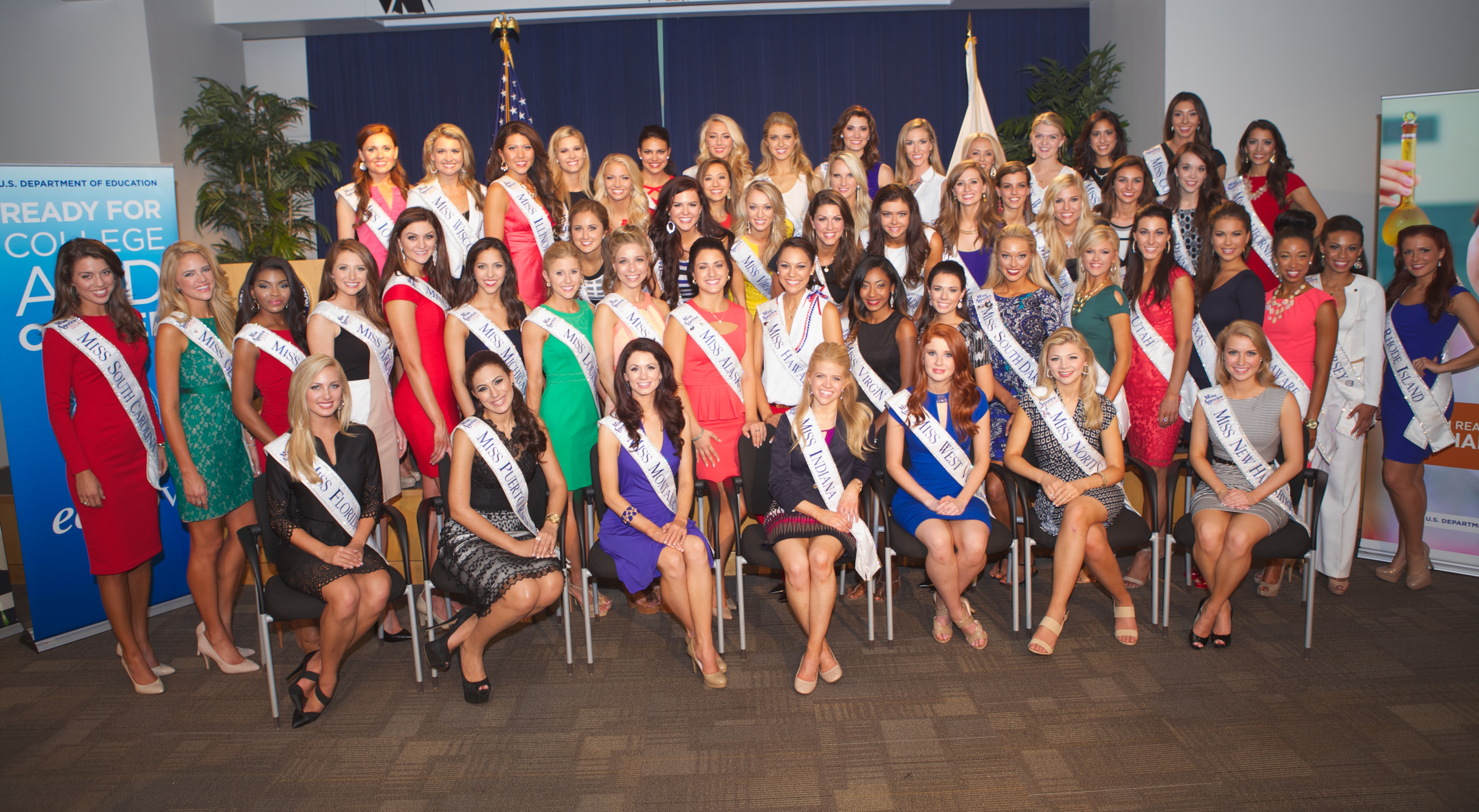
- Date: September 14, 2014
- Presenters: Chris Harrison; Lara Spencer
- Venue: Boardwalk Hall, Atlantic City, New Jersey
- Broadcaster: ABC
- Entrants: 53
- Placements: 16
- Winner: Kira Kazantsev; New York
- Congeniality: Jacky Arness, North Dakota

Miss America 2015 was the 88th Miss America pageant, held at the Boardwalk Hall in Atlantic City, New Jersey, on September 14, 2014.

Nina Davuluri of New York crowned Kira Kazantsev of New York as her successor at the end of the event, making it the third consecutive year that a Miss New York won the Miss America crown; New York thus became the first state to have a Miss America winner three years in a row.

== Results ==
=== Placements ===
Placement	Contestant
Miss America 2015	New York – Kira Kazantsev
1st Runner-Up	Virginia – Courtney Garrett
2nd Runner-Up	Arkansas – Ashton Campbell
3rd Runner-Up	Florida – Victoria Cowen
4th Runner-Up	Massachusetts – Lauren Kuhn
Top 10	Alabama – Caitlin Brunell; Mississippi – Jasmine Murray; Ohio – Mackenzie Bart; Oklahoma – Alexandra Eppler; Tennessee – Hayley Lewis
Top 12	Iowa – Alysa Olson; Kentucky – Ramsey Carpenter
Top 16	Connecticut – Acacia Courtney; Idaho – Sierra Sandison §; North Dakota – Jacky Arness ∆; Texas – Monique Evans

§ - America's Choice

∆ - Judge's Choice

=== Awards ===
==== Preliminary awards ====
Awards	Contestant
Lifestyle and Fitness	Florida - Victoria Cowen; Maryland - Jade Kenny; Oklahoma - Alexandra Eppler
Talent	Kentucky - Ramsey Carpenter; Ohio - Mackenzie Bart; Pennsylvania - Amanda Smith

== Contestants ==
53 contestants competed for the title.

State	Name	Hometown	Age	Talent	Placement	Awards	Notes
Alabama	Caitlin Brunell	Tuscaloosa	22	Dance "Let It Go" from Frozen	Top 10	Quality of Life Award Winner	Daughter of former NFL quarterback, Mark Brunell Previously Miss Virginia's Outstanding Teen 2007; Crowned Miss America's Outstanding Teen 2008
Alaska	Malie Delgado	Anchorage	19	Vocal			Contestant on The Price is Right, American Idol and The X Factor
Arizona	Alexa Rogers	Scottsdale	23	Dance			
Arkansas	Ashton Campbell	Hindsville	20	Vocal "Via Dolorosa"	2nd runner-up		Previously Miss Arkansas's Outstanding Teen 2011
California	Marina Inserra	San Diego	24	Vocal "Bring Him Home"			
Colorado	Stacey Cook	Littleton	23	Tahitian Dance "Runaway Baby"			Contestant at National Sweetheart 2012
Connecticut	Acacia Courtney	Hamden	21	Ballet en Pointe "Kitri's Variations" from Don Quixote	Top 16		Previously Miss Connecticut's Outstanding Teen 2009; Later Miss Connecticut USA 2019; Currently a TV reporter and paddock analyst for Gulfstream Park
Delaware	Brittany Lewis	Wilmington, Brigantine, NJ	24	Jazz Dance		Quality of Life Award 1st runner-up	1st runner-up at Miss Delaware 2014; Assumed title when Amanda Longacre was dethroned
(Washington, D.C.) District of Columbia	Teresa Davis	Hoschton, GA	23	Piano "Malaguena"			Born in South Korea
Florida	Victoria Cowen	Panama City	21	Dance "Note to God"	3rd runner-up	Preliminary Lifestyle & Fitness Award	Thought to be 1st runner-up at Miss Florida 2014; Assumed title one week later due to miscount on tabulation
(Georgia (U.S. state)) Georgia	Maggie Bridges	Brinson	21	Vocal "Bridge Under Troubled Water"		STEM Scholarship Award	
Hawaii	Stephanie Steuri	Kalaheo	20	Hula "The Prayer"			Mother competed as Miss Maui at Miss Hawaii 1977
Idaho	Sierra Sandison	Twin Falls	20	Vocal	Top 16 (America's Choice)		Is a Type 1 diabetic 1st runner-up at Miss Idaho USA 2021 competition
Illinois	Marisa Buchheit	Chicago	24	Operatic Vocal "Je veux vivre" from Roméo et Juliette			1st runner-up at Miss Illinois USA 2018 competition
Indiana	Audra Casterline	Fishers	23	Vocal "Over the Rainbow"		Non-finalist Talent Award	Contestant at National Sweetheart 2012
Iowa	Alysa Lou Olson	Des Moines	21	Vocal "If I Loved You" from Carousel / Vocal "How Will I Ever Know"	Top 12		Previously Miss Iowa's Outstanding Teen 2010
Kansas	Amanda Sasek	Moberly, MO	23	Vocal "I Don't Know My Own Strength" / Vocal "You Haven't Seen the Last of Me"		Quality of Life Award Finalist	
Kentucky	Ramsey Carpenter	Hartford	23	Fiddle "Sally Goodin'" and "Orange Blossom Special"	Top 12	Preliminary Talent Award	Diagnosed with multiple sclerosis in 2012
Louisiana	Lacey Sanchez	Baton Rouge	24	Vocal		Non-finalist Interview Award	
Maine	Audrey Thames	Topsham	18	Comedic Monologue "Yma Dream"			
Maryland	Jade Kenny	Madison	23	Contemporary Ballet en Pointe "Everybody Dance Now"		Preliminary Lifestyle & Fitness Award Quality of Life Award 2nd runner-up	Washington Redskins cheerleader Semifinalist at Miss District of Columbia USA 2018; 3rd runner-up at Miss Virginia USA 2019
Massachusetts	Lauren Kuhn	Boston / Aberdeen, WA	23	Piano "Valse Dramatico" by Melody Bober	4th runner-up	STEM Scholarship Award	
Michigan	Kaitlyn Maviglia	Dundee	21	Dance "Be Italian" from Nine			Diagnosed with Sensorineural hearing loss at age 9
Minnesota	Savannah Cole	Brainerd	18	Vocal "Somebody to Love" by Queen / Vocal "House of the Rising Sun"			
Mississippi	Jasmine Murray	Columbus	22	Vocal "Something's Got a Hold on Me"	Top 10	Quality of Life Award Finalist	Previously Miss Mississippi's Outstanding Teen 2007; Top 10 at Miss America's Outstanding Teen 2008 American Idol season 8 finalist
Missouri	Jessica Hartman	Pueblo, CO	23	Dance "Steppin' Out with My Baby"			Previously Miss Colorado USA 2010; 3rd runner-up at Miss USA 2010 pageant Miss Intercontinental 2011 representing United States
Montana	Victoria Valentine	Missoula	22	Vocal "Danny Boy" and accompanied herself on the harp / Vocal & Harp "I Won't Give Up" (at Preliminaries)			Previously Miss Montana's Outstanding Teen 2008
Nebraska	Megan Swanson	Omaha	21	Vocal "You Raise Me Up"		Quality of Life Award Finalist	Later Miss Nebraska USA 2020
Nevada	Ellie Smith	Henderson	17	Vocal "Somebody to Love"		Non-finalist Talent Award	Sister of Miss Nevada's Outstanding Teen 2014, Amy Smith Previously Miss Nevada's Outstanding Teen 2012
New Hampshire	Megan Cooley	Auburn	19	Vocal "On My Way" written by Ali Tamposi and Fernando Garibay			
New Jersey	Cierra Kaler-Jones	Galloway	21	Dance "Listen" by Beyoncé		Quality of Life Award Finalist	Born with hip dysplasia
New Mexico	Jessica Burson	Roswell	20	Jazz Dance "Steam Heat" from 1954 Broadway musical The Pajama Game, written by Richard Adler and Jerry Ross		STEM Scholarship Award	
(New York (state)) New York	Kira Kazantsev	Manhattan	23	Vocal with Cup Percussion "Happy" by Pharrell Williams	Miss America 2015		Previously Miss California Jr. and Miss California Preteen
North Carolina	Beth Stovall	Goldsboro	20	Classical Vocal "Chi Bel Sogno di Doretta"		Non-finalist Talent Award	
North Dakota	Jacky Arness	Fargo	21	Vocal "Feeling Good" written by English songwriters Anthony Newley and Leslie Bricusse	Top 16 (Judges' Choice)	Miss Congeniality	Previously North Dakota's Junior Miss 2011; Top 10 at Miss America's Junior Miss 2011; 1st runner-up at Miss North Dakota USA 2018 pageant
Ohio	Mackenzie Victoria Bart	Columbus	22	Ventriloquism "Supercalifragilisticexpialidocious" from Mary Poppins	Top 10	Preliminary Talent Award STEM Scholarship Award	Contestant on Funny or Die Presents: America's Next Weatherman
Oklahoma	Alexandra Eppler	Edmond	24	Dance "Wonderland" / Dance "Titanium" (at Preliminaries)	Top 10	Preliminary Lifestyle & Fitness Award Quality of Life Award Finalist	
Oregon	Rebecca Anderson	Oregon City	23	Vocal			
Pennsylvania	Amanda Fallon Smith	Dade City, FL	21	Vocal "Wishing You Were Somewhere Here Again" from The Phantom of the Opera		Non-finalist Talent Award Preliminary Talent Award	
Puerto Rico	Yarelis Salgado	Toa Alta	20	Flamenco Fusion			Later Miss International Puerto Rico 2018
Rhode Island	Ivy DePew	Providence	23	Flute "Devil Went Down to Georgia" by the Charlie Daniels Band			Contestant at National Sweetheart 2013
South Carolina	Lanie Hudson	Spartanburg	23	Clogging "Think" by Aretha Franklin			Competed on America's Got Talent with dance troupe
South Dakota	Meridith Gould	Sioux Falls	19	Dance en Pointe "Hedwig's Theme"			Previously Miss South Dakota's Outstanding Teen 2012 Later Miss Minnesota USA 2017 and 2nd runner-up at Miss USA 2017
Tennessee	Hayley Lewis	Nashville/ Independence, MO	21	Vocal "I (Who Have Nothing)"	Top 10		
Texas	Monique Evans	Austin	22	Ballet en Pointe "Requiem for a Tower"	Top 16		Later Miss Florida USA 2020
Utah	Karlie Major	Logan	20	Dance "Forget About the Boy" from Thoroughly Modern Millie			
Vermont	Lucy Edwards	Burlington	19	Vocal "I Am Changing" from the Dreamgirls cast album / Vocal "You'll Never Walk Alone"		STEM Scholarship Award	
(United States Virgin Islands) Virgin Islands	Ashley Gabriel	Orlando, FL	19	Vocal "Rolling in the Deep" by Adele			
Virginia	Courtney Paige Garrett	Pamplin	21	Opera (Classical Vocal) "Parla Piu Piano" from The Godfather	1st runner-up	Quality of Life Award Finalist	Previously Miss Virginia's Outstanding Teen 2009; Top 10 at Miss America's Outstanding Teen 2010
(Washington (state)) Washington	Kailee Dunn	Kennewick	22	Vocal "Someone Like You"			
West Virginia	Paige Madden	Moundsville	21	Vocal "Gravity"		Non-finalist Talent Award	
Wisconsin	Raeanna Mary Johnson	Holmen	24	Dance "Hallelujah" by Alexandra Burke			First woman to hold the Miss Wisconsin title two times; she had previously held the 2011 title after Laura Kaeppeler was crowned Miss America 2012 3rd runner-up at National Sweetheart 2011
Wyoming	Jessie Allen	Lander	24	Dance			Younger sister of Miss Wyoming USA 2012, Holly Allen And on Big brother 21
