= List of University of Massachusetts Amherst alumni =

University of Massachusetts Amherst alumni numbered around 243,628 worldwide, as 2014.

== Academy Award winners ==
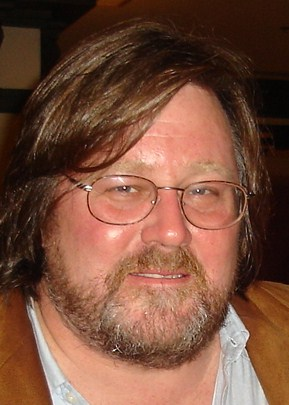
William Monahan

- William Monahan, for adapted screenplay, The Departed
- Buffy Sainte-Marie, for best song, "Up Where We Belong" from An Officer and a Gentleman

== Emmy Award winners ==
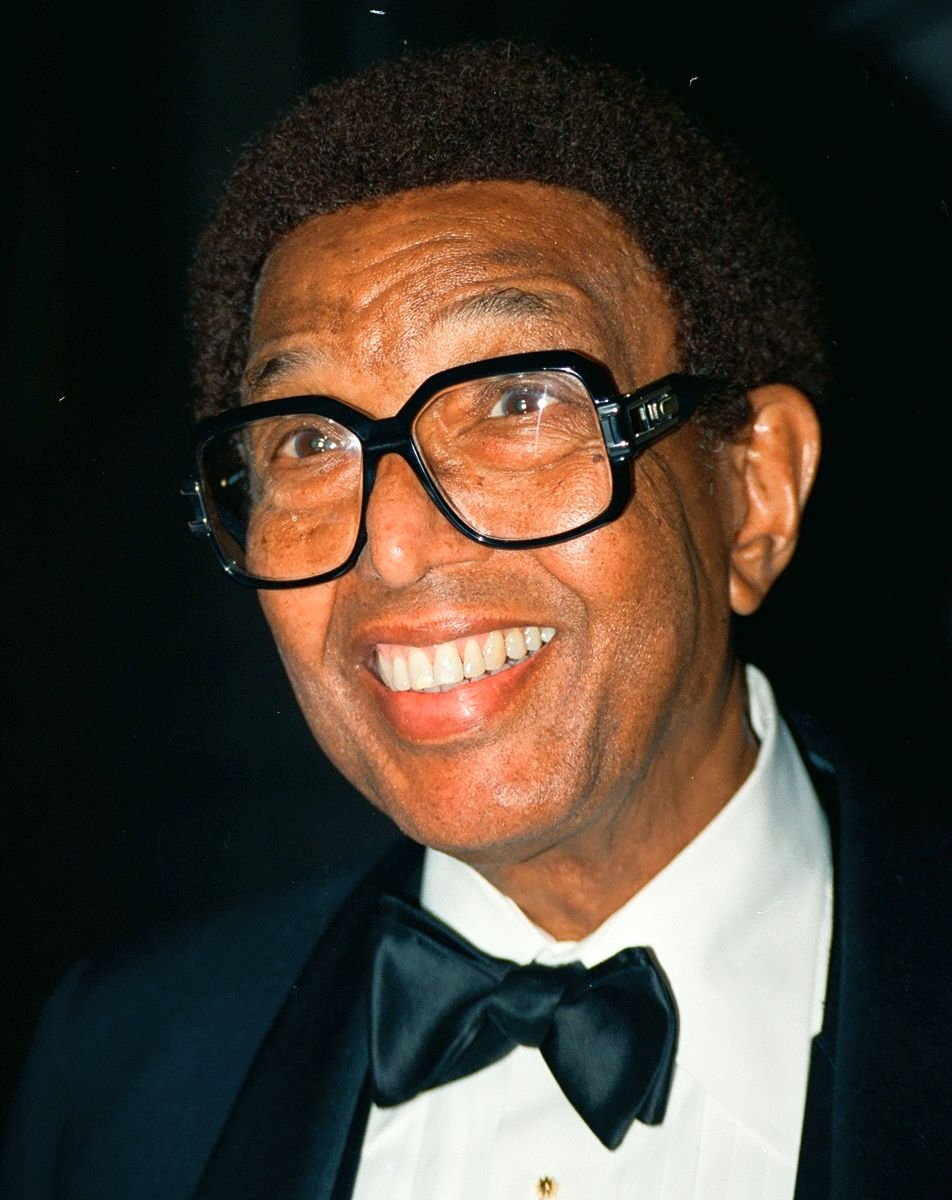
Billy Taylor

- Ed Christie 1979, BFA, art director/designer for The Jim Henson Company and Sesame Street
- Billy Taylor MA, PhD, musician, music educator

== Grammy Award winners ==
- Natalie Cole 1972, singer
- Yusef Lateef 1975, composer
- Billy Taylor MA, PhD, composer
- Brian Vibberts, audio engineer

== Nobel Prize winner ==
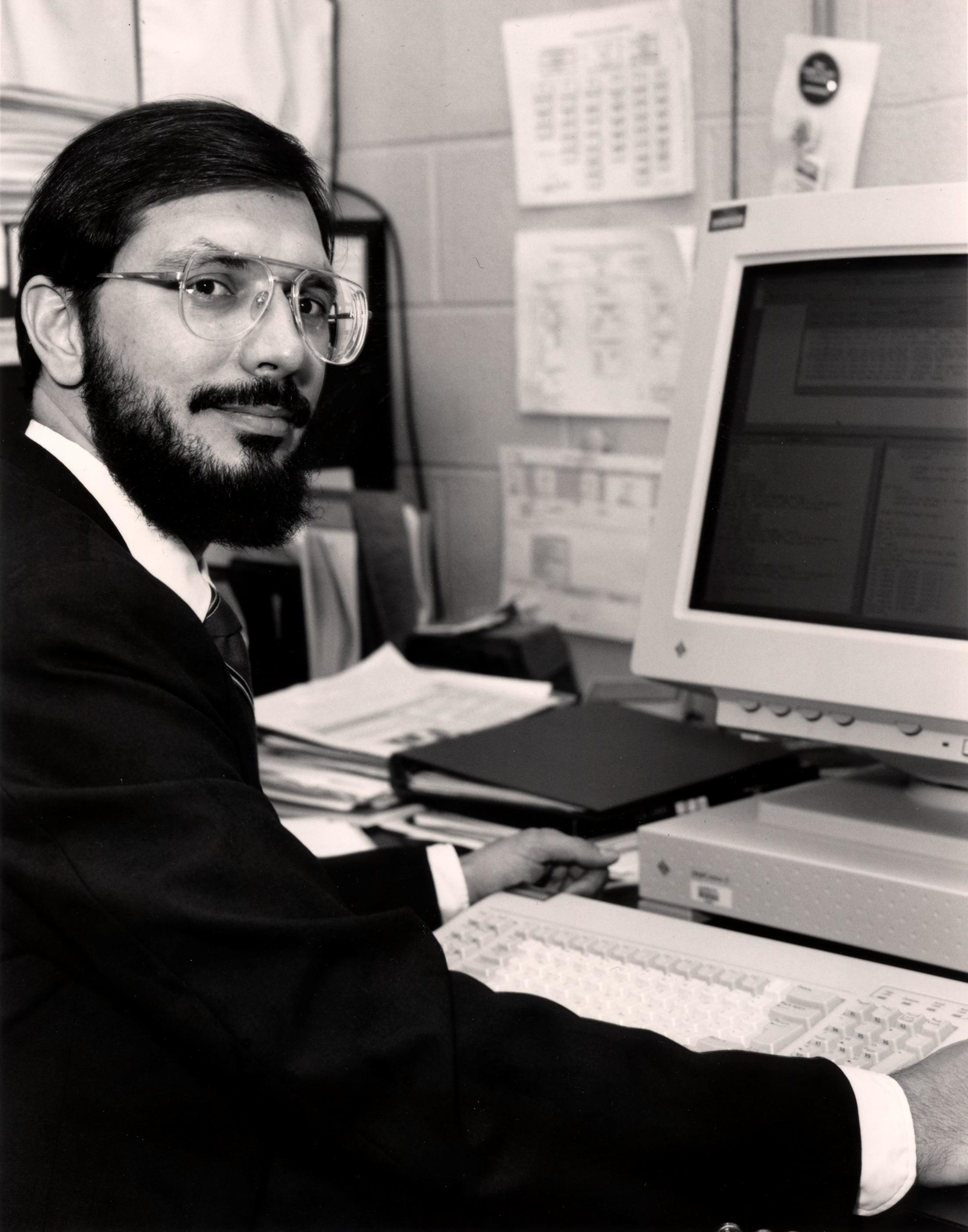
Russell Hulse

- Russell Hulse 1972G, 1975 PhD

== Pulitzer Prize winners ==
- Herbert Bix 1960, historian
- Jim Lavrakas 1974, photojournalist
- Paul Harding 1992, author and musician
- Natasha Trethewey 1995, U.S. poet laureate

== Royalty and nobility ==
- Yaduveer Wadiyar, 27th head of the Wadiyar dynasty and member of Parliament for Mysore

== Academia ==
=== Presidents ===
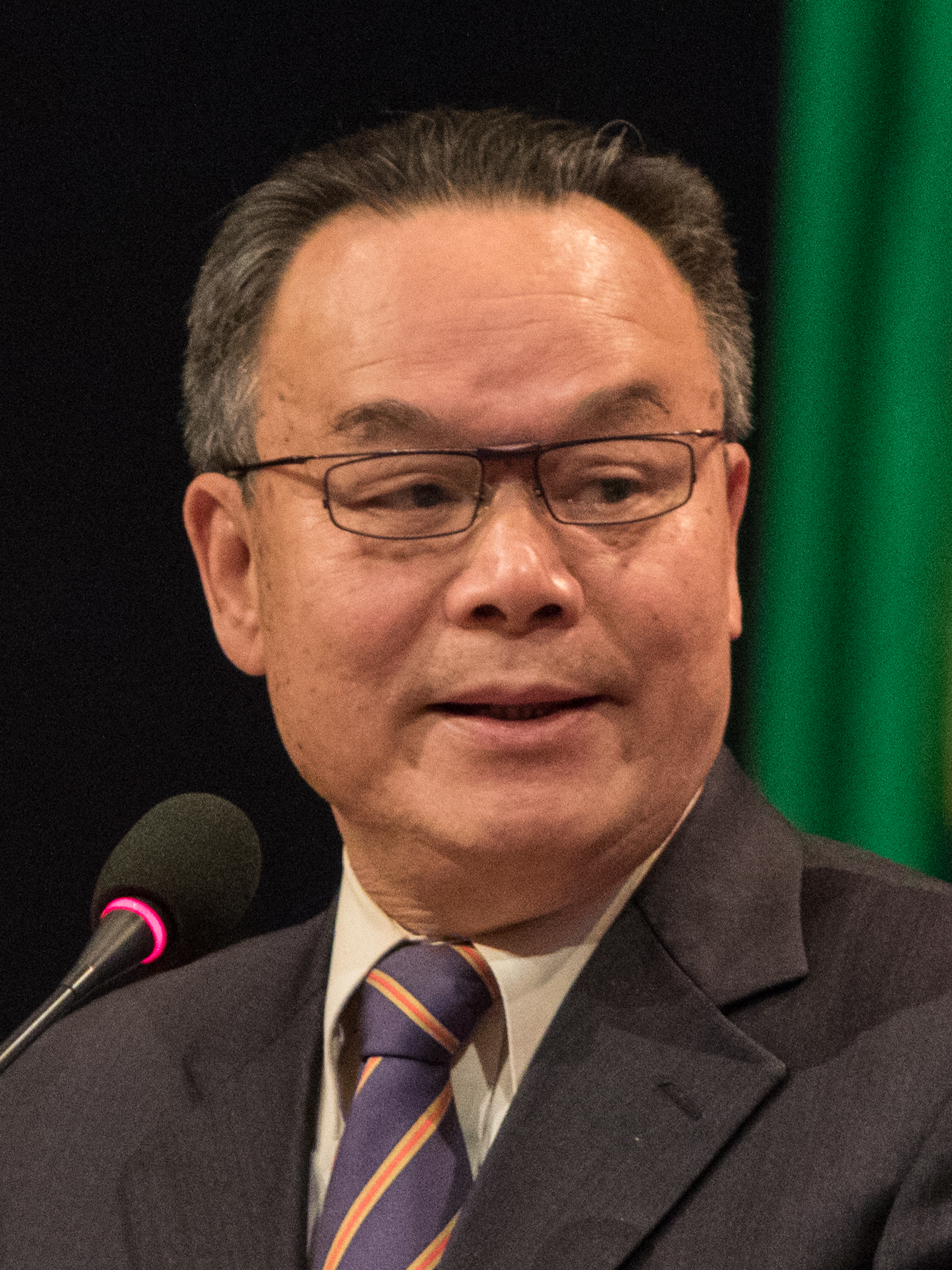
Zhou Qifeng

- Carlton Brown 1972, 1979G, president of Clark Atlanta University
- Philip R. Day G, former chancellor of City College of San Francisco and Cape Cod Community College
- Evan Dobelle 1970G, 1987 Ed.D., president of Westfield State College
- Vera King Farris G, former president of Richard Stockton College of New Jersey
- Dennis Hanno, president of Wheaton College
- Nemat Shafik, 20th president of Columbia University
- Winthrop E. Stone 1882, 5th president of Purdue University
- Zhou Qifeng 1983 PhD, 13th president of Peking University
- Donald P. Zingale 1969G, president of the State University of New York at Cobleskill

=== Faculty ===
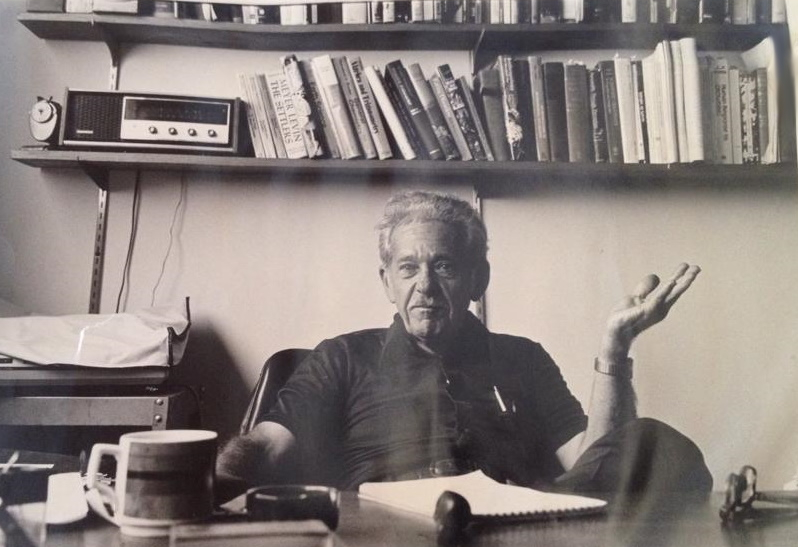
Bertram Forer

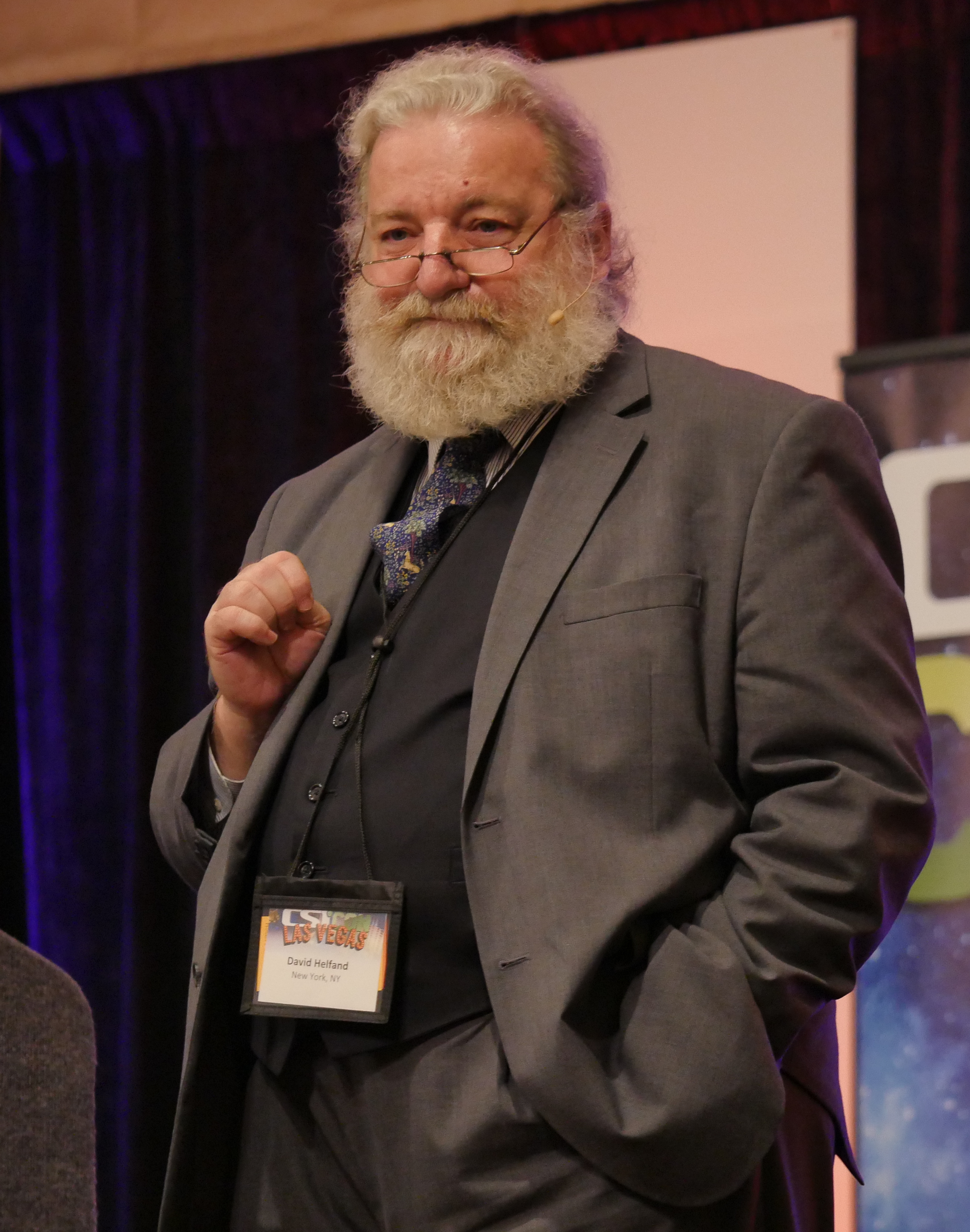
David Helfand

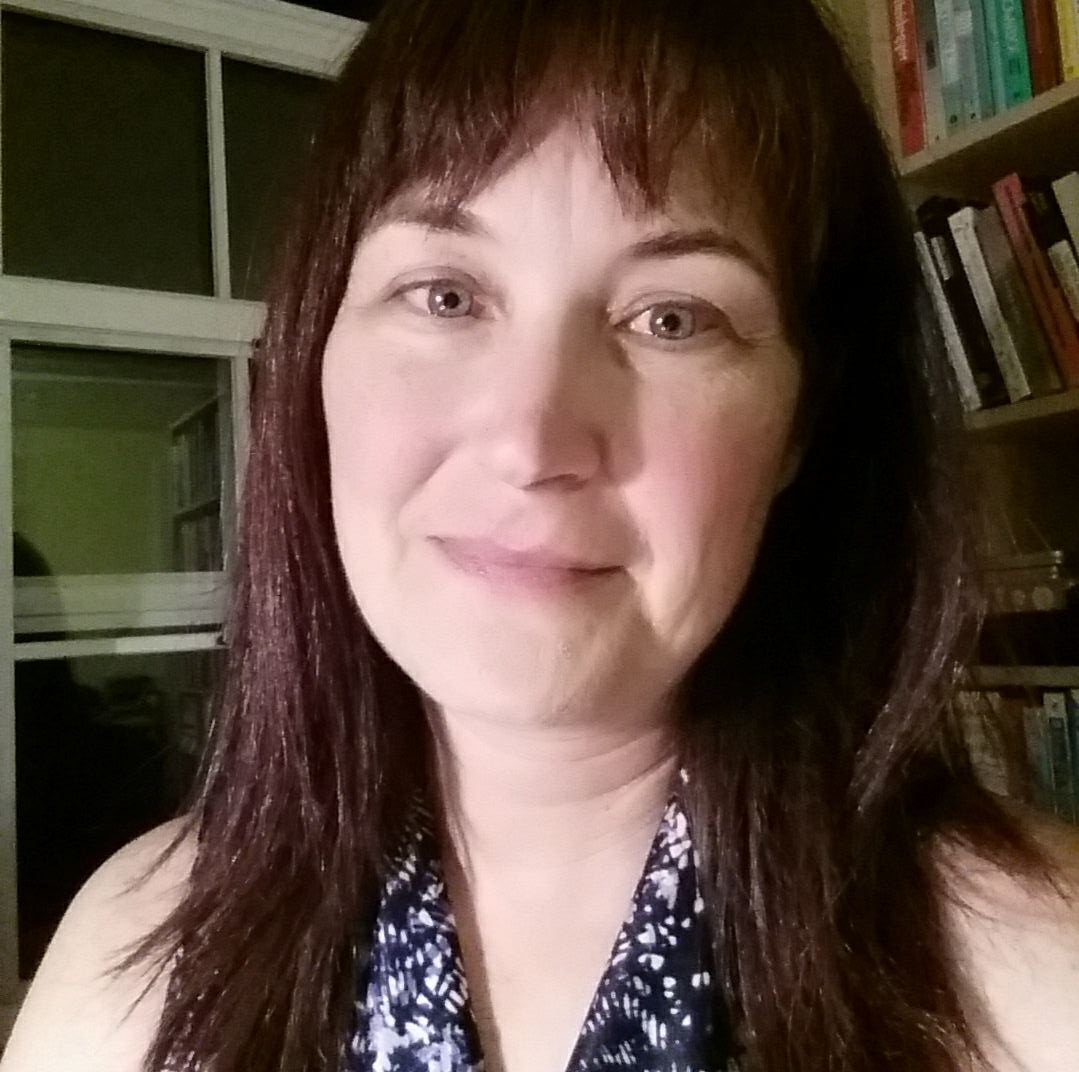
Sally Hirsh-Dickinson

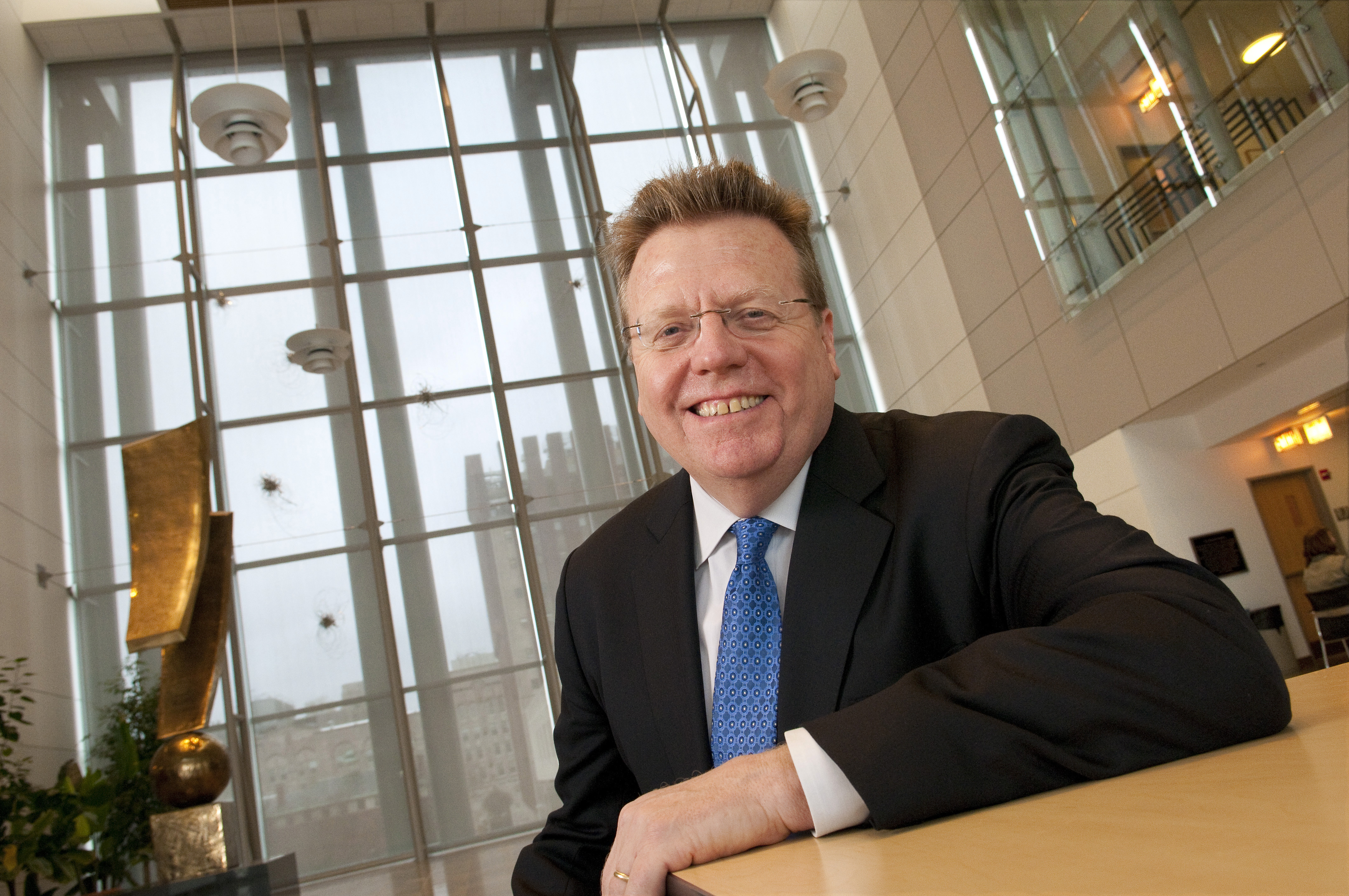
Matthew Tirrell

- Doris E. Abramson, professor and author
- Janet Abu-Lughod, sociologist, known for contributions to world-systems theory
- Amir Amini, IEEE fellow
- Christy Anderson G, professor of Art and Architecture at University of Toronto
- Maximilian Auffhammer B.S. 1996, George Pardee Jr. Professor of International Sustainable Development, University of California, Berkeley
- Dorothy Barresi, professor at California State University at Northridge
- Francis A. Bartlett 1905, dendrologist
- Edwin Bergin 1995 PhD, professor of astronomy at the University of Michigan and recipient of the Dannie Heineman Prize for Astrophysics
- Janet Catherine Berlo 1974, art historian
- Ann Bermingham, art historian
- Michael Blakey, National Endowment for the Humanities Professor at the College of William & Mary
- George Ruffin Bridgeforth, 1901, Tuskegee Institute agriculturist and first Black graduate of UMass Amherst
- Vicente Cabrera Funes, professor and writer at University of Minnesota Morris
- Lin Chao, professor at University of California, San Diego
- Gennaro Chierchia, professor and department chair of Linguistics at Harvard University
- James C. Cox, professor of economics at Georgia State University
- Michael Dirr, professor of horticulture at University of Georgia
- Larry W. Esposito 1977G, planetary astronomer, professor at the Laboratory for Atmospheric and Space Physics, University of Colorado
- Bertram Forer 1936, psychologist, namesake of the Forer effect
- Michael J. Franklin, professor and chair of Computer Science, at University of Chicago
- Mary Lou Heiss, historian and tea connoisseur
- David Helfand, 1977 PhD, professor of Astronomy at Columbia University
- Sally Hirsh-Dickinson, New Hampshire Public Radio producer and host, professor of English at Rivier University
- Andrew Hoffman, professor of Business Management and Sustainability at University of Michigan
- Donald F. Hunt, professor of Chemistry and Pathology at University of Virginia
- Leonard Katz, professor of Psychology at University of Connecticut
- Joy Ladin, professor at Yeshiva University
- Paul J. LeBlanc, president of Southern New Hampshire University; former president of Marlboro College
- Guy Livingston, food scientist and founder of Phi Tau Sigma
- Dominic W. Massaro, professor of Psychology and Computer Engineering at the UC Santa Cruz
- Dwanna L. McKay, former associate professor of Sociology at Colorado College
- Kembrew McLeod, professor of Communication Studies at University of Iowa
- Li Minqi, associate professor of Economics at University of Utah
- Dana Mohler-Faria, president of Bridgewater State College
- Joseph B. Moore, president of Lesley University
- Ann C. Noble, professor at UC Davis
- Steven Nock, Commonwealth Professor of Sociology at the University of Virginia
- William Oakland, former professor of Economics at Tulane University
- Christopher Ober, PhD 1982, Francis Norwood Bard Professor of Materials Engineering at Cornell University
- Alexey A Petrov, 1997, professor of Physics at Wayne State University, recipient of the National Science Foundation CAREER Award
- Carl Phillips, professor of English and of African and Afro-American Studies at Washington University in St. Louis
- David Rosner, professor at Columbia University
- Lawrence Solan 1978 PhD, professor of law at Brooklyn Law School
- Roger Stritmatter 2001 PhD, professor of humanities; a leading modern-day advocate of the Oxfordian theory of Shakespeare authorship
- Edwin Lorimer Thomas 1963 B.S., Ernest Dell Butcher Professor of Engineering at Rice University
- David A. Tirrell 1978 PhD, provost at California Institute of Technology
- Matthew Tirrell 1977 PhD, founding dean of Pritzker School of Molecular Engineering at the University of Chicago
- Albert E. Waugh 1924 B.S., professor of economics and provost at the University of Connecticut
- Jonathan Wilker, professor of Chemistry at Purdue University
- Laura Wright, founder of the academic field of vegan studies
- Müjde Yüksel, assistant professor at Suffolk University
- Edward N. Zalta, principal editor of the Stanford Encyclopedia of Philosophy
- Zhi-Li Zhang, professor of computer science at University of Minnesota

== Science and technology ==
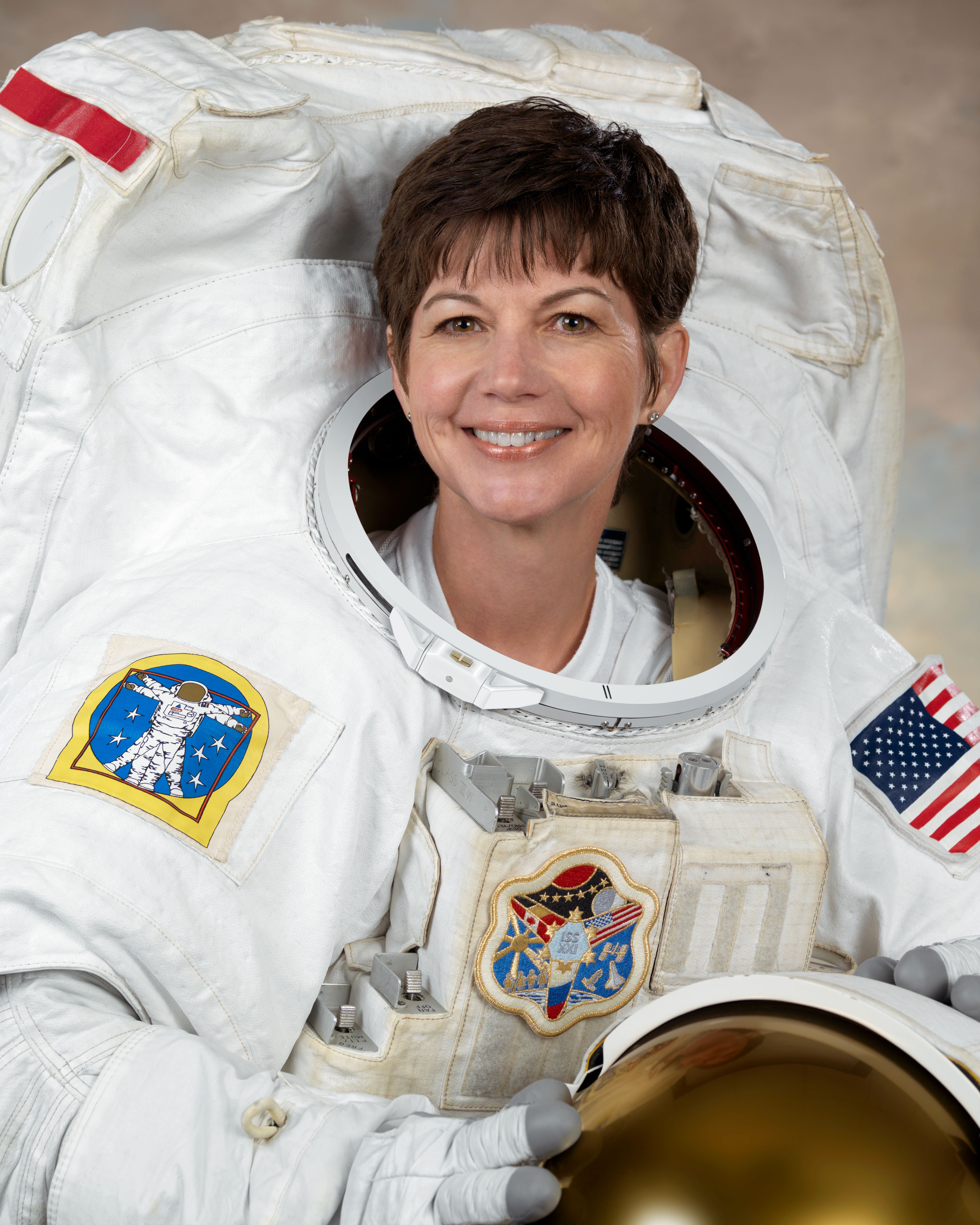
Catherine Coleman

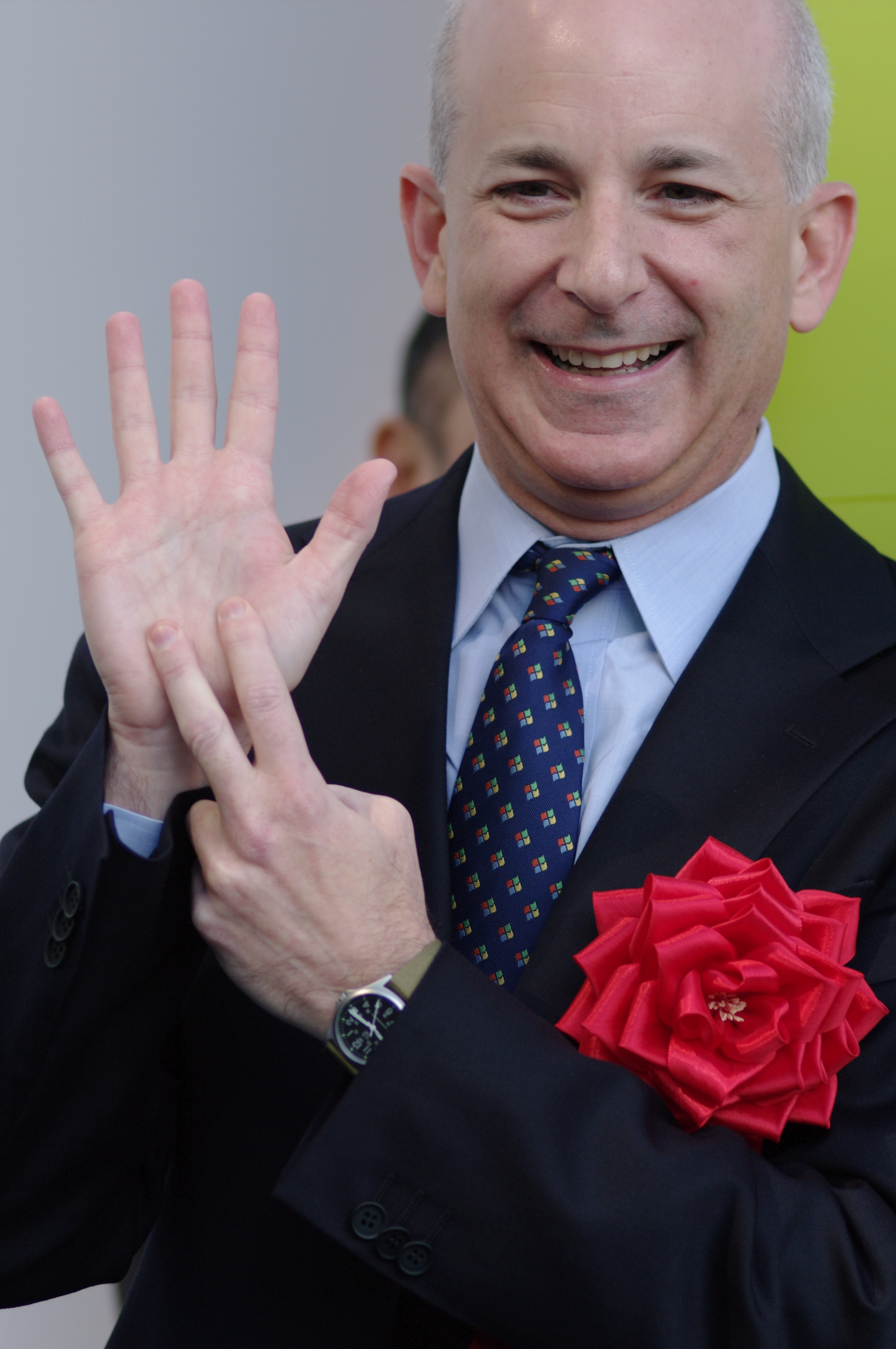
Steven Sinofsky

- William P. Brooks 1875, agronomist, foreign advisor to the Japanese government in the Meiji period, president of the Massachusetts Agricultural College
- Catherine Coleman 1991, PhD, astronaut
- Helen Cooke 1965 BS, medical researcher and academic
- Fernanda Ferreira 1985 MS Psychology; 1986, MA Linguistics; 1988 PhD Psychology, cognitive psychologist, professor at University of California, Davis
- Rebecca Hasson, associate professor at University of Michigan
- Devang Vipin Khakhar, chemical engineer, academic, Shanti Swarup Bhatnagar laureate
- Doina Precup, senior fellow at the Canadian Institute for Advanced Research
- Dan Riccio, 1986, senior vice president of Hardware Engineering at Apple
- Cynthia E. Rosenzweig, senior research scientist at NASA Goddard Institute for Space Studies
- Dorion Sagan 1981, author
- Steve Sanghi 1976 MS, president and CEO of Microchip Technology
- Steven Sinofsky 1989, president of Windows Division at Microsoft
- Sarah Stewart, first woman awarded an MD degree from Georgetown University School of Medicine
- Jim Waldo 1980, lead software architect on Jini, CTO of Harvard University
- Rachel Whitmer, 1995, epidemiologist and Alzheimer's researcher
- Sandra Leal, 2013, pharmacist and president of the American Pharmacists Association

== Business ==
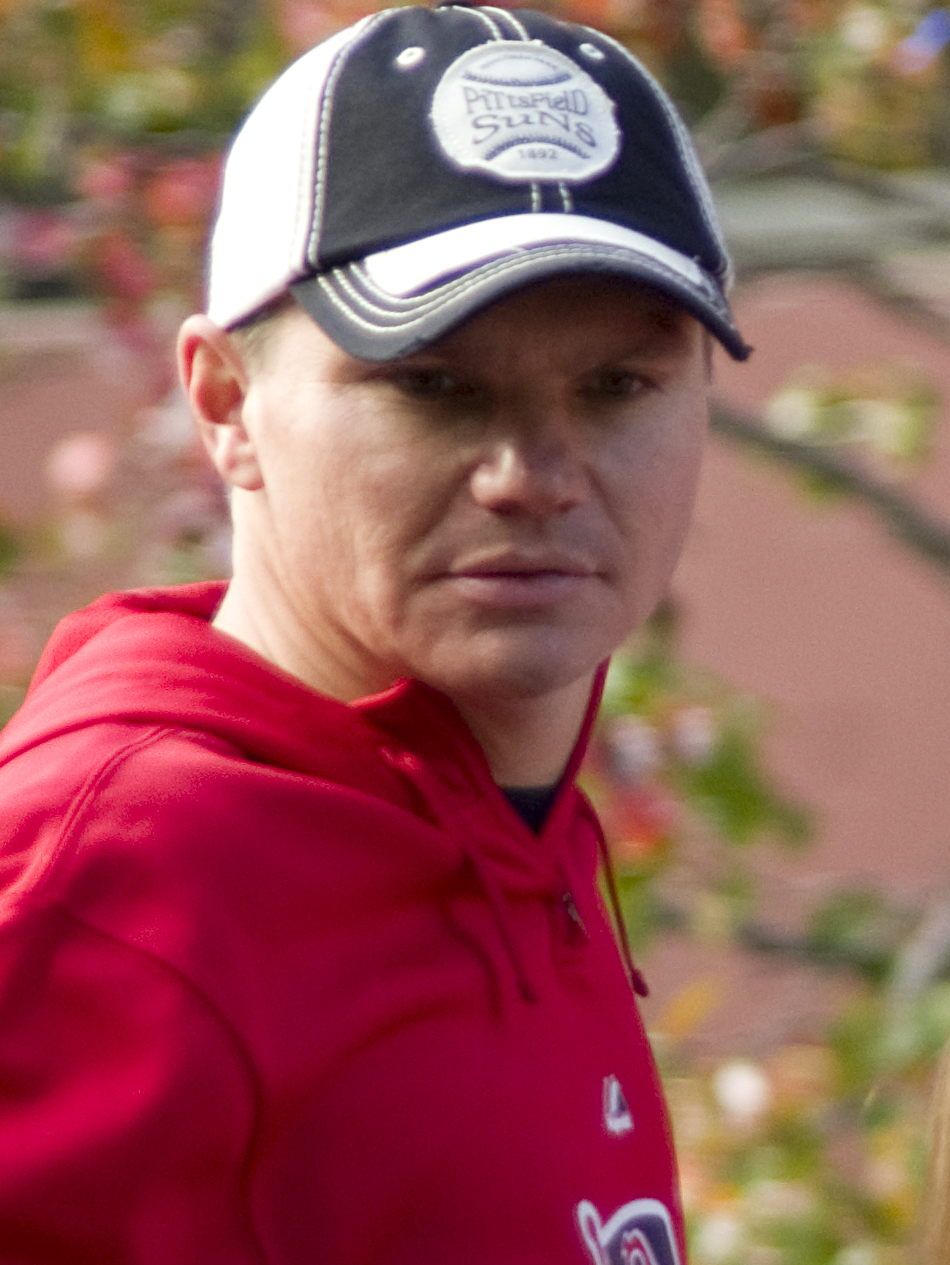
Ben Cherington

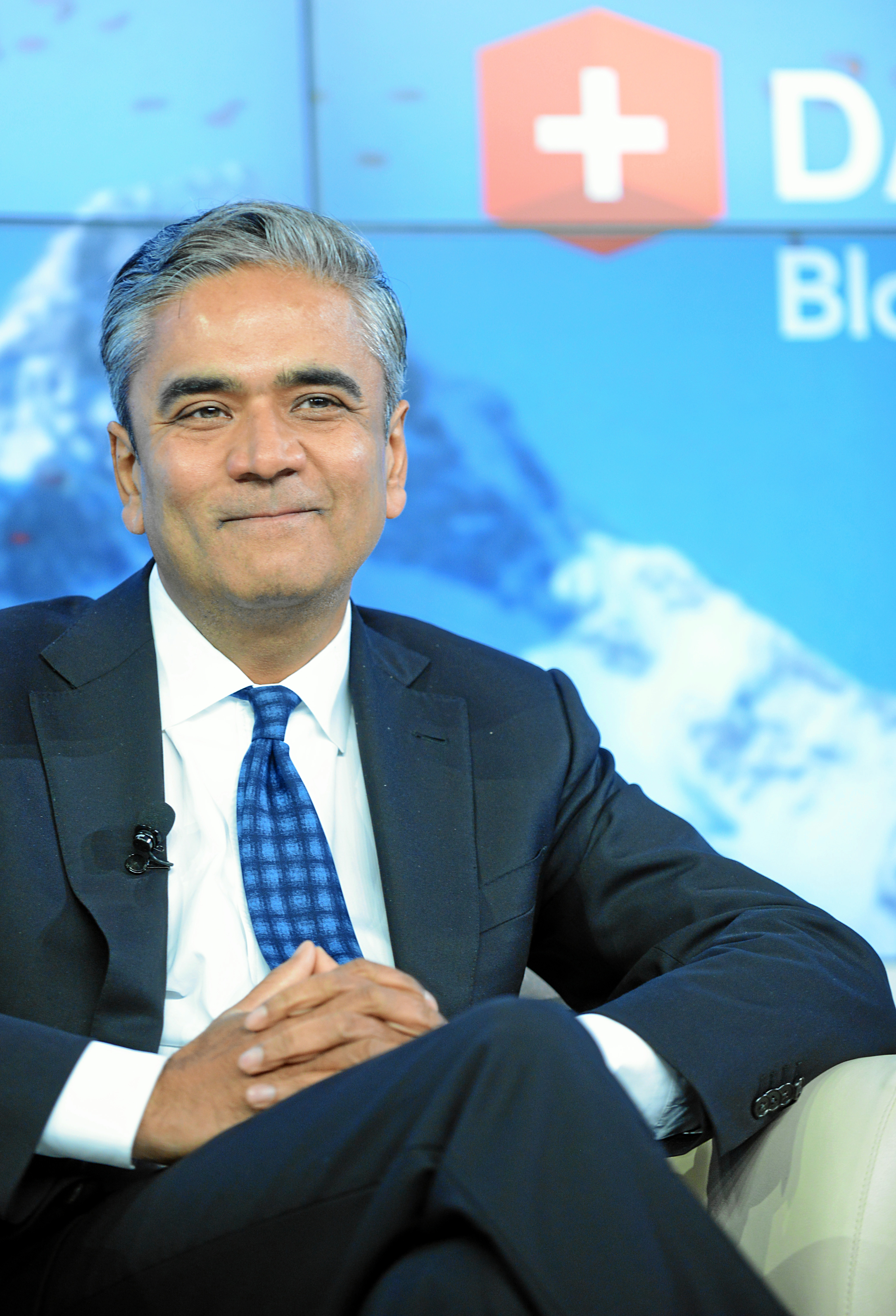
Anshu Jain

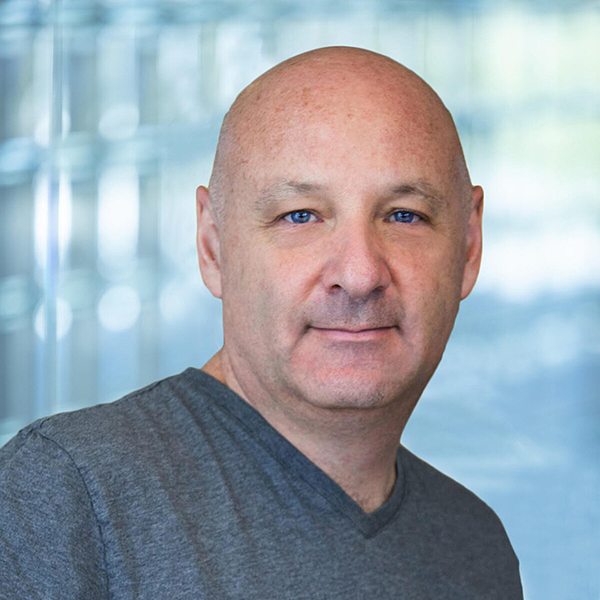
Gil Penchina

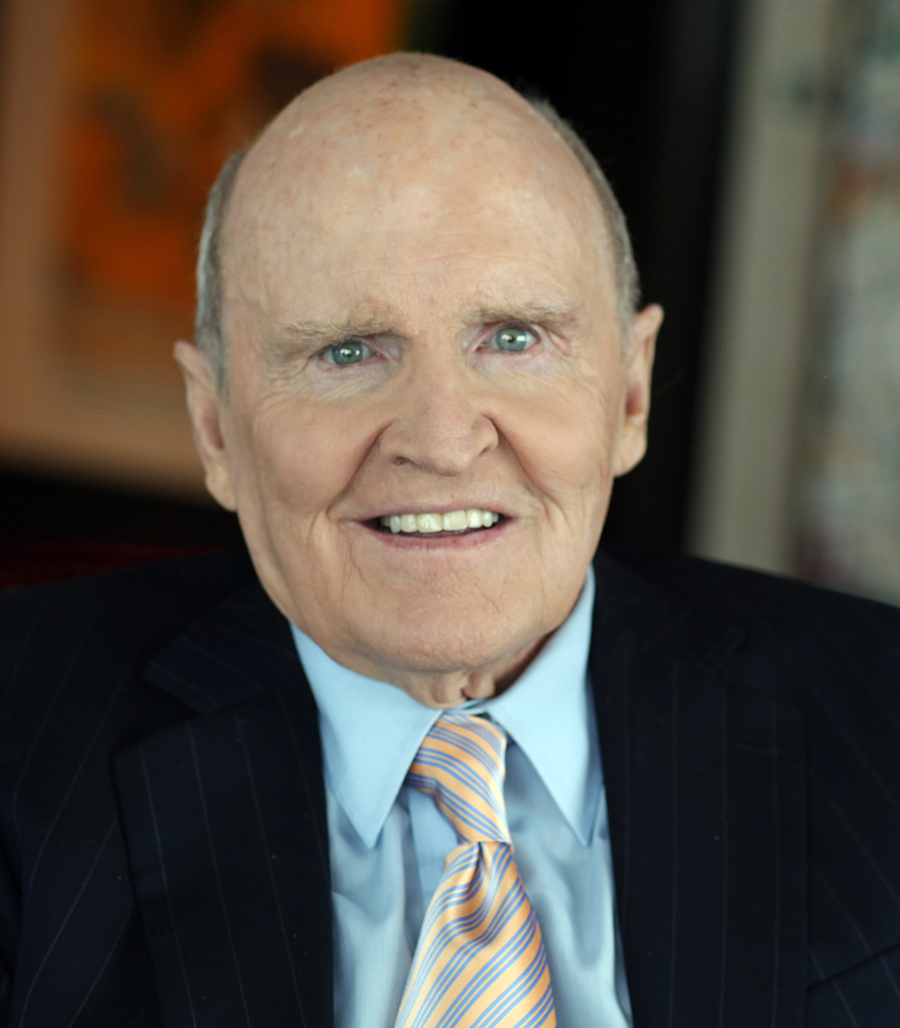
Jack Welch

- Betsy Atkins, 3-time CEO and serial entrepreneur and founder of Baja Corporation
- Tony Barbee 1993, collegiate basketball coach at Kentucky Wildcats men's basketball
- Bruce Berkowitz 1980, equity fund manager, managing director and Morningstar Domestic-Stock Fund Manager of the Decade (2010) of Fairholme Funds
- J. B. Bernstein, CEO of Access Group and chief marketing officer (CMO) of Seven Figures Management
- Wayne Chang, former director of product strategy at Twitter, creator of filesharing network i2hub and founder of AI Company Reasoner
- Ben Cherington 1997, former executive vice president and general manager of the Boston Red Sox
- Douglas Cliggott 1978, former managing director and chief investment strategist of JPMorgan Chase & Co.
- Chris Daggett, president and CEO of the Geraldine R. Dodge Foundation
- Marc Forgione, chef and owner of restaurant Marc Forgione in New York City
- Arturo Guevara, baseball writer
- Neal Huntington 1992, special assistant to the Cleveland IGuaridans, former general manager of the Pittsburgh Pirates
- Anshu Jain 1985, president of Cantor Fitzgerald and former global co-CEO of Deutsche Bank
- Dave Jauss, professional baseball coach
- John Legere, former CEO and president of T-Mobile US
- Dave Littlefield 1984, senior vice president and general manager of the Pittsburgh Pirates
- Agenor Mafra-Neto, CEO of ISCA Technologies
- Lawrence Mestel, music executive and CEO of Primary Wave
- James Pallotta 1979, president of A.S. Roma; chairman and managing director of Raptor Group
- Vivek Paul, former CEO of Wipro Technologies
- Gil Penchina, CEO of Wikia, Inc.
- Ryan Salame 2015, former CEO of FTX Digital Markets, a FTX subsidiary based in the Bahamas
- John F. Smith, Jr. 1960, former CEO and chairman of General Motors Corporation
- Earl W. Stafford, founder of the Stafford Foundation
- Mike Tannenbaum 1991, pro football analyst and former general manager of the New York Jets
- Jeff Taylor 2001, founder of Monster.com
- Pat Walsh, co-founder and chief impact officer of Classy
- Jack Welch 1957, retired CEO of General Electric
- Jill Whalen, CEO of High Rankings; co-founder of Search Engine Marketing New England
- Nick Zhang, CEO of Wuzhen Institute

== Law and politics ==
=== Governors ===
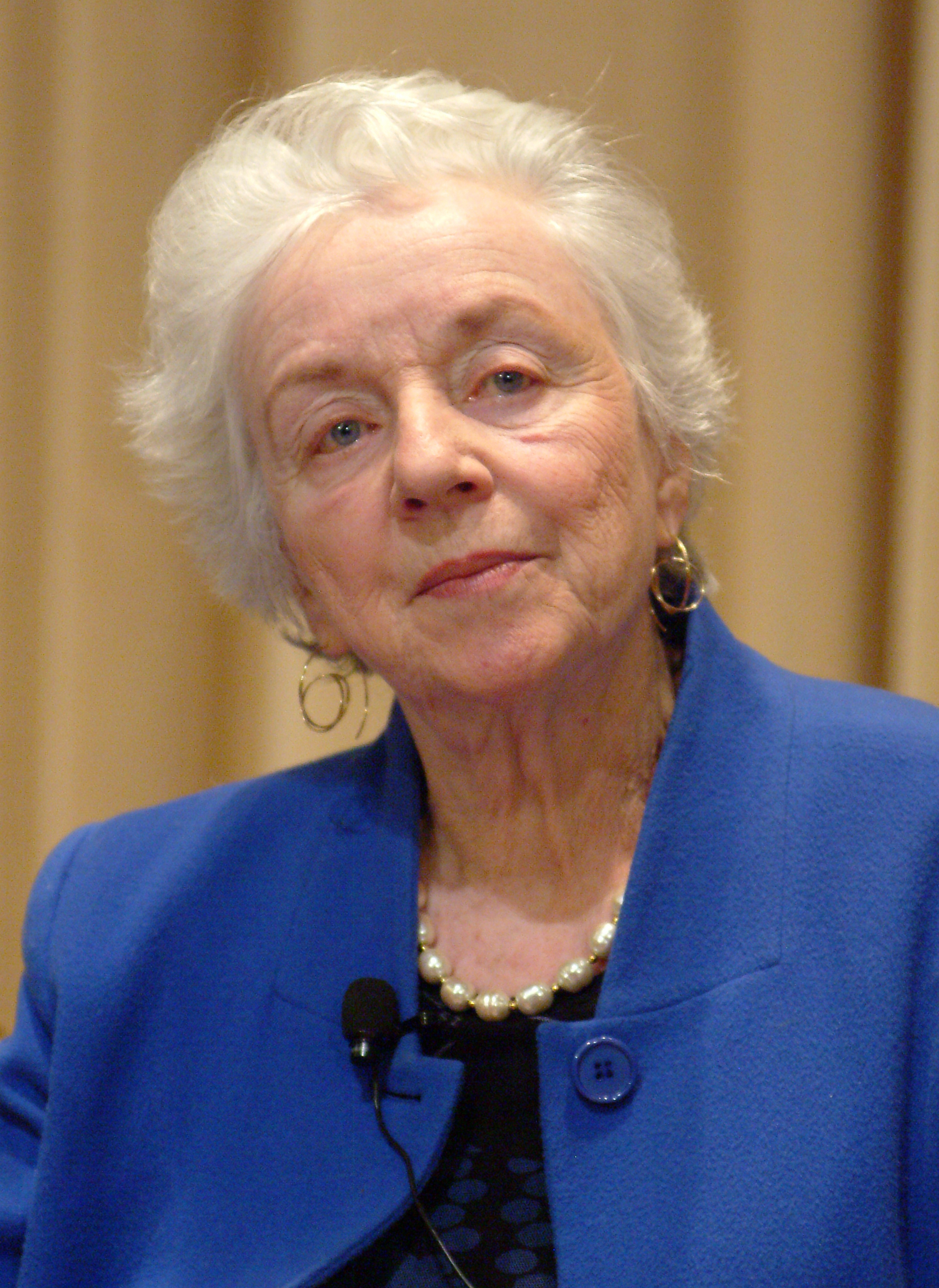
Madeleine Kunin

- Madeleine Kunin 1956, first female governor of Vermont and former U.S. ambassador to Switzerland (1985–1991)

=== Congressmen ===
- Peter G. Torkildsen 1980, former member of the United States House of Representatives from Massachusetts (1993–1997)

=== U.S. government officials ===
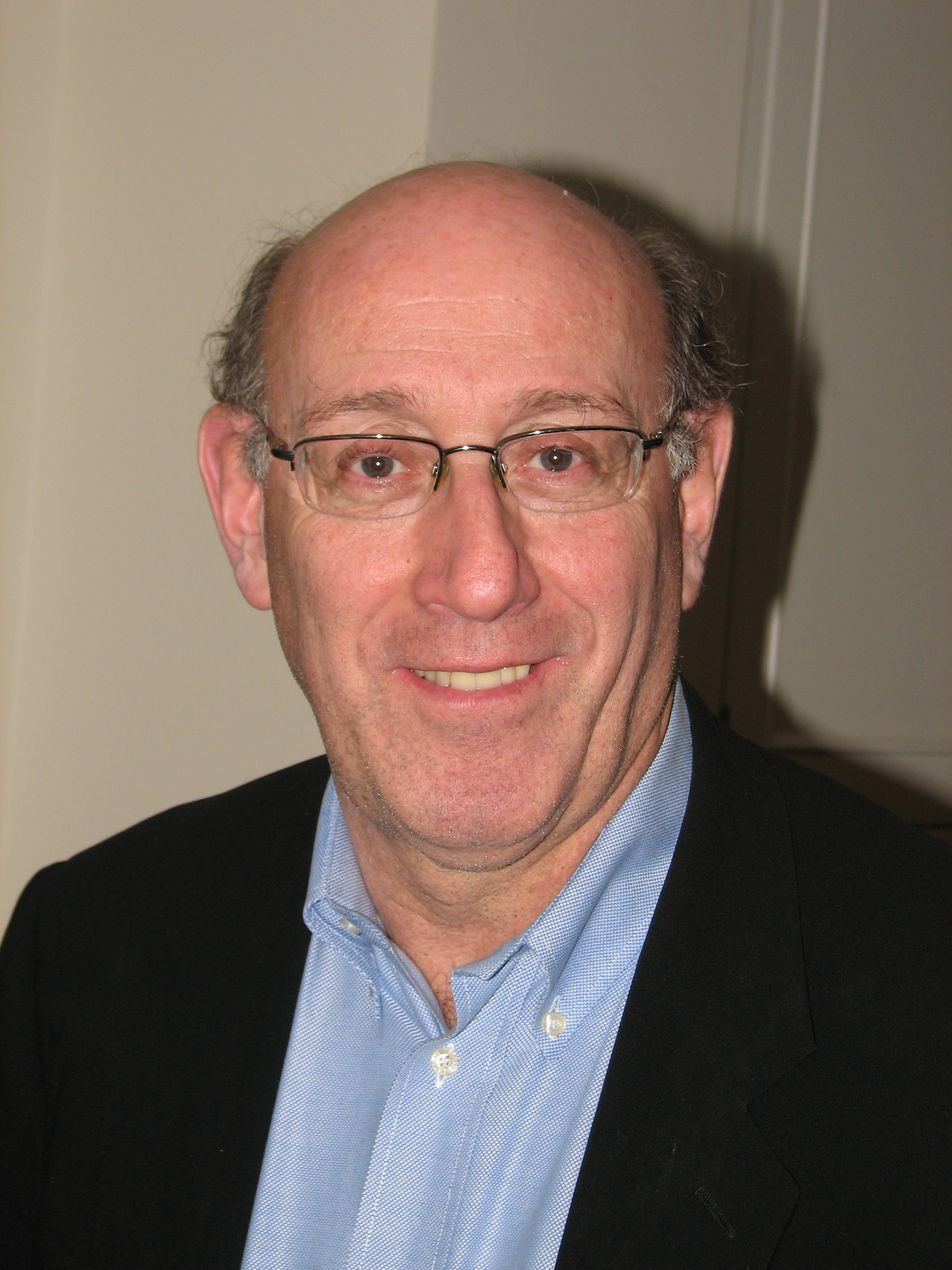
Kenneth Feinberg

- Kenneth S. Apfel 1970, former commissioner of Social Security (1997–2001)
- Richard A. Baker, historian of the United States Senate
- Charles B. Curtis 1962, former chairman of the Federal Energy Regulatory Commission (1977–1981); acting U.S. secretary of energy (1997)
- Chris Daggett 1977 Ed.D, regional United States Environmental Protection Agency administrator, 2009 New Jersey gubernatorial candidate
- Kenneth Feinberg 1967, Obama Administration "Compensation Czar" and former special master of the U.S. Government's September 11th Victim Compensation Fund
- James Kallstrom 1966, former assistant director of the FBI
- Jack Ward Thomas 1972 PhD, former chief of the United States Forest Service (1993–1996)

=== Diplomats ===
- Jeffrey Davidow 1965, former U.S. ambassador to Zambia, Venezuela, and Mexico; named a career ambassador in 2002
- Thomas C. Krajeski, former U.S. ambassador to Yemen
- Madeleine Kunin 1956, former U.S. ambassador to Switzerland and first female governor of Vermont
- Stephen A. Seche, U.S. ambassador to Yemen since 2007

=== Jurists ===
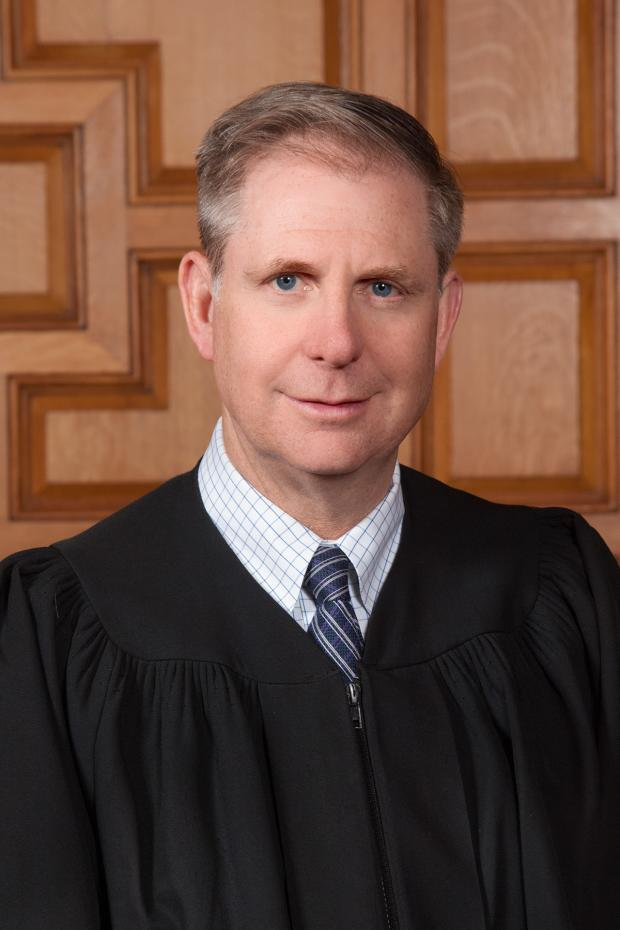
David A. Lowy

- Marsha Kazarosian, 1978, attorney who handled high-profile cases
- Erik P. Kimball 1987 BA, federal judge on the United States Bankruptcy Court of the Southern District of Florida
- David A. Lowy, judge of the Massachusetts Supreme Judicial Court
- Fred I. Parker 1962, served as a federal judge on the United States Court of Appeals for the Second Circuit
- Eduardo C. Robreno 1967 MA, federal judge on the United States District Court for the Eastern District of Pennsylvania

=== State legislators and executives ===
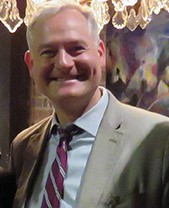
Reuven Carlyle

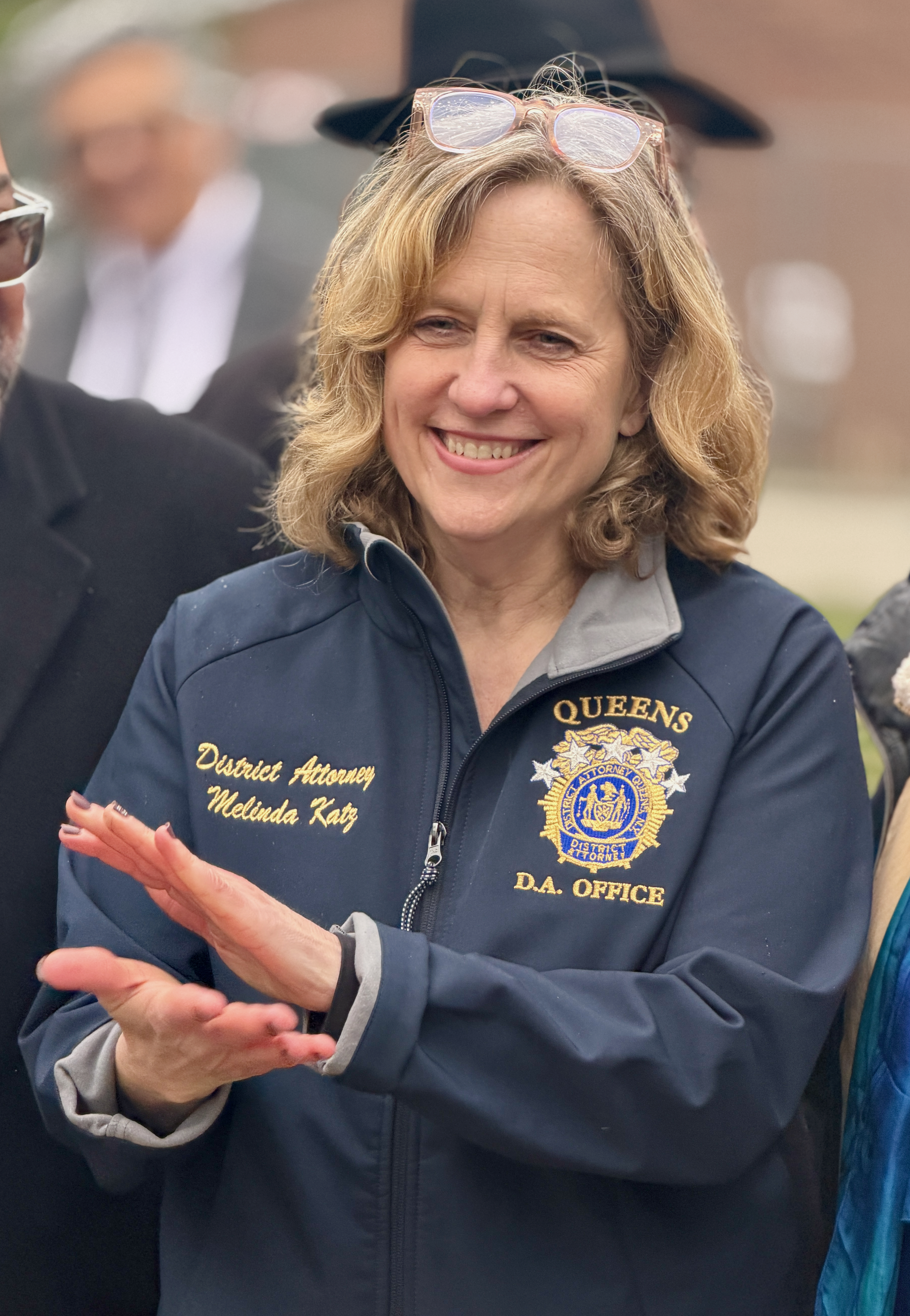
Melinda Katz

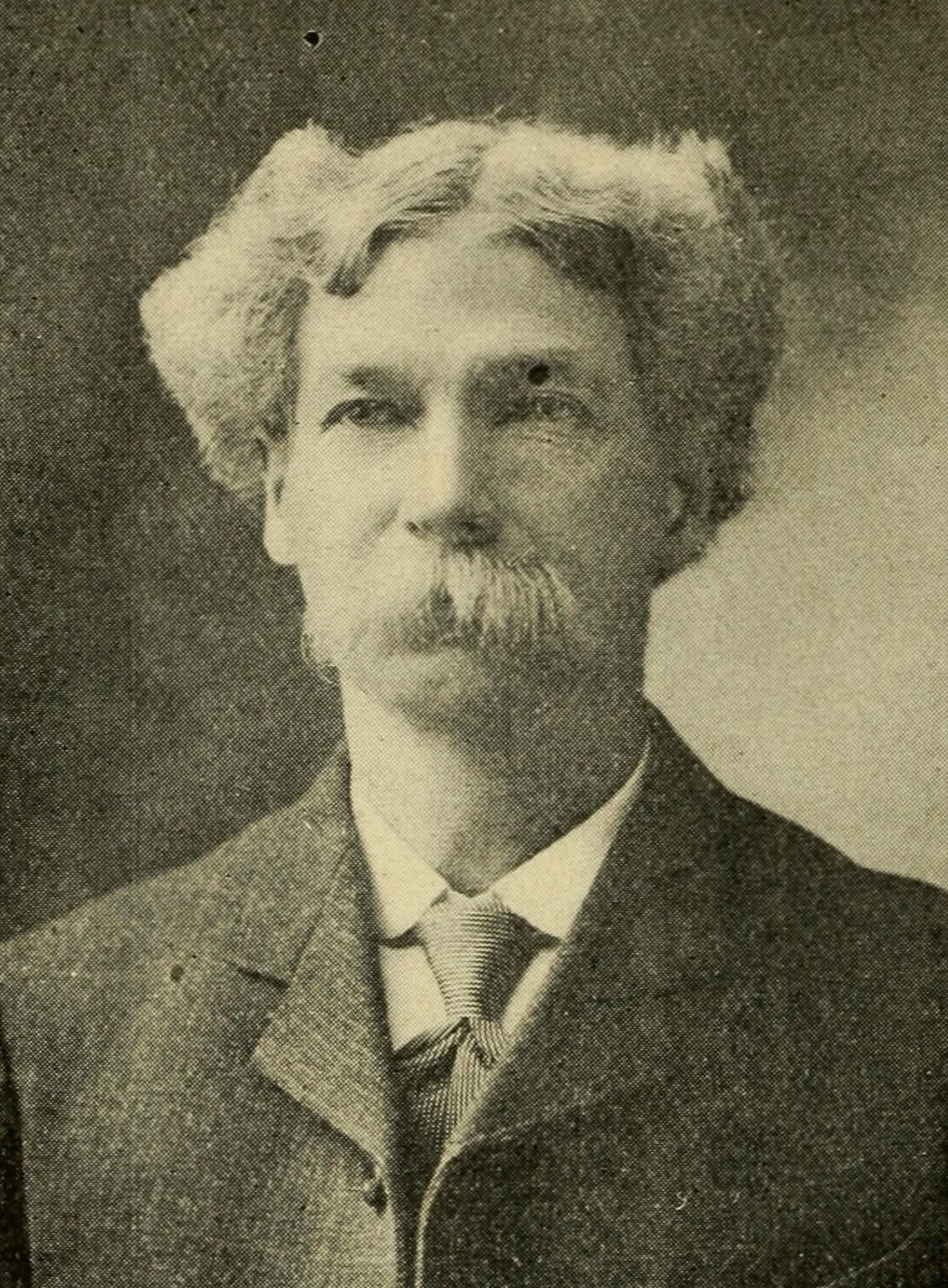
Arthur D. Norcross

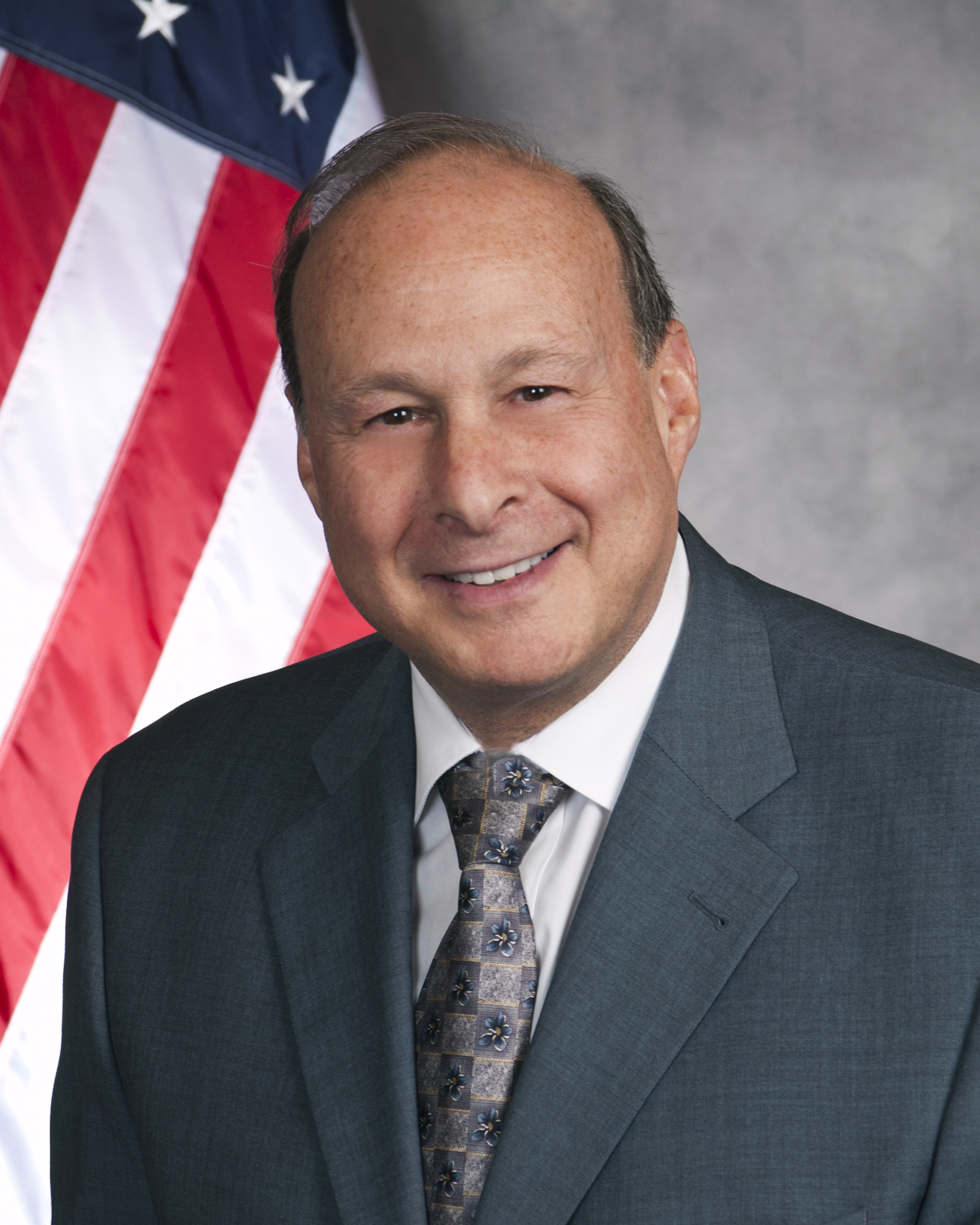
Stanley C. Rosenberg

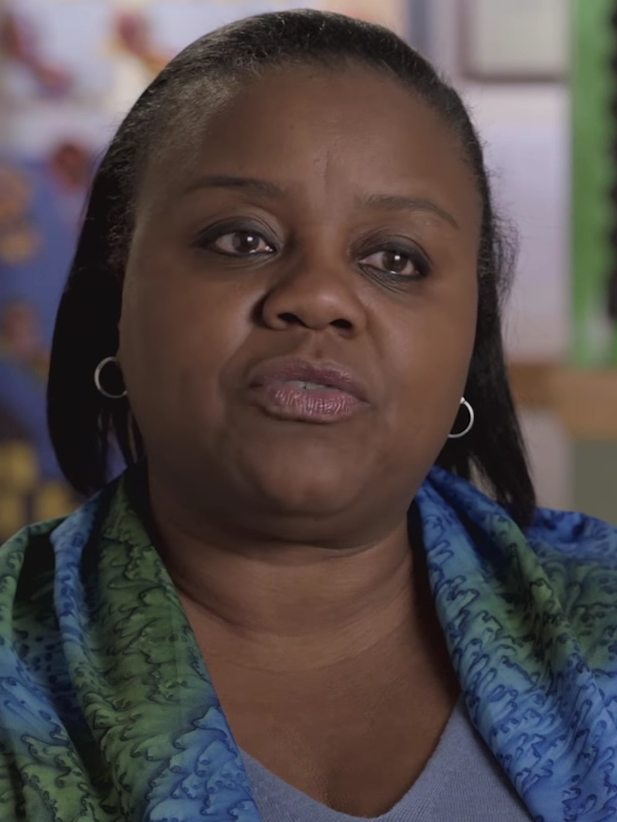
Marie St. Fleur

- Denise Andrews, member of the Massachusetts House of Representatives (2011–present)
- David M. Bartley 1956, former speaker of the Massachusetts House of Representatives (1969–1973) and 1984 candidate for the United States Senate
- Joan Bray, former member of Missouri State Senate (2003–2010) and Missouri House of Representatives (1993–2002)
- Stephen Brewer 1971, member of the Massachusetts State Senate (1995–present)
- Linda Dean Campbell, member of the Massachusetts House of Representatives (2007–present)
- Reuven Carlyle 1987, member of the Washington House of Representatives (2009–present)
- Steven D'Amico, former member of the Massachusetts House of Representatives (2007–2011)
- Eileen Donoghue 1976, member of the Massachusetts State Senate (2011–present)
- Lewis G. Evangelidis 1984, member of the[Massachusetts House of Representatives (2003–present)
- Christopher M. Fierro 2002, 2004 MS, former member of the Rhode Island House of Representatives (2009–2011)
- John J. Finnegan, former Massachusetts state auditor (1981–1987)
- Nancy Flavin 1986, former member of the Massachusetts House of Representatives (1993–2003)
- Paul K. Frost 1993, member of the Massachusetts House of Representatives (1997–present), assistant House minority whip
- Thomas N. George, former member of the Massachusetts House of Representatives (1997–2005)
- Guy Glodis, former member of the Massachusetts State Senate (1999–2005) and Massachusetts House of Representatives (1997–1999)
- Frederick D. Griggs 1913, former member of the Massachusetts House of Representatives (1925–1928)
- Christopher Hodgkins, former member of the Massachusetts House of Representatives (1983–2003)
- Kate Hogan, member of the Massachusetts House of Representatives (2009–present)
- Philip W. Johnston, former Massachusetts secretary of Human Services
- Melinda Katz (born 1965), Queens County District Attorney, 19th Borough President of Queens, Member of the New York City Council, and Member of the New York State Assembly
- Sally Kerans 1982, former member of the Massachusetts House of Representatives (1991–1997)
- Stephen Kulik, member of the Massachusetts House of Representatives (1993–present)
- Patrick Landers, former member of the Massachusetts House of Representatives (1987–1999)
- Gary LeBeau, member of the Connecticut State Senate (1997–present)
- Paul Mark, member of the Massachusetts House of Representatives (2011–present)
- Michael W. Morrissey, district attorney of Norfolk County, Massachusetts (2011–present)
- Betty Jo Nelsen, former member of the Wisconsin State Assembly (1979–1990)
- Arthur D. Norcross 1871, former member of the Massachusetts State Senate (1908–1909) and Massachusetts House of Representatives (1904–1906)
- Andrea F. Nuciforo, Jr. 1986, former member of the Massachusetts State Senate (1997–2007)
- Carmen Hooker Odom, former secretary of the North Carolina Department of Health and Human Services
- David Poisson, former member of the Virginia House of Delegates (2006–2010)
- Ruth Provost, former member of the Massachusetts House of Representatives (1997–2003)
- Stanley C. Rosenberg 1977, openly gay member of the Massachusetts State Senate (1986–present)
- Marie St. Fleur, former member of the Massachusetts House of Representatives (1999–2011)
- Barry Trahan, former member of the Massachusetts House of Representatives (1987–1989)
- Joseph Wagner, former member of the Massachusetts House of Representatives (1991–present)
- Rachel Weston 2003, member of the Vermont House of Representatives (2007–present)

=== International figures ===
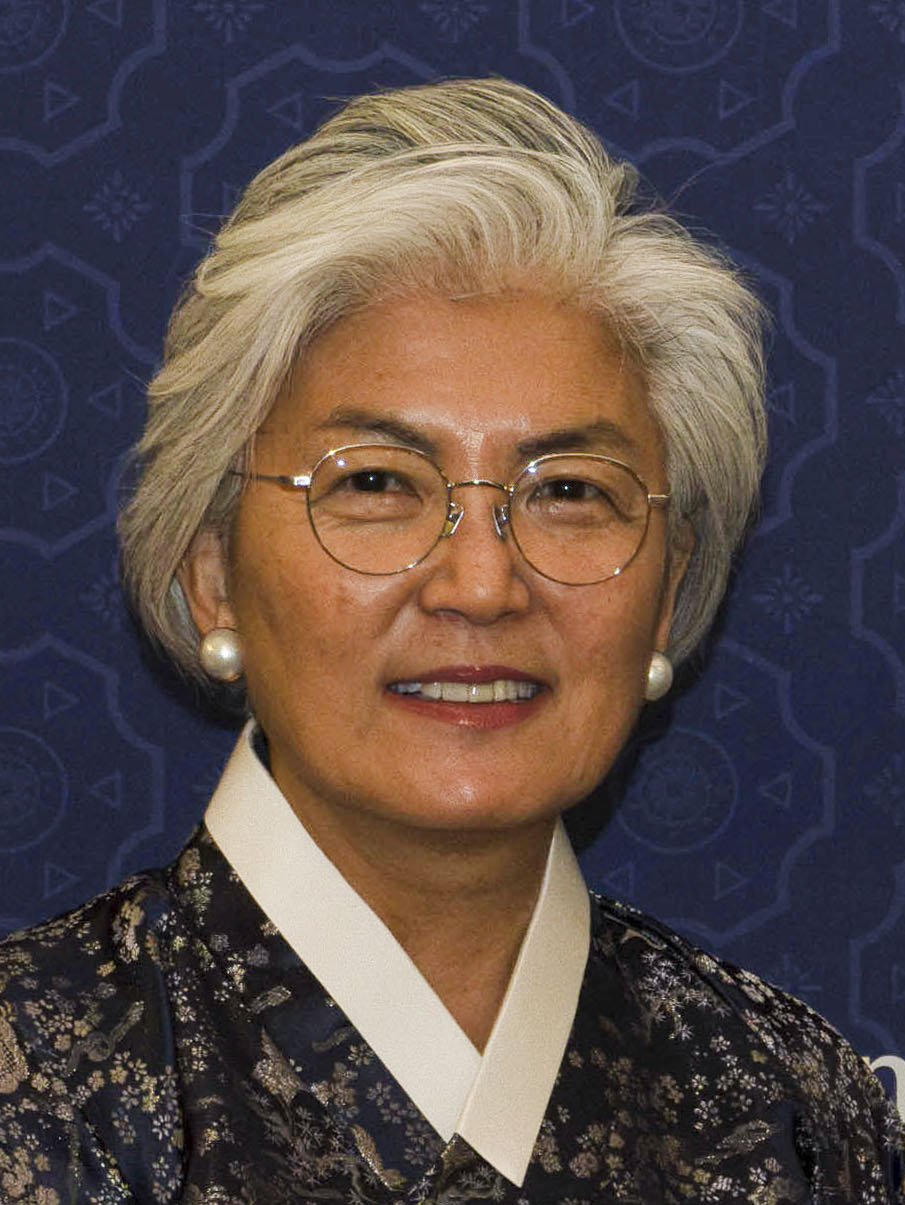
Kang Kyung-wha

- Hau Lung-pin, 1982 PhD, mayor of Taipei, Republic of China (Taiwan)
- Rudolf Hommes Rodríguez, former minister of Finance and Public Credit of Colombia
- Kang Kyung-wha MA, PhD, foreign minister of South Korea, former United Nations deputy high commissioner for Human Rights
- Hina Rabbani Khar 2001, Pakistani minister of Foreign Affairs (2011–2013), the first woman to hold this post
- Makaziwe Mandela, daughter of Nelson Mandela
- Uttama Savanayana (อุตตม สาวนายน), 1990 PhD, minister of Finance, Thailand
- Srettha Thavisin, prime minister of Thailand
- Mose Tjitendero 1977 Ed.D., former speaker of the National Assembly of Namibia

=== County and municipal officials ===
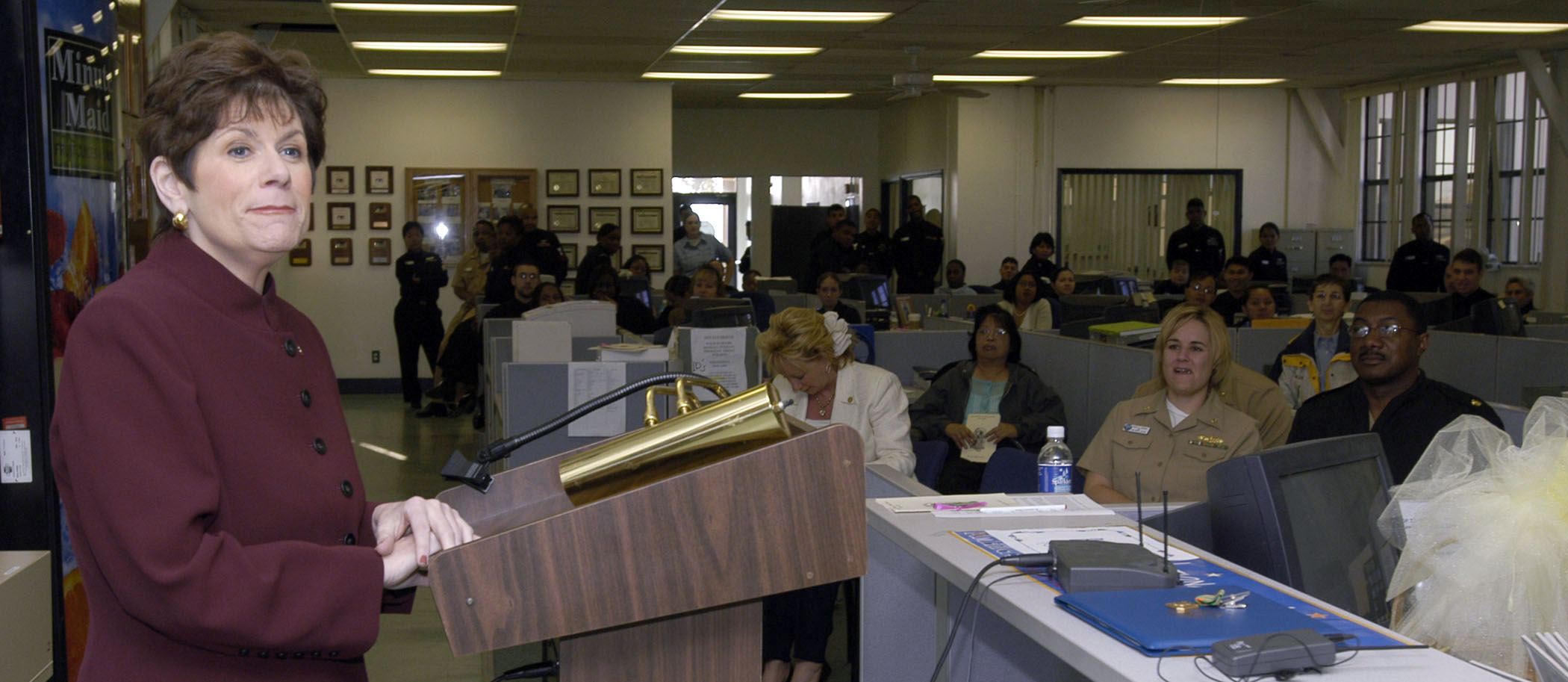
Bonnie Dumanis

- Bonnie Dumanis (attended), district attorney of San Diego County (2003–present)
- Maura Hennigan 1972, former Boston city councilor and first female clerk-magistrate of Suffolk County
- Billy Kenoi 1993, mayor of Hawaii County
- Salvatore LaMattina 1981, District 1 Boston city councilor
- Joseph Sullivan, mayor of Braintree, Massachusetts

=== Activists ===
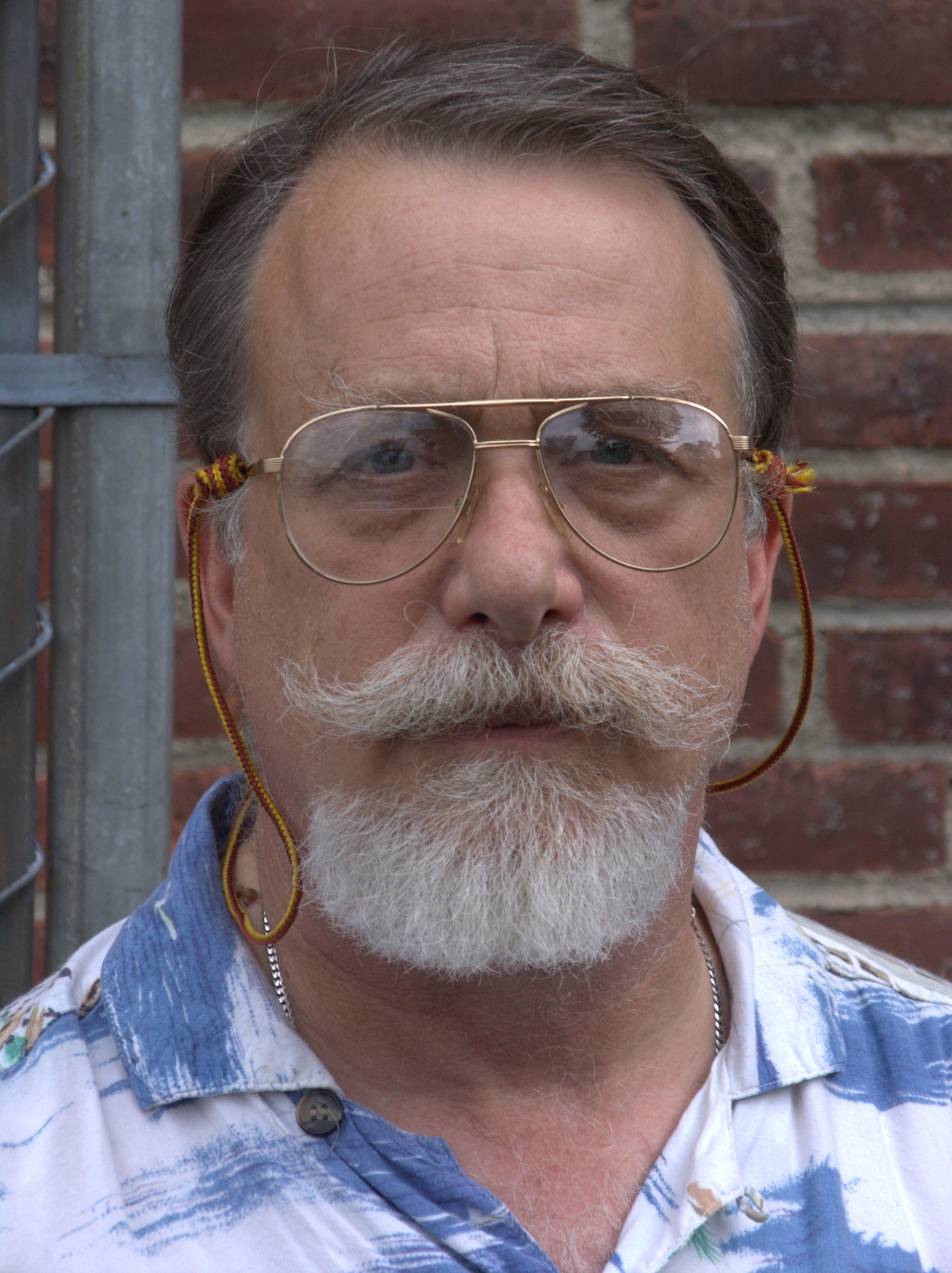
Hugh Loebner

- Brian Darling 1987, conservative activist and senior fellow at The Heritage Foundation
- Jackson Katz, social activist
- Hugh Loebner, social activist for the decriminalization of prostitution
- Ray Rogers, labor rights activist and labor union strategist
- Tony Rudy, lobbyist and associate of Jack Abramoff
- Allen St. Pierre 1989, executive director of NORML
- Betty Shabazz 1975 PhD, widow of Malcolm X
- Sue Thrasher 1996 Ed.D, civil rights activist

== Military ==
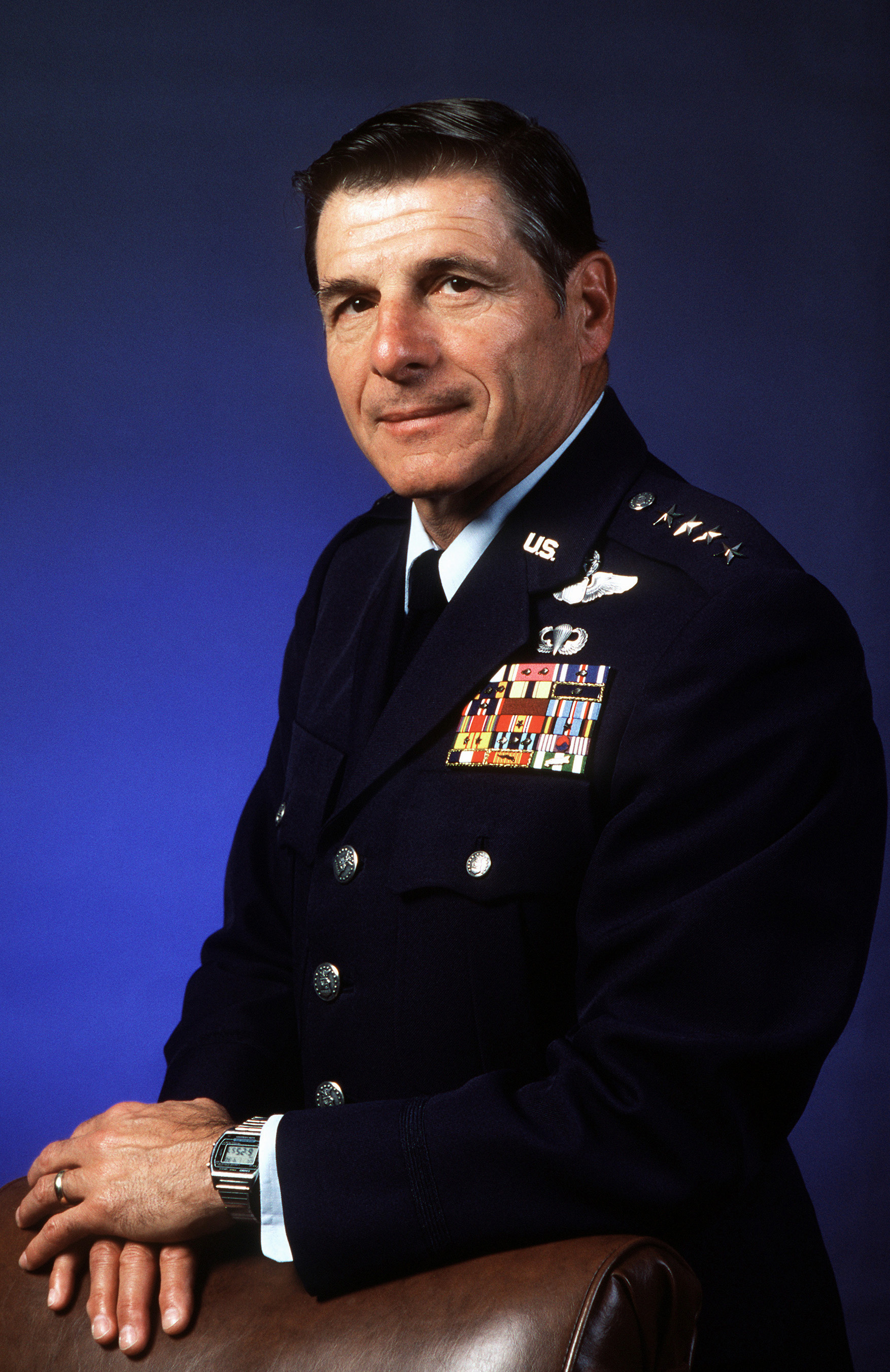
Andrew P. Iosue

- Brian Beaudreault, commander of II Marine Expeditionary Force
- Jody Daniels, 34th chief of Army Reserve
- Franklin M. Davis Jr., major general in the United States Army
- Thomas F. Healy, U.S. Army general and former commandant of the Army War College
- Frederick Heyliger 1950, officer with Easy Company, 2nd Battalion, 506th Parachute Infantry Regiment, in the 101st Airborne Division of the United States Army during World War II; featured in the HBO miniseries Band of Brothers
- Andrew P. Iosue 1951, general (R) of the United States Air Force; commander of Air Training Command (COMATC), 1983–1986
- Michael S. Martin, major general in the United States Marine Corps
- Robert Miller, 24th surgeon general of the United States Air Force and the United States Space Force
- Lee E. Payne, major general in the United States Air Force
- L. Fletcher Prouty, chief of Special Operations for the Joint Chiefs of Staff
- William N. Sullivan

== Film ==
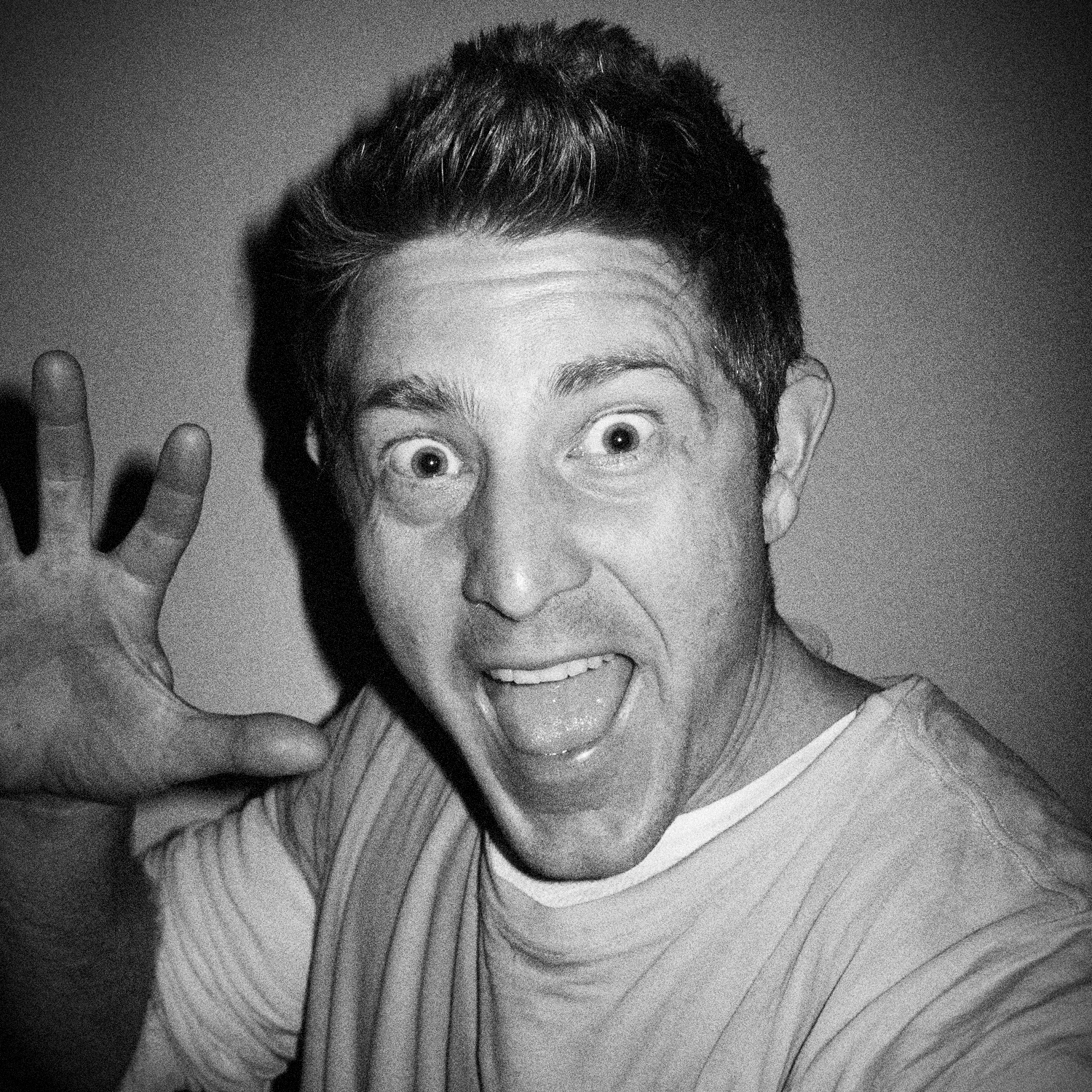
Jason Nash

- Jere Burns, 1980, actor
- Rob Corddry, actor
- Jeffrey Donovan, actor
- Richard Gere, 1971, actor (did not graduate)
- Jonathan Hensleigh, 1981, screenwriter and film director
- Fardeen Khan, Bollywood actor (did not graduate)
- William Monahan, screenwriter, The Departed
- Bridget Moynahan, actress (did not graduate)
- Jason Nash, 1995, actor, director, screenwriter, comedian, YouTube personality
- Bill Pullman, 1980 MFA, actor

== Television ==
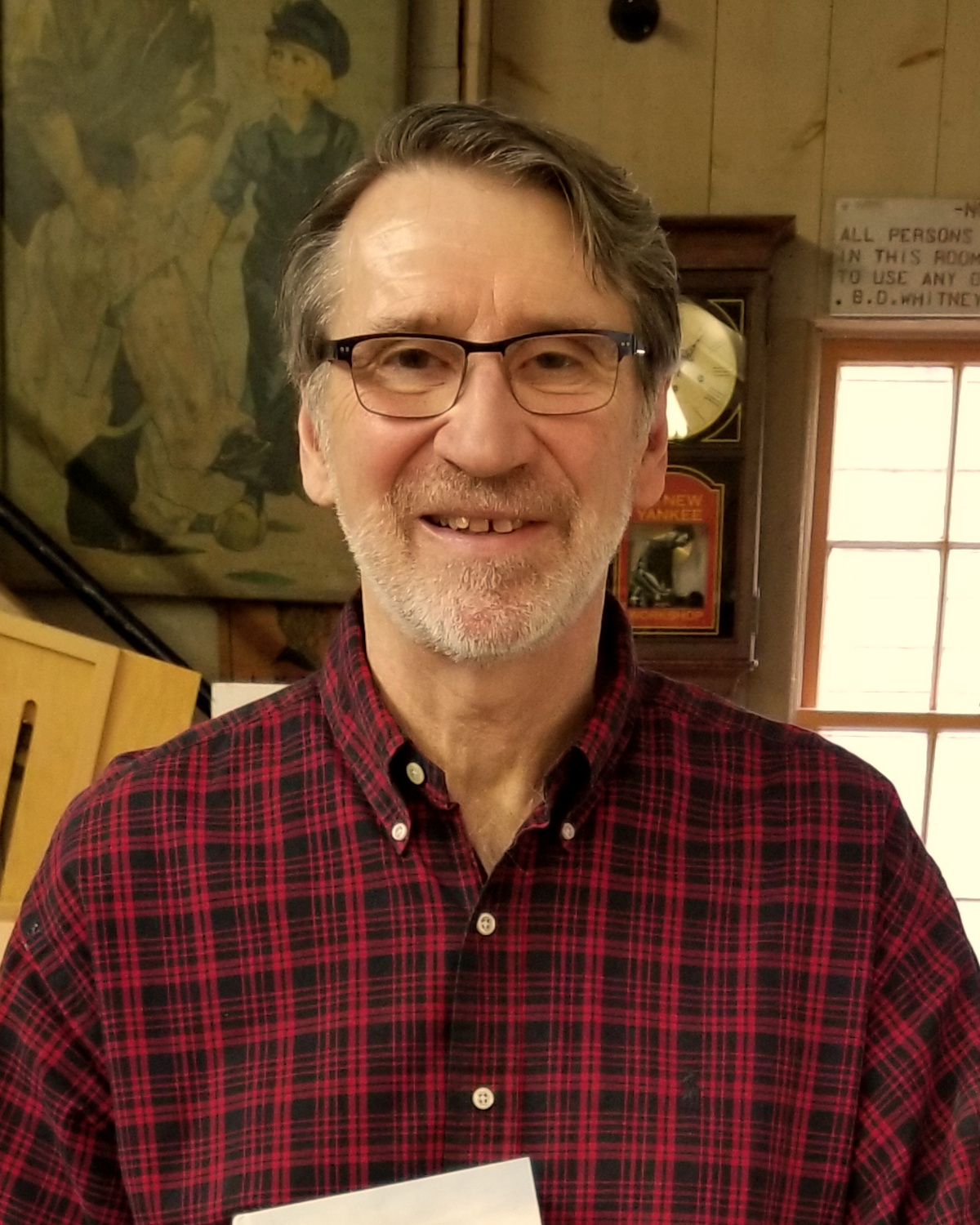
Norm Abram

- Norm Abram 1972, "America's most famous carpenter"
- Rob Corddry 1993, former writer and correspondent for The Daily Show, actor on television series The Winner
- Jeff Corwin 2002, Animal Planet's The Jeff Corwin Experience
- Bill Cosby 1972G, 1976 Ed.D., actor, comedian, writer, star of The Cosby Show
- Jeffrey Donovan 1991, star of USA original series Burn Notice
- Marc Forgione 2010, competitor on Food Network's Iron Chef America; won season three of The Next Iron Chef in 2010; owner of restaurant Marc Forgione in New York City
- Lauren Koslow, actress on Days of Our Lives
- Phil Laak, professional poker player nicknamed "The Unabomber"
- Loretta Long 1973 PhD, long-time Sesame Street actress
- Ken Ober 1980, game show host, comedian, and actor
- Nancy Oliver, writer for the series Six Feet Under
- Mark Preston 1994, CNN senior political analyst and executive editor, CNN Politics
- Peter Tolan, television producer, director, and screenwriter
- Mark Wilding 1979, lead writer and executive producer of Grey's Anatomy
- Jean Worthley 1948, naturalist; former host of Hodgepodge Lodge; co-host of On Nature's Trail

== Journalism ==
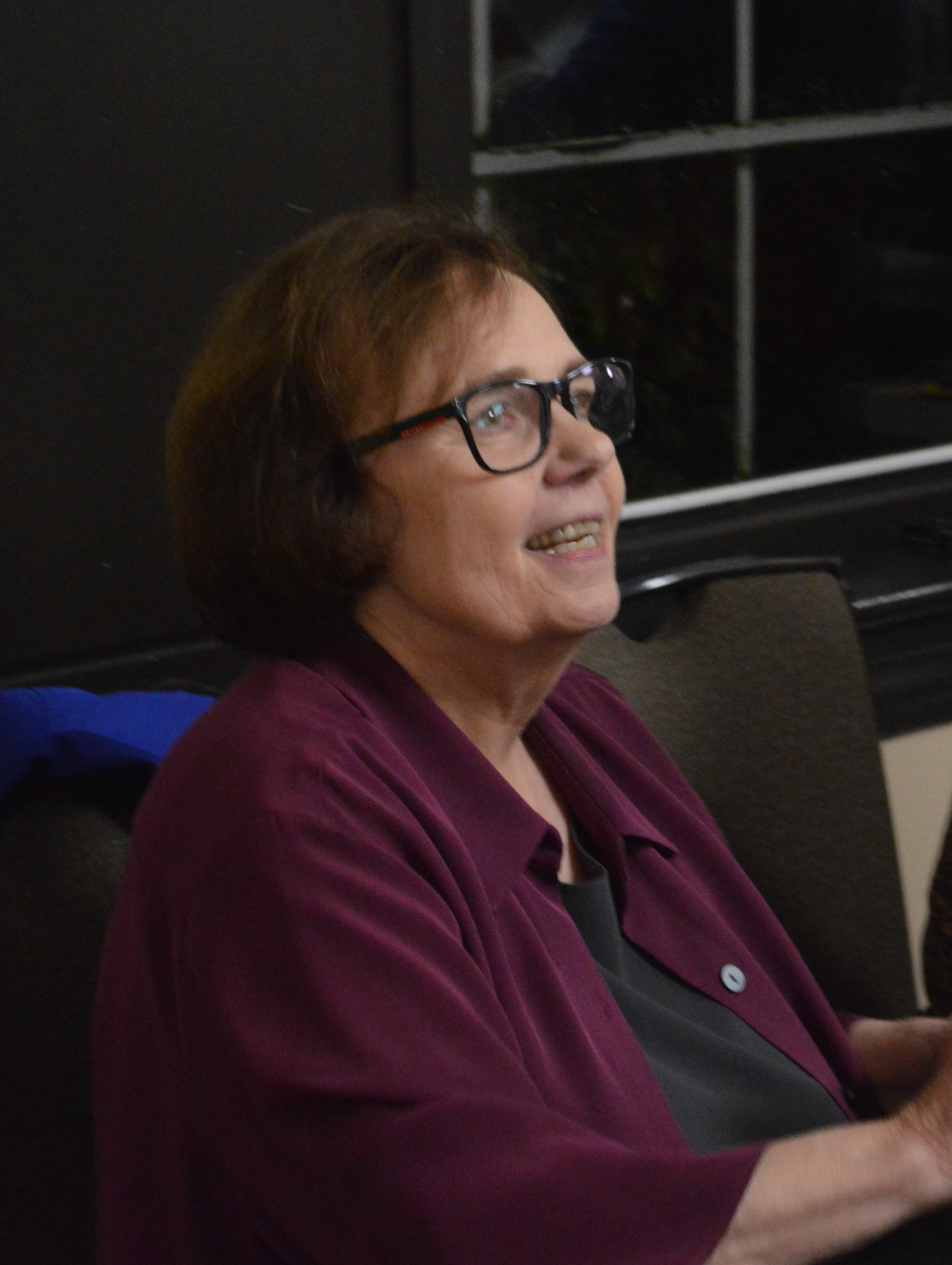
Gail Collins

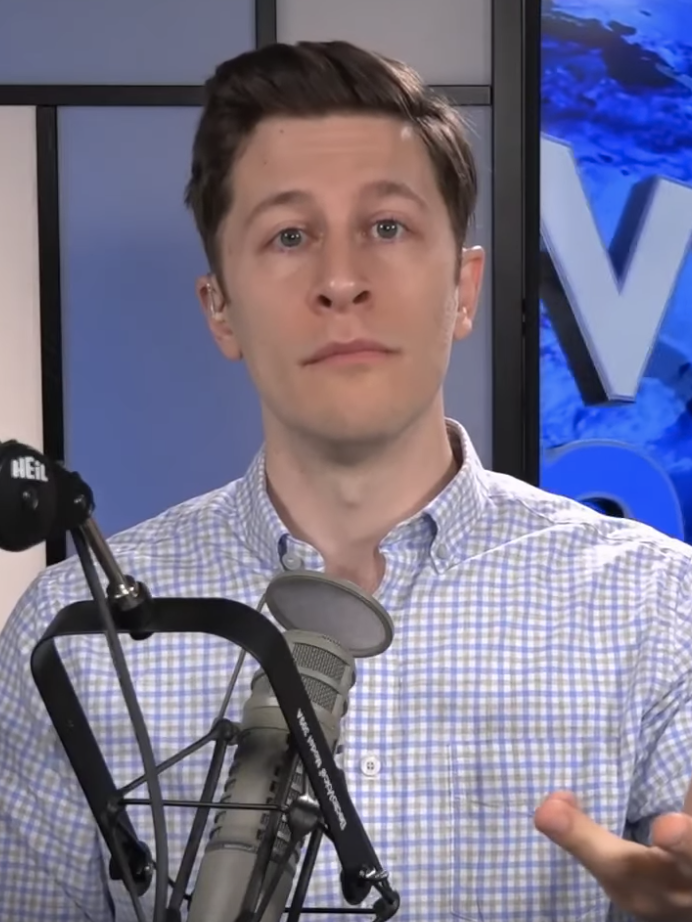
David Pakman

- Deepak Ananthapadmanabha 1998, web-based technology journalist
- Steve Buckley 1978, sportswriter
- Gerry Callahan, sports writer for the Boston Herald and radio talk show personality for WEEI
- Jill Carroll 1999, journalist for Christian Science Monitor, kidnapped in Iraq on assignment in January 2006
- George Chidi, 2000, journalist for The Guardian, witness in the Georgia election racketeering prosecution of Donald Trump
- Gail Collins 1970 MA, New York Times columnist and former editorial page editor
- Audie Cornish 2001, National Public Radio host of All Things Considered, former host of Weekend Edition Sunday
- Jenny Dell 2008, reporter for CBS Sports
- James Foley 2003, freelance journalist and photojournalist of the Syrian Civil War
- Matt Malone, 1994, Jesuit and journalist; editor in chief of America magazine
- Michael C. Moynihan, senior editor of the libertarian magazine Reason
- Wendi Nix, reporter for ESPN
- David Pakman, host of the internationally syndicated television and radio program The David Pakman Show
- Mark Preston, executive editor, CNN Politics and CNN Senior Political Analyst
- Carol Rosenberg, senior journalist with the McClatchy News Service known for her coverage of the operation of the Guantanamo Bay detention camps in Cuba
- Dan Wetzel, national columnist, Yahoo! Sports; Netflix executive producer, New York Times best-selling author

== History, literature, art, and music ==
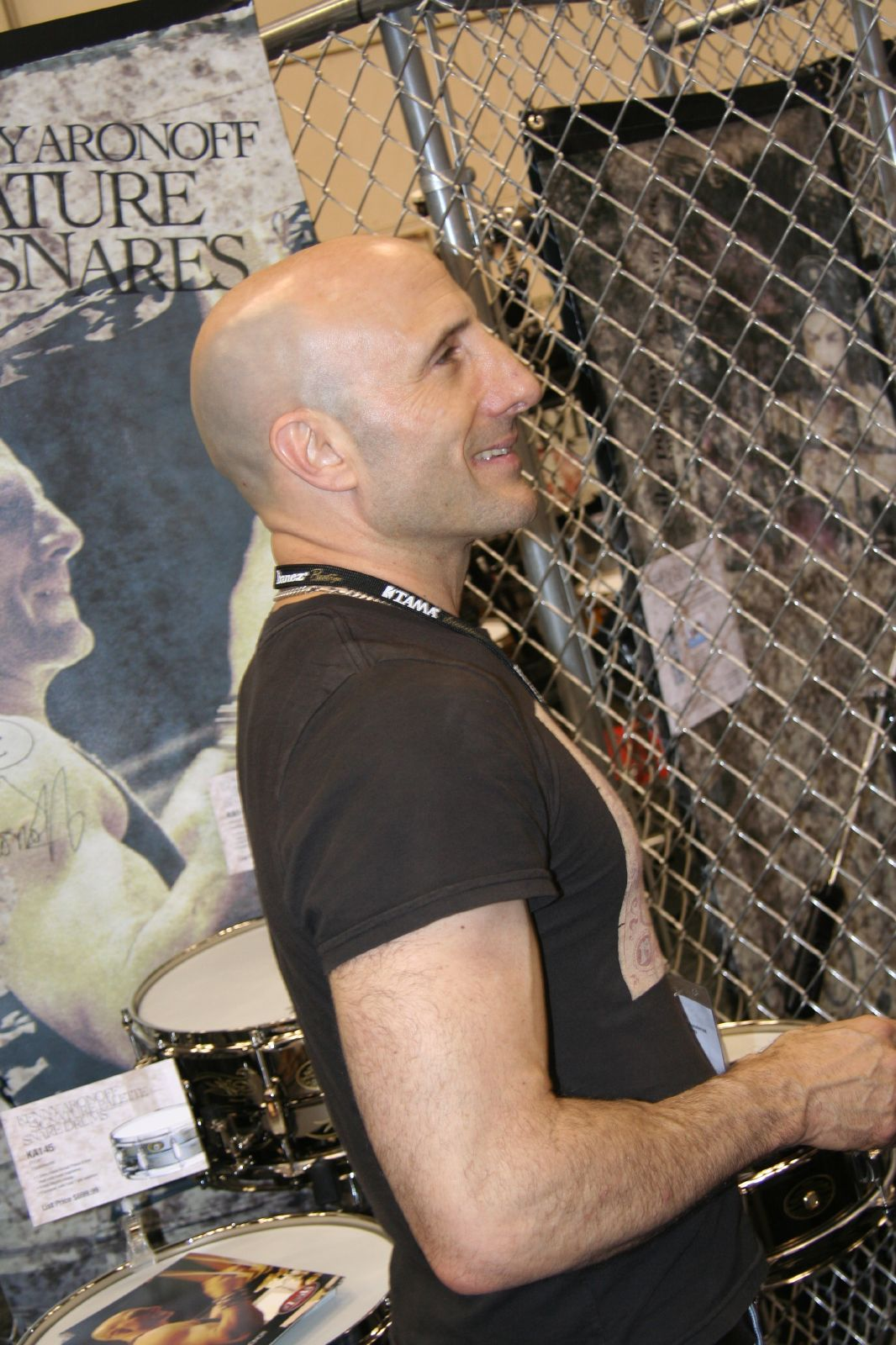
Kenny Aronoff

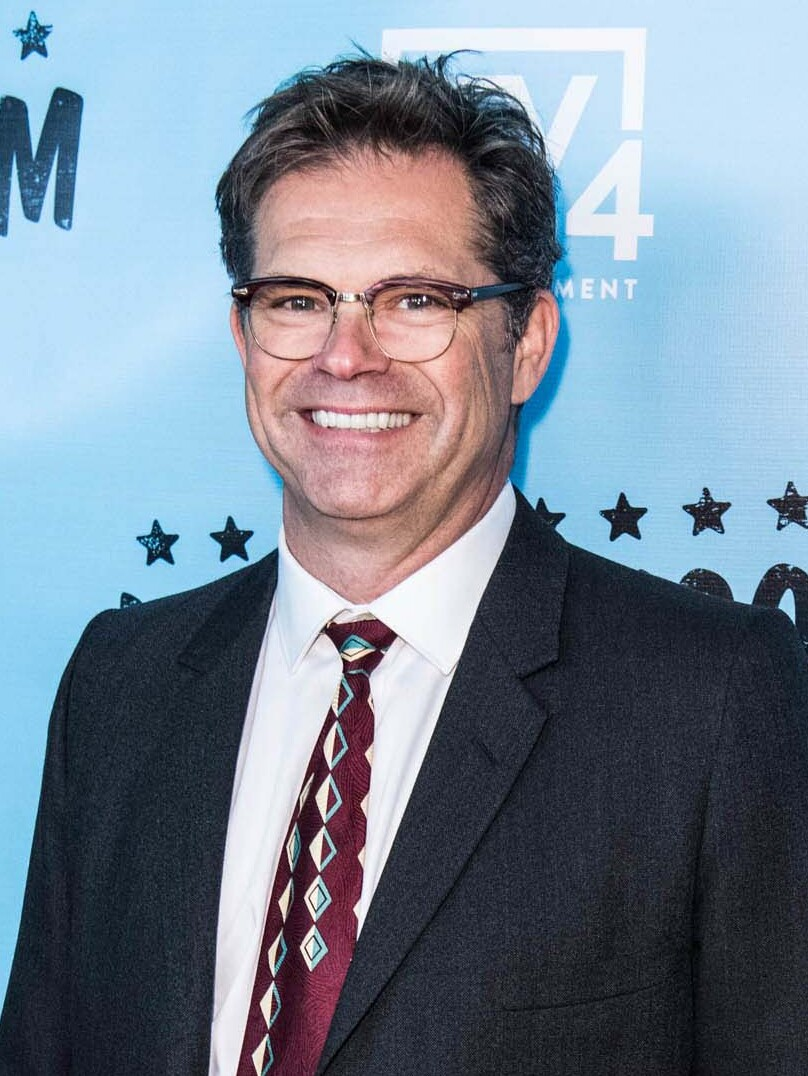
Dana Gould

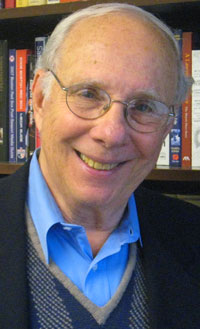
Larry Ruttman

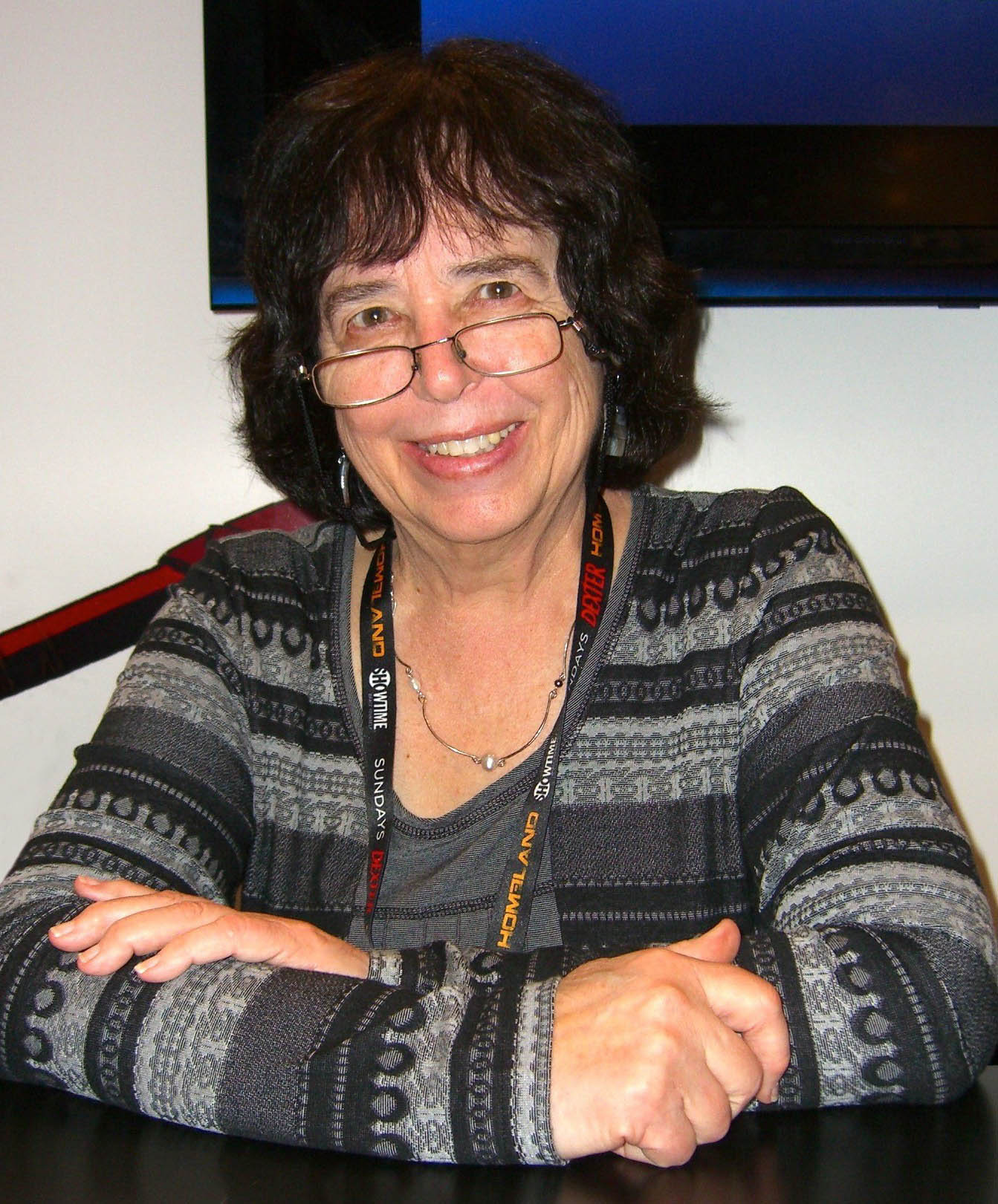
Jane Yolen

- Kenny Aronoff 1975, drummer
- Alison Aune, artist
- Phillip Barron, poet and philosopher
- David Berman, poet, musician
- Frank Black, rock singer and guitarist in the Pixies
- Kathryn Burak, novelist
- Vicente Cabrera Funes 1944, writer
- Jack Canfield 1972G, best-selling author
- Gordon Chandler 1975G, sculptor
- Constance Congdon 1982, M.F.A., playwright
- Bill Cosby 1972G, 1976 Ed.D., actor, comedian, writer
- Patrick DeCoste 2000, guitarist, composer
- Stephanie Deshpande 1997, painter
- Jason Donati, animator and artist
- Sadie Dupuis, singer and guitarist for Speedy Ortiz
- Jason K. Fettig, 28th director of the United States Marine Band
- Lily Fitts, singer
- Harvey Goldman, artist, educator
- Dana Gould 1986, comedian
- James Grinwis, poet
- Peter Hargitai, novelist, poet and translator
- Airline Inthyrath 2006, drag queen known as "Jujubee", performer, TV personality
- Raymond Kennedy, novelist
- Fardeen Khan, Bollywood actor
- Beth Krommes 1980G, children's book illustrator
- Peter Laird, co-creator of Teenage Mutant Ninja Turtles
- Taj Mahal 1963, composer and singer
- William Manchester 1946, author, biographer, and recipient of the National Humanities Medal
- Valerie Martin 1974, novelist
- J Mascis, rock singer and guitarist in Dinosaur Jr
- Matthew Minicucci, poet
- Jeff Penalty (b. Jeff Alulis), former lead singer of Dead Kennedys
- Joe Pernice, singer in Pernice Brothers, Scud Mountain Boys, Chappaquiddick Skyline
- Terri Priest, artist
- Jesse Richards, Stuckist painter, filmmaker, Remodernist film
- Louis Ross 1917, architect, designed many of the campus buildings
- Larry Ruttman 1952, author and attorney
- Buffy Sainte-Marie 1970, singer
- Joey Santiago, guitarist in the Pixies
- Flo Steinberg, of Marvel Comics
- Susan Straight 1984, writer, novelist, professor at the University of California, Riverside
- Paul Theroux 1963, travel writer and author
- Natasha Trethewey 1995, U.S. poet laureate
- Jane Yolen, author
- Matthew Zapruder, poet

== Athletics ==
=== Baseball ===
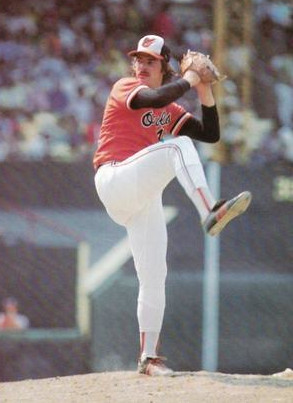
Mike Flanagan

- Ben Cherington 1998G, executive vice president and general manager of the Boston Red Sox
- Chick Davies 1914, pitcher and outfielder with the Philadelphia Athletics and New York Giants
- Gary DiSarcina 1995, MLB All-Star, California Angels
- Mike Flanagan 1975, 1979 Cy Young Award winner, Baltimore Orioles
- Nick Gorneault 2001, outfielder, Los Angeles Angels
- Bob Hansen, first baseman, Milwaukee Brewers
- Neal Huntington MA, general manager of the Pittsburgh Pirates
- Dave Littlefield 1984, senior vice president and general manager of the Pittsburgh Pirates
- Chad Paronto, relief pitcher, Houston Astros
- Jeff Reardon 1977, relief pitcher Minnesota Twins, Montreal Expos, Boston Red Sox
- Mike Stone 1981, Vermont and UMass baseball coach
- Dave Telgheder, starting pitcher, New York Mets
- Ron Villone 1992, relief pitcher, St. Louis Cardinals

=== Basketball ===
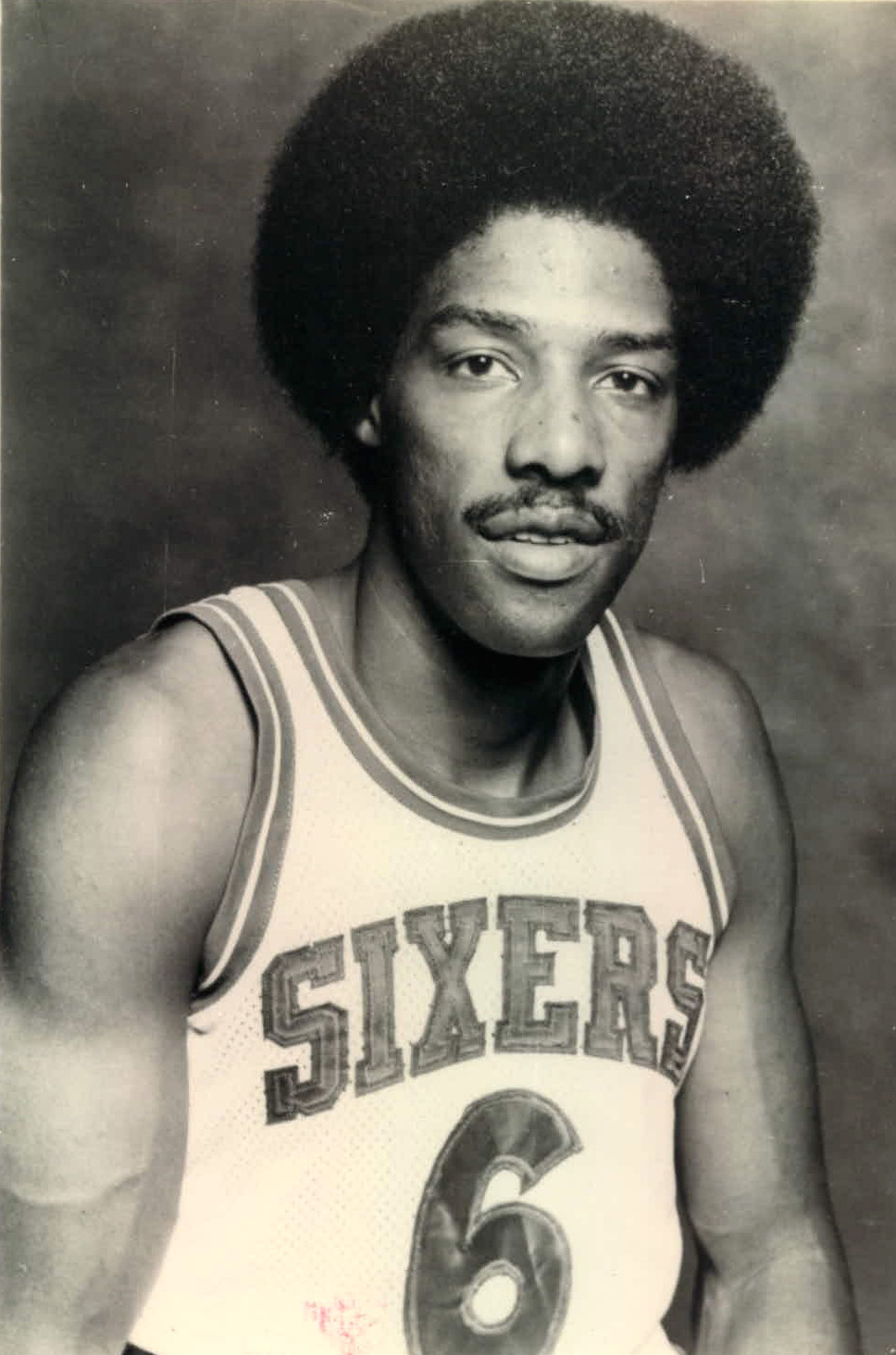
Julius Erving

- Tony Barbee 1993, collegiate basketball coach, Central Michigan University
- Bill Bayno (did not graduate), Division 1 collegiate coach and professional assistant coach
- Marcus Camby, 1996 Naismith College Player of the Year and retired professional basketball player
- Julius Erving 1972, Hall of Fame professional basketball player (received earned bachelor's and honorary doctorate simultaneously)
- Gary Forbes 2008, professional basketball player, Toronto Raptors
- Derek Kellogg 1995, collegiate basketball coach University of Massachusetts Amherst
- Stéphane Lasme 2007, professional basketball player, Miami Heat
- Gloria Nevarez 1993, sports administrator and commissioner of the Mountain West Conference (2023–present)
- Rick Pitino 1974, professional and collegiate basketball coach
- Raphiael Putney 2014, basketball player for Maccabi Haifa of the Israeli National League
- Lou Roe 1995, professional basketball player, Detroit Pistons and Golden State Warriors
- Al Skinner 1974, basketball coach, Boston College

=== Football ===
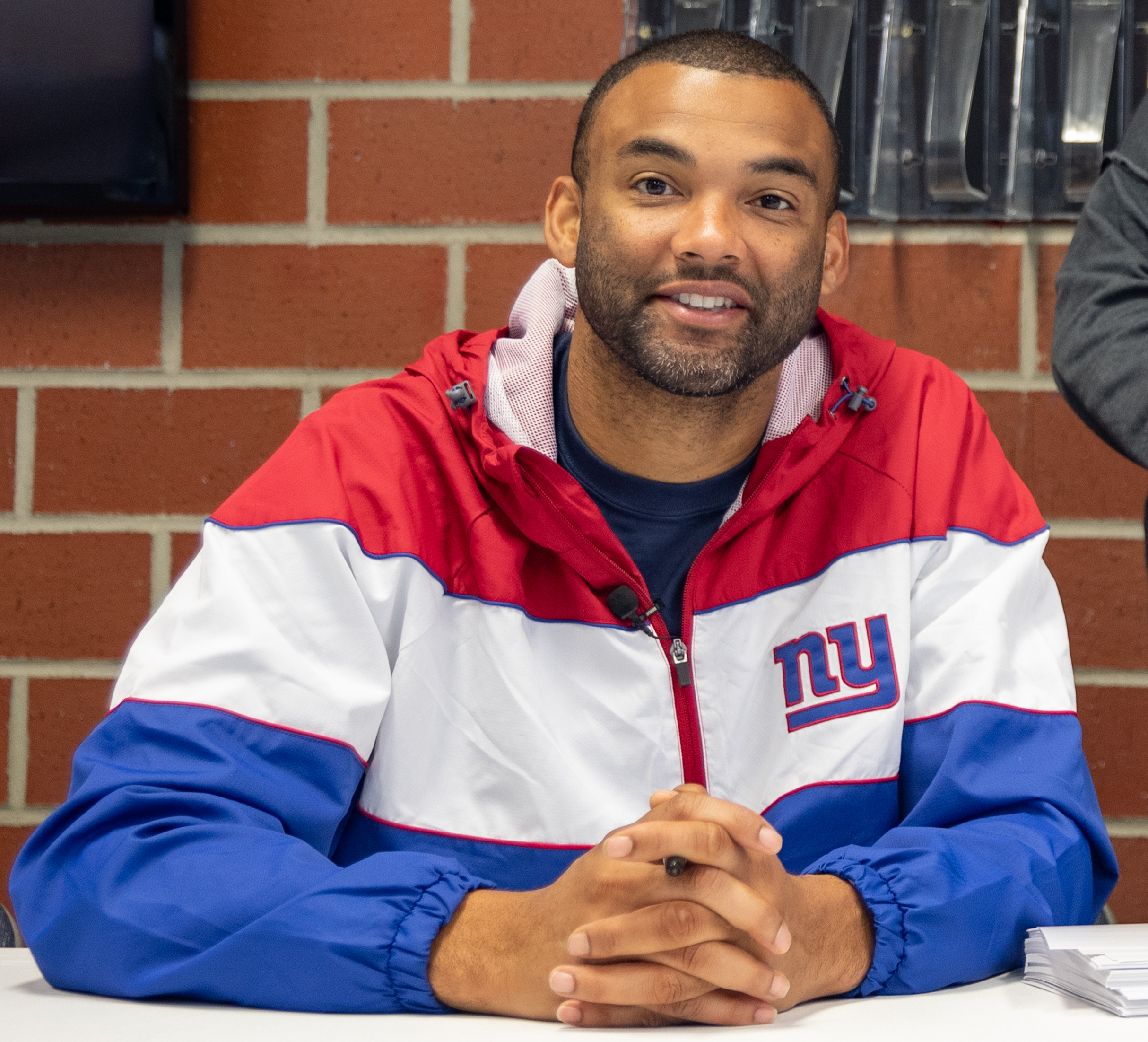
Brandon London

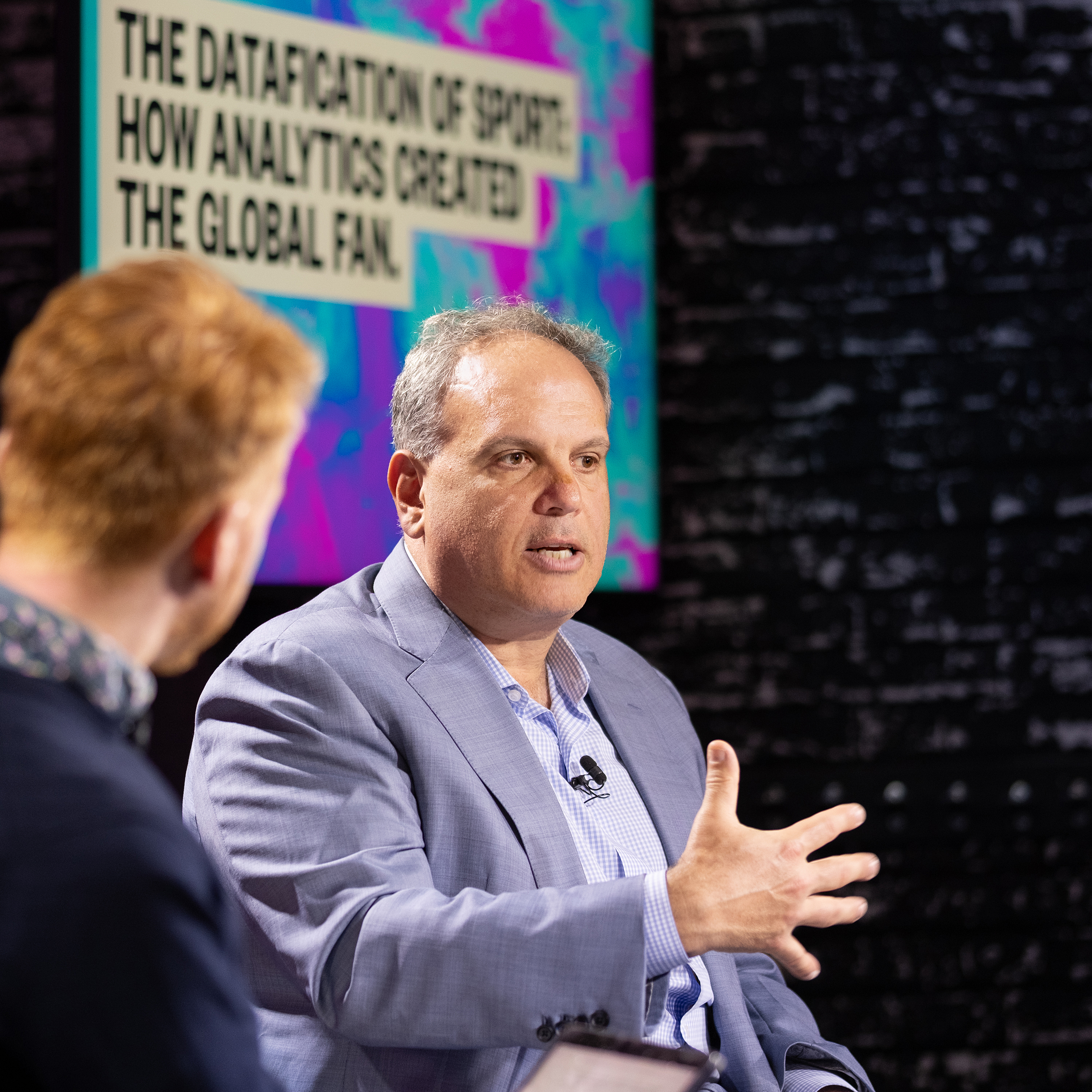
Mike Tannenbaum

- Neal Brown, Texas Tech Red Raiders offensive coordinator
- Liam Coen 2008, head coach, Jacksonville Jaguars
- Victor Cruz 2010, professional football player and 2012 Super Bowl Champion, New York Giants; second-team All-Pro (2011) Pro Bowl (2012)
- Vladimir Ducasse, professional football player, Buffalo Bills
- Tom Gilson, American football player
- Chris Grier, general manager of the Miami Dolphins since 2016
- Jeremy Horne, professional football player, Kansas City Chiefs
- James Ihedigbo, professional football player, Buffalo Bills
- Andy Isabella, wide receiver, Buffalo Bills
- Greg Landry 1968, quarterback, Detroit Lions
- Brandon London 2006, professional football player, Miami Dolphins
- John McCormick 1961, professional football quarterback/punter, Minnesota Vikings, Denver Broncos
- Jeromy Miles, professional football player, Cincinnati Bengals
- Milt Morin 1966, tight end, All-Pro, Cleveland Browns
- Tajae Sharpe 2016, professional football player, Atlanta Falcons
- Marcel Shipp, running back, Arizona Cardinals (former team), 2009 UFL Champions Las Vegas Locomotives
- Mike Tannenbaum, former general manager of the New York Jets

=== Hockey ===
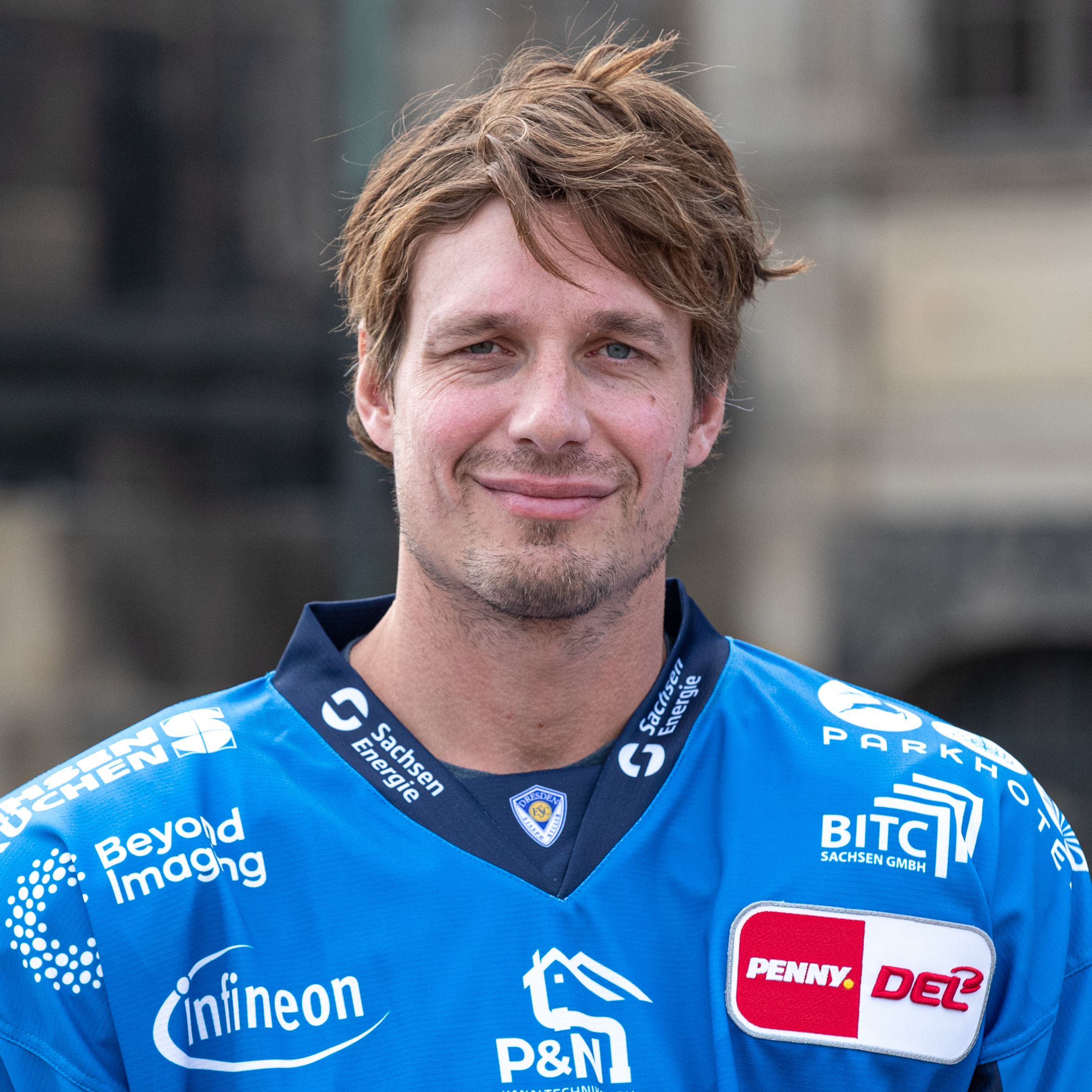
Justin Braun

- David Branch, former president of the Canadian Hockey League
- Justin Braun, professional ice hockey player, San Jose Sharks
- Matt Irwin, professional ice hockey player, Nashville Predators
- John Lyons, Olympic ice hockey player, 1924 Olympic silver medalist
- Cale Makar, professional ice hockey player, 2022 Conn Smythe winner, Colorado Avalanche
- James Marcou, professional ice hockey player, San Jose Sharks
- Brad Norton 1998, professional ice hockey player
- Thomas Pock, professional ice hockey player, New York Islanders
- Jonathan Quick, professional ice hockey player; 2010 Olympic silver medalist; 2012 NHL All-Star; 2012 Conn Smythe winner; 2014 Stanley Cup Champion, Los Angeles Kings
- Conor Sheary, professional ice hockey player, 2016 Stanley Cup Champion, Pittsburgh Penguins
- Frank Vatrano, professional ice hockey player, Florida Panthers
- Casey Wellman, professional ice hockey player, Washington Capitals

=== Lacrosse ===
- Sal LoCascio, retired professional lacrosse goaltender
- Doc Schneider, professional lacrosse player, Toronto Nationals

=== Other sports ===
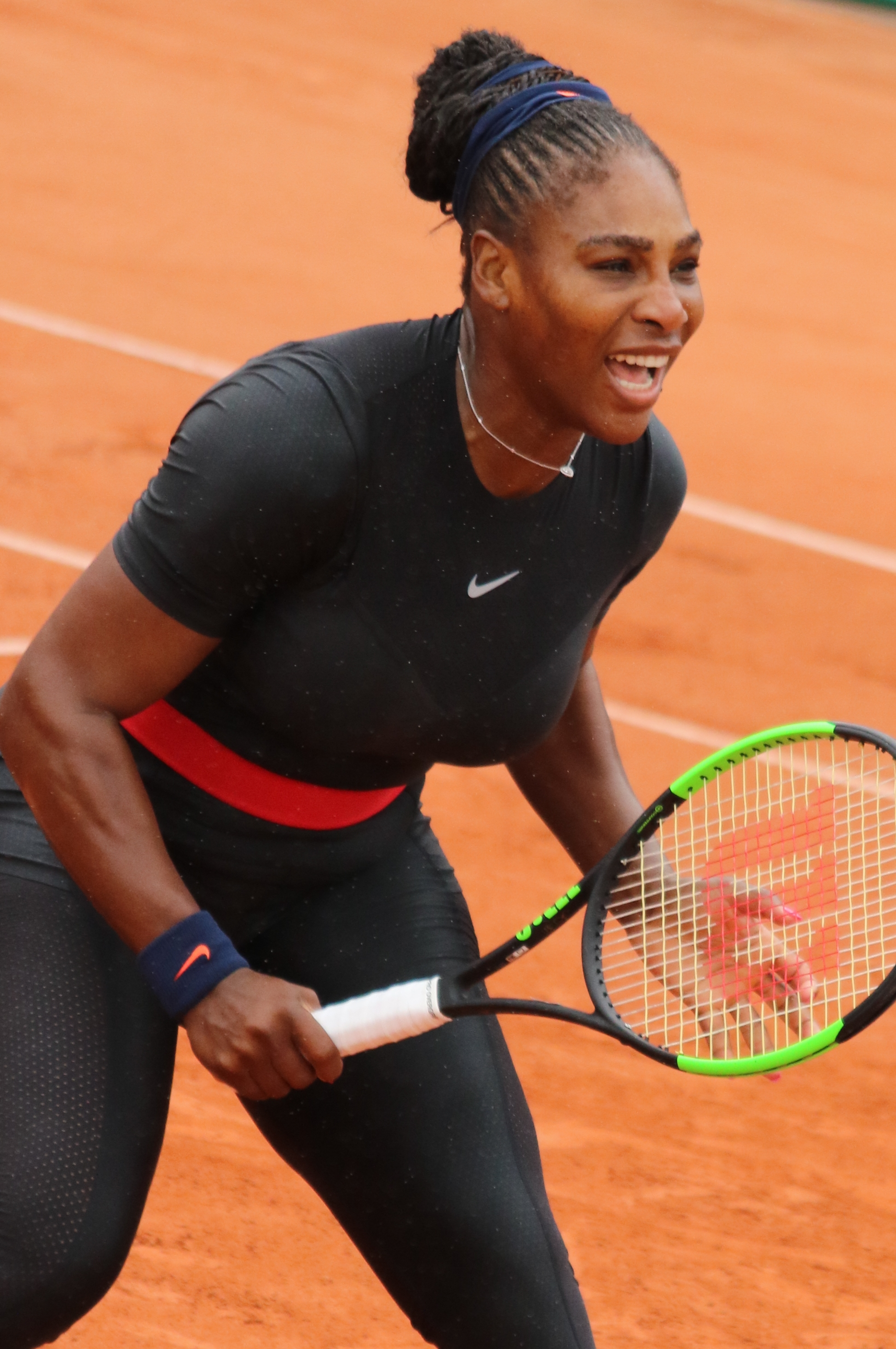
Serena Williams

- Gideon Ariel, Israeli Olympic competitor in the shot put and discus throw
- Danielle Henderson 1999, Olympic gold medal winner, softball
- Roxanne Modafferi, professional mixed martial artist
- Chris Sanford, The Ultimate Fighter Season 1 contestant, retired professional MMA fighter
- Briana Scurry 1995, two-time Olympic gold medal winner and women's World Cup champion, soccer
- Serena Williams, tennis player, four-time Olympic gold medalist and 23-time Grand Slam winner

== Others ==
- Maura Murray, nursing student completing her junior year; disappeared in 2004, after a car crash on Route 112 near Woodsville
- Julie Robenhymer, former Miss New Jersey
- MrBallen, YouTuber, podcaster and storyteller

== See also ==
- University of Massachusetts Amherst
