= Mary Lou Heiss =

Mary Lou Heiss (1950 - 2017) was an American tea connoisseur, historian and author.

== Life ==
She was born in 1950.

She completed her Bachelor's Degree in English from UMass Amherst in 1972.

She died in 2017 due to complications from MDS, a rare blood cancer.

== Career ==
She and her husband Bob started their careers as food entrepreneurs in 1974 on Green Street in Northampton with a coffee, tea, & spice shop under the name Coffee Gallery. They became experts in sourcing tea, coffee and many other specialty foods during their 40 years operating their brick & mortar store in Northampton, MA. Theirs was one of the first specialty food stores in the US.

In 2000 they started traveling extensively to East Asia to source the premium teas that were just starting to become available for export from China, and also Japan, Korea, and Taiwan. Mary Lou made numerous solo journeys to East Asia to both source and photograph tea and the tea culture of that region. Mary Lou was one of the first premium tea merchants to insist on providing the harvest date on the seasonal teas offered by their tea company Tea Trekker.

She has been nominated for the James Beard Award for Reference and Scholarship for their co-authored book The Story of Tea: A Cultural History and Drinking Guide, published in 2007 by Ten Speed Press, a division of Random House.

She and her husband have been described by the New York Times as 'The Professors of Tea' .

== Bibliography ==
Her notable books are:

- The Story of Tea: A Cultural History and Drinking Guide
- The Tea Enthusiast's Handbook: A Guide to the World's Best Teas
- Green Tea: 50 Hot Drinks, Cool Quenchers, And Sweet And Savory Treats
- Hot Drinks: Cider, Coffee, Tea, Hot Chocolate, Spiced Punch, Spirits
