= Deepak Ananthapadmanabha =

American online journalist and comedian

- Born: Deepak Colundalur Ananthapadmanabha; New York City, U.S.
- Education: University of Massachusetts Amherst; Pratt Institute
- Notable work: MOJO HD

Comedy career
- Medium: Journalist, comedian

Deepak Colundalur Ananthapadmanabha is an American online journalist and comedian based in New York City who hosted "The Circuit", a weekly online show on MOJO HD. Deepak is a high school art teacher and co-host of the stand up/music showcase AbeMixture, which occurs monthly at Pacific Standard bar in Park Slope, Brooklyn. He is also the voice of the announcer on Baking W/ Mercury.

== Education ==
From 1993 to 1998 Ananthapadmanabha attended the University of Massachusetts Amherst, earning a B.A. in Communications. In 2006 he received his M.S. in Art and Design Education from Pratt Institute.

== Show on MOJO HD ==
Ananthapadmanabha hosted "The Circuit" on MOJO HD. The show began in early 2008. The show takes informative coverage of events in technology and entertainment and mixes it with bits of comedy. " it's your proverbial bus ride through the tunnel of gadgetry, it's your hilarious and informative lunch break" Like other online shows, for example Rocket Boom, the show covers cutting-edge developments in the digital world but does so with a light touch.
