= List of University of California, Santa Barbara faculty =

This article lists notable faculty (past and present) of the University of California, Santa Barbara.

== Nobel laureates ==
=== Current faculty ===
- Michel Devoret, Nobel Prize recipient, Physics, 2025
- David Gross, Nobel Prize recipient, Physics, 2004
- Alan Heeger, Nobel Prize recipient, Chemistry, 2000
- Finn Kydland, Nobel Prize recipient, Economics, 2004
- John M. Martinis, Nobel Prize recipient, Physics, 2025
- Shuji Nakamura, Nobel Prize recipient, Physics, 2014

=== Former faculty ===
- Edward C. Prescott, Nobel Prize recipient, Economics, 2004
- Walter Kohn, Nobel Prize recipient, Chemistry, 1998
- Herbert Kroemer, Nobel Prize recipient, Physics, 2000
- John Robert Schrieffer, Nobel Prize recipient, Physics, 1972
- Frank Wilczek, Nobel Prize recipient, Physics, 2004

== Pulitzer Prize ==
- Fredrik Logevall, Pulitzer Prize for History recipient, 2013
- N. Scott Momaday, Pulitzer Prize for Fiction recipient, 1969
- Jeffrey C. Stewart, Pulitzer Prize for Non-Fiction recipient, 2019

== Anthropology ==
- James F. Brooks, historian, Native Americans
- Napoleon Chagnon, pioneer of biologically based interpretation of human reproductive and aggressive behavior
- Brian Fagan
- Garrett Hardin, Professor of Human Ecology from 1963 until his (nominal) retirement in 1978; most known for his papers "The Tragedy of the Commons" and "Lifeboat Ethics: the Case Against Helping the Poor"
- Stuart Tyson Smith, best known for his reconstruction of the ancient Egyptian language for the films Stargate and The Mummy
- John Tooby, pioneer of evolutionary psychology

== Art ==
- Ann Bermingham, art historian
- Henri Dorra, art historian
- Kip Fulbeck
- Gary Hugh Brown, Professor Emeritus of Art at UCSB (1966–2006)

== Botany ==
- Katherine Esau

== Chemical engineering ==
- Jacob Israelachvili

== Chemistry and biochemistry ==
- Thomas C. Bruice, coined the term "bio-organic chemistry", member of National Academy of Science
- Craig Hawker
- Bernard Kirtman, professor
- Bruce H. Lipshutz, professor, made significant contributions to copper catalyzed organic reactions
- Ralph G. Pearson, Emeritus, coined the concepts of "hard" and "soft" for acids and bases
- Galen D. Stucky, early researcher in the field of materials chemistry
- Thomas Weimbs, professor, molecular biologist known for discoveries relating to polycystic kidney disease and ketogenic metabolic therapy

== Chicano studies ==
- Luis Leal
- Horacio Roque Ramírez

== Computer science ==
- Tao Yang
- William Yang Wang, Mellichamp Professor of Mind and Machine Intelligence

== Counseling, clinical, and school psychology ==
- Shane R. Jimerson, 2003 co-recipient of the Lightner Witmer Award from the American Psychological Association; noted for his work in school psychology and traumatic stress
- Tania Israel expert in LGBTQ intervention research and dialogue across political disagreement

== East Asian languages and cultural studies ==
- John Nathan

== Ecology, evolution, and marine biology ==
- Benjamin Halpern – marine biologist, ecologist, and 2016 A.G. Huntsman Award for Excellence in the Marine Sciences winner
- William W. Murdoch, population ecologist known for his research in population regulation and predator-prey relationships

== Electrical and computer engineering ==
- Lawrence Rabiner
- Petar V. Kokotovic

== English ==
- Hugh Kenner, literary critic
- Shirley Geok-lin Lim, poet and literary scholar
- Marvin Mudrick, literary scholar

== Feminist studies ==
- Leila Rupp
- Jacqueline Bobo
- Tania Israel expert in LGBTQ intervention research and dialogue across political disagreement

== Film and media studies ==
- Dick Hebdige

== Geography ==
- Reginald Golledge, pioneer in behavioral geography
- Michael Frank Goodchild, most known for work on GIS, or computer mapping
- David Lopez-Carr
- Waldo R. Tobler, known for his first law of geography

== Geology (now Earth Science) ==
- David Valentine, known for his fundamental work in microbiology, geochemistry and oceans, and his applied work on human impacts and scientific communication.
- Tanya Atwater, instrumental in the development of the theory of plate tectonics
- Stanley Awramik
- Richard Virgil Fisher, volcanologist
- George R Tilton, pioneer in the measurement and application of isotopes to geology

== Germanic, Slavic, and Semitic studies ==
- Laurence Rickels

== Global and international studies ==
- Alison Brysk, Mellichamp Chair in Global Governance
- Mark Juergensmeyer
- Paul Orfalea, founder of the copy-chain Kinko's

== History ==
- James F. Brooks, Professor of History and Anthropology, Native American history
- Alexander DeConde, professor emeritus of History, US diplomatic history
- Dimitrije Đorđević, late Professor of History, Modern Balkan History
- Mary O. Furner, Professor of History, 20th century US
- Tsuyoshi Hasegawa, Professor of History, Russian and Soviet history
- C. Warren Hollister, late Professor of History, Medieval Europe
- Immanuel C. Y. Hsu, late Professor of Chinese history
- Wilbur Jacobs, late Professor of History, Native American and Frontier History
- Nelson Lichtenstein, Professor of History, US Labor
- Albert Lindemann, professor emeritus of History, Modern European history
- Harold Marcuse, Associate Professor, Modern European history
- Joachim Remak, late Professor of History, Modern European History
- W. Patrick McCray, Professor of History, History of Science
- David Rock, professor emeritus of History, Latin American history
- Jeffrey Burton Russell, professor emeritus of History, Medieval European history
- Paul Spickard, Professor of History, 20th-century US, world, and ethnic history
- Jeffrey C. Stewart an American Professor of Black Studies

== Linguistics ==
- Mary Bucholtz
- Wallace Chafe
- Bernard Comrie
- Stefan Th. Gries
- Marianne Mithun
- Sandra A. Thompson

== Materials ==
- Arthur Gossard
- Shuji Nakamura

== Mathematics ==
- Michael G. Crandall, winner of the Leroy P. Steele Prize for Seminal Contribution to Research
- Glen Culler, early innovator in the development of the interactive computing and ARPAnet
- Yitang Zhang

== Mechanical engineering ==
- Henry T. Yang, Chancellor

== Media arts and technology ==
- Curtis Roads

== Molecular and cellular biology ==
- Jamey Marth, molecular and cellular biologist, Director of the Center for Nanomedicine, professor in the Department of Molecular, Cellular and Developmental Biology

== Music ==
- Annie Mottram Craig Batten (1883–1964), singer, vocal instructor, and composer. Taught in the State Teachers' College, Santa Barbara (today, UCSB) during summer session, 1921; head of the Music Department, 1922.
- John Dearman, Grammy Award-winning classical guitarist, member of the Los Angeles Guitar Quartet (LAGQ), Director of Guitar Studies
- Alejandro Planchart, Emeritus, professor of musicology, expert on Guillaume Dufay

== Philosophy ==
- C. Anthony Anderson
- Nathan Salmon

== Physics ==
- David Awschalom, best known for his work in spintronics in semiconductors
- James Hartle, together with Stephen Hawking, proposed the Hartle-Hawking wavefunction of the universe, a specific solution to the Wheeler-deWitt equation meant to explain the initial conditions of the Big Bang cosmology
- James S. Langer
- Joseph Polchinski

== Political science ==
- M. Kent Jennings, one of the founding fathers of political socialization research and theory.
- Benjamin Cohen, leading scholar in the field of international political economy
- Leah Stokes, political scientist specializing in environmental policy

== Psychological and brain sciences ==
- Daphne Bugental, psychologist known for her research on parent-child relationships, infant and child maltreatment, and family violence
- Leda Cosmides, helped pioneer the field of evolutionary psychology
- Michael Gazzaniga, pioneer of cognitive neuroscience

== Religious studies ==
- Walter Capps
- J. Gordon Melton
- Birger A. Pearson
- Ann Taves

== Sociology ==
- Donald Cressey
- John Foran
- Ralph Larkin
- William I. Robinson
- France Winddance Twine
- Howard Winant

== See also ==
- List of University of California, Santa Barbara alumni
