= Ajit Varki =

Indian-American physician and scientist

- Born: Kerala, India
- Known for: Human CMAH inactivation, Primate glycobiology, Discovery of Siglec protein family, Sialic acids
- Awards: NIH MERIT Award, Karl Meyer Award, Herbert Tabor Research Award (Journal of Biological Chemistry)
- Scientific career
- Fields: Glycobiology, Hematology, Sialic acids, Anthropology
- Workplaces: University of California, San Diego, Center for Academic Research and Training in Anthropogeny
- Doctoral advisor: Stuart Kornfeld

Ajit Varki is an Indian-American physician scientist and glycobiologist, known for documenting the first genetic difference between humans and chimpanzees (the human pseudogene CMAH), and discovering the sialic acid-binding protein family known as Siglecs. He is a Distinguished Professor in the Department of Cellular and Molecular Medicine and the Department of Medicine at the University of California, San Diego (UCSD), and a Distinguished Visiting Professor at the Indian Institute of Technology in Madras and the National Center for Biological Sciences in Bangalore.

Along with fellow UCSD-based biologists including Jeffrey Esko, Victor Nizet, and 1974 Nobel Laureate George Palade, he is a founding figure of the Glycobiology Research and Training Center at the UCSD School of Medicine. He is also co-founder the Center for Academic Research and Training in Anthropogeny (CARTA), a collaborative research endeavor of UCSD and the Salk Institute for Biological Studies, along with the anthropologist Margaret Schoeninger and geneticist Fred Gage. Notable members of CARTA include the anthropologists Rick Potts, Leslie C. Aiello, Kirsten Hawkes, the Swiss primatologist Christophe Boesch, and Nobel Laureates Roger Guillemin, George Palade, Svante Pääbo, and Sydney Brenner.

He is an advisor to the Human Gene Nomenclature Committee, and founding editor of the first open-access scientific textbook, Essentials of Glycobiology, which is hosted online by the NCBI Bookshelf platform under the National Library of Medicine.

== Education and biography ==
Varki went to the Bishop Cotton Boys' School, Bangalore, India during which time he was also strongly influenced by his maternal grandfather Pothan Joseph, a famous journalist and founding editor of many Indian newspapers, including Deccan Herald. He went on to receive basic training in physiology, medicine, biology, and biochemistry at the Christian Medical College, Vellore, continuing to maintain the first rank in his class throughout his schooling. He then did postgraduate training at the University of Nebraska–Lincoln and Washington University School of Medicine, leading to board certification in internal medicine, hematology, and oncology. Following a postdoctoral fellowship with Stuart Kornfeld in St. Louis, he joined the faculty of UCSD in 1982. Significant past appointments include: associate dean for physician-scientist training, co-head, Division of Hematology/Oncology, UCSD (1987–89), the interim directorship of the UCSD Cancer Center (1996–97), scientific advisor to the Complex Carbohydrate Research Center (University of Georgia), the Yerkes Primate Center (Emory University), member of the National Advisory Committee of PubMed Central (NLM/NIH), and coordinator for the multidisciplinary UCSD Project for Explaining the Origin of Humans.

== Research interests ==
The research group led by Varki has made many contributions over the last few decades towards understanding the biological roles of the sugar chains or "glycans" found on all vertebrate cell surfaces and glycoproteins. In this field of Glycobiology, his present focus is on the Sialic Acids, which are found at the outermost position on such glycans, and which can be recognized by intrinsic receptors such as Selectins and the Siglecs (which he co-discovered and named as a sub-group of I-type Lectins), and also by the binding proteins of various pathogens. The group studies the significance of these interactions in biology, evolution and disease. A particular focus is on multiple differences in sialic acid biology between humans and our closest evolutionary cousins, the great apes. These represent unusual events that occurred during human evolution and are relevant to understanding aspects of human uniqueness in health and disease.

== General interests ==
Varki has emphasized the key role of Physician-Scientists in the success of the US biomedical enterprise, and advocated for the support and preservation of this track at the national level. He also played a key role in advocating for a chimpanzee genome project, while emphasizing the need for ethical treatment of chimpanzees in research. He continues to advocate for and facilitate interactions amongst scientists with interests in explaining the origin of the human species. In this regard, he coined the term "Phenome", in the context of recommending a "Great Ape Phenome Project". While Editor-in-Chief of the Journal of Clinical Investigation, Varki made it the first major biomedical journal to be freely available on the web in 1996, presaging the general "Open Access" movement that came years later. He also created the first viable model for a major Open Access textbook, the 2nd. Edition of the textbook Essentials of Glycobiology. Varki is also very concerned about improving the support systems for women who pursue academic scientific careers, while also wishing to bear children. Varki and his wife Nissi enjoy entertaining, including a Christmas Carols celebration serving Tandoori goose.

== Open Access ==
While Editor-in-Chief of the Journal of Clinical Investigation, Varki made it the first major biomedical journal to be freely available on the web in 1996. Varki wrote, "The vexing issue of the day is how to appropriately charge users for this electronic access. The nonprofit nature of the JCI allows consideration of a truly novel solution — not to charge anyone at all!". As executive editor of Essentials of Glycobiology, Varki also made it the first major biomedical textbook that was fully open access.

== Diet and disease ==
Varki's group has recently shown that a diet rich in red meat can result in accumulation of a non-human sialic acid molecule called Neu5Gc ("Gc") in the intestines and other tissues. This can allow type of dangerous E.coli toxin to affect the human body. Also, humans develop antibodies against this foreign Gc molecule, increasing the risk of diseases like cancer.

== Mind Over Reality Transition (MORT) ==
Varki developed an idea proposed in 2005 by the late Danny Brower of the University of Arizona into a theory called Mind Over Reality Transition (MORT) which has been published in two letters and two books. MORT proposes an evolutionary mechanism to explain the emergence of behaviorally modern humans and some of their unique behaviors, including an extended theory of mind and a tendency to deny reality.

== Honors ==
Varki is an elected member of the American Academy of Arts and Sciences, the Institute of Medicine, the American Society for Clinical Investigation, and the Association of American Physicians. He is recipient of a MERIT award from the NIH, an American Cancer Society Faculty Research Award, and the two highest honors in the field of glycobiology, the Karl Meyer Award of the Society for Glycobiology (2005) and the International Glycoconjugate Organization (IGO) Award (2007). He was also elected to serve as president of the Society for Glycobiology (1996), Editor-in-Chief of the Journal of Clinical Investigation (1992–97), and president of the American Society for Clinical Investigation (1998–99).

== Selected publications ==
Beyond his primary research accomplishments, Varki has written many widely cited and influential review articles, commentaries and letters on a variety of topics. Some examples are listed below. His publications have been cited more than 90,000 times and he has an h-index of 150.

- Varki A, Holmes E, Yamada T, Agre P, Brenner S (April 2006). "Physician-scientists are needed now more than ever". Nature. 440 (7085): 740. Bibcode:2006Natur.440..740V. doi:10.1038/440740b. PMID 16598232.
- Varki A (September 2006). "Nothing in glycobiology makes sense, except in the light of evolution". Cell. 126 (5): 841–5. doi:10.1016/j.cell.2006.08.022. PMID 16959563. S2CID 17885036.
- Varki A, Angata T (January 2006). "Siglecs—the major subfamily of I-type lectins". Glycobiology. 16 (1): 1R–27R. doi:10.1093/glycob/cwj008. PMID 16014749.
- Varki A (April 2007). "Glycan-based interactions involving vertebrate sialic-acid-recognizing proteins". Nature. 446 (7139): 1023–9. Bibcode:2007Natur.446.1023V. doi:10.1038/nature05816. PMID 17460663. S2CID 4426872.
- Crocker PR, Paulson JC, Varki A (April 2007). "Siglecs and their roles in the immune system". Nature Reviews Immunology. 7 (4): 255–66. doi:10.1038/nri2056. PMID 17380156. S2CID 26722878.

== See also ==
- Glycomics
- Genome
