= George Ashwell =

George Ashwell may refer to:

- George Gilbert Ashwell (1916–2014), American biochemist
- George Ashwell (controversialist) (1612–1695), Anglo-Catholic controversialist
