= School of Biological Sciences =

School of Biological Sciences may refer to:

- Cold Spring Harbor Laboratory School of Biological Sciences
- Irell & Manella Graduate School of Biological Sciences
- School of Biological Sciences, University of Manchester
- UCI School of Biological Sciences
- UEA School of Biological Sciences
- University of Sydney School of Biological Sciences
- UC San Diego School of Biological Sciences
