= Jamey Marth =

American Biologist

- Born: Sarasota, Florida
- Education: University of Washington
- Scientific career
- Fields: Molecular biology Cellular biology Inflammatory diseases Immunology; Glycobiology
- Workplaces: SBP Medical Discovery Institute; UC Santa Barbara; Howard Hughes Medical Institute; UC San Diego
- Doctoral advisors: Roger M. Perlmutter and Edwin G. Krebs

Jamey Marth is a molecular and cellular biologist. He is currently on the faculty of the SBP Medical Discovery Institute in La Jolla, California where he is Director of the Immunity and Pathogenesis program.

His research has largely focused on how protein glycosylation contributes to the origins of common diseases and syndromes including diabetes, sepsis, colitis, and autoimmunity.

== Education ==
Marth earned a Ph.D. in Pharmacology from the University of Washington in 1987. During his time at Washington as a graduate student, he was mentored by Roger M. Perlmutter and Edwin G. Krebs. Marth was Perlmutter's first graduate student.

== Career ==
Following his time as a staff scientist at Oncogen Corporation in Seattle, Marth was recruited to the founding faculty of the Biomedical Research Centre in Vancouver, British Columbia, Canada, where he was also appointed as a professor in the Department of Medical Genetics at the University of British Columbia. In 1995, George Palade and Marilyn Farquhar (among others) recruited Marth to the University of California, San Diego (UCSD) in the Department of Cellular and Molecular Medicine. Upon his arrival, he was appointed as an Investigator of the Howard Hughes Medical Institute. Marth spent more than 14 years in this position at UCSD. His research at HHMI and UCSD helped bolster an already renowned glycobiology program that originated with Ajit Varki and later included Jeffrey Esko.

In 2009, he accepted a position at the University of California, Santa Barbara (UCSB) and the Sanford-Burnham Medical Research Institute as the Director of the Center for Nanomedicine. He also then became the inaugural recipient of the Carbon Chair in Biochemistry and Molecular Biology and the recipient of the Mellichamp Chair of Systems Biology.

== Research ==
Marth's research is credited with the development of methodologies applicable to investigating the origins of disease. His conception and co-development of Cre-Lox conditional mutagenesis has provided a means to further perceive the mechanistic underpinnings of disease, and continues to be used by scientists worldwide. Prior to the development of conditional mutagenesis, the use of homologous recombination was limited to systemic gene targeting and mutation. Marth's use of Cre-Lox conditional mutagenesis established the presence and functions of multiple and in some cases previously unknown enzymes participating in protein glycosylation, an area of research that has become a focus of exploration of the genetic and metabolic origins of disease. Marth also used Cre-Lox mutagenesis to establish a reproducible method for obtaining animal models of essential X chromosome-linked genes.

Marth's early studies of glycosylation and glycan linkages revealed a profound effect on immunity and contributed to the genesis of the related sub-field termed glycoimmunology. Marth's laboratory discovered connections between aberrant glycan linkages and autoimmune diseases including the fact that the exposure of cryptic immature glycan linkages in mammals could initiate chronic sterile inflammation leading to the development of autoimmunity. Those findings indicated that autoimmunity can be precipitated by the presence of abnormal glycan structures within the body.

Marth's laboratory has also taken a close look at the molecular and cellular bases of Type 2 diabetes and the role that protein glycosylation plays in the origin of the disease. Their research demonstrated that acquired pancreatic beta cell dysfunction was the major contributor of disease onset and corroborated views that genetic variation was unlikely to be the primary cause of obesity-associated Type 2 diabetes in humans. Instead, their findings revealed that altered pancreatic beta cell glycosylation resulting from elevated fatty acid levels in obesity disabled glucose sensing, resulting in hyperglycemia with glucose intolerance. Marth's research team further found that this pathway was induced in human patients with Type 2 diabetes and was responsible for a significant amount of the insulin resistance present in experimentally-induced obesity-associated diabetes.

The pathological underpinnings of inflammatory diseases including sepsis have also been the subject of research by Marth's laboratory. Marth and colleagues discovered the first physiological purpose of the Ashwell-Morell Receptor (AMR), a hepatocyte lectin discovered by Gilbert Ashwell and Anatol Morell. Marth's studies revealed the presence of an intrinsic mechanism of secreted protein aging and turnover first proposed by Ashwell and Morell in the 1960s, and which participates in controlling the half-lives and functions of secreted and cell surface glycoproteins. Their studies further identified how AMR function can be modulated for therapeutic purposes.

In 2008, Marth published an initial enumeration of the building blocks of life, all of which fall under the four types of cellular macromolecules (glycans, lipids, nucleic acids, and proteins). This accounting has become an educational feature of cell biology texts. Marth and other colleagues have called attention to the fact that only half of these macromolecules are encoded by the genome, suggesting that a more holistic approach is needed in biomedical research to fully understand and intervene in the origins and progression of disease.

== Selected publications ==
- Grewal, P.K.; Aziz, P.Z.; Uchiyama, S.; Rubio, G.R.; Lardone, R.D.; Le, D.; Varki, N.; Nizet, V.; Marth, J.D. (2013). "Inducing host protection in pneumococcal sepsis by preactivation of the Ashwell-Morell receptor". Proc. Natl. Acad. Sci. USA. 110 (50): 20218–20223. Bibcode:2013PNAS..11020218G. doi:10.1073/pnas.1313905110. PMC 3864324. PMID 24284176.
- Ohtsubo, K.; Chen, M. Z.; Olefsky, J.M.; Marth, J.D. (2011). "Pathway to diabetes through attenuation of pancreatic beta cell glycosylation and glucose transport". Nat. Med. 17 (9): 1067–1075. doi:10.1038/nm.2414. PMC 3888087. PMID 21841783.
- Grewal, P.K.; Uchiyama, S.; Ditto, D.; Varki, N.; Le, D.T.; Nizet, V.; Marth, J.D. (2008). "The Ashwell receptor mitigates the lethal coagulopathy of sepsis". Nat. Med. 14 (6): 648–655. doi:10.1038/nm1760. PMC 2853759. PMID 18488037.
- Marth, J.D. (2008). "A unified vision of the building blocks of life". Nat. Cell Biol. 10 (9): 1015–1016. doi:10.1038/ncb0908-1015. PMC 2892900. PMID 18758488.
- Marth, J.D.; Grewal, P.K. (2008). "Mammalian glycosylation in immunity". Nat. Rev. Immunol. 8 (11): 874–887. doi:10.1038/nri2417. PMC 2768770. PMID 18846099.
- Green, R.S.; Stone, E.L. Tenno; Lehtonen, E.; Farquhar, M.G.; Marth, J.D. (2007). "Mammalian N-glycan branching protects against innate immune self-recognition and inflammation in autoimmune disease pathogenesis". Immunity. 27 (2): 308–320. doi:10.1016/j.immuni.2007.06.008. PMID 17681821.
- Ohtsubo, K.; Marth, J.D. (2006). "Glycosylation in cellular mechanisms of health and disease". Cell. 126 (5): 855–867. doi:10.1016/j.cell.2006.08.019. PMID 16959566. S2CID 9474696.
- Ohtsubo, K., and Marth, J.D. (2006). Conditional mutagenesis of the genome using site-specific DNA recombination. In: Gene Transfer: Delivery and Expression of DNA and RNA, A laboratory Manual (Friedman and Rossi; eds) Cold Spring Harbor Press, N.Y., pp. 587–602.
- Grewal, P.K.; Boton, M.; Rameriz, K.; Collins, B.E.; Saito, A.; Green, R.S.; Ohtsubo, K.; Chui, D.; Marth, J.D. (2006). "ST6Gal-I restrains CD22-dependent antigen receptor endocytosis and Shp-1 recruitment in normal and pathogenic immune signaling". Mol. Cell. Biol. 26 (13): 4970–4981. doi:10.1128/mcb.00308-06. PMC 1489171. PMID 16782884.
- Ohtsubo, K.; Takamatsu, S.; Minowa, M.T.; Yoshida, A.; Takeuchi, M.; Marth, J.D. (2005). "Dietary and genetic control of glucose transporter-2 glycosylation promotes insulin secretion in suppressing diabetes". Cell. 123 (7): 1307–1321. doi:10.1016/j.cell.2005.09.041. PMID 16377570. S2CID 14509553.
- Chui, D.; Sellakumar, G.; Green, R.; Sutton-Smith, M.; McQuistan, T.; Marek, K.; Morris, H.; Dell, A.; Marth, J.D. (2001). "Genetic remodeling of protein glycosylation in vivo induces autoimmune disease". Proc Natl Acad Sci USA. 98 (3): 1142–1147. Bibcode:2001PNAS...98.1142C. doi:10.1073/pnas.98.3.1142. PMC 14722. PMID 11158608.
- Chui, D.; Oh-Eda, M.; Liao, Y.F.; Panneerselvam, K.; Lal, A.; Marek, K.W.; Freeze, H.H.; Moremen, K.W.; Fukuda, M.N.; Marth, J.D. (1997). "Alpha-mannosidase-II deficiency results in dyserythropoiesis and unveils an alternate pathway in oligosaccharide biosynthesis". Cell. 90 (1): 157–67. doi:10.1016/s0092-8674(00)80322-0. PMID 9230311. S2CID 6064567.
- Hennet, T; Hagen, F K; Tabak, L A; Marth, J D (1995-12-19). "T-cell-specific deletion of a polypeptide N-acetylgalactosaminyl-transferase gene by site-directed recombination". Proceedings of the National Academy of Sciences of the United States of America. 92 (26): 12070–12074. ISSN 0027-8424. PMID 8618846.
- Orban, P. C.; Chui, D.; Marth, J. D. (1992-08-01). "Tissue- and site-specific DNA recombination in transgenic mice". Proceedings of the National Academy of Sciences of the United States of America. 89 (15): 6861–6865.
