= Center for Academic Research and Training in Anthropogeny =

Human evolution research group at UC San Diego

Coordinates: 32.8799°N 117.2361°W

CARTA logo

The Center for Academic Research and Training in Anthropogeny (CARTA) is a La Jolla, California-based collaborative and international research institute on human evolution hosted by the University of California, San Diego (UCSD) and the Salk Institute for Biological Studies, with additional support from the San Diego Supercomputer Center and Qualcomm Institute (formerly Calit2). It was organized from an existing, informal collaboration into a UCSD-Salk Institute research unit in 2008 by UCSD faculty members Ajit Varki (School of Medicine), Margaret Schoeninger (Deparment of Anthropology), and then-director of the Salk Institute Fred Gage.

It hosts regular symposia at the Salk Institute where research leaders in various fields related to human evolution present their latest findings and perspectives. It also administrates a specialization track for several PhD programs at the University of California, San Diego including in the Department of Anthropology, the Jacobs School of Engineering, the School of Biological Sciences, the School of Medicine, and the Rady School of Management.

== History ==
In the 1990s, faculty at UCSD organized an informal research collaboration focusing on human origins, with Varki serving as coordinator. Participants were worldwide and multidisciplinary, and met several times prior to the organization of formal meetings in March 2004. That symposium focused on the ongoing Chimpanzee genome projects and was titled "Sequencing the Chimpanzee Genome: What Have We Learned?". It featured the Swedish geneticist and later (2022) Nobel laureate Svante Pääbo, the cognitive primatologist Tetsuro Matsuzawa, the American geneticist Bob Waterston (who pioneered C. elegans as a model organism), and the 2002 Nobel laureate Sydney Brenner. Other Nobel prize-winning CARTA members include Roger Guillemin (1977), George Emil Palade (1974), and Francis Crick (1962).

Before CARTA was established as an Organized Research Unit under UCSD's nomenclature, a multidisciplinary effort to study human origins had already been underway in the La Jolla area for more than a decade, coordinated by the then-named "UCSD Project for Explaining the Origin of Humans" (POH) and containing various faculty and researchers affiliated with UCSD, the Salk Institute, the Scripps Research Institute, and others. The POH group involved local experts in San Diego as well as many others throughout the world. The primary activity of the POH was to organize multidisciplinary meetings amongst members via meetings in La Jolla and using early internet-based tools. These efforts were converted into a larger and more publicly active center in conjunction with the Salk Institute, which facilitated the graduate specialization track in relevant departments.

== Organization ==
The Salk Institute for Biological Studies, where CARTA symposia are hosted.

At UC San Diego and the Salk Institute, its leadership includes:

- Current co-directors:
  - Pascal Gagneux (Executive Co-Director, UCSD)
  - Katerina Semendeferi (UCSD)
  - Gerald Joyce (President (2023–Present), Salk Institute).
- Emeriti co-directors (2008-2022):
  - Ajit Varki (UCSD, Salk Institute)
  - Margaret Schoeninger (UCSD)
  - Fred Gage (Professor and former President (2018–2023), Salk Institute)

== Activities ==
=== Symposia ===
CARTA symposia are hosted either in-person at the Salk Institute in La Jolla, California or via remote webinars. These typically feature a topic of focus, with notable researchers speaking on how their disciplines and work contribute to that topic.

Hosts and participants of previous symposia include researchers from a wide varity of scientific disciplines, mostly related to biology, anthropology, or archaeology:

- Stephen C. Stearns
- Francis Collins
- Mary-Claire King
- Yohannes Haile-Selassie
- Evan E. Eichler
- Andrew G. Clark
- Maynard Olson
- Frans de Waal
- Randolph M. Nesse
- Bernard Wood (paleoanthropologist)
- Jean-Jacques Hublin
- Richard Klein (paleoanthropologist)
- Fred Gage
- Haig Kazazian
- John Moran (geneticist)
- Jef Boeke
- David Perlmutter (linguist)
- Paul Smolensky
- Stephen R. Anderson
- Henry Harpending
- Steven E. Churchill
- Marye Anne Fox
- Leslie C. Aiello

=== Other activities ===
CARTA also curates the UCSD Museum of Primatology (MOP), a collection of chimpanzee and nonhuman primate skeletons including 3D digitization and IT integration and the Matrix of Comparative Anthropogeny (MOCA), a free, searchable compilation of comparative primatology and human evolution information that highlights the differences between humans and other apes apes, with an emphasis on uniquely human features, and compiles a chronological list of book titles relevant to exploring human origins and human evolution.
