= William Yang =

William Yang may refer to:

- William Yang (photographer), Australian social history photographer, playwright, artist and filmmaker
- William Yang (swimmer), Australian swimmer

== See also ==
- William Yang Wang, computer scientist and academic
