= Kay Dian Kriz =

Professor emerita of Art and Architecture

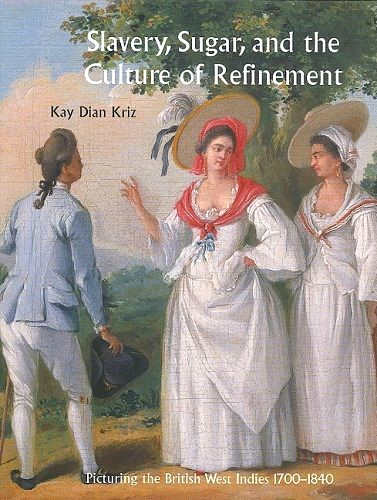
The cover of Slavery, sugar and the culture of refinement: Picturing the British West Indies, 1700-1840 (2008)

Kay Dian Kriz (born 1945) is professor emerita of art and architecture at Brown University. She is a specialist in British landscape painting and the visual culture of British colonialism and West Indian slavery.

== Early life ==
Kay Dian Kriz was born in 1945 in Fullerton, California and graduated from FJ Reitz High School in 1962 and was valedictorian of her class. She received her Bachelor of Science from Indiana University Bloomington in 1966, her Bachelor of Arts from Western Washington University in 1981 and her MA and PhD from the University of British Columbia in 1984 and 1991 respectively.

== Career ==
Kriz was a member of the faculty of Brown University from where she retired in 2013. She is currently professor emerita of art and architecture at Brown. She is a specialist in British landscape painting and the visual culture of British colonialism and West Indian slavery.

Kriz's first book was The idea of the English landscape painter: Genius as alibi in the early nineteenth century. Writing in Eighteenth-Century Studies, Ann Bermingham described the book as "an illuminating analysis of the place that landscape painting and landscape painters held within the evolving nationalistic discourse of aesthetics in the early nineteenth century" which explained how, "spurred by nationalist sentiments provoked by the Napoleonic wars, the English configuration of artistic "genius" was formulated in opposition to the French school of painting." In a positive review of Kriz's Slavery, sugar, and the culture of refinement (2008), Christer Petley in H-Net praised Kriz for her insights into the visual representations of the West Indies and slavery between the late seventeenth century and the mid-nineteenth century".

== Selected publications ==
- "An English Arcadia revisited and reassessed: Holman Hunt's The Hireling Shepherd and the rural tradition", Art History, Volume 10 (1987), pages 475–91.
- The idea of the English landscape painter: Genius as alibi in the early nineteenth century. Yale University Press, New Haven, 1997. ISBN 978-0300068337
- An economy of colour: Visual culture and the Atlantic world, 1660-1830. Manchester University Press, Manchester, 2003. (Co-editor with Geoff Quilley) ISBN 978-0719060052
- Slavery, sugar and the culture of refinement: Picturing the British West Indies, 1700-1840. Yale University Press, New Haven, 2008. ISBN 9780300140620
