= Brundin =

Brundin is a Swedish surname. Notable people with the surname include:

- Clark L. Brundin (born 1931), Vice-chancellor of the University of Warwick
- Bo Brundin (1937–2022), Swedish actor
- Patrik Brundin (born 1961), Swedish neurologist
- Folke Brundin (born 1963), Swedish rower
- Michael Brundin (born 1965), Swedish footballer
