= Stillwater Marsh =

- U.S. National Register of Historic Places
- Location within Nevada Location within the United States
- Nearest city: Fallon, Nevada
- Area: 10,520 acres (4,260 ha)
- NRHP reference No.: 75001104
- Added to NRHP: March 19, 1975

Stillwater Marsh is an archaeology locality in the Carson Sink in western Nevada discovered when heavy flooding in the 1980s unearthed many human remains. The great diversity in plant life and altitudinally-determined microenvironments that surrounded the marsh helped to make it a popular place to live, as evidenced by archaeological findings. At Stillwater Marsh, skeletal remains were the primary means used to determine how people lived in the area. As large numbers of skeletons had not previously been found at Great Basin sites, Stillwater Marsh offered a remarkable opportunity to learn about daily life, as reflected in the human remains.

A 10,520-acre (4,260 ha) area of the site was listed on the National Register of Historic Places in 1975 as Stillwater Marsh, which provides limited protections.

== Skeletal Remains ==
Flooding in the Great Basin between 1982 and 1986 unearthed approximately 4,000 human bones from an estimated 416 people. These bones were found in isolated, scattered graves across a ten square mile area. There were no indications of formal funerary services as evidenced by the lack of grave goods. Excavations at the Stillwater Marsh site were begun by the Nevada State Museum in 1985 and 1986, then continued by the Human Skeletal Field Survey team, a group of archaeologists that conducted the majority of research on the Stillwater Marsh skeletal remains, in 1987. Over 140 of the skeletons were deemed to be “relatively complete,” while many of the others were characterized by as little as one piece of bone. The skeletons found in Stillwater Marsh were not representative of a single population, but instead from different groups of people who resided in the area over the course of about 3,000 years. Radiocarbon dates indicate that there could have been people living in the Marsh for as long as 2,500 years, with the earliest settlement possibly coming approximately 3,200 years ago.

The skeletal remains suitable for analysis displayed a range of health conditions. Some were found without any pathological issues that would indicate health problems. Others, however, had characteristics indicative of a difficult lifestyle.

From Site 26Ch1046, one of the scattered burial pits found within the Stillwater Marsh locality, the skeletons of two young males were analyzed. Their bones demonstrate the effects of poor nutrition, as evidenced by unusual depressions at muscle attachment sites. One of the skeletons showed signs of anemia, as denoted by the presence of cribra orbitalia, which could have developed as a result of a nutrient-poor diet. Further evidence of cribra orbitalia was found by the Human Skeletal Field Survey in the summer of 1987. A juvenile skeleton was excavated that displayed anemia in this same pattern. While not exactly a sample of the population, these three young skeletons seem to indicate that appropriate nutrition may not have always been available for children, whose immune systems were still developing, leaving them more susceptible to infection.

One of the most notable characteristics found in the Stillwater Marsh skeletal series is the occurrence of osteoarthritis. Osteoarthritis is characterized by pitting on joint surfaces and bony outgrowths around the outer surfaces of joints. Of the approximately 67 cases of osteoarthritis found in the remains, a multitude of those cases had the disorder to the point of eburnation. The amount of effort required to remove the soft tissues in joints, leaving just bone-to-bone contact, such as in the hips or knees, is immense. Osteoarthritis that extreme indicated a highly mobile lifestyle. With the exception of the amount of osteoarthritis represented in the skeletal remains, the Stillwater Marsh people fit the definition of a hunter-gatherer society; the males ventured away from camping sites to hunt game, while the females remained close to the campsites gathering nuts, plants, and other foodstuffs It is evident, though, from the bones that they had to work more to meet their nutritional requirements than many other hunter-gatherer societies.

Evidence from the skeletal remains shows that the majority of joints were affected by eburnation, including the jaw, ankles, wrists, and elbows, in addition to the hips and knees. There are a few ways for eburnation to occur: the continual movement of those joints, ingestion of a specific fungus that consumes cartilage or a combination of the two. The presence of bone in the joints is another way in which osteoarthritis presents itself. In the case of the Stillwater Marsh people, it seems more likely that continual movement of the joints, making bone come through the tissue layers, is the cause of their osteoarthritis.

The most common joint affected by the disorder was the lumbar vertebrae of both males and females. There was extensive damage, when compared to the other joint surfaces on the skeletal remains, to the lumbar vertebrae. This damage indicates that there was lifting and heavy work being conducted by the Stillwater Marsh people. Females, however, had a higher frequency of osteoarthritis in their lumbar vertebrae than males did. This was the only measurement of osteoarthritis in which females exceeded males. Males had extensive osteoarthritis from their ankles up through to their shoulders. The majority of joint damage was bilateral in males and suggestive of travel with heavy loads up from and down to the Marsh. While this cannot be necessarily proven, the amount of osteoarthritis in the Stillwater Marsh population was so much greater than that of surrounding low-level populations that it appears to be a logical argument. Age was also a factor in demonstrating the extent of this disorder. Despite the longer life span of females, osteoarthritis still affected males more frequently.

A study done by Clark Spencer Larsen and Christopher B. Ruff on bones collected by the Nevada State Museum provides support for age and nutritional deficiencies as factors for osteoarthritis. The selected long bones included in this study were shown to have an immense amount of strength, which was required for the amount of heavy work they conducted. However, skeletons that were 40 years or older at the time of their death show a surprising lack of replacement to damaged bone. Nutrition is believed to be the major cause of the amount of bone loss based on the relatively young age, when compared to other prehistoric populations, at time of death of most of the skeletons.

An additional feature found on the teeth of the Stillwater Marsh people were hypoplasias, disturbances in the normal formation of enamel caused by nutritional and environmental stresses on the body. The appearance of these defects is most prominent at the labial and buccal surfaces after extended utilization of the occlusal surface wears down the teeth. After a study was conducted by Dale L. Hutchinson and Clark Spencer Larsen using teeth from approximately 40 of the skeletal remains collected by the Nevada State Museum and the Human Skeletal Field Survey, it was found that hypoplasia was not as common in the Stillwater Marsh populations as in other prehistoric populations. This is a positive signal that there was slightly better nutritional options available for the people of Stillwater Marsh, but their diet clearly did not meet all of their nutritional needs as hypoplasia was still notable on teeth.

The teeth of the Stillwater Marsh people also incurred a great deal of wear. After consuming seeds, using their teeth as tools, and chewing some stone and sand with meals for so long, the teeth of the skeletons that were older than 50 at the time of death were worn down to the roots. The amount of gritty material that clung to the gums led to periodontal disease in many of the Marsh people's jaws. Despite the other issues concerning the teeth and jaws of the Stillwater Marsh people, their teeth did not decay, as sugar was not part of their diet.

The skeletal remains of the people who once inhabited the Stillwater Marsh region tell us they worked very hard for their subsistence.

== Subsistence ==
Nutrition played a large role in determining the skeletal health of the Stillwater Marsh people. The number of human remains found suggests that the Marsh was one of the more populous regions in the Great Basin, indicating that the people living there has to become adept at using all of the natural food resources at their disposal. One of the major food sources in the Great Basin was the pine nut. There is no evidence of the Stillwater Marsh people consuming pine nuts, however. Pine nuts did not even appear in the Marsh area until a little over 1000 years ago.

Paleoethnobotanical samples from the Stillwater Marsh site show that seeds were a major part of these prehistoric peoples’ lives. Some of the more common seeds discovered were bulrush, cattail, and pickleweed, to name a few. Bulrush, however, was the most abundant seed found at the site. It is believed that, like other Native Americans, the Stillwater Marsh people utilized this seed as a source of nutrition. Based on the skeletal remains and knowledge of how hunter-gatherer societies functioned, females were most likely the ones that gathered these seeds for their families and communities. Additionally, some of these plants, mainly bulrush and cattail, are still in the Stillwater Marsh area. This seemingly indicates that they provided a continual food source for when people lived in the Marsh, as opposed to when they moved into the uplands for part of the year.

In addition to plant species, the area also had numerous sources of animals for food. Migratory birds played a major role in the lives of the Marsh people. Nets were the primary method utilized to capture the birds. Some of the more common birds in the area were mallard ducks and coots. The birds not only served as a source of food, but also as a means of some basic human comforts. The feathers and skins of these birds were utilized in the creation of clothing for the Stillwater Marsh people.

Another animal that played a pivotal role in the diet of the Marsh people was fish. The main fish species that they relied on was the tui chub, a type of minnow. The people used smaller tui chubs as a food source, as evidenced by the amount of skeletal remains of the fish found throughout the locality's sites.

Small mammals, mainly rodents, provided nutrition for the Stillwater Marsh people when fish, like the tui chub, and birds were out of season. Rodents, such as the ground squirrel, were cooked whole, whereas small mammals, like the muskrat, had the fur removed before cooking.

== Conclusion ==
There are still some unanswered questions about the people who lived at the Stillwater Marsh, such as why males had such severe osteoarthritis. Additional research needs to be conducted as to where the people of the Stillwater Marsh went after use at the burial area was discontinued.

The skeletons that were analyzed from Stillwater Marsh were reinterred on land owned by the U.S. Fish and Wildlife Service. They are under protection by the Fallon Paiute-Shoshone Tribe.
