= Santa Barbara Nutrients =

American health technology company

Santa Barbara Nutrients, Inc.
- Type: Private
- Industry: Health technology
- Founded: 2020; 6 years ago
- Founder: Thomas Weimbs and Jacob Torres
- Headquarters: Santa Barbara, California, United States
- Area served: Worldwide
- Key people: Thomas Weimbs (President and CSO)
- Products: KetoCitra
- Services: Ren-Nu program
- Number of employees: 18 (2026)
- Website: santabarbaranutrients.com

Santa Barbara Nutrients, Inc. is an American medical food company headquartered in Santa Barbara, California. The company develops medical foods and dietary programs intended for the dietary management of autosomal dominant polycystic kidney disease (ADPKD) and other renal and metabolic conditions.

== History ==
Santa Barbara Nutrients was established in 2019 as a spin-off from the University of California, Santa Barbara (UCSB). It was founded by UCSB researchers Thomas Weimbs and Jacob Torres to commercialize technology and patents licensed through the university's technology transfer program. The foundational research, initially funded by the National Institutes of Health (NIH), investigated the metabolic pathways of polycystic kidney disease in animal models, specifically focusing on the effects of the keton beta-hydroxybutyrate (BHB) and citrate. Research by the founders reported that BHB and citrate act synergistically in combination.

== Products and services ==
In November 2021, the company launched KetoCitra, a non-prescription product classified under U.S. regulations as a medical food to be used under medical supervision. The product is formulated with BHB, an alkaline citrate base, potassium, calcium, and magnesium. According to the company, the formulation is intended to support a ketogenic diet by addressing the metabolic glucose dependence of ADPKD cysts and reducing the dietary absorption of renal stressors such as oxalates and inorganic phosphates. The ingredients are generally recognized as safe (GRAS), and the product is formulated without sugar or sodium.

In early 2022, Santa Barbara Nutrients introduced Ren-Nu, a telehealth nutrition program. The program guides patients in implementing a kidney-safe ketogenic diet alongside KetoCitra supplementation.

In a 2024 Forbes article on the emerging "food as medicine" field, physician Bruce Y. Lee discussed KetoCitra as an example of a medical food developed from academic research, tracing its origins to Weimbs's studies showing that ketosis slowed cyst growth in rodent models of polycystic kidney disease. He presented medical foods as a possible route to new treatment options for conditions that receive comparatively little attention from pharmaceutical companies. Weimbs told Lee that because medical foods consist of ingredients generally recognized as safe and follow a different regulatory pathway from drugs, without equivalent clinical-trial requirements, they can be brought to market at roughly one-hundredth of the cost of a new drug.

== Research and clinical trials ==
The development of Santa Barbara Nutrients' products is based on the founders' primary research suggesting that ketogenic interventions can affect renal cyst growth. In 2023, the University of Cologne in Germany, in collaboration with Weimbs, conducted the KETO-ADPKD trial, the first randomized controlled trial investigating ketogenic metabolic therapy for ADPKD. The study concluded that the intervention was feasible and reported statistically significant improvements in kidney function, as measured by estimated glomerular filtration rate (eGFR), along with a decrease in total kidney volume compared to the control group.

The company's dietary programs have subsequently been evaluated in several international clinical trials. In February 2026, the Cleveland Clinic initiated a prospective clinical trial to evaluate the safety, tolerability, and metabolic outcomes of the Ren-Nu program and KetoCitra. Similar studies are underway at the Juntendo University in Tokyo and the Royal Melbourne Hospital, run in partnership with SBN and the Kidney Nutrition Institute. Expanding beyond renal conditions, the Keck School of Medicine at the University of Southern California has included KetoCitra in a clinical trial assessing the impacts of dietary interventions on long-COVID patients.

A 2026 retrospective case series published in Frontiers in Nutrition analyzed 103 individuals with ADPKD who participated in the Ren-Nu ketogenic regimen. nutritional program with KetoCitra ketogenic regimen. The study reported a significant within-subject increase in eGFR (as a measure of kidney function) and high dietary adherence among participants, along with improvements in body mass index (BMI) and blood pressure, and self-reported reductions in kidney pain and migraine headaches. A 2026 case report described four self-referred individuals who used KetoCitra alongside dietary changes for between six months and about four years, reporting stabilisation or reduction of kidney volume.

Systematic reviews published in 2025 and 2026 found that ketogenic diets were feasible and associated with weight loss in people with ADPKD, but that the studies were small and short, effects on kidney volume were inconsistent, and longer controlled trials were needed before such interventions could be recommended.

== Corporate affairs ==
Santa Barbara Nutrients operates as a public benefit corporation incorporated in Delaware. In March 2021, prior to the launch of its first commercial products, the company raised approximately $1.2 million in seed funding.
