= Anders Björklund =

Swedish neuroscientist (born 1945)

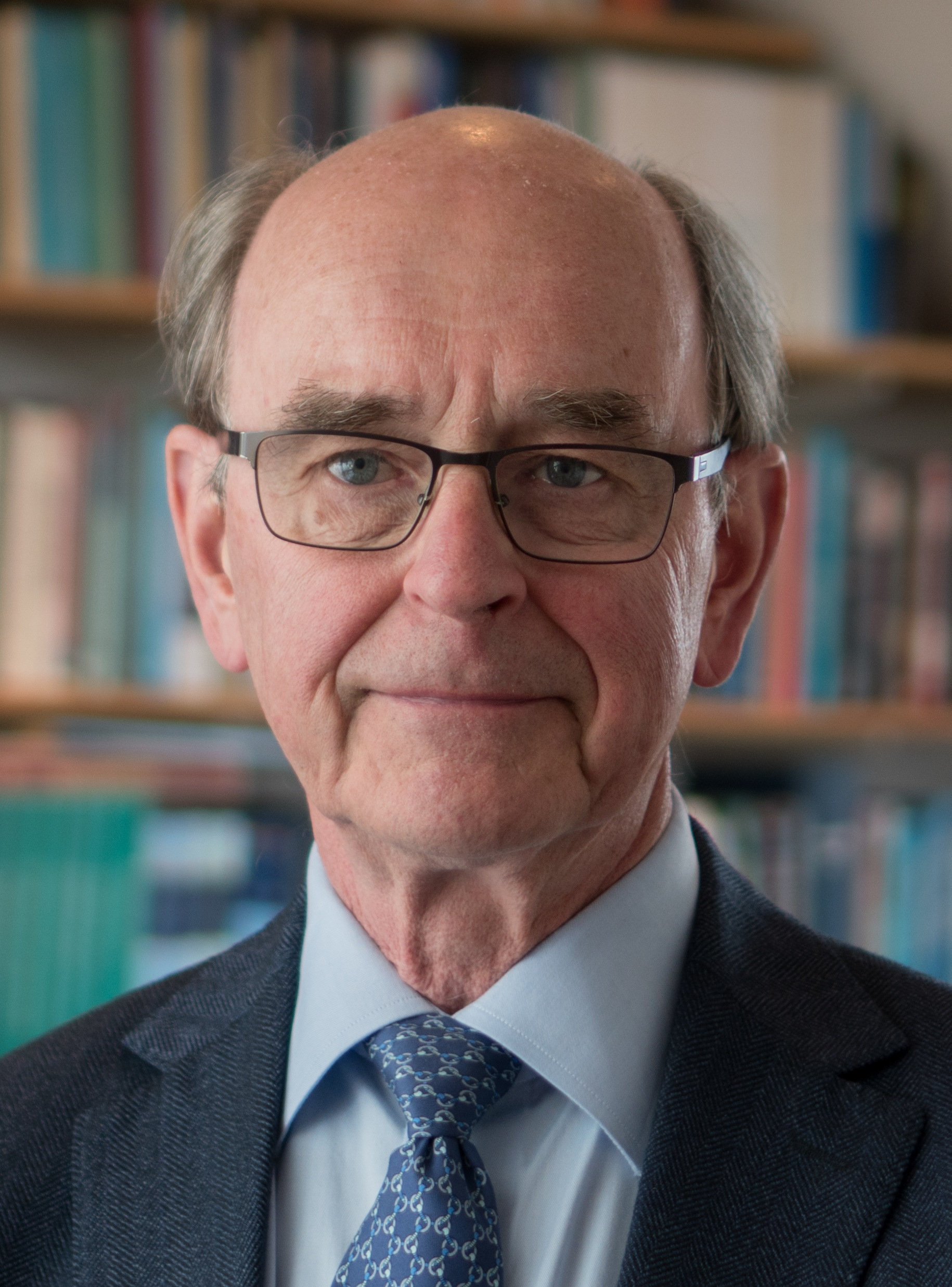
- Björklund in 2019
- Born: July 11, 1945 (age 81); Söderhamn, Sweden
- Education: Lund University, Sweden
- Known for: Pioneer in the study of cell- and gene-based reparative and neuroprotective mechanisms in the brain

Anders Björklund (born 11 July 1945) is a Swedish neuroscientist and pioneer in the study of cell- and gene-based reparative and neuroprotective mechanisms in the brain. He has spent his academic career at Lund University in Sweden, as professor since 1983 and as senior professor at the Wallenberg Neuroscience Center since his formal retirement in 2012.

In the 1980s, his team at Lund University pioneered the development of stem cell-based therapies for brain repair, and his group has for more than four decades played a leading role in the development and use of dopamine cell replacement in patients with Parkinson's disease

Björklund was elected member of the Royal Swedish Academy of Sciences in 1989, and Foreign Member of the National Academy of Sciences, USA, in 2011.

== Career ==
Björklund started as a research student in the laboratory of Bengt Falck, the co-inventor of the Falck-Hillarp histofluorescence method for the visualization of monoamine-containing neurons in the brain, and defended his doctoral thesis at Lund University, Sweden, in 1969. He was trained as a neuroanatomist and during his early postdoctoral years he carried out a series of detailed studies of the organization and projections of the monoaminergic systems in the brain, the dopaminergic projection systems in particular. In mid-1970s, Björklund´s interests turned to studies on brain regeneration and repair and in close collaboration with his student Ulf Stenevi he pioneered the development of methods for neural transplantation to the mammalian brain, based on the idea that immature neurons and neuroblasts, obtained from the fetal CNS, can be used to replace lost neurons, restore brain circuitry and promote functional recovery in animal models of neurodegenerative diseases.

Together with Stephen Dunnett and Rusty Gage, who had joined his lab as postdocs in the early 1980s, and two PhD students, Patrik Brundin and Ole Isacson, Björklund's group was first to report functional cell replacement in rodent models of Parkinson's and Huntington's disease, and in animal models of hippocampal damage and cognitive decline, using transplants of fetal neural tissue.

In 1986, the Lund team obtained permission to use tissue derived from aborted human fetuses in a series of open-label clinical trials in patients with Parkinson's disease. These trials, led by hid former student Olle Lindvall, provided proof-of-principle that immature dopamine neurons can survive and mature in the striatum in advanced Parkinson patients, and restore dopamine neurotransmission in the area of the striatum re-innervated by the grafted neurons. Although the clinical outcome has been highly variable, the results in some of the grafted patients have been sufficiently impressive to encourage further development of this approach

Current efforts, led by Björklund's long-time collaborators Malin Parmar and Agnete Kirkeby and carried out in collaboration with the neurologist Roger Barker at Cambridge University, are focused on the development of transplantable dopamine neurons, derived from human embryonic stam cells, for clinical application with regard to Parkinson's disease

A second major research line in Björklund's lab is focused on the use of neurotrophic factors, nerve growth factor (NGF) and glial cell line-derived neurotrophic factor GDNF in particular, for neuroprotection and repair. His lab has been involved in the exploration of recombinant adeno-associated virus (rAAV) vectors for neurotrophic factor and enzyme delivery to the brain, as well as the use of rAAV vectors for overexpression of human alpha-synuclein for modeling Parkinson-like neuropathology in rodents and monkeys.

In 2013, Björklund received the ECNP Neuropsychopharmacology Award.
