= Henri Dorra =

American art historian and educator

- Born: January 17, 1924; Alexandria, Egypt
- Died: June 14, 2002 (aged 78); Santa Barbara, California, United States
- Occupations: Art historian professor
- Parent(s): Clement Dorra; Aimee Castro
- Awards: Bowdoin Prizes (1949); Guggenheim Fellowship (1978)

Academic background
- Education: University of London; Harvard University
- Thesis: The Style of Paul Gauguin from 1871 to 1891 (1954)

Academic work
- Discipline: Art history
- Sub-discipline: Symbolism in French art
- Institutions: Corcoran Gallery of Art; Philadelphia Museum of Art; Indiana University–Purdue University; University of California, Los Angeles; University of California, Santa Barbara
- Influenced: Gabriel P. Weisberg

Henri Dorra (January 17, 1924 – June 14, 2002) was an Egyptian-American art historian and educator. A specialist on Symbolism in French art, Dorra was Professor Emeritus of Art History at the University of California, Santa Barbara.

== Career ==
Dorra was born in Alexandria, Egypt to Clement Dorra and Aimee Castro. In 1944, Dorra graduated from the University of London with a Bachelor of Science in Engineering. He then moved to the United States in 1947 to attend Harvard University, where he received the Bowdoin Prizes two years later. There, Dorra earned his Master of Arts in Engineering in 1950 and his Doctor of Philosophy in Art History in 1954. His doctoral dissertation was on the noted artist Paul Gauguin.

Upon graduation, Dorra began his curatorial career as Assistant Director of the Corcoran Gallery of Art in 1954. Seven years later, he was hired in the same role by the Philadelphia Museum of Art, where he remained for one year under Henri Gabriel Marceau.

In 1962, Dorra entered the world of academia as the Executive Vice President of the Herron School of Art and Design at the Indiana University–Purdue University. A year later, he became a faculty member at the University of California, Los Angeles. In 1965, Dorra was named Professor at the University of California, Santa Barbara, where he remained for the rest of his career. In 1978, he received a Guggenheim Fellowship in Fine Arts. A specialist on Symbolism in French art, Dorra retired in 1994 and was honored as Professor Emeritus. Throughout his career, he continued to study the works of Gauguin, as well as other artists of the period such as Georges Seurat.

== See also ==
- List of Guggenheim Fellowships awarded in 1978
- List of Harvard University people
- List of people associated with the University of London
- List of University of California, Santa Barbara faculty
