= Essentials of Glycobiology =

Graduate-level textbook

Essentials of Glycobiology is a graduate-level textbook and reference work in the field of glycobiology. It is published by the Cold Spring Harbor Laboratory Press, New York, and available as an open-access textbook at the National Center for Biotechnology Information (NCBI) Bookshelf collection. The book covers the structure, biosynthesis, and biological functions of glycans (sugar chains) and glycoconjugates.

The work is edited by a consortium of notable researchers working in glycobiology, with hematologist and oncologist Ajit Varki serving as lead editor alongside colleagues including Jeffrey Esko, who along with Varki helped to establish the Glycobiology Research and Training Center at UC San Diego School of Medicine. The text is highly collaborative, with over 90 additional co-authors contributing sections or chapters from their personal areas of expertise.

It has been widely cited in biomedical and biochemical research, and was the first textbook whose citations were included in PubMed when the repository began including textbook citations in 2010.

== Editions ==
=== First Edition (1999) ===
First published in 1999, the textbook describes the general principles of carbohydrate biochemistry; structural diversity of glycans (N-linked, O-linked, glycosaminoglycans, glycolipids, etc.); glycosylation pathways, biosynthetic enzymes and related metabolic pathways; lectins and glycan-binding proteins that bind diverse glycoconjugates; roles of glycans in genetic disorders, cancer and pathogen-related diseases; basic analytical techniques in glycobiology; and applications in biotechnology and medicine. This edition initiated the usage of black and white symbols to depict monosaccharides based on earlier representation proposed by Kornfeld and colleagues.

=== Second Edition (2009) ===
The second edition of Essentials was released in 2009, both in print and at the NCBI Bookshelf simultaneously. Besides an expanded editorial board and co-author list, several new chapters were added considering new advances and more expanded view of the glycosciences. Notable additions include sections describing glycan diversity in organisms (bacteria, fungi, plants etc.), advances in understanding of disease states and therapeutic applications, and the genomic view of glycobiology. At the start of the omics era, "Glycomics", analogous to genomics and proteomics, was beginning to provide a systematic view of glycan structures paving the way systems biology investigations. Also, introduced in this edition was the use of colors to depict glycan monosaccharides and carbohydrate structures.

=== Third Edition (2015) ===
The third edition of Essentials featured an expanded international editorial board representing a wider range of expertise, and range of contributing authors. New topics covered in this edition include a broader focus on glycan evolution in all lineages of life; a wider coverage of topics related to glycosylation engineering, nanotechnology, material science and biotechnology; and greater attention to informatics, mass spectrometry and integration with databases world-wide. Significantly, the new text greatly expanded monosaccharide symbols usage to depict carbohydrate structures across life. This usage of complex carbohydrates is now called the Symbol Nomenclature For Glycans (SNFG), and it continues to be expanded in parallel with advances in the book. This standard is now available as a living page at the NCBI. It is widely adopted by journals and web-repositories to simplify the unambiguous communication of glycobiology knowledge.

=== Fourth Edition (2022) ===
Like the 2^{nd} and 3^{rd} editions, the 4^{th} edition also featured a dual-format release of the updated textbook through collaboration between the editors of the Essentials text, Cold Spring Harbor Press, and NCBI Bookshelf. Major updates were made in this edition to cover glycan bioactivity, evolutionary dynamics, informatics advances, technological methods to measure glycans, genetic disorders of glycosylation etc. The authors and editorial board also included an expanded pool of contributors consistent with the global growth of this field.

== Reception ==
10 Nobel laureates, with awards spanning from 1974 to 2013, have offered praise of the textbook across its four editions.

In 2024, the editors of the Essentials of Glycobiology received the Distinguished Service Award from the Society for Glycobiology. The Society describes the book as "an invaluable resource for capturing and communicating knowledge in glycobiology". The textbook is cited in numerous scientific publications.

== Open-access model ==
During the development of the first edition of the text in the late 1990s, Varki was serving as the editor in chief of the Journal of Clinical Investigation, and had successfully advocated to the American Society for Clinical Investigation to host the journal freely on the nascent internet. It was the first time a scientific journal was presented in an open-access format, and the term would not come into common usage until more than a decade later. The development was lauded by scientists and medical practictioners, and Varki presented a similar model to David J. Lipman, then-director of the National Center for Biotechnology Information (NCBI), who agreed. The textbook was then hosted online as one of the earliest additions to the open-access NCBI Bookshelf. This was in part supported by a long-term project grant from the National Heart, Lung, and Blood Institute.
