= Jenny Hsieh =

American cell biologist

- Education: Johns Hopkins University (PhD)
- Scientific career
- Fields: Cell biology
- Workplaces: University of Texas at San Antonio
- Website: Hsieh Lab

Jenny Hsieh is an American cell biologist and Semmes Foundation professor at the University of Texas at San Antonio (UTSA). Her work focuses on epilepsy and stem cell biology.

== Education ==
Hsieh received her PhD from Johns Hopkins University, where she worked with Andrew Fire. In 2005, Hsieh completed a postdoctoral fellowship with Fred Gage at the Salk Institute.

== Career ==
Hsieh was a professor at the University of Texas Southwestern Medical Center from 2006 to 2018, when she moved to the University of Texas at San Antonio (UTSA). At UTSA, Hsieh holds the Semmes Foundation Chair in Cell Biology, and is the founding director of the UTSA Brain Health Consortium, a program to connect brain researchers across disciplines.

Hsieh's research focuses on the use of induced pluripotent stem cells to create in vitro models of neurogenesis. She intends to use this to develop regenerative treatments for neurological disorders.

During the COVID-19 pandemic, Hsieh studied the potential for neural infection by SARS-CoV-2 using neural organoids. Her initial results, based on exposing neural organoids to the virus, suggested that infection of glia might be involved in neurological symptoms such as loss of taste or smell.
