= Margaret Schoeninger =

American anthropologist

Margaret J. Schoeninger is an American anthropologist. She is Professor Emerita of Anthropology at The University of California, San Diego, and previously a co-director of the Center for Academic Research and Training in Anthropology, a joint research program of UC San Diego and the Salk Institute for Biological Studies dedicated to human evolution. Her research is primarily focused on dietary behavior in the genus Homo during the Paleolithic, and its contribution to morphological changes across human evolution. She is considered a major figure in the development of stable isotope analysis of fossils.

== Early life and education ==
In 1970, Schoeninger received her B.A. degree in anthropology from the University of Florida, and her M.A. degree in anthropology from the University of Cincinnati in 1973. She then received her Ph.D. in anthropology from the University of Michigan in 1980.

== Contributions to anthropology ==
Schoeninger is mainly interested in the changes that the human diet underwent through time and how diet has evolved in relation to other evolutionary changes. She researches this by looking at subsistence strategies and their anthropological connections. Schoeninger has published upwards of 60 research papers that investigate the isotopic ratios of various elements such as carbon, nitrogen, oxygen, and zinc in extinct primate dentition in order to reconstruct prehistoric human diet. Schoeninger has completed field research in North and Central America, Pakistan, India, Kenya, and Tanzania.

== Awards and honors ==
In 1990, Schoeninger was a Smithsonian Short Term Visitor in the Conservation Analytical Laboratory. In 1993 she was awarded the Faculty Development Award from the University of Wisconsin, and the following school year she was in the Vilas Associate Professorship at the same university. From 1997 to 1999, Schoeninger was recognized as a Distinguished Lecturer by the scientific research honor society Sigma Xi. In 2007, Schoeninger was elected Fellow of the American Association for the Advancement of Science.

== Selected publications ==
- Jaouen, Klevia, Beasley, Melanie, Schoeninger, Margaret J, Hublin, Jean- Jacques, Richards, Michael P, “Zinc isotope ratios of bones and teeth as new dietary indicators: results from a modern food web (Koobi Fora, Kenya)”. Scientific Reports 6:26281, DOI: 10:103/srep 26281. 2016. http://doi.org/10.1038/srep26281
- Somerville, AD, Martin, MA, Walker, P, Hayes, L, and Schoeninger, MJ “Exploring patterns and pathways of dietary change: Preferred foods, dental health, and stable isotope analysis of hair from the Dani of Mulia, Papua, Indonesia”. Current Anthropology DOI: 58(1):31-56. 2017. https://www.journals.uchicago.edu/doi/full/10.1086/690142?mobileUi=0
- Schoeninger, MJ “Diet reconstruction and ecology using stable isotopes”. In: Larsen, C.S. (ed.) A Companion Volume to Biological Anthropology. Wiley-Blackwell. Chap. 25:445-464. 2010. https://onlinelibrary.wiley.com/doi/abs/10.1002/9781444320039.ch25
- Schoeninger MJ. “Dietary reconstruction in the prehistoric Carson Desert: stable carbon and nitrogen isotopic analysis”. In: Larsen CS and Kelly RL (eds.) Bioarchaeology Of The Stillwater Marsh: Prehistoric Human Adaptation In The Western Great Basin. American Museum Of Natural History, Anthropological Papers, Number 77, pp. 96–106. 1995. http://digitallibrary.amnh.org/handle/2246/260
- DeNiro MJ and Schoeninger MJ. “Stable carbon and nitrogen isotope ratios of bone collagen: Variations within individuals, between sexes, and within populations raised on monotonous diet”. Journal of Archaeological Science 10(3):199-203. 1983. http://doi.org/10.1016/0305-4403(85)90011-1
- Gingerich PD and Schoeninger MJ. “Patterns of tooth size variability in the dentition of Primates. American Journal of Physical Anthropology 51(3):457-465. 1979. https://onlinelibrary.wiley.com/doi/abs/10.1002/ajpa.1330510318
