= George Ashwell (controversialist) =

Anglican polemic controversialist

George Ashwell (1612 – 1694) was an Anglican polemic controversialist.

== Life ==
Ashwell was born in the parish of St. Martin Ludgate, 8 November 1612. He was the son of Robert Ashwell, of Harrow. He was a scholar of Wadham College, Oxford, 1627; graduated B.A. 4 Dec. 1632, M.A. 1635, and became fellow of his college. He was tutor in the family of Thomas Leigh, a nonconformist, but his own sympathies were of another sort. He was the friend of Peter Heylin, who wrote, at his suggestion, on 'Parliament's Power in Laws for Religion,' which was published in 1645. He was made B.D. on 23 June 1646, and became chaplain to Sir Anthony Cope, lord of the manor of Hanwell, Oxfordshire. On the death of Dr. Robert Harris, 1658, he succeeded him in the rectory of Hanwell, where he died on 8 Feb. 1693-4. Ashwell has a significant private library of works in English and Latin.

== Works ==
Ashwell published:

- Fides Apostolica, or a Discourse asserting the received authors and authority of the Apostles' Creed . . . with a double appendix, the first touching the Athanasian, the second touching the Nicene Creed, 1663 (this was attacked by Richard Baxter, in his Reformed Pastor, 1656, for which Baxter expresses regret in his Catholick Theologie, 1675).
- Gestus Eucharisticus, or a Discourse concerning the Gesture at the receiving of the Holy Eucharist, 1663 (dedicated to his patron, Sir A. Cope).
- De Socino et Socinianismo Dissertatio, 1680 (suggested by the wide diffusion of English translations of Socinian books, and paying tribute to Lelio and Fausto Sozzini).
- De Ecclesia Romana Dissertatio, 1688 (this and the foregoing were portions of a much larger work in manuscript, De Judice Controversiarum et Catholicæ Veritatis Regula; they were published at the suggestion of Gilbert Ironside, warden of Wadham College, Oxford).
- The History of Hai Eb'n Yockdan, an Indian Prince, or the Self-taught Philosopher, 1686, at the end of which is Theologia Ruris . . . or the book of Nature leading us by certain degrees to the knowledge and worship of the God of Nature. The Yockdan fiction was translated by Ashwell from Edward Pococke's Latin version from the Arabic of Abu Bakr ibn Al-Tufail; it supplied Robert Barclay with a proof of his doctrine of the Inner Light: the passage was withdrawn by the Society of Friends, 1779.

Ashwell left behind him in manuscript, An Answer to Plato Redivivus, a work by Henry Neville.
