= Patrik Brundin =

Swedish neuroscientist

- Born: Patrik Brundin; December 26, 1961 (age 64); Malmö, Sweden
- Occupation: Neuroscientist
- Known for: Research on Parkinson's disease (PD) and Huntington's disease

Patrik Brundin (born December 26, 1961, in Malmö, Sweden) is a neuroscientist known for his research on Parkinson's disease (PD) and Huntington's disease. He is currently a Distinguished Scientist and serving as Therapeutic Area Leader for Movement Disorders at F. Hoffmann-La Roche, Pharmaceutical Research and Early Development (pRED).

Brundin was educated at Lund University from 1980 to 1992, where he became a full professor in 2000. In 2012, he was appointed the Jay Van Andel Endowed Chair in Parkinson's Research at Van Andel Institute, Grand Rapids, Michigan. Before moving to F. Hoffmann-La Roche in 2022, Brundin held multiple roles at the institute such as the Deputy Chief Scientific Officer, the Director of the Center for Neurodegenerative Science and the Parkinson's Disease Center.

== Early life and education ==
Already at age 12, Brundin became interested in studying and finding a cure for PD, a passion influenced by his father's, Bertil Brundin, diagnosis in 1974. While born in Sweden, Brundin spent the majority of his early childhood in the UK, before the family's return to Sweden in 1975.

In 1978, Brundin was granted a scholarship to United World College (UWC) of the Atlantic, an international boarding school in Wales, UK. At age 17, he started his research with an Extended Essay on PD as part of the International Baccalaureate (IB) program. Upon completion of his IB diploma in 1980, he entered medical school at Lund University in Sweden and embarked on an M.D.-Ph.D. program. He completed his Bachelor of Science in Medicine in 1983, a Ph.D. in 1988 under the supervision of Swedish neuroscientist Anders Björklund, and an M.D. in 1992.

== Career ==
In 1994, Brundin started his own independent research group at Lund University, Sweden, and he was promoted to full professor of neuroscience at the Faculty of Medicine in 2000. His team moved to the Wallenberg Neuroscience Center at Lund University in 1996.

In 2011, Brundin was awarded a European Research Council grant to study disease mechanisms in PD. In 2012, he moved to the USA and joined the Van Andel Institute, serving both as the Director of the Center for Neurodegenerative Science and the Head of the Laboratory for Translational Parkinson's Disease Research. He later held positions as the Deputy Chief Scientific Officer and the Director of the Parkinson's Disease Center at the same institute until 2022. During this period, he also chaired the scientific committee of the International Linked Clinical Trials initiative. In 2022, he moved to F. Hoffmann-La Roche where he became a Distinguished Scientist where he has the role of Therapeutic Area Leader for Movement Disorders.

Brundin is highly cited, with more than four hundred publications on PD and Huntington's Diseases. He contributed to cell transplantation for PD, took part in initial successful clinical trials, and oversaw subsequent methodological refinements. His work expanded to include the molecular mechanisms of these diseases, co-authoring with Nobel laureate Aaron Ciechanover, a 2002 review on the potential role of impaired protein degradation in neurodegenerative disorders. He and collaborators identified the prion-like propagation of alpha-synuclein aggregates between neurons and developed corresponding animal models. This work contributed to the recognition of alpha-synuclein as a potential therapeutic target in PD. In 2021, Brundin was listed on the Clarivate Highly Cited Researchers List. Since 2022, at F. Hoffmann-La Roche, he has maintained his research focus on alpha-synuclein, participating in clinical trials studying this protein.

Brundin has also had several other scientific leadership roles. In 2011 he was a founding co-editor-in-chief of the Journal of Parkinson's Disease and he served in that role for over a decade. Starting in 2012, he served for a decade as the inaugural chair of the International Linked Clinical Trials committee, which was instrumental in conducting the largest drug repurposing program in Parkinson's Disease (PD). He has been a member of the World Parkinson Coalition Board of Directors and the MJ Fox Foundation Executive Scientific Advisory Board. He has also chaired a study section at the National Institutes for Neurological Disease and Stroke (NINDS). He is a scientific co-founder of the biotech companies Acousort AB and RYNE Biotechnology, the latter focused on induced pluripotent stem cell (iPSC)-based transplantation therapy for PD.

== Awards and recognition ==
- 1999: Dr Eric K Fernström Foundation's Prize to Young Swedish Scientists
- 2001: Catedra Santiago Grisolía Chair Prize, Valencia, Spain
- 2001: Chair, Gordon Research Conference on CAG Triplet Repeat Disorders
- 2003: Medal of Honour from the Swedish Parkinson Association
- 2003: Bernard Sanberg Memorial Award
- 2004: Elected as member of Academia Europea
- 2011: Swedbank Scientific Award in the Memory of Amanda and Per Algot Mångberg
- 2018: Aligning Science Across Parkinson's Planning Advisory Council
- 2019: Fulton Lecture Award, World Federation of Neurology
- 2021: Clarivate Highly Cited Researchers List
- 2022: Honorary Award for Outstanding Contribution, Tom Isaacs Award
