= Tania Israel =

American psychologist (born 1966)

Tania Israel Ph.D.
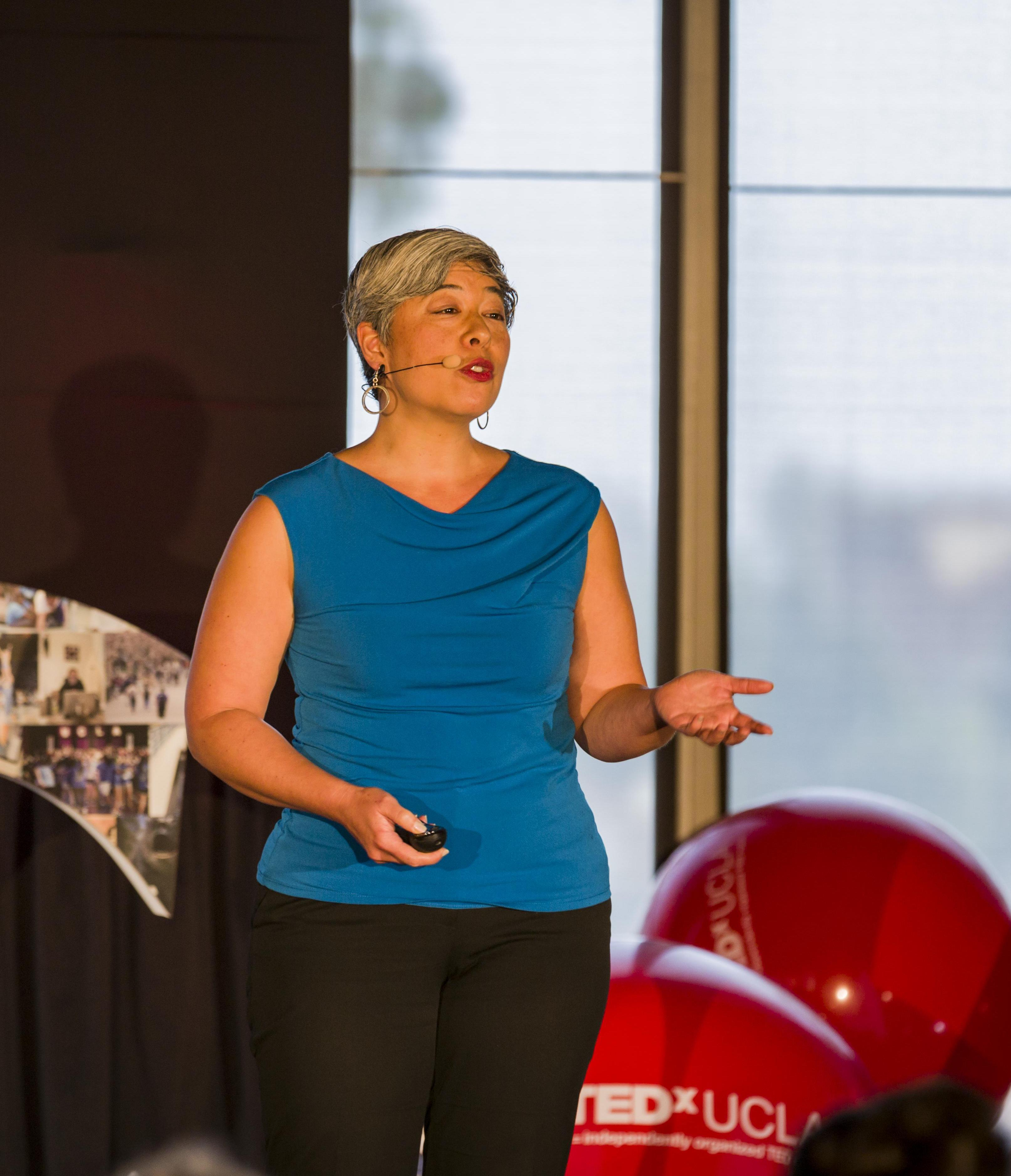
- Israel speaking at TEDxUCLA
- Born: 1966 (age 59–60); Pomona, California, U.S.
- Occupations: Psychologist, Professor, Researcher, Author

Academic background
- Education: Arizona State University (Ph.D) University of Pennsylvania (B.S., M.S.)

Academic work
- Institutions: University of California, Santa Barbara
- Website: taniaisrael.com

Tania Israel (born 1966) is an American psychologist and professor in the Gevirtz Graduate School of Education at the University of California, Santa Barbara (UCSB). Her research focuses on the development and implementation of interventions to support the mental health and well-being of LGBTQ individuals and communities. Israel has presented about dialogue across political lines and is the author of Beyond Your Bubble: How to Connect Across the Political Divide, Skills and Strategies for Conversations That Work (American Psychological Association, 2020) and Facing the Fracture: How to Navigate the Challenges of Living in a Divided Nation. She is also known for writing song lyrics, memoir, and bisexual haiku.

== Early life and education ==
Israel was born in Pomona, California to a Chinese-American mother and Jewish-American father, and she grew up in Charlottesville, Virginia. In 1988, she graduated from the University of Pennsylvania (Penn) with a double major in Psychology and Women's Studies after having been exposed to intersectional feminism by Michelle Fine.

After graduating, Israel worked at the Cherry Hill Women's Center in New Jersey and then oversaw AIDS education programs at the American Red Cross of Southeastern Pennsylvania. Israel returned to Penn and received a master's degree in Human Sexuality Education in 1992. She earned her Ph.D. in Counseling Psychology from Arizona State University in 1998, receiving awards for her dissertation on training counselors to work with LGB clients.

== Academic career ==
Israel has been a professor at the Gevirtz School's Department of Counseling, Clinical, and School Psychology (CCSP) since 2000 where she became the Associate Dean for Diversity, Equity and Inclusion in 2022. She is also an affiliated faculty member in UCSB's Department of Feminist Studies.

Israel is the director of Project RISE (Research & Interventions for Sexual and Gender Minority Empowerment). Projects include online interventions that help LGBTQ people persevere in the face of stigmas and effective LGBTQ-inclusive training for law enforcement and therapists. The local LGBTQ community research her team conducted in collaboration with Santa Barbara nonprofits resulted in a mandatory LGBTQ-focused training for City of Santa Barbara police officers. The training sessions fostered awareness and better understanding of LGBTQ needs and concerns and were found to improve LGBTQ community-police relations. In 2013, Israel testified at a U.S. Congressional briefing, speaking in support of expanding the Violence Against Women Act to include LGBTQ women's needs.

She is recognized as an expert on bisexuality, having participated in the inaugural White House Bisexual Community Policy Briefing in 2015, presented at the 2019 National Institutes of Health (NIH) Bisexual Health Research Workshop, and presented an invited plenary on bisexuality at the 2016 American Psychological Association Annual Convention. Israel's 2015 TEDxUCLA Talk, “Bisexuality and beyond,” has amassed over 100,000 views on YouTube as of May 2021.

Israel's book, Beyond Your Bubble: How to Connect Across the Political Divide, Skills and Strategies for Conversations That Work, grew out of a workshop that she provided to non-profit and faith organizations. She aims to help people articulate their thoughts about difficult issues and facilitate understanding between people from different political backgrounds. In her 2021, TEDx Talk “How to Win a Political Disagreement,” she asserted that “winning an argument is not about asserting one's position, but rather about strengthening a connection.” In her 2023, TEDxTalk “What Halibut Fajitas Taught Me About Bridging the Political Divide” she described biases that narrow our view and noted that “a single perspective is limiting.”

Israel's professional leadership includes President of the Society of Counseling Psychology, Lead Coordinator for the 2009 National Multicultural Conference and Summit, and member of the American Psychological Association Committee on Sexual Orientation and Gender Diversity.

== Awards and honors ==
- 2025 Award for Distinguished Senior Career Contributions to Psychology in the Public Interest from the American Psychological Association (APA)
- 2021 Next Generation Indy Book Awards Winner in Self Help and Finalist in General Non-Fiction (for Beyond Your Bubble)
- Order of the Pearl, Kappa Delta sorority (2021)
- Congressional Woman of the Year (2019)
- Shining Star from the National Multicultural Summit (2015)
- Asian and Pacific Islander Heritage Award of Excellence in Mental Health from the California Asian and Pacific Islander Legislative Caucus (2012)
- Emerging Leader for Women in Psychology from the APA's Committee on Women in Psychology (2012)
- Woman of the Year Award from the SCP Section for the Advancement of Women (2011)
- Early Career Award for Contribution to LGBT Psychology from the (SCP) Section for LGB Awareness (2008)
- Mentored Research Scientist Career Development Award (K01) from the National Institute of Mental Health (2003)

Israel is also a fellow in five divisions of the American Psychological Association, including the Society of Counseling Psychology (Division 17) and the Society for the Psychological Study of Sexual Orientation and Gender Diversity (Division 44).

== Political and community engagement ==
Israel was a 2008 Democratic National Convention delegate. Locally, she has served as a member of the Santa Barbara County Democratic Central Committee and the Grassroots Organizing Committee.

In her local community, she has been involved with the LGBT Community Collaborative of the Central Coast, the Fund for Santa Barbara Board (of which she was the president in 2013), the Lose Your Appetite for Hate Coalition, and the Santa Barbara County Commission for Women.

== Creative activities ==
Israel writes and performs personal memoir live and co-hosted podcast, Dr.Waffle & Friends. Two of her plays were selected for readings in Breakfast with Smartasses, part of Playfest Santa Barbara. She writes bisexual haiku (#biku).

Israel is a fan of Buffy the Vampire Slayer and credits the show as an inspiration. She is also a fan of the podcast Buffering the Vampire Slayer, for which she wrote and performed a tribute song.

She practices Buddhism and is co-hosted the podcast, Prajna Sparks, for which she wrote songs about Dharma teachings.

== Publications ==
=== Books ===
- Israel, T. (2024). Facing the Fracture: How to Navigate the Challenges of Living in a Divided Nation. Greenleaf Book Group.
- Israel, T. (2020). Beyond your bubble: How to connect across the political divide, skills and strategies for conversations that work. American Psychological Association Books.
- Toporek, R.L., Gerstein, L., Fouad, N., Roysircar, G., & Israel, T. (2005). Handbook for social justice in counseling psychology: Leadership, vision, and action. Sage Publications.
