= Fred Gage =

American geneticist

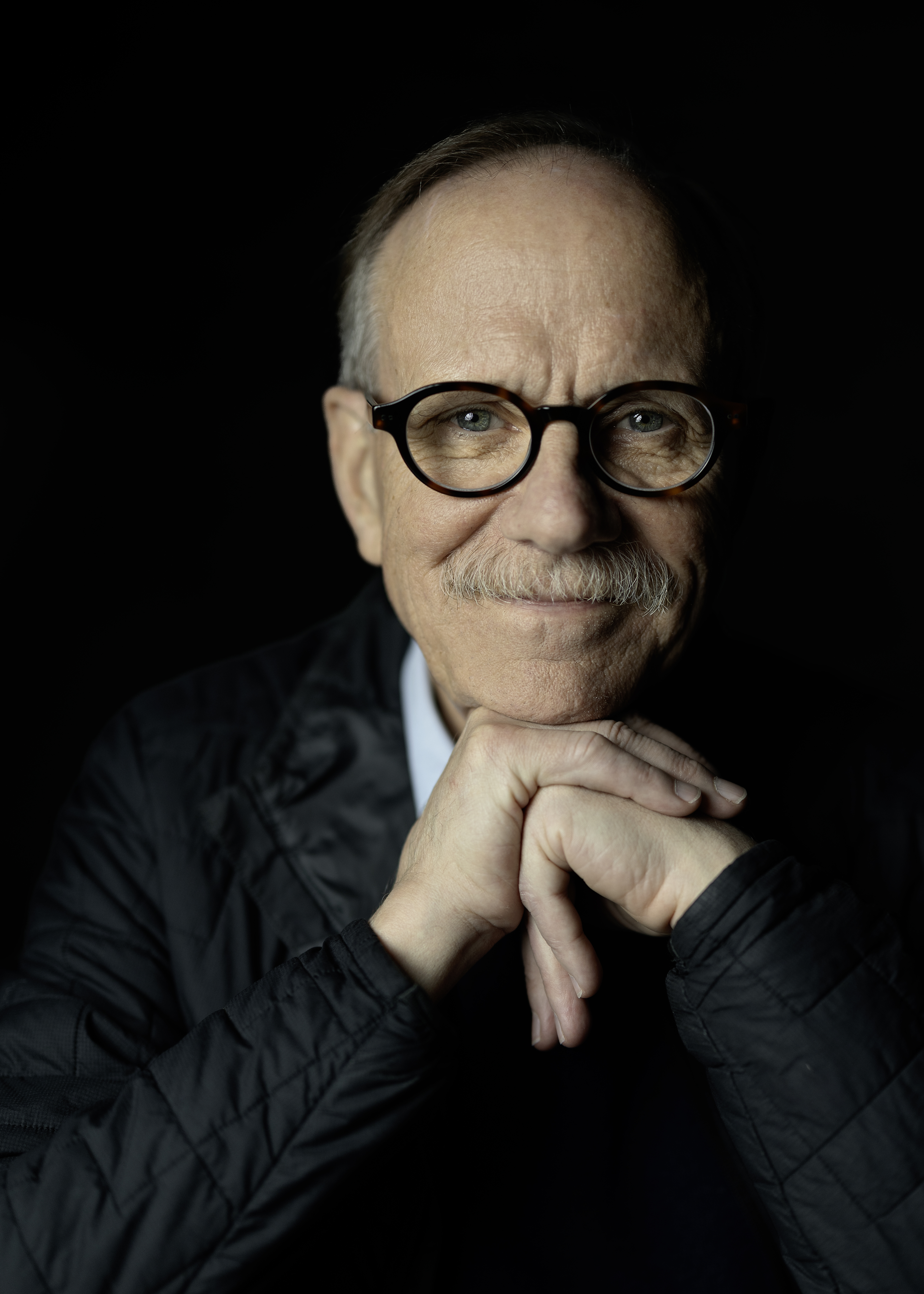
- Fred Gage in 2026
- Born: October 8, 1950 (age 75)
- Education: University of Florida; Johns Hopkins University
- Known for: Discovering stem cells in the human brain
- Spouse: Mary Lynn Gage
- Awards: Christopher Reeve Research Medal; Max Planck Research Prize
- Scientific career
- Fields: Neuroscience, genetics
- Workplaces: Salk Institute for Biological Studies; University of California, San Diego
- Notable students: Jenny Hsieh

Fred "Rusty" Gage (born October 8, 1950) is an American geneticist known for his discovery of stem cells in the adult human brain. Gage is a former president (2018–2023) of the Salk Institute for Biological Studies, where he holds the Vi and John Adler Chair for Research on Age-Related Neurodegenerative Disease and works in the Laboratory of Genetics.

Gage concentrates on the adult central nervous system and the unexpected plasticity and adaptability that remains throughout the life of all mammals. His work may lead to methods of replacing brain tissue lost to stroke or Alzheimer's disease and repairing spinal cords damaged by trauma.

== Biography ==
Gage was raised in Frankfurt, Germany, but spent time living in and visiting Italy throughout his upbringing. These experiences influenced his later decision to attend St. Stephen's School Rome for high school, which had been founded by a customer of his stockbroker father.

Gage speaks fondly of his time at St. Stephen's, where, amidst his studies, he met his future wife. Because he was living in the rich historic city of Rome, Gage remembers focusing on art history and humanities throughout high school. However, his sister was a scientist, and she encouraged him to consider the discipline by sending articles and books to Gage over the years.

Following his time in Rome, Gage had no intentions of returning to the United States—but his parents told him otherwise. He ended up choosing University of Florida for his undergraduate studies, since his sister and father had both attended the school. After a year in Florida, Gage was desperate to get back to Europe and he knew he needed to get a job to do so. He joined the University of Florida's research laboratory at the medical school and from then on dedicated his life to science.

== Education ==
Gage graduated from St. Stephen's School in Rome, Italy in 1968. After graduating from high school, Gage received his Bachelor of Science degree from the University of Florida, where he worked in the brain research laboratory. He then went on to receive his Ph.D. from Johns Hopkins University, where he continued to focus on neuroscience. In 1976, he had completed his Ph.D. and moved to Texas Christian University as associate director of the school's neuroscience program. In 1981, he left Texas Christian University to complete his postdoctoral research at Lund University in Sweden, under the direction of cell transplantation pioneer Anders Björklund. After completing his research, he remained at Lund University as an associate professor until 1985, when he moved back to the United States.

== Career and research ==
At the conclusion of his time at Lund University, Gage moved to San Diego, where he became a faculty member in the University of California, San Diego, neuroscience department. In 1995, he moved to the Salk Institute, where he still works.

In 1998, Gage (Salk Institute, La Jolla, California) and Peter Eriksson (Sahlgrenska University Hospital, Gothenburg, Sweden) discovered and announced that the human brain produces new nerve cells in adulthood. Until then, it had been assumed that humans are born with all the brain cells they will ever have. Gage's laboratory showed that, contrary to years of dogma, human beings are capable of growing new nerve cells throughout life.

Small populations of immature nerve cells are found in the adult mammalian brain, and Gage is working to understand how these cells can be induced to become mature nerve cells. His team is investigating how such cells can be transplanted back to the brain and spinal cord. They have shown that physical exercise can enhance the growth of new brain cells in the hippocampus, a brain structure that is important for the formation of new memories. Furthermore, his team is examining the underlying molecular mechanisms that are critical to the birth of new brain cells—work that may lead to new therapeutics for neurodegenerative conditions.

His laboratory studies the genomic mosaicism that exists in the brain as a result of "jumping genes", mobile elements, and DNA damage that occurs during development. Specifically, he is interested in how this mosaicism may lead to difference in brain function between individuals. His laboratory published work showing that human induced pluripotent stem cells (hiPSCs) erase aging signatures and hiPSC-derived neurons remain rejuvenated, while direct conversion into induced neurons (iNs) preserve donor fibroblast age-dependent transcriptomic signatures.

In October 2004, he participated in the XIIth Mind and Life Institute conference in Dharamsala, India, on the theme of neuroplasticity and spoke with the 14th Dalai Lama about his research demonstrating the generation of new nerve cells in the adult brain.

== Relationship with Phineas Gage ==
Fred Gage has been said to be a descendant of (or more specifically, the great-grandson of) Phineas Gage, through whose brain an iron bar 1 1/4-inches in diameter was accidentally driven in 1848, transforming him into perhaps the most famous of all brain-injury survivors. However, this proposition faces considerable difficulties, chief of which being that Phineas Gage had no known children.

== Awards and honors ==
- IPSEN Prize in Neuronal Plasticity, 1990
- Charles A. Dana Award for Pioneering Achievements in Health and Education, 1993
- Christopher Reeve Research Medal, 1997
- Max Planck Research Prize, 1999
- Metlife Foundation Award for Medical Research in Alzheimer's Disease, 2001
- President, Society for Neuroscience, 2001
- MetLife Award for Medical Research, 2002
- National Academy of Sciences Fellow, 2003
- The Max Planck Society/Gertrud Reemstma Foundation Klaus-Joachim Zülch Prize, 2003
- American Academy of Arts and Sciences Fellow, 2005
- Keio Medical Science Prize, 2008
- European Molecular Biology Organization Associate Member, 2009
- American Philosophical Society Member, 2010
- International Society for Stem Cell Research President, 2011-2012
- Cátedra Santiago Grisolia Award, 2011
- George A. Miller Prize in Cognitive Neuroscience, 2013
- Paul G. Allen Family Foundation Allen Distinguished Investigator Award, 2015
- Infosys Prize Jury Member, 2015
- JCN-Wiley W. Maxwell Cowan Award in Developmental Neuroscience, 2017
- ARCS Foundation Scientist of the Year, 2018
- Salk Institute for Biological Studies President, 2018-2023
- International Society for Stem Cell Research Achievement Award, 2020
