= Ann Bermingham =

American art historian

- Born: Ann Cathleen Bermingham; May 1948 (age 78); United States
- Occupations: Art historian educator

Academic background
- Education: Manhattanville College; University of Massachusetts, Amherst; Harvard University
- Thesis: The Ideology of Landscape: Gainsborough, Constable, and the English Rustic Tradition (1982)

Academic work
- Discipline: Art history
- Sub-discipline: Eighteenth- and nineteenth-century British art
- Institutions: University of California, Santa Barbara
- Influenced: Romita Ray

Ann Cathleen Bermingham (born May 1948) is an American art historian and educator. A specialist on eighteenth- and nineteenth-century British art, Bermingham is Professor of Art History Emeritus at the University of California, Santa Barbara.

== Career ==
Bermingham graduated from Manhattanville College, where she received a Bachelor of Arts in 1969. She then earned a Master of Arts from the University of Massachusetts, Amherst and a Doctor of Philosophy from Harvard University in 1982. Bermingham wrote a doctoral dissertation on English landscape painting, focusing especially on the artists John Constable and Thomas Gainsborough. She is a member of Phi Kappa Phi.

Bermingham has taught exclusively within the University of California system throughout her career, namely at Irvine, Los Angeles, Riverside, Santa Cruz, and Santa Barbara. She joined the latter in 1993, eventually becoming Professor of Art History Emeritus upon retirement.

== Selected works ==
- Landscape and Ideology: The English Rustic Tradition, 1740-1860, 1986 ISBN 0520052870
- The Consumption of Culture, 1600-1800: Image, Object, Text, 1995 ISBN 0415121353
- Learning to Draw: Studies in the Cultural History of a Polite and Useful Art, 2000 ISBN 978-0300080391
- Sensation and Sensibility: Viewing Gainsborough's Cottage Door, 2005 ISBN 978-0300110029

== See also ==
- List of Harvard University people
- List of University of California, Santa Barbara faculty
- List of University of Massachusetts Amherst alumni
