= St. Stephen's School Rome =

School in Rome, Italy

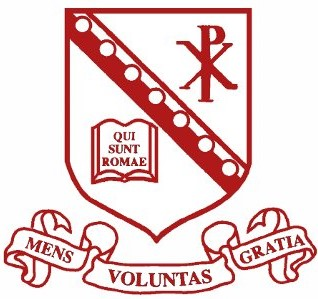
- St. Stephen's School Rome's logo

Location
- Via Aventina 3, 00153 Rome, Italy

Information
- Type: Boarding School, International School, Private School
- Motto: Mens Volutas Gratias (Mind Will Grace)
- Established: 1964; 62 years ago
- Head of school: Maria Nunes
- Staff: 67
- Grades: 9-12
- Enrollment: 250 (Approx. 50 boarding students)
- Education system: American High School Diploma, International Baccalaureate Diploma Program
- Campus size: 3 acres (1.2 ha)
- Colors: Crimson and White
- Website: sssrome.it

St. Stephen's School Rome (formerly known as St. Stephen's International School) is a private, international day and boarding school in the heart of Rome on the Aventine Hill near the Circus Maximus, Forum, and Colosseum. The school's motto is Mens Voluntas Gratia (lit. 'Mind, Will, Grace').

In 2024, Architectural Digest named the school one of the "World's 9 Most Beautiful Boarding Schools."

== Founding ==
St. Stephen's was founded in 1964 by Dr. John O. Patterson, the former Headmaster of the Kent School in Connecticut. Patterson and his team of educators selected Rome because of its rich history and proximity to some of the major moral, artistic, philosophical, and political antecedents of the Western world. Patterson intended for the school to be a haven where students from around the world could come to learn and grow together—a truly international setting. In 1975 it became the first school in Italy to adopt the International Baccalaureate.

== Student body ==
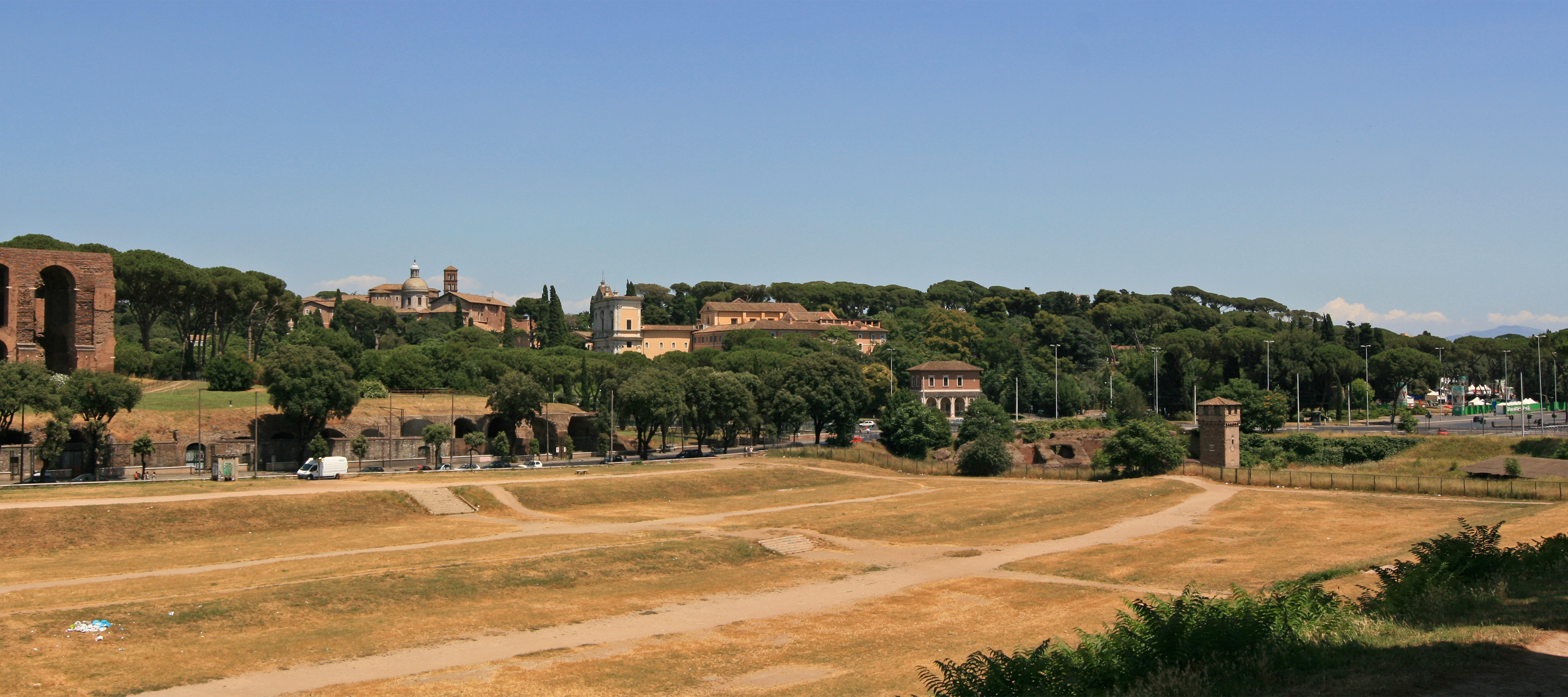
Aventine Hill, upon which the school is perched.

There are about 250 international day students who live with their families in Rome. Many of them have parents who work for the FAO and IFAD and other international organizations. The school is home to about 50 students, who board on campus for 8 months of the year. The boarding students come from around the world, and spend holidays and summers away from the school. A small number of boarders come from the United States to complete either a semester or year abroad.

== University matriculation ==
Among the most popular choices of St. Stephen's alumni are Columbia University, the University of Edinburgh, École polytechnique, and the University of Cambridge.
