= Thomas Weimbs =

German-American molecular biologist and academic

Professor Thomas Weimbs
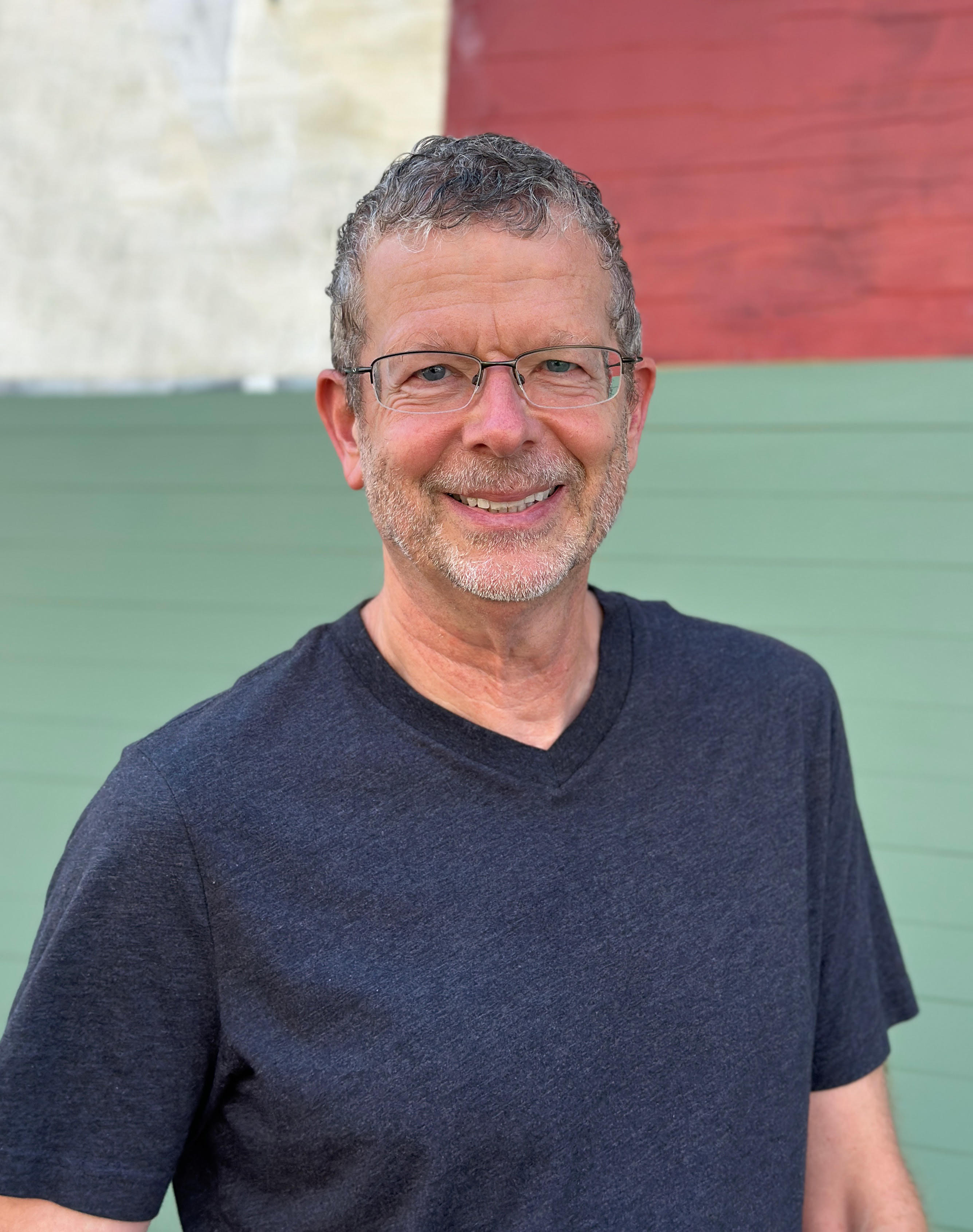
- Thomas Weimbs
- Born: Germany
- Education: University of Cologne
- Known for: Discoveries relating to Polycystic Kidney Disease mTOR pathway Ketogenic metabolic therapy
- Awards: Innovator Award, Cleveland Clinic (2006)
- Scientific career
- Fields: Molecular biology Cell biology Nephrology
- Workplaces: University of California, Santa Barbara, Cleveland Clinic, Case Western Reserve University
- Thesis: Funktionelle Lokalisation der Cystein-Reste und Untersuchungen zur Membran-Topologie des Myelin-Proteolipidproteins (1993)
- Doctoral advisor: Wilhelm Stoffel
- Other academic advisors: Keith E. Mostov
- Website: https://labs.mcdb.ucsb.edu/weimbs/thomas

Thomas Weimbs (born in Germany) is a German-American molecular biologist and cell biologist. He is a professor of Molecular, Cellular, and Developmental Biology at the University of California, Santa Barbara (UCSB) and the head of the Weimbs Laboratory.

== Career ==
Weimbs earned his Diplom Chemiker (MS) in 1990 and his Dr. rer. nat. (Ph.D.) in 1993 from the University of Cologne, Germany, researching the structure of the myelin proteolipid protein and its mutations in Pelizaeus-Merzbacher Disease. He subsequently conducted postdoctoral research at the Department of Anatomy, School of Medicine at the University of California, San Francisco (UCSF) from 1994 to 1999, studying the role of the SNARE membrane fusion machinery in polarized membrane trafficking in epithelial cells. In 1999, he became an Assistant Staff member at the Lerner Research Institute of the Cleveland Clinic. Concurrently, he served as an Assistant Professor in the Department of Molecular Medicine at the Cleveland Clinic Lerner College of Medicine of Case Western Reserve University from 2004 to 2005. Weimbs transitioned to the University of California, Santa Barbara (UCSB) in 2005 as an Assistant Professor in the Department of Molecular, Cellular, and Developmental Biology. He attained the rank of Associate Professor with tenure in 2007 and was appointed as a full Professor in 2014. In 2019, Weimbs founded Santa Barbara Nutrients, Inc., where he acts as the President and Chief Scientific Officer.

== Research ==
Initially Weimbs studied intracellular membrane trafficking, mapping the differential localization of SNARE proteins and syntaxin isoforms in polarized epithelial cells.

His research then transitioned to the underlying molecular mechanisms and potential treatments for polycystic kidney disease (PKD). His laboratory identified the abnormal activation of the mTOR and STAT signaling pathways in PKD, establishing parallels between cyst growth and normal renal injury repair processes. More recently, his research focuses on metabolic interventions to mitigate PKD progression. He demonstrated that inducing ketosis via a ketogenic diet, intermittent fasting, or administration of the ketone beta-hydroxybutyrate (BHB) can slow or partially reverse cyst growth in animal models. This research subsequently led to retrospective case studies and clinical trials indicating the feasibility and positive metabolic impact of ketogenic regimens for human PKD patients. Additionally, his lab discovered that microcrystal injury in kidney tubules triggers a conserved reno-protective response leading to tubule dilation that can worsen the progression of PKD, and that this can be prevented by citrate supplementation. Weimbs is the inventor on several patents on the use of the combination of BHB and citrate for the treatment or management of PKD and other kidney diseases.

In addition to dietary interventions, Weimbs investigates targeted immunotherapies, such as utilizing transcytosing dimeric IgA monoclonal antibodies to directly deliver therapeutics into epithelial-enclosed kidney cysts.

== Santa Barbara Nutrients ==
In 2019, Weimbs and Jacob Torres founded Santa Barbara Nutrients, Inc. to commercialise a combination of beta-hydroxybutyrate and citrate developed and patented at UCSB. In November 2021 the company launched KetoCitra, a medical food intended for the dietary management of polycystic kidney disease, together with Ren-Nu, a remotely delivered program developed with renal dietitians that teaches a plant-focused ketogenic diet used alongside KetoCitra.

== Distinctions ==
- 1994: Feodor Lynen Fellow, Alexander von Humboldt Foundation
- 2006: Innovator Award, Cleveland Clinic

== Selected works ==
- Shillingford, Jonathan M. (2006). "The mTOR pathway is regulated by polycystin-1, and its inhibition reverses renal cystogenesis in polycystic kidney disease". Proceedings of the National Academy of Sciences. 103 (14): 5466–5471. doi:10.1073/pnas.0509694103. PMC 1459378. PMID 16567633.
- Torres, Jacob A. (2019). "Ketosis Ameliorates Renal Cyst Growth in Polycystic Kidney Disease". Cell Metabolism. 30 (6): 1007–1023.e5. doi:10.1016/j.cmet.2019.09.012. PMC 6904245. PMID 31631001.
- Weimbs, Thomas (2007). "Polycystic kidney disease and renal injury repair: common pathways, fluid flow, and the function of polycystin-1". American Journal of Physiology. Renal Physiology. 293 (5): F1423–F1432. doi:10.1152/ajprenal.00275.2007. PMID 17715262.
- Torres, Jacob A.; Rezaei, Mina; Broderick, Caroline; Lin, Louis; Wang, Xiaofang; Hoppe, Bernd; Cowley, Benjamin D.; Savica, Vincenzo; Torres, Vicente E.; Khan, Saeed; Holmes, Ross P.; Mrug, Michal; Weimbs, Thomas (2019-10-01). "Crystal deposition triggers tubule dilation that accelerates cystogenesis in polycystic kidney disease". The Journal of Clinical Investigation. 129 (10): 4506–4522. doi:10.1172/JCI128503. ISSN 0021-9738. PMC 6763267. PMID 31361604.
- Cukoski, Sadrija; Lindemann, Christoph Heinrich; Arjune, Sita; Todorova, Polina; Brecht, Theresa; Kühn, Adrian; Oehm, Simon; Strubl, Sebastian; Becker, Ingrid; Kämmerer, Ulrike; Torres, Jacob Alexander; Meyer, Franziska; Schömig, Thomas; Hokamp, Nils Große; Siedek, Florian (November 2023). "Feasibility and impact of ketogenic dietary interventions in polycystic kidney disease: KETO-ADPKD—a randomized controlled trial". Cell Reports Medicine. 4 (11) 101283. doi:10.1016/j.xcrm.2023.101283. ISSN 2666-3791. PMC 10694658. PMID 37935200.
- Low, Seng Hui; Vasanth, Shivakumar; Larson, Claire H.; Mukherjee, Sambuddho; Sharma, Nikunj; Kinter, Michael T.; Kane, Michelle E.; Obara, Tomoko; Weimbs, Thomas (January 2006). "Polycystin-1, STAT6, and P100 Function in a Pathway that Transduces Ciliary Mechanosensation and Is Activated in Polycystic Kidney Disease". Developmental Cell. 10 (1): 57–69. doi:10.1016/j.devcel.2005.12.005. ISSN 1534-5807. PMID 16399078.
- Strubl, Sebastian (2021). "Ketogenic dietary interventions in autosomal dominant polycystic kidney disease—a retrospective case series study: first insights into feasibility, safety and effects". Clinical Kidney Journal. 15 (6): 1079–1092. doi:10.1093/ckj/sfab162. PMC 9155228. PMID 35664270.
