= Victor Nizet =

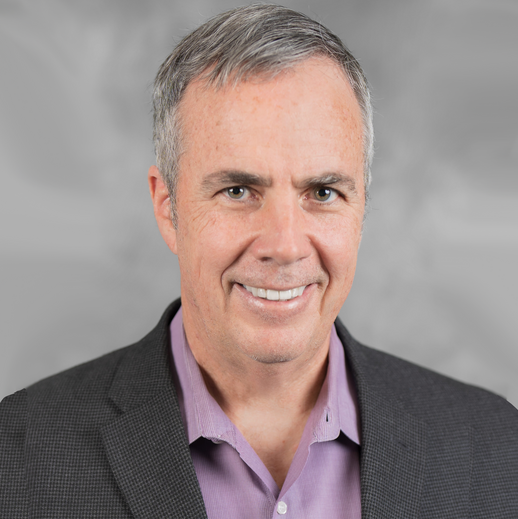
Victor Nizet, MD (UC San Diego)

Victor Nizet is an American physician-scientist and microbiologist. He is a distinguished professor and vice chair of basic research at the Department of Pediatrics at the University of California, San Diego (UCSD) School of Medicine. He is also a distinguished professor at UCSD Skaggs School of Pharmacy and Pharmaceutical Sciences in La Jolla, California. He is known for his research in the areas of molecular microbiology and the innate immune system, with a particular focus on infectious diseases caused by common gram-positive bacterial pathogens such as Group A Streptococcus, Group B Streptococcus and Staphylococcus aureus.

A native of Santa Barbara, California, Nizet received his undergraduate education at Reed College in Portland, Oregon, completed his MD degree at Stanford University School of Medicine, a residency and chief residency in pediatrics at Harvard University/Boston Children's Hospital, and fellowship in pediatric infectious diseases at the University of Washington/Seattle Children's before joining the UCSD faculty in 1997.

== Research ==
Nizet's publication record reveals work on molecular genetic approaches to discover and characterize bacterial virulence factors involved in host cell injury, epithelial adherence, cellular invasion, inflammation, molecular mimicry and resistance to immunologic clearance. The group focuses on the function of host phagocytic cells, such as macrophages and neutrophils, to understand the contribution of host factors such as antimicrobial peptides, leukocyte surface receptors, signal transduction pathways, and transcription factors in defense against invasive bacterial infection. Additional lines of translational research pursue therapeutic strategies for serious or antibiotic-resistant infections are pursued including neutralization of bacterial virulence phenotypes, pharmacologic augmentation of host phagocyte function, and repurposing of existing drugs for unexpected beneficial activities operating at the host-pathogen interface.

Nizet's other focus areas include cross-disciplinary research and educational program development, enhancing graduate and postdoctoral training in biological, medical and pharmaceutical sciences.

Nizet has authored over 560 peer-reviewed publications and has collaborated with several biotechnology interests in developing new antibiotic and immune-based therapies against drug-resistant pathogens. His contributions have been recognized by the E. Mead Johnson Award for Research in Pediatrics, the DC White Award from the Interdisciplinary Research and Mentoring from the American Society of Microbiology, and an NIH Merit Award. He has been elected to the American Society for Clinical Investigation, the Association of American Physicians, the American Academy of Microbiology, the American Association for the Advancement of Science, the American Institute for Medical and Biological Engineering, and the National Academy of Medicine.
