= David Lopez-Carr =

American geography researcher

Professor David Lopez-Carr Prof.
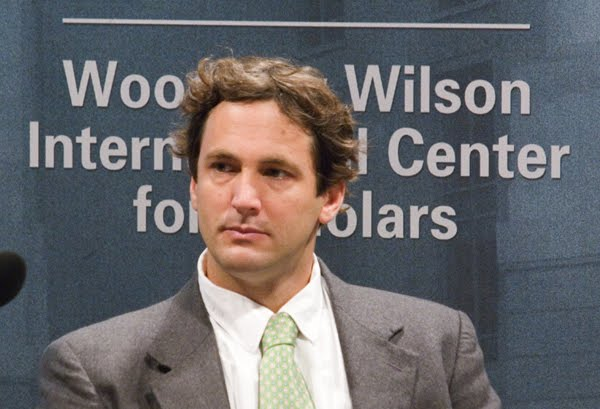
- Citizenship: US
- Occupation: Professor of geography

Academic background
- Education: University of North Carolina

Academic work
- Discipline: Geography
- Institutions: University of California at Santa Barbara; University of California Global Health Institute; Broom Center for Demography

David López-Carr became a professor of geography at the University of California at Santa Barbara in 2012, where he directs the Human-Environment Dynamics Lab (HED) and serves as Associate Dean of the University of California Education Abroad Program( UCEAP), and Editor in Chief of Populations. Lopez-Carr is an affiliate professor in Global and International Studies and Latin American & Iberian Studies (LAIS). Lopez-Carr also led the population, health, and environment research group for the Broom Center for Demography and co-directed the Planetary Health Center of Expertise at the University of California Global Health Institute.

== Early life ==
Lopez-Carr had a rural upbringing in New Hampshire and Maine. He graduated from high school in Maine where he was a multi-sport and state record-breaking athlete. He graduated Bates College College Phi Beta Kappa, Magna Cum Laude, and with Highest Honors in 1993. After graduating, he had a brief stint as a legislative assistant for former US Senate Majority Leader, George Mitchell. Subsequently, Lopez-Carr worked in Ecuador on a Fulbright grant. There he also worked as a tour guide in the Ecuadorian Amazon and as a Spanish and English translator of Latin American history, poetry and environmental law. He went on to become a graduate researcher with the Carolina Population Center at the University of North Carolina.

He has lived, worked, and traveled in over 70 countries worldwide and speaks Spanish, Portuguese, Italian, French, and rudimentary Q’eqchí Maya. Professor López-Carr uses mixed methods to examine potential win-win outcomes for people and the environment.

== Education ==
Lopez-Carr graduated from Orono High School and studied abroad for a year in La Palma del Condado, Huelva, Spain. He attended Bates College in 1993. He went on to become a graduate researcher with the Carolina Population Center at the University of North Carolina. After receiving a PhD in Geography from the University of North Carolina in 2002, he was a NIH post-doctoral fellow in Biostatistics in the School of Public Health and Carolina Population Center.

== Research ==
His current research focuses on links among population, health, rural development, agriculture, and marine and forest resource use, conservation, and how livelihood links to natural systems across local to regional scales. He designs, collects, and analyzes respondent data integrated with remote sensing and secondary social and biophysical data, modeled spatially and hierarchically. He has ongoing projects in Latin America, Africa, and Asia and has collaborated with conservation and development organizations including WWF, CI, TNC, and the United States Agency for International Development (USAID). He was a lead author of the United Nations Environment Program's (UNEP) Fifth and Seventh Global Environmental Outlooks published as the UN's position statement for the Rio de Janeiro 2012 World Summit.

His over 230 scholarly works, with a focus on links among population, health, rural livelihood vulnerability and resilience, agriculture, and marine and forest resource use and conservation through ongoing projects in California, Latin America, Africa, and Asia, have been cited over 7,600 times, most published in leading journal, including 2 in Nature and 2 in PNAS. His scholarship has been supported by over 10 million USD from over 80 fellowships, grants, and awards from NASA, NOAA, NSF, NIH, the Mellon, two Fulbright Fellowships, and numerous other sources.

== Professional appointments ==
- Associate Dean, UC Education Abroad Program. 2023–present.
- Affiliate Researcher, UC Center for Climate, Health, and Equity, 2021–present.
- Co-Director and PI, UC Global Health Institute (UCGHI) Planetary Health Center of Expertise. 2016-2020. Launched UC-wide Ambassador Program; Provided seed grants for UC interdisciplinary projects at 10 UC campuses; Organized and provided UC-wide Planetary Health Study Abroad Grants.
- Professor, Department of Geography, University of California, Santa Barbara. 2012–present.
- Director, Latin American and Iberian Studies, University of California, Santa Barbara. 2012-2015.
- Affiliate Faculty, Global and International Studies, 2010–present; Interdisciplinary Program in Marine Sciences, 2007–present; Latin American and Iberian Studies, 2006–present.
- Area Director: Population and Environment, Broom Center for Demography, University of California, Santa Barbara. 2010-2020.
- Research Associate, Center for Comparative Immigration Studies (CCIS) at University of California, San Diego. 2010- 2020.
- Research Associate, University of California Center for U.S.-Mexican Studies (USMEX). 2009-2017.
- Associate Professor, Department of Geography, University of California, Santa Barbara. 2008-2012. Adjunct Faculty, Department of Geography, San Diego State University. 2008–present.
- Lead Social Scientist, SBC Long Term Ecological Research Network (LTER). 2010-2015.
- Associate Investigator, Santa Barbara Channel (SBC) and Moorea Coral Reef (MCR) Long Term Ecological Research Network (LTER). 2007-2015.
- Assistant Professor, Department of Geography, University of California, Santa Barbara. 2004-2008.
- National Institutes of Health Post-Doctoral Scholar, Department of Biostatistics, University of North Carolina, Chapel Hill, NC. 2002-2004.

== Awards ==
=== Academic and professional awards ===
- With co-authors, 2024 Ecological Society of America's (ESA) Sustainability Science Award
- 2024 Association of American Geographers (AAG) Human Dimensions of Global Change (HDGC) Specialty Group Research Excellence Award
- International Champion and United States National Champion Frontiers Planet Prize from the US National Academy of Sciences (2024)
- Research Excellence Award, American Association of Geographers (AAG) Human Dimensions of Global Change (HDGC) Specialty Group (2024)
- Research Excellence Award Population Specialty Group (PSG) of the Association of American Geographers (AAG) (2017)
- Kavli/National Academy of Science Frontiers of Science Fellow (2013)
- American Association for the Advancement of Science (AAAS) Fellow (2014–present). One of 20 selected in 2014 to the Geology and Geography Section. For distinguished contributions in the field of geography, particularly for advancing our scientific understanding of the coupled process of human population dynamics and environmental change. (https://news.ucsb.edu/2014/014617/david-lopez-carr-named-aaas-fellow)
- Shared Nobel Peace Prize VIP honoree (2008) (ATHGO International 5th Annual Global Forum on Global Warming and Climate Change, UCLA. February 28, 2008)
- Harold C. Pillsbury Research Award (2007) (First Author: Laura Boschini. 2007)
- University of North Carolina Post-doctoral Award for Research Excellence (2004)
- Nystrom Award for best paper based on a dissertation in Geography (2004)
- Fulbright Fellow to Ecuador (1993–95) and Guatemala (1999-2000)

=== Teaching and Mentoring Awards ===
- (AAG) Human Dimensions of Global Change (HDGC) Specialty Group Justice, Equity, Diversity, and Inclusion Award (2025)
- Conference of Latin American Geography Teaching Award (2024)
- AAG Susan Hardwick Excellence in Mentoring Award (2022)
- UCSB Faculty Senate Exceptional Service Award (2013)

== Teaching and Mentoring Notables ==
=== Teaching ===
At the university and system levels López-Carr has:

- Served on nearly all departmental standing committees, chairing several
- Served on numerous search committees
- Represented the department in the Faculty Legislature.
- Served on dozens of Faculty Senate and interdepartmental committees
- Helped launch 4 interdepartmental PhD emphases
- Been a Broom Center for Demography Area Director
- Launched and co-led the UC-wide Planetary Health Center
- Served as UCEAP(University of California Education Abroad Program) Associate Dean (still ongoing)
- Directed LAIS
- Co-advised the Geography Club

=== Mentoring ===
López-Carr has supported as committee member numerous UCSB graduate students – nearly all with a PhD; the majority as (co)chair or primary JDP faculty sponsor. López-Carr has also mentored undergraduates and post-docs/visiting scholars.

- Virtually all have earned multiple awards, including several NSF, NASA, and Fulbright fellowships.
- Several have attained faculty positions at universities such as U. North Carolina, Seattle U., U. of Minnesota, UCSD, U. Hawaii, and Brown.
- Others work for agencies such as the USDA, USGS, and CI.

== DEI and International Notables ==
=== Leadership in promoting DEI ===
- López-Carr serves as Chair of the UCSB and the UC DEI Faculty Senate Committees as well as on a host of related committees. This led to him being recognized with the 2013 UCSB Faculty Senate Exceptional Service Award.

=== International Notables ===
López-Carr has:

- Served on dozens of international scholarly group, steering/advisory boards, grant/award selection and task force committees, chairing several, organized and chaired dozens of conference sessions.
- Delivered over 85 invited talks at prestigious institutions internationally, and served as an AAG Career & Research Mentor.
- Remained a nominator for the MacArthur Fellows Program.
- Continued to contribute as associate editor and editorial board member for 7 journals.
- Applied his profession to policy in collaboration with conservation and development organizations such as the UNEP, FAO, World Bank, CI, TNC, WWF, IPCC, IHDP, and USAID, and to K-12 and public outreach.

== Other Notables ==
- Top Scholar by ScholarGPS (https://scholargps.com/) in recognition of a ‘’strong publication record, the impact of your work, and the notable quality of your scholarly contributions have placed you in the top 0.5% of all scholars worldwide.’’ 2024.
