= Eburnation =

Eburnation is a degenerative process of bone commonly found in patients with osteoarthritis or non-union of fractures. Friction in the joint causes the reactive conversion of the sub-chondral bone to an ivory-like surface at the site of the cartilage erosion. The word derives from Latin eburneus, which means "of ivory".

Osteoarthritis is a degenerative disease of the joints characterized largely by central loss of cartilage and compensatory peripheral bone formation (osteophytes). Cameron and Macnab determined that "corrosive wear and abrasive wear play a part in producing eburnation.

Laiger observed that eburnation can result from both osteoarthritis (OA) and rheumatoid arthritis (RA) at an advanced stage. They stated that while RA and ochronotic arthropathy have different processes, both may result in similar eburnation patterns.

Over time, as the cartilage wears away, bare, subchondral bone is revealed. Eburnation describes the bony sclerosis which occurs at the areas of cartilage loss.
