= University of Sydney School of Biological Sciences =

School of Biological Sciences
- Type: Public
- Affiliations: University of Sydney
- Location: Camperdown / Darlington, Sydney, New South Wales, Australia; 33.888255°S 151.190873°E
- Website: sydney.edu.au/science/biology

The School of Biological Sciences is a constituent body of the Faculty of Science at the University of Sydney, Australia.
