= Gilbert Ashwell =

American biochemist

- Born: July 16, 1916; Jersey City, New Jersey
- Died: June 27, 2014 (aged 97); Washington, D.C.
- Education: University of Illinois Urbana-Champaign (B.A., M.S.)
- Known for: Discovery of asialoglycoprotein
- Scientific career
- Fields: Role of ceruloplasmin in Wilson disease
- Institutions: Columbia University, National Institute of Diabetes and Digestive and Kidney Diseases

Gilbert Ashwell (July 16, 1916 – June 27, 2014) was an American biochemist at the National Institutes of Health. He was elected as a member of the National Academy of Sciences for his work with Anatol Morell in isolating the first cell receptor.

== Biography ==
Ashwell was born in Jersey City, New Jersey in 1916. After high school, he initially went to Worcester Polytechnic Institute in Massachusetts and transferred to the University of Illinois Urbana-Champaign, where he received a B.A. in 1938 and M.S. in 1941. He then went to Columbia University in New York, which was closer to his hometown, to spend two years doing research. In 1950, Ashwell joined the National Institute of Arthritis, Metabolism, and Digestive Diseases. This Institute had grown and later split into two institutes, which are the National Institute of Arthritis and Musculoskeletal and Skin Diseases and the National Institute of Diabetes and Digestive and Kidney Diseases. Ashwell worked at the latter as an emeritus scientist after his retirement.

== Ashwell's research ==
Ashwell's goal as a researcher was to devise a labeling serum glycoproteins in order to study the role of ceruloplasmin in Wilson disease. With another researcher named Anatol G. Morell, he worked to propose that membrane lectins remove senescent circulating glycoproteins, and discovered one of the earliest known carbohydrate receptors. They were able to devise a labeling procedure which allowed them to remove enzymes of the glycoproteins' sialic acid residue. By completing this process, they were able to incorporate other substances into the protein. In 1974, Ashwell and Morell happened to discover that a certain receptor in a human's liver is able to recognize a specific glycoprotein called asialoglycoprotein. Ashwell explained that he was not specifically looking for the asialoglycoprotein when he found it.

Ashwell died on June 27, 2014, from pneumonia in a Washington, D.C., area hospital. He was 97.

== See also ==
- Mucin
