= UC San Diego School of Biological Sciences =

Academic unit of the University of California, San Diego

- Type: Public
- Established: 1960
- Affiliations: University of California, San Diego
- Chancellor: Pradeep Khosla
- Dean: Kit Pogliano (2018 – Present)
- Academic staff: 158
- Undergraduates: 6,375
- Doctoral students: 227
- Location: La Jolla, California, United States; 32.8801°N 117.234°W
- Website: www.bio.uci.edu

The School of Biological Sciences (formerly the Department of Biology and the Division of Biological Sciences) is an academic division of the University of California, San Diego (UCSD) devoted to research and education in biology. One of the UCSD's founding departments, it was established in 1960 as the Department of Biology with the American biochemist David M. Bonner serving as founding director, and is currently organized into four academic departments: Cell and Developmental Biology, Molecular Biology, Ecology, Behavior & Evolution, and Neurobiology.

It contains roughly 18% and 6.1% of UCSD's undergraduate and PhD student population respectively. The PhD program in the School is jointly administered with the Salk Institute for Biological Studies and ranked first in the nation based on the United States National Research Council rankings, within the "Biology/Integrated Biology/Integrated Biomedical Sciences" category.

== Degree programs ==
Since its fouding in 1960, the School of Biological Sciences was regularly the largest academic division of UCSD, and the university ranked highest among the University of California system for the proportion of its undergraduates in STEM majors, particularly in biology. In 1980, forty-one percent of UCSD undergraduates were in STEM majors, compared to 20% at both UC Berkeley and UCLA. By 1991, non-STEM majors had reached a slight majority at UCSD.

=== Undergraduate ===
The School of Biological Sciences offers seven majors:

- Bioinformatics
- General Biology
- Human Biology
- Microbiology
- Molecular and Cell Biology
- Ecology, Behavior and Evolution

=== Graduate ===
The main doctoral program in the School of Biological Sciences was founded with the department and is currently jointly administered with the Salk Institute. The arragement was established in December 1992, and included 27 of the Salk Institute's then-47 faculty members. Since then, the School of Biological Sciences and the Salk Institute have had large organizational overlap. Faculty from the School of Biological Sciencesalso participate in the Biomedical Sciences Graduate Program, an interdisciplinary MD-PhD program of the UC San Diego School of Medicine. The School also offers a joint doctoral program in molecular biology with San Diego State University.

== Research ==
In addition to its close affiliation with the Salk Institute, the School houses six internal research institutes:

- Kavli Institute for Brain and Mind
- UC San Diego Natural Reserve System
- The Airborne Institute for Disease in a Changing Climate
- Wu-Tsai Human Performance Alliance
- Center for Circadian Biology and Medicine
- Tata Institute for Genetics and Society

== History ==
The school was established in 1960, with founding faculty including Seymour Jonathan Singer, Stanley E. Mills, and Jack DeMoss. Originally, UCSD's research focus was largely devoted to oceanography, physics, chemistry, and biology, and the education endeavor followed suit. In the 1980s, the School suffered under the Reagan administration's radical cuts to the NIH, though these were partially restored by Congress. In May 1987, the School opened the Molecular Genetics Lab, perhaps the first general purpose sequencing and analysis core unit for both internal university and private usage. In May 1990, founding faculty member Stanley Mills resigned from the School of Biological Science's rigorous math and writing remediation pilot program amid various accusations of mismanagement. In June 2023, the School substantially reduced its staff of undergraduate teaching assistants after a UAW contract negotiation to which that group was a party began requiring the University to denote these roles formally as teaching assistants rather than "Instructional Assistants". Several faculty anonymously reported that the staff reductions would be catastrophic for student success, and 75 signed a petition for additional funding to the department.

== Notable alumni ==
- Fred Ramsdell (1983)
- Kathleen Rubins (1999)
- Paul Knoepfler (1998)
