= Jeffrey Esko =

American academic

Jeffrey David Esko, Ph.D., M.D. (h.c) is currently a Distinguished Professor of Cellular and Molecular Medicine and a Founding Director of the Glycobiology Research and Training Center at the University of California, San Diego. His research focuses on understanding the structure, biosynthesis and biological roles of proteoglycans in cells and model organisms. Esko popularized proteoglycans through his pioneering genetic and functional studies in cells and model organisms. He discovered the dependence of tumor formation on heparan sulfate, the first small molecule inhibitors of heparan sulfate, the action of proteoglycans as receptors for hepatic lipoprotein clearance and for delivery of therapeutic agents. Esko cofounded Zacharon Pharmaceuticals and TEGA Therapeutics. He was an editor and author of the first textbook in the Glycobiology field, Essentials of Glycobiology, which is currently in its fourth edition.

== Education ==
Esko received his Ph.D.in Biochemistry at the University of Wisconsin in Madison. After an independent fellowship at the Molecular Biology Institute at the University of California, Los Angeles, he moved to the University of Alabama at Birmingham and then to the Department of Cellular and Molecular Medicine at the University of California, San Diego in 1996 to help build a program in Glycobiology. He has published over 350 scholarly papers, reviews and book chapters and was editor/author of the first textbook in the field, Essentials of Glycobiology (1st, 2nd, 3rd, and 4th editions). The 2nd through 4th editions of Essentials of Glycobiology are made freely available online and became one of the pioneering textbooks to be distributed electronically.

== Early work ==
Esko’s work has focused on the structure, assembly and function of heparan sulfate proteoglycans for the last 40 years. In the 1980s, Esko was the first to isolate and characterize animal cell mutants altered in the assembly of heparan sulfate. His studies of the mutants revealed regulatory mechanisms that control the composition of glycosaminoglycans in cells. The mutants provided the first genetic evidence showing that heparan sulfate was required for growth factor activation and tumor growth. These cell lines have been used by hundreds of laboratories worldwide and they served as the benchmark for analysis of proteoglycan deficiencies in other systems, including zebrafish, fruit flies, nematodes and mice. Since 1996, Esko has focused on the development of mutant mice bearing conditional mutations in enzymes involved in heparan sulfate assembly, the development of small molecule inhibitors, and analytical methods for characterizing heparan sulfate structure and proteoglycan core proteins.

== Current Research Interests ==
Work in his laboratory continues to focus on the structure, biosynthesis, and function of proteoglycans in development and disease using forward and reverse genetic methods. This includes development of animal models lacking key enzymes involved in proteoglycan assembly; application of genome-wide methods to identify novel genes involved in heparan sulfate assembly; analysis of agents that bind to proteoglycans; studies of proteoglycans in lipoprotein metabolism in the liver and macrophages; and studies of proteoglycan-associated receptors with particular emphasis on the vasculature, inflammation and sepsis. He developed a carrier that exploits proteoglycans for delivery of high molecular weight cargo and used it for enzyme replacement therapy for lysosomal storage disorders and developed a facile method for diagnosis of mucopolysaccharidoses. Most recently, he has turned his attention to the eye and the role heparan sulfate in age-related macular degeneration, working closely with his collaborator, Dr. Christopher Toomey. Esko's work is best described as cross-disciplinary, spanning chemistry, biochemistry, cell biology, genetics, and physiology.

== Honors and Boards ==
His work has been recognized by the Karl Meyer Award (2007), the highest honor from the Society for Glycobiology, the IGO award from the International Glycoconjugate Organization (2011), the President's Innovator Award (2025) from the Society for Glycobiology, and a MERIT Award from the National Institutes of Health (2000-2010). He won Mizutani research grants in 1995 and 2007 and was recently elected as a Fellow of the American Association for the Advancement of Science. Esko received (an honorary doctorate from Uppsala University, Sweden in January 2010 for his outstanding achievement in the field of glycobiology and for being an important collaborator and inspiring partner for Uppsala proteoglycan glycobiologists. He has given several named lectureships, including the Blaffer lecture at MD Anderson and the WALS lecture at the National Institutes of Health. Esko has served on the numerous scientific, advisory, and editorial boards (Journal of Biochemistry, Journal of Biological Chemistry, Journal of Cell Biology, Glycobiology and as an ad hoc reviewer for Proceedings of the National Academy of Sciences, Journal Clinical Investigation, Matrix Biology, Nature and Science). Additionally, he served as President of the Society for Glycobiology in 2002-2003 and as Director of the Biomedical Sciences Graduate Program at UCSD.
