= William Yang Wang =

American computer scientist

- Occupations: Computer scientist and academic

Academic background
- Education: Shenzhen University (BE); Columbia University (MS); Carnegie Mellon University (PhD)

Academic work
- Institutions: University of California, Santa Barbara

William Yang Wang is a computer scientist and academic. He is the Mellichamp Professor of Mind and Machine Intelligence at the University of California, Santa Barbara.

Wang's research work has centered on connecting language, vision, and the empirical study of generative intelligence. He is the recipient of IEEE SPS Pierre-Simon Laplace Award and British Computer Society's Karen Spärck Jones Award.

== Education and early career ==
Wang completed his B.Eng. in Computer Science from the School of Information Engineering at Shenzhen University in 2009, followed by an M.S. in Computer Science from Columbia University in 2011. From 2011 to 2012, he worked as an R. K. Mellon Presidential Fellow at Carnegie Mellon University. Later, he obtained his Ph.D. in Computer Science from Carnegie Mellon University in 2016.

== Career ==
From 2013 to 2016, Wang worked as a research fellow at Carnegie Mellon University. In 2016, he joined University of California as an assistant professor, became associate professor in 2021, and professor in 2023. In 2019, he was appointed as Duncan and Suzanne Mellichamp Chair in Artificial Intelligence and Designs. He was employed at Amazon Web Services as a visiting academic in 2022.

Wang is a founder and CEO of ChipAgents and holds the position of director of the UCSB Responsible Machine Learning Center, UCSB NLP Group, and UCSB Mind and Machine Intelligence Initiative.

== Research ==
Wang's research interests have focused on Machine Learning (ML), Natural Language Processing (NLP), and Artificial Intelligence (AI), investigating reasoning methods and generative models in particular. In 2017, he presented LIAR, a dataset for detecting fake news, and determined that a CNN model that combined text and meta-data performed better than deep learning models that only used text. Together with Xiong and Hoang, he used accuracy-aware reward functions and established a DeepPath learning reinforcement approach for multi-hop reasoning in graphs of knowledge. In other work based on vision-language navigation, he introduced Reinforced Cross-Modal Matching (RCM).

Wang carried out a survey to assess the NLP techniques for detecting fake news and suggested solutions to enable platforms to tackle false information.

== Awards and honors ==
- 2019 – IBM Faculty Award, International Business Machines (IBM)
- 2020 – AI's 10 to Watch: The Future of AI Award, IEEE Computer Society
- 2021 – CAREER Award, National Science Foundation
- 2022 – Karen Spärck Jones Award, British Computer Society
- 2023 – CRA-E Undergraduate Research Faculty Mentoring Award, Computing Research Association (CRA)
- 2024 – Pierre-Simon Laplace Early Career Technical Achievement Award, IEEE Signal Processing Society

== Selected articles ==
- William Yang Wang (2017). ""Liar, Liar Pants on Fire": A New Benchmark Dataset for Fake News Detection". arXiv:1705.00648 [cs.CL].
- Xiong, Wenhan; Hoang, Thien; William Yang Wang (2017). "DeepPath: A Reinforcement Learning Method for Knowledge Graph Reasoning". arXiv:1707.06690 [cs.CL].
- Wang, X.; Huang, Q.; Celikyilmaz, A.; Gao, J.; Shen, D.; Wang, Y. F.; Zhang, L. (2019). "Reinforced Cross-Modal Matching and Self-Supervised Imitation Learning for Vision-Language Navigation". 2019 IEEE/CVF Conference on Computer Vision and Pattern Recognition (CVPR). pp. 6629–6638. arXiv:1811.10092. doi:10.1109/CVPR.2019.00679. ISBN 978-1-7281-3293-8.
- Sun, Tony; Gaut, Andrew; Tang, Shirlyn; Huang, Yuxin; ElSherief, Mai; Zhao, Jieyu; Mirza, Diba; Belding, Elizabeth; Chang, Kai-Wei; William Yang Wang (2019). "Mitigating Gender Bias in Natural Language Processing: Literature Review". arXiv:1906.08976 [cs.CL].
- Wang, X.; Wu, J.; Chen, J.; Lei, L.; Wang, Y. F.; Wang, W. Y. (2019). "VaTeX: A Large-Scale, High-Quality Multilingual Dataset for Video-and-Language Research". 2019 IEEE/CVF International Conference on Computer Vision (ICCV). pp. 4581–4591. arXiv:1904.03493. doi:10.1109/ICCV.2019.00468. ISBN 978-1-7281-4803-8.
