= Guo Hong'an =

Chinese translator (1943–2023)

- 郭宏安
- Born: 2 February 1943; Laiwu County, Shandong, China
- Died: 16 January 2023 (aged 79); Beijing, China
- Education: Peking University; University of Geneva
- Occupation: Translator
- Writing career
- Language: Chinese, French
- Period: 1978–2022
- Genres: Novel, poem
- Notable work: Collected Works of Albert Camus

Guo Hong'an (Chinese: 郭宏安; pinyin: Guō Hóng'ān; 2 February 1943 – 16 January 2023) was a Chinese translator most notable for being one of the main translators into Chinese of the works of the French poet Charles Baudelaire and Albert Camus.

== Biography ==
Guo was born in Laiwu County, Shandong, on 2 February 1943. After graduating from the Department of Western Languages, Peking University in 1966, he successively worked as a staff of the Second Artillery Command and translator of the Xinhua News Agency. From 1975 to 1977, he studied at the French School of Language and Culture at the University of Geneva in Switzerland.

Guo returned to China in 1977 and did his postgraduate work at the Graduate School of the Chinese Academy of Social Sciences. Guo started to publish translations in 1978, and joined the China Writers Association in 1986.

Guo died in Beijing on 16 January 2023, at the age of 79.

== Translations ==
- Collected Works of Albert Camus (Albert Camus) (加缪文集)
- Notesof Albert Camus: 1935–1959 (Albert Camus) (加缪笔记：1935—1959)
- The Outsider/ Sisyphus Myth (Albert Camus) (局外人 西绪福斯神话)
- Yves Bonnefoy (Yves Bonnefoy) (杜弗的动与静)
- Selected Papers on Baudelaire's Aesthetics (Charles Baudelaire) (波德莱尔美学论文选)
- The Flower of Evil (Charles Baudelaire) (恶之花)
- The Melancholy of Paris (Charles Baudelaire) (巴黎的忧郁)
- Artificial Paradise (Charles Baudelaire) (人造天堂)

== Awards ==
- 2012 Fu Lei Translation and Publishing Award for translation of Recueil, written by Albert Camus.
