= Mu Xin =

Mu Xin may refer to:

- Fu Hao (fl. c. 1200 BC), posthumously known as Mu Xin, a wife of King Wu Ding of the Shang dynasty
- Mu Xin (artist) (1927–2011), Chinese painter, calligrapher and writer
