= Mingyuan Hu =

Chinese-British historian

Mingyuan Hu is a British historian and publisher.

Hu read Classics, Philosophy and Art History at the University of Glasgow and won the Herkless Prize in 2008. From the same university she received her PhD in Literary History. Between 2008 and 2023, she held teaching positions at the University of Glasgow and the University of Leeds, and research positions at the Victoria & Albert Museum and Humboldt-Universität zu Berlin. Mingyuan Hu is the biographer of Fou Lei, and also translates French, English, and Chinese literature. She is the founder of Hermits United, a multilingual literary press in London and Paris.

== Selected works ==
=== Monographs ===
- Fou Lei: An Insistence on Truth (Brill, 2017; Hermits United, 2023). (French translation by Maël Renouard: Fou Lai. Un héros vaincu, 2025)
- Late Roses and Early Snow (Hermits United, 2022)
- Mnemosyne (Hermits United, 2022)

=== Translations ===
- Toward Bravery and Other Poems (Hermits United, 2017; 2022) by Mu Xin
- Oratory and Democracy in China: Four Dialogues from the Annals of the Warring States (Hermits United, 2022)
- Virtue Politics: Mencius on Kingly Rule (Hermits United, 2023)
- The Assassins of Confucius (Hermits United, 2023, 2025) by Jean Levi, translated from Les Assassins de Confucius
- Good Beyond Evil: Xunzi on Human Nature (Hermits United, 2023)
- Realpolitik: Han Fei on Mighty Reign (Hermits United, 2023)
- 京劇改革 (Hermits United, 2023) by Maël Renouard, translated from La réforme de l'opéra de Pékin
- The Red Detachment of Women (Hermits United, 2023) by Jiang Yun, co-translated with Annelise Finegan
- Lament in Love: The Verses of Qu Yuan (Hermits United, 2024)
- The Eremitic and Extravagant: Elegance of Personality I (Hermits United, 2024); selected from Shishuo Xinyu
- The Bold and Untrammelled: Elegance of Personality II (Hermits United, 2024); selected from Shishuo Xinyu
- The Life of Julius Caesar (Hermits United, 2024) by George Sand
- George Sand (Hermits United, 2024) by Hippolyte Taine
- My Early Education (Hermits United, 2025) by Hu Shih
- Mes amis (Hermits United, 2026) by Shi Zhecun
