= Nick Zhang =

American computer scientist

- 张晓东
- Born: 30 August 1963 (age 63)
- Known for: CEO of Wuzhen Institute

Nick Zhang (Chinese: 张晓东 (Zhāng Xiǎodōng); born 30 August 1963) is a Chinese writer specializing in philosophy and history of science, and chairman of the Wuzhen Institute. In 2017, his book A Brief History of Artificial Intelligence was awarded Top 10 Books of Southern Metropolis Daily, and in 2018, it was selected as a recommended book at the 13th Wenjin Book Award. In 2018, he won Wu Wenjun Artificial Intelligence Science and Technology Award.

== Education ==
Zhang graduated from Tianjing University in 1985, Chinese Academy of Sciences in 1988, and University of Massachusetts at Amherst in 1992.

== Career ==
Zhang worked at Harvard and HP in his early years. He moved to Silicon Valley in the mid 1990s. In 2010, he invested and helped startups in internet and artificial intelligence area. He has been partner at VC firms. He founded Wuzhen Institute in 2016 in Wuzhen, near Shanghai.

== Works ==
- 杨学良 (1990). UNIX Kernel Anatomy. Beijing: 电子工业出版社. ISBN 750530674X. OCLC 768635388.
- Xiao-Dong Zhang (October 1992). "Complexity of Neural Network Learning in the Real Number Model". Workshop on Physics and Computation. pp. 146–150. doi:10.1109/PHYCMP.1992.615511. ISBN 0-8186-3420-0. S2CID 60703857.
- Zhang, X. N. (June 1997). "Secure Code Distribution". Computer. 30 (6): 76–79. doi:10.1109/2.587552. ISSN 0018-9162.
- 尼克 (2014). 哲学评书 [Philosophical Monologue]. Hang zhou: 浙江大学出版社. ISBN 9787308129824. OCLC 917643212.
- 尼克 (2017). 人工智能简史 [A Brief History of Artificial Intelligence]. Beijing: Beijing Book Co. ISBN 9787115471604. OCLC 1018448318.
- Zhang, N. (2021). A Brief History of Artificial Intelligence (2nd ed.). Beijing: Posts & Telecom Press. ISBN 9787115491718.
- Zhang, N. (2024). Turing Understood. Beijing: Posts & Telecom Press. ISBN 9787115644053.
- Zhang, N. (2026). A Brief History of Artificial Intelligence (3rd ed.). Beijing: Posts & Telecom Press. ISBN 9787115694676.
- Zhang, N. (2026). "What is computation? And why Turing?" Journal of Computer Science and Technology, 41(1), 4–25.
