= Fu Lei =

Chinese writer (1908–1966)

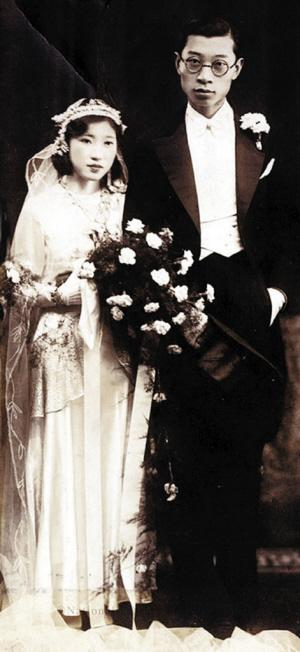
- Fu Lei and Zhu Meifu in 1932
- Born: 7 April 1908; Nanhui, Jiangsu, Great Qing
- Died: 3 September 1966 (aged 58); Shanghai, Jiangsu, China
- Other name: Nu'an
- Education: University of Paris
- Spouse(s): Zhu Meifu (朱梅馥, m.1932)
- Children: Fou Ts'ong (1934 - 2020); Fou Min (b. 1937)
- Parent(s): Fu Peng (d.1912); Li Yuzhen (d. 1933)

Fu Lei (Fou Lei; Chinese: 傅雷; courtesy name Nu'an 怒安, pseudonym Nu'an 怒庵; 7 April 1908 – 3 September 1966) was a Chinese translator and critic. His translation theory was dubbed the most influential in French-Chinese translation. He was known for his renowned renditions of Balzac and Romain Rolland.

== Life and career ==
Born in Nanhui, today a district of Shanghai, Fu was raised by his mother. Between 1928 and 1931 he read literature and art history in Paris, befriending, amongst others, Jacques Maritain and Jean Daniélou. Between 1932 and 1934 he taught art history at Shanghai Art Academy. An occasional critic and curator, for the most part of his working life, Fu Lei translated full-time.

In 1958, Fu was labelled a rightist in the Anti-Rightist Movement, and was politically persecuted. In 1966, at the beginning of the Cultural Revolution, he and his wife Zhu Meifu committed suicide. His letters to his son, the pianist Fou Ts'ong, were published in 1981. Fu Lei's Family Letters is a long-standing best-seller in China.

== Scholarship ==
Fu's close relationship with the artist Huang Binhong is the subject of the 2009 monograph, Friendship in Art: Fou Lei and Huang Binhong, by the Australian scholar Claire Roberts.

Fu's life and work is the subject of the 2017 monograph, Fou Lei: An Insistence on Truth, by the Chinese-British scholar Mingyuan Hu. It chronicles the hitherto unknown Parisian milieu and intellectual formation of Fu Lei through archival documents unearthed in France. Reviewing Fou Lei: An Insistence on Truth, the sinologist and literary scholar John Minford wrote: "Here this absorbing book breaks new and fascinating ground, offering crucial evidence of the growth of a great translator's mind."

== Legacy ==
The Fu Lei Translation and Publishing Award was created in 2009 by the French Embassy in China to recognize the works of Chinese translators and publishers translated from French publications.

== Works ==
Translations

- 1932: Rodin L'Art by Paul Gsell
- 1933: Chalot by Soupault
- 1934: 20 Lectures on World Masterpieces of Art
- 1934: Vie de Tolstoi by Rolland
- 1934: Vie de Michel-Ange by Rolland
- 1935: Voltaire by Maurois
- 1942: Vie de Beethoven by Rolland
- 1949: Eugénie Grandet by Balzac
- 1950: Le Père Goriot by Balzac
- 1953: Colomba by Mérimée
- 1953: Jean-Christophe by Rolland
- 1955: Candide by Voltaire
- 1956: Zadig by Voltaire
- 1963: Philosophie de l'art by Taine
- Cousin Bette, Le Cousin Pons, Colonel Chabert and some other works by Balzac
- The Conquest of Happiness by Bertrand Russell

Letters

- Fu Lei's family letters (Chinese:傅雷家书)

== See also ==
- Fu Lei's residence in Shanghai opened as a museum in 2019.
- Death 死 by Chen Cun 陈村, short story in which the narrator visits the old home of Fu Lei, a dialogue with Fu Lei's ghost on the meaning of life.
