= Fu Lei Translation and Publishing Award =

- Awarded for: Chinese translators and publishers for works translated from French publications.
- Sponsored by: French Embassy in China
- Country: China

The Fu Lei Translation and Publishing Award (French: Le Prix Fu Lei, Chinese: 傅雷翻译出版奖) is an award established in 2009 by the French Embassy in China to recognize the works of Chinese translators and publishers translated from French publications. It is named for the Chinese translator Fu Lei and is awarded annually. There are different categories of awards, including the Jeune Pousse [Young Shoot] award made to the best new translator.

== Recipients of the Fu Lei Award ==
2009 (1st Awards)

- MA Zhenchi 马振骋, for translation of Les Essais de Michel de Montaigne - 《蒙田随笔全集》 - Literature
- ZHANG Zujian 张祖建, for translation of "La Voie des Masques", written by Claude Lévi-Strauss -《面具之道》 - Essay

2010 (2nd Awards)

- LI Yumin 李玉民, for translation of Chagrin D'École, written by Daniel Pennac - 《上学的烦恼》 - Literature
- HU Xiaoyue 胡小跃, for translation of Gaston Gallimard：Un demi-siècle d'édition française, written by Pierre Assouline - 《加斯东·伽利玛：半个世纪的法国出版史》 - Essay

2011 (3rd Awards)

- JIN Longge 金龙格, for translation of Dans le café de la jeunesse perdue, written by Patrick Modiano -《青春咖啡馆》 - Literature
- YANG Yaping 杨亚平, Zhao Jingli 赵静利 and Li Wei 尹伟, for translation of La France des Lumières (1715-1789) written by Pierre-Yves Beaurepaire -《启蒙运动中的法国》 - Essay

2012 (4th Awards)

- GUO Hongan 郭宏安, for translation of Recueil, written by Albert Camus -《加缪文集》 - Literature
- ZHENG Kelu 郑克鲁, for translation of Le Deuxième Sexe, written by Simone de Beauvoir -《第二性》 - Essay

2013 (5th Awards)

- LIU Fang, for her translation of Le Rapport de Brodeck, written by Philippe Claudel - Literature
- SHEN Jian and ZHU Xiaohan, for their translation of L'enfant et la vie familiale sous l'Ancien Régime, written by Philippe Ariès - Essay
- CAO Dongxue, for her translation of De la démocratie en Amérique, written by Alexis de Tocqueville - Young Shoot

2014 (6th Awards)

- AN Ning, for translation of Naissance d’un pont, written by Maylis de Kerangal - Literature
- CAI Hongbin, for translation of L’avenir dure longtemps, written by Louis Althusser - Essay
- YU Jiale, for translation of Bouquiner : Autobiobibliographie, written by Annie François - Young Shoot

2015 (7th Awards)

- ZHOU Xiaoshen, for translation of Le Liseur du 6h 27, written by Jean-Paul Didierlaurent - Literature
- XU Minglong, for translation of Description de J.-B. Du Halde (1735) - Essay
- WANG Minnan, for translation of La querelle de l'art contemporain, written by Marc Jimenez - Young Shoot

2016 (8th Awards)

- JIN Jufang, for translation of L'Acacia, written by Claude Simon - Literature
- ZHOU Peiqiong, for translation of Dans les forêts de Sibérie, written by Sylvain Tesson - Young Shoot

2017 (9th Awards)

- LIN Yuan, for his translation of Retour à Killybegs, written by Sorj Chalandon - Literature
- ZHANG Jujian, for his translation of La misère du monde, written by Pierre Bourdieu - Essay
- MA Jiening, for his translation of Tocqueville : Les sources aristocratiques de la liberté, written by Lucien Jaume - Young Shoot

2018 (10th Awards)

- YUAN Xiaoyi, for translation of Chanson douce, by Leïla Slimani - Literature
- LIANG Shuang and TIAN Meng, for their translation of Le dimanche de Bouvines, by Georges Duby - Essay
- ZHOU Lihong and JIAO Jingshu, for their translation of Les aveux du roman, Le dix-neuvième siècle entre Ancien Régime et Révolution, by Mona Ozouf - Young Shoot

2019 (11th Awards)

- JIN Longge for his translation of D’un château l’autre (Castle to Castle), published by Louis-Ferdinand Céline - fiction
- ZHANG Gen for his translation of Subjectivité et Vérité (Subjectivity and Truth), by Michel Foucault - essay
- KONG Qian for her translation of Kaouther Adimi's Nos Richesses (Our Riches) by Kaouther Adimi - Young Translator

2020 (12th Awards)

- NING Chunyan, for her translation of Dans la Solitude des Champs de Coton, by Bernard-Marie Koltès - Literature
- WANG Wei, for his translation of Jean-Jacques Rousseau: La Transparence et L'obstacle, by Jean Starobinski - Essay
- ZENG Zhaokuang, for his translation of Juger la Reine, by Emmanuel de Waresquiel - Young Shoot

2021 (13th Awards)

- HUANG Yaqin for her translation of The Boy by Marcus Malte - Literature
- ZHANG Wen for her translation of The Experience of the Foreign: Culture and Translation in Romantic Germany by Antoine Berman - Essay
- WANG Xian for her translation of Returning to Reims by Didier Eribon - Young shoot
