= Wuzhen =

Wuzhen 乌镇
- Town
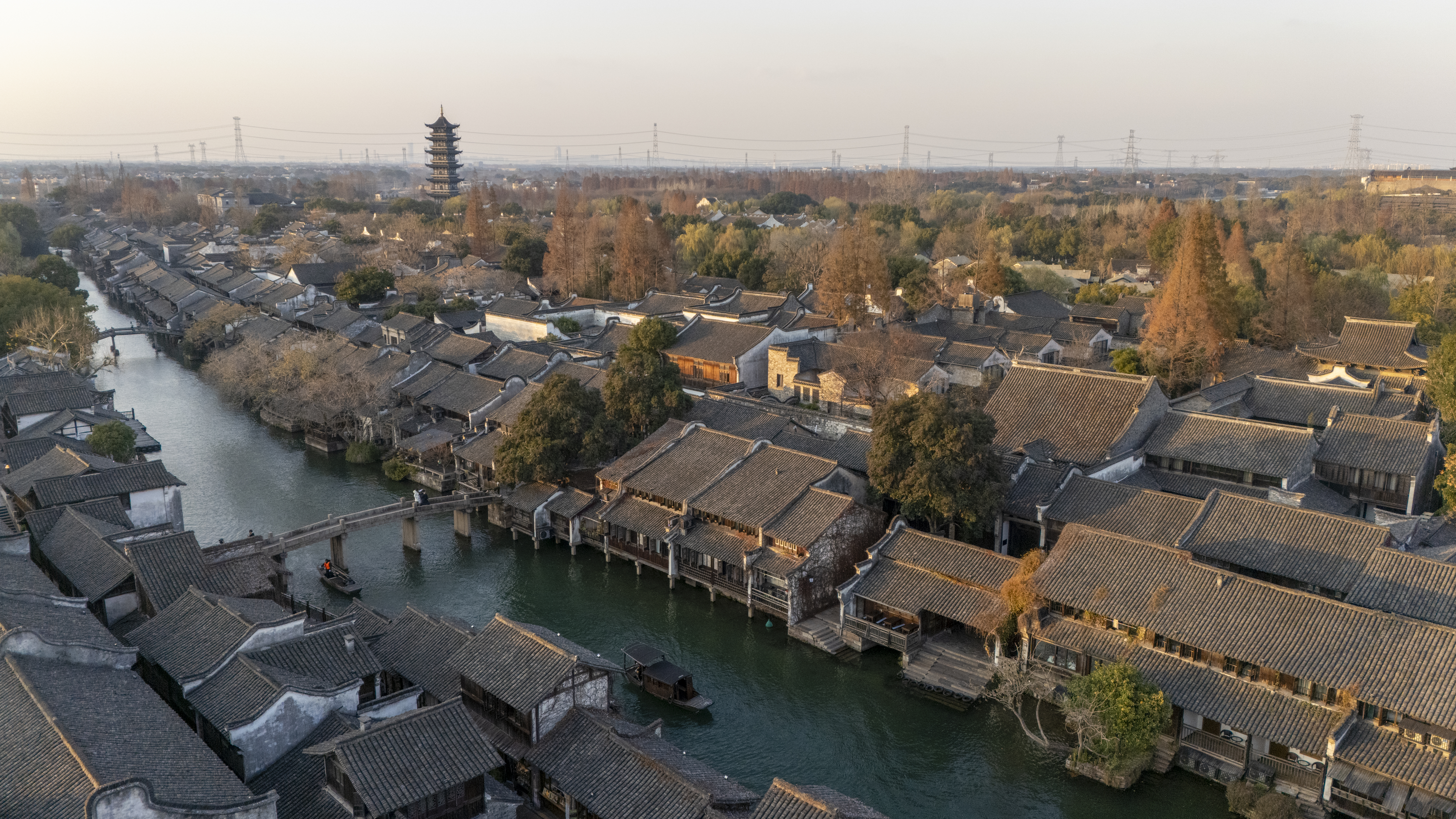
- The canals of Wuzhen have led to it being nicknamed the "Venice of the East"

- Location in Zhejiang
- Coordinates (Wuzhen town government): 30°44′34″N 120°29′16″E
- Country: People's Republic of China
- Province: Zhejiang
- Prefecture-level city: Jiaxing
- County-level city: Tongxiang

Area
  - Total: 71.19 km^{2} (27.49 sq mi)

Population
  - Total: 60,000
  - Density: 840/km^{2} (2,200/sq mi)
- Time zone: UTC+8 (China Standard)
- Postal code: 314501
- Area code: 0573

Wuzhen (Chinese: 乌镇; pinyin: Wūzhèn, Wu: Whu-tsen lit. "Wu Town") is a historic scenic town, part of Tongxiang, located in the north of Zhejiang Province, China. It was primarily built in the 7th century during the Tang dynasty.

It lies within the triangle formed by Hangzhou, Suzhou and Shanghai. Covering an area of 71.19 km^{2} (27.49 sq mi), Wuzhen has a total population of 60,000, of which 12,000 are permanent residents.

Wuzhen has been the permanent host place of the annual World Internet Conference, an international Internet conference held in China, since 2014.

== Location ==
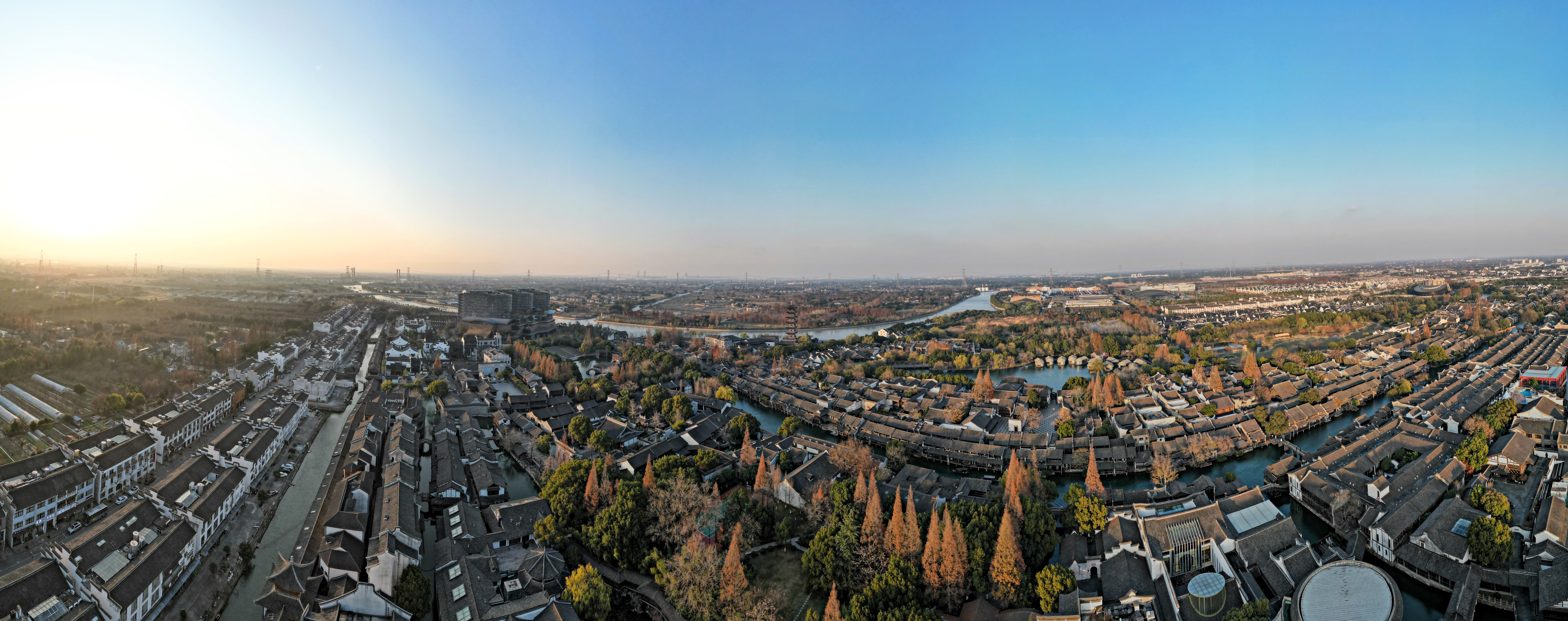
Aerial panorama of Wuzhen 乌镇 Water Town. December 2023.

Located in the centre of the six ancient towns south of the Yangtze River, 17 kilometres (11 mi) north of the city of Tongxiang, Wuzhen displays its history through its ancient stone bridges, stone pathways and delicate wood carvings.

== Notable people ==
- Mao Dun, a renowned modern Chinese revolutionary writer, was born in Wuzhen, and his well-known work, 'The Lin's Shop', describes the life of Wuzhen.
- Mu Xin, a contemporary poet, calligrapher and painter, was born and died in Wuzhen. The Mu Xin Art Museum in the town is dedicated to his work.

== Town layout ==
There are four divisions in Wuzhen, of which Xizha (western district) and Dongzha (eastern district) are famous tourist destinations nowadays. Wuzhen is also divided into six districts. These are: the traditional workshops district, the traditional local-styled dwelling houses district, the traditional culture district, the traditional food and beverage district, the traditional shops and stores district, and the water township customs and life district. Following an east-west-east circuit created by these six districts, visitors can witness reenactment of traditional practices and cultures.

== Former residence of Mao Dun ==
Originally built in the mid 19th century and covering a total area of 650 m^{2} (7,000 sq ft), the former residence of Mao Dun, was the Mao family home for many generations. In 1984, the building was renovated and extended to cover a total area of 1,731.5 m^{2} (18,638 sq ft), opening to the public one year later. In 1988, it was listed as one of the Key State Preserved Relic Units and in 1994 was renamed the Mao Dun Museum of the City of Tongxiang. The house has three exhibition areas: 'Wuzhen, the Hometown of Mao Dun', 'the Way of Mao Dun', and 'the Former Residence of Mao Dun (renovated)'. The present Mao Dun Museum lies to the east of the residence, which was formerly the Lizhi Shuyuan (Aspiration Academy) where Mao Dun spent his early school years.

== Former residence of Mu Xin ==
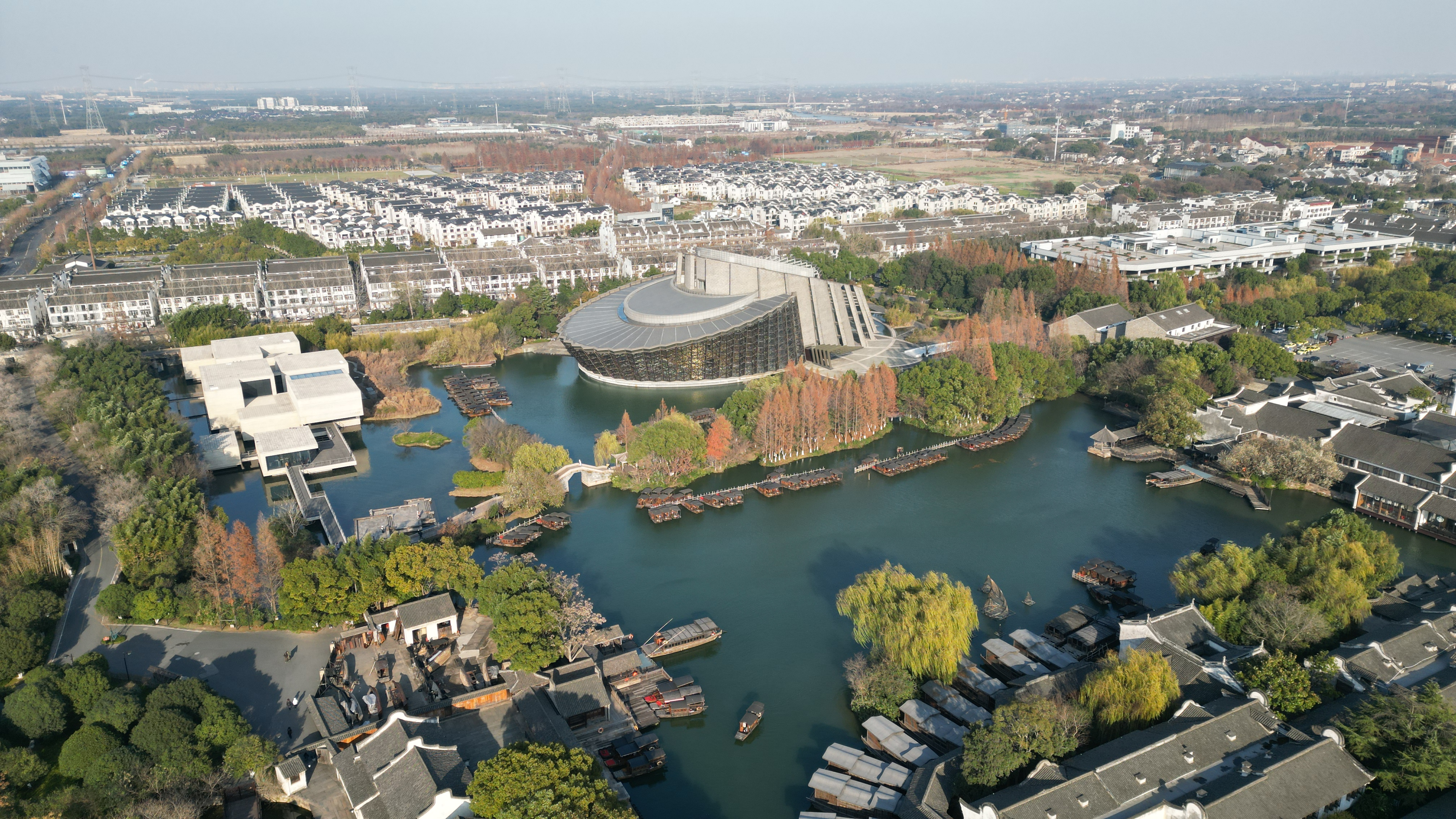
Aerial vistas of Wuzhen Water town and its arts centre

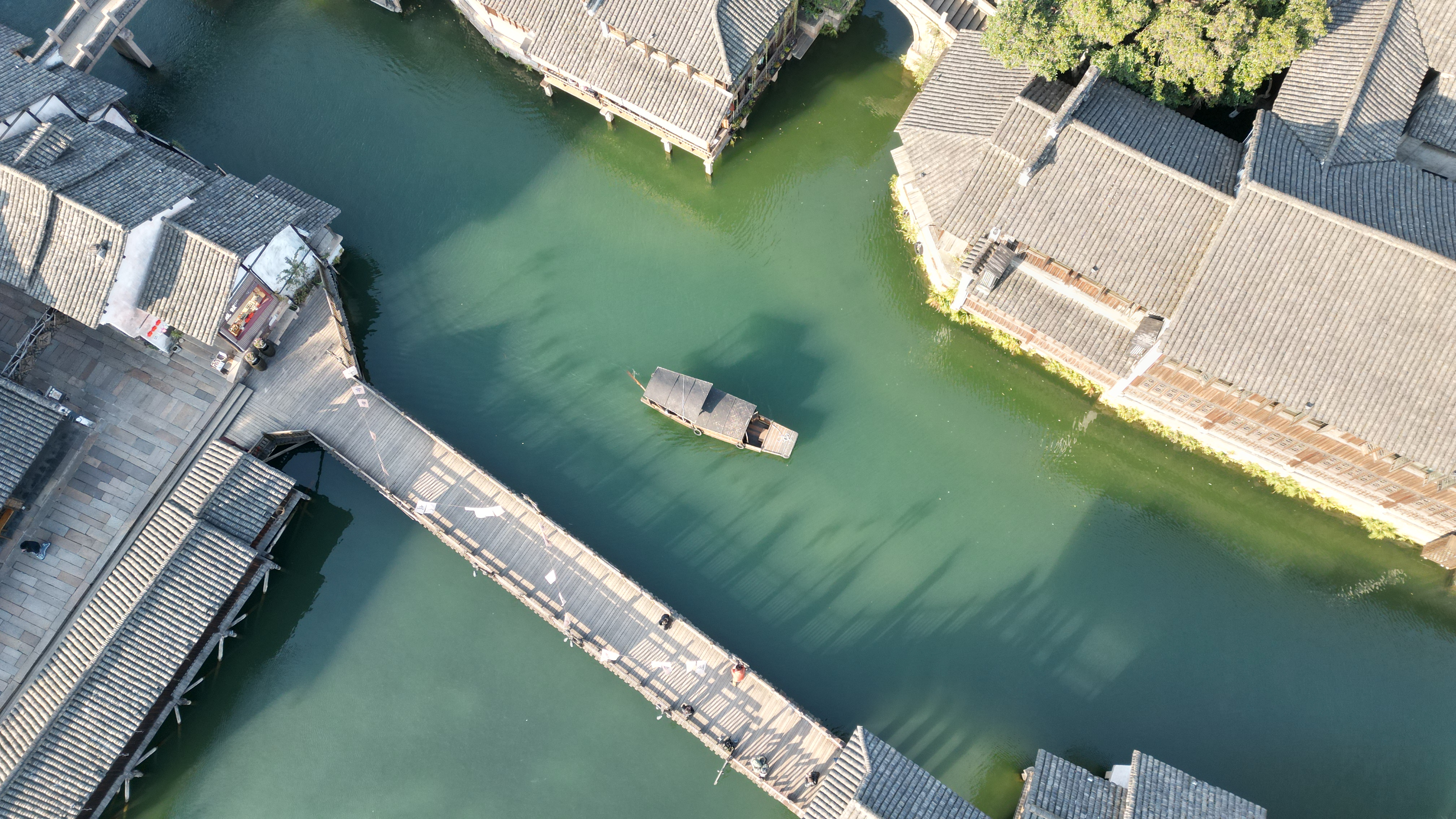
One of the waterways in Wuzhen Ancient Town

This house is located at 186 Caishenwan, Dongzha, where Muxin spent his childhood until the Second Sino-Japanese War. In 1950, Muxin's mother was obliged to donate this house to the local government, and it was later used as a standard and metric Fastener factory. In 1999, the local government renovated this house and returned it to Muxin. Muxin lived in it until he died in 2011.

== Mu Xin Art Museum ==
Mu Xin Art Museum was designed by a pupil of the famous Chinese architecture designer Ieoh Ming Pei in July 2011 and has been open to the public since November 2015. Mu Xin Art Museum is located in Xizha, Wuzhen.

== Fanglu Pavilion (Pavilion of Visits to Lu) ==
The Fanglu Pavilion obtained its name from an accidental meeting between Lu Tong, the owner, and Lu Yu, the Patron Saint of Tea, during the Tang Dynasty (618-907). It is said that Lu Yu once mistakenly ate some poisonous leaves and was rescued by Lu Tong, who happened to collect tea leaves at that time. In return, Lu Yu taught Lu Tong knowledge of tea and tea-making skills, which resulted in the prosperity of Lu Tong's teahouse. At the suggestion of one guest, Lu Tong changed the establishment's name to the Pavilion of Visits to Lu, in memory of this respected scholar. Located to the south of Ying Bridge and backing onto the city river, the teahouse enjoys a broad view of Guanqian Street.

== Bridge within a bridge ==
The "Bridge within a Bridge" is a scenic attraction created by two ancient bridges, the Tongji Bridge which crosses the river from east to west and the Renji Bridge running from south to north that joins the former at one end. Either of two bridges can be seen through the arch of the other, hence the name. Having been rebuilt five times, Tongji Bridge is a 28.4 metres (93 ft) and 3.5 metres (11 ft) one-curvature arch bridge, with a span of 11.8 metres (39 ft). Renji Bridge, which has also undergone repairs during its history, has a length of 22.6 metres (74 ft), a width of 2.8 metres (9.2 ft) and a span of 8.5 metres (28 ft).

Demonstration in the traditional workshops district display traditional crafts as the printing and dyeing of blue printed fabrics, the primitive techniques of cloth shoe making and tobacco-planing. Visitors may operate the machines to get an idea of how the original work was carried out over 200 years ago. The local houses here are decorated with carved wooden and stone doors and windows.

== Art Wuzhen or Wuzhen Contemporary Art Exhibition ==
Art Wuzhen (full title: Wuzhen Contemporary Art Exhibition) is organized by Cultural Wuzhen Co., Ltd. The exhibition was initiated by Chen Xianghong (President of Wuzhen Tourism Co.) and launched in 2016. Both the 2016 and 2019 editions were curated by chief curator Feng Boyi, and curators Wang Xiaosong and Liu Gang. The aim of the exhibition is to link global contemporary art with Wuzhen's distinctive cultural landscape. The exhibition takes places across multiple indoor and outdoor locations in Wuzhen, including The North Silk Factory, Rice Barn and The West Scenic Zone.

In 2016 artists included: Martin Parr, Kiki Smith, Bill Viola, Marina Abramovic, Ai WeiWei, Araki Nobuyoshi, Ann Hamilton, Antti Laitinen, Maya Ying Lin and Damien Hirst. In 2019 for the exhibition titled 'Now is the Time' there were over 50 exhibiting artists including: James Beckett, Cheng Sung-Chih, Children of the Light, Rineke Dijkstra, Humans since 1982, Lee Bul, Anish Kapoor, Rafael Lozano-Hemmer, Amalia Ulman, Julian Opie, Yang Fudong, Zimoun.

== Gallery ==
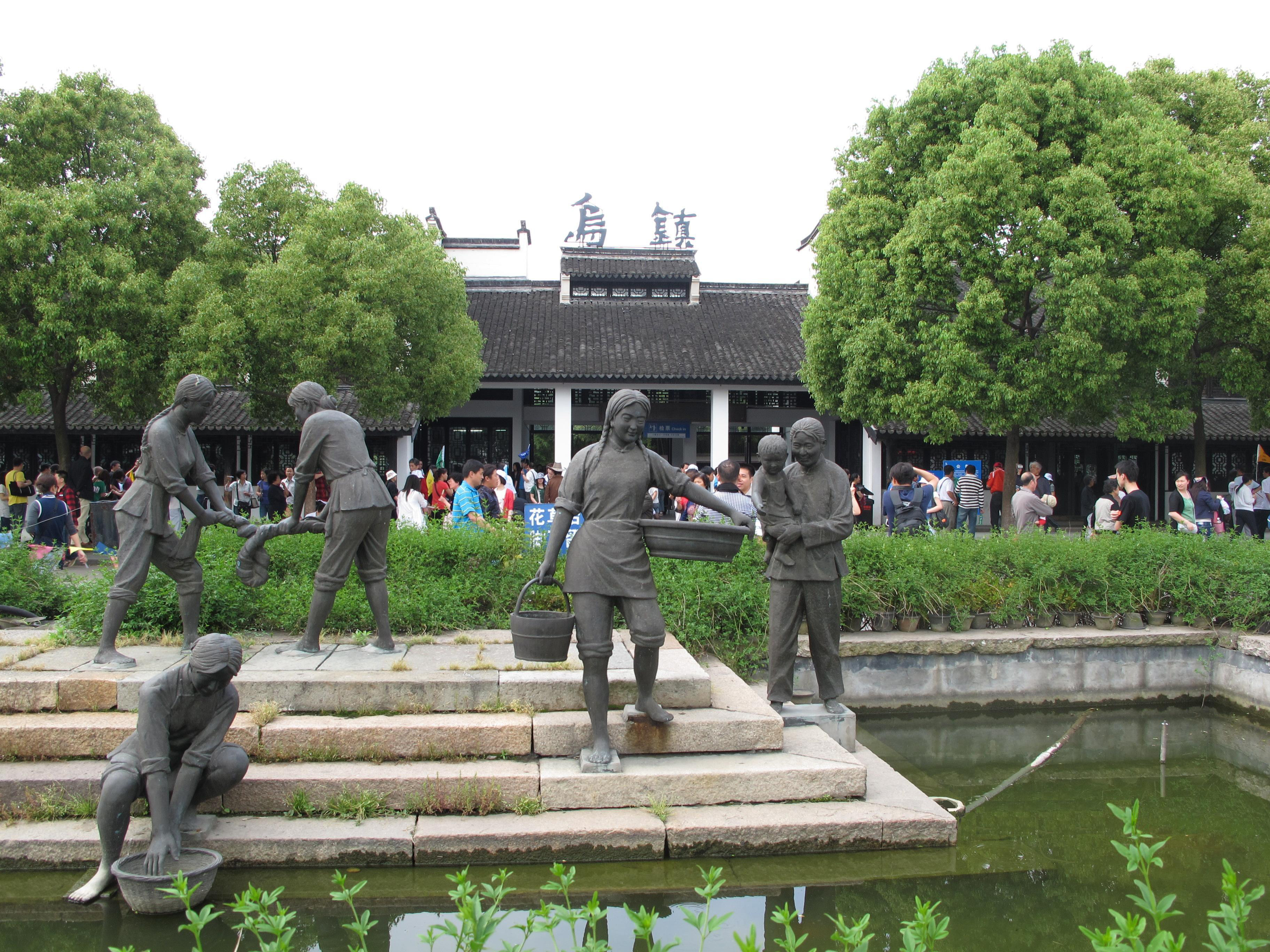
Riverside sculptures with the characters "Wuzhen" in the background

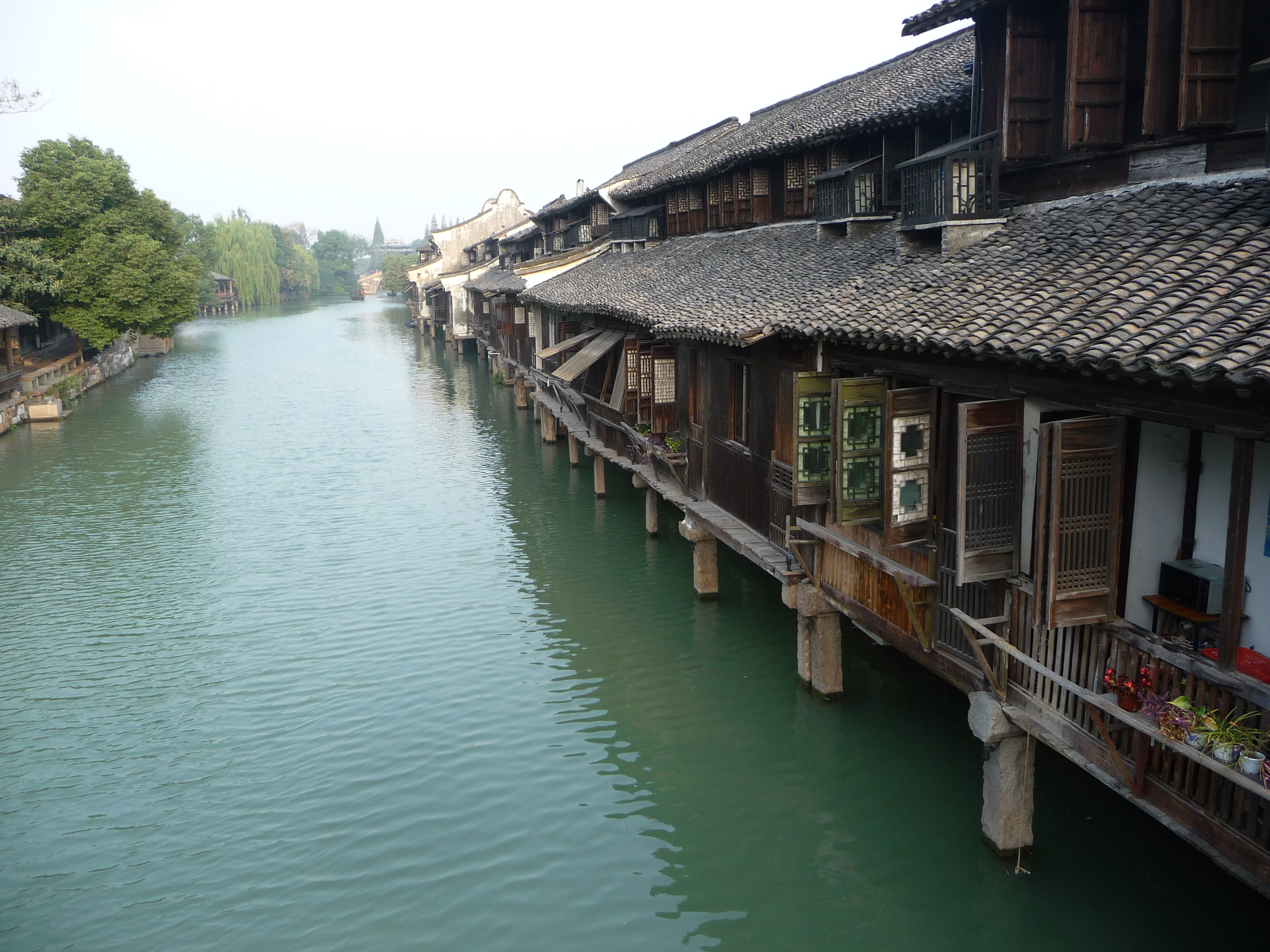
Waterfront houses

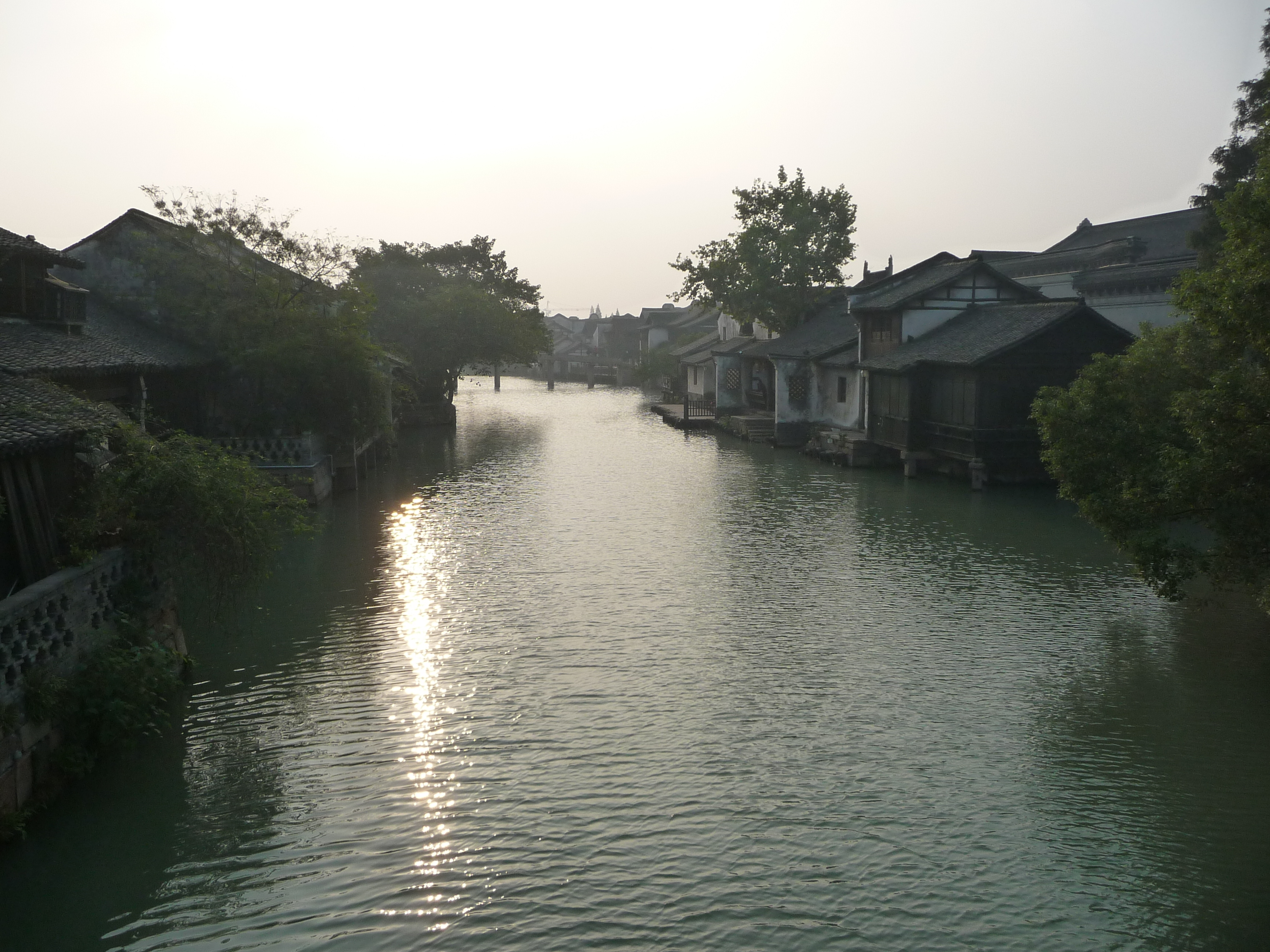
Wuzhen at sunset

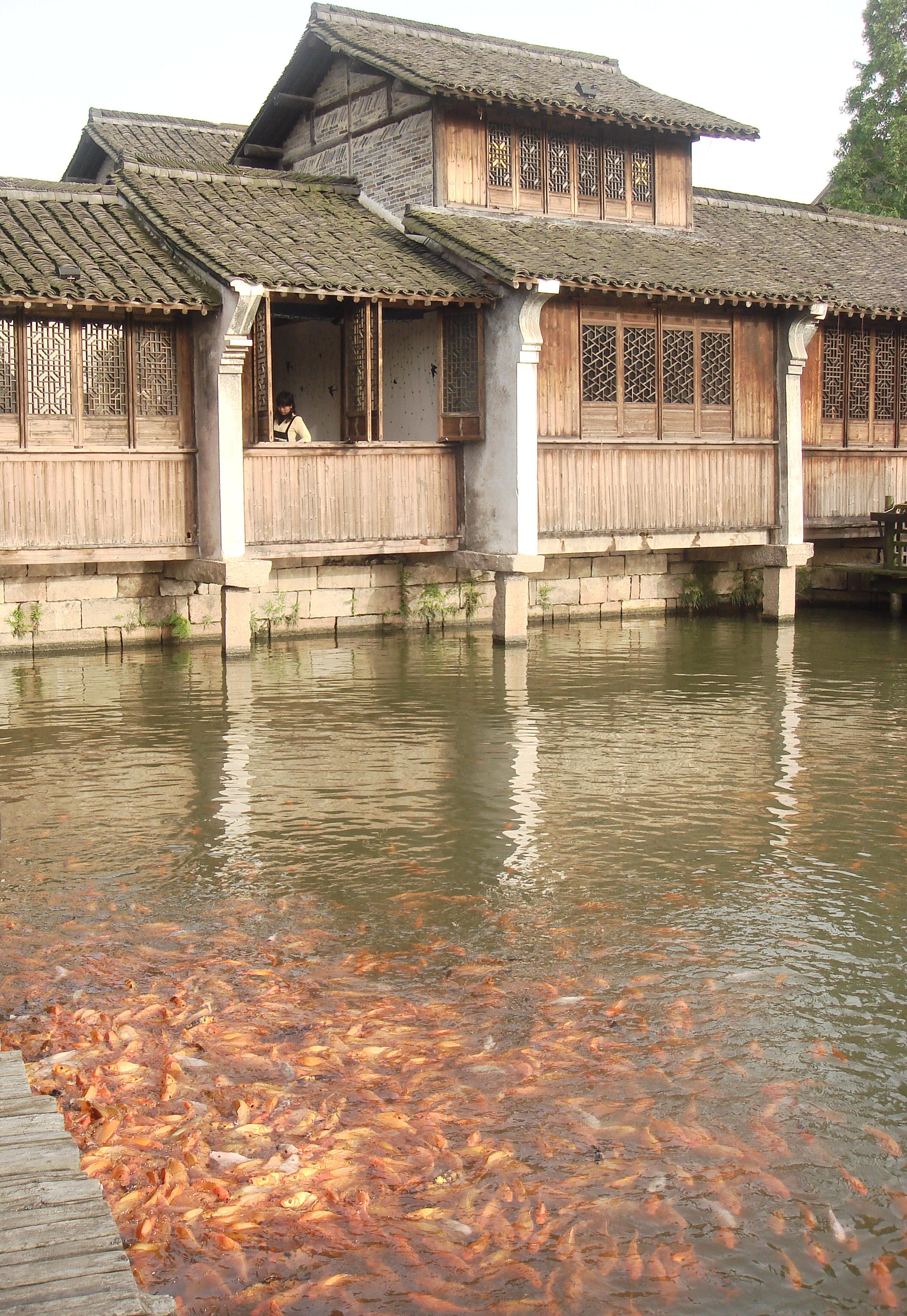
Koi in a pond

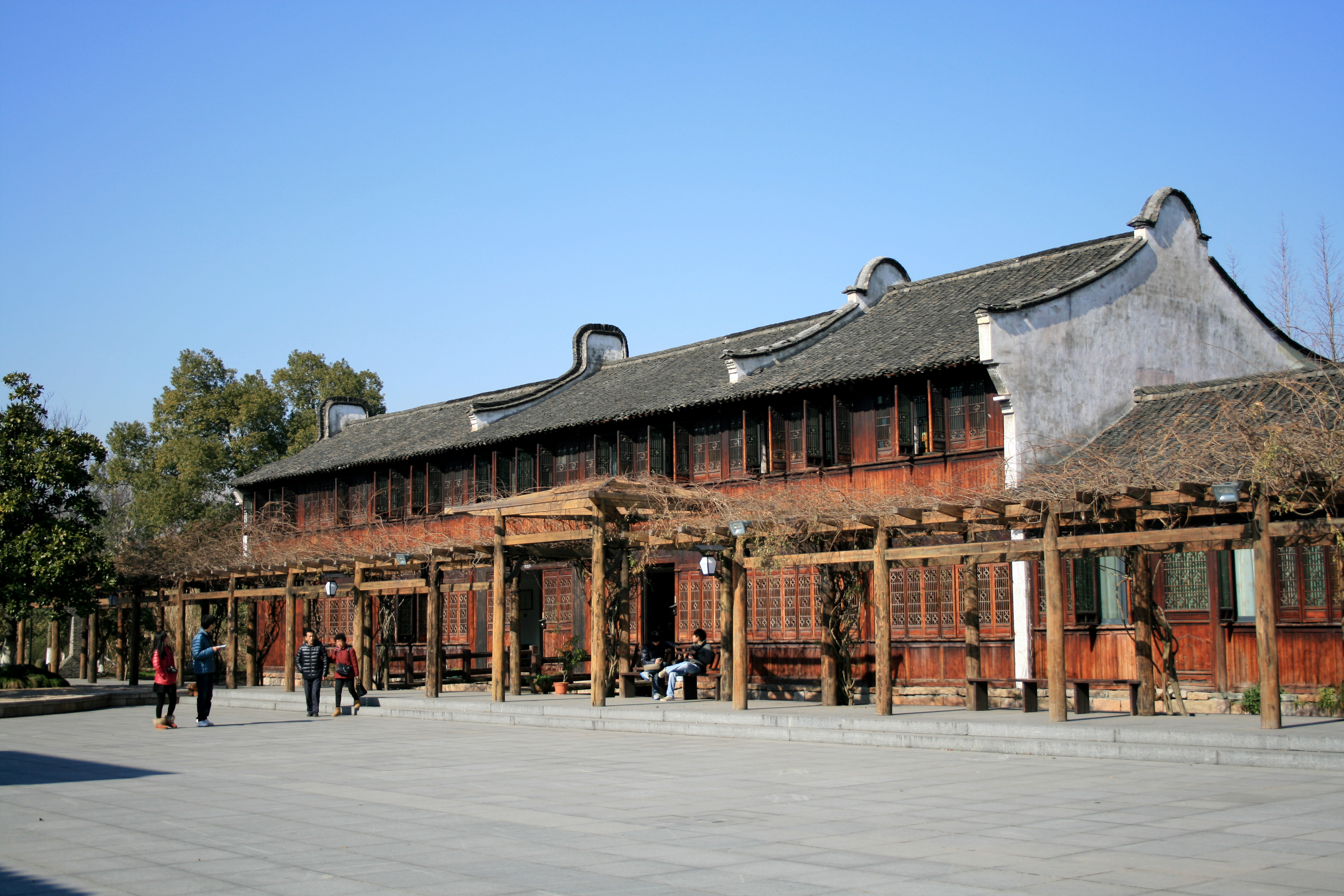
Buildings in the town

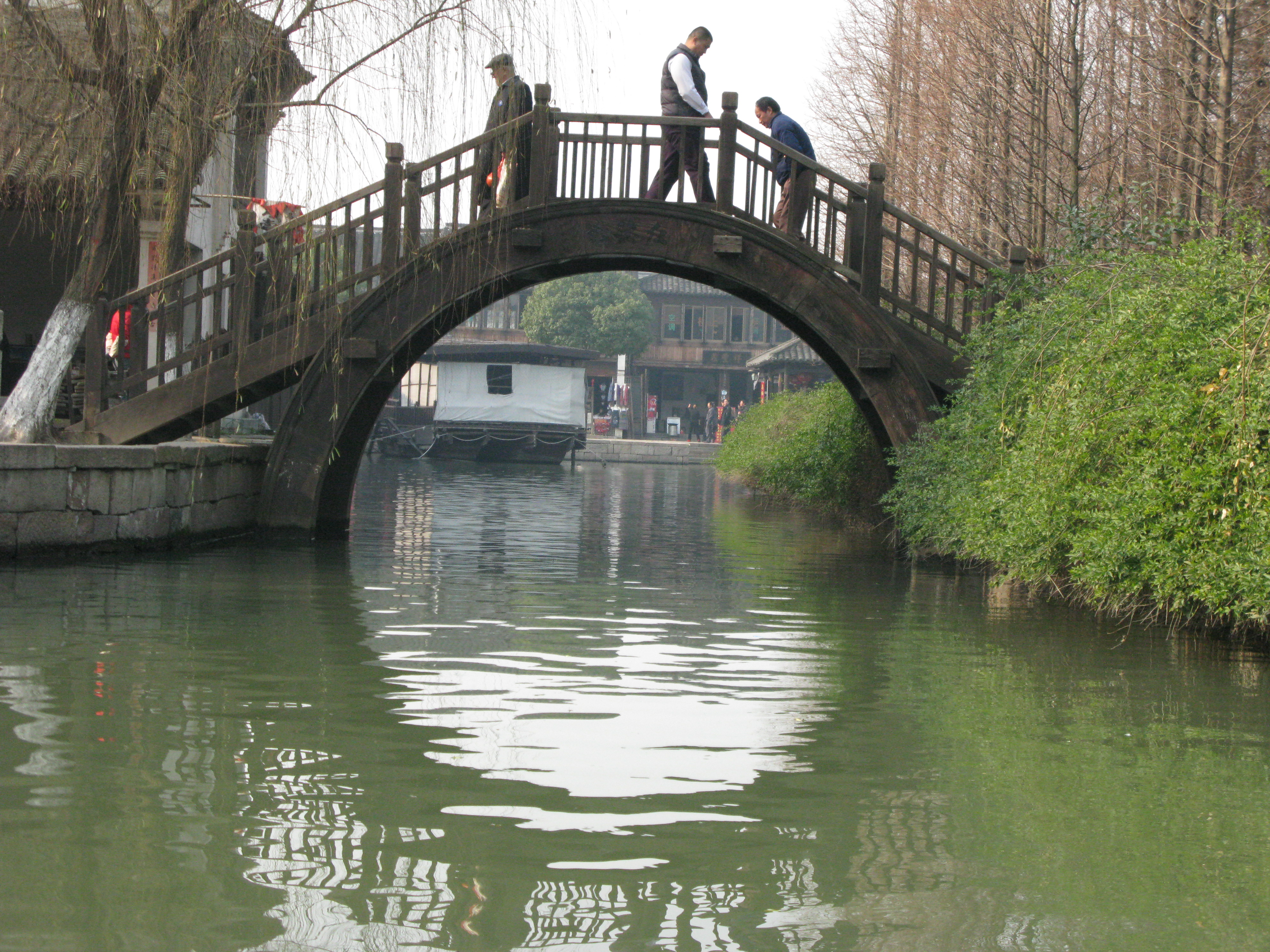
The bridge is designed to evoke the full moon. These bridges look especially beautiful on a full moon, when the moon is reflected in the water underneath the bridge.

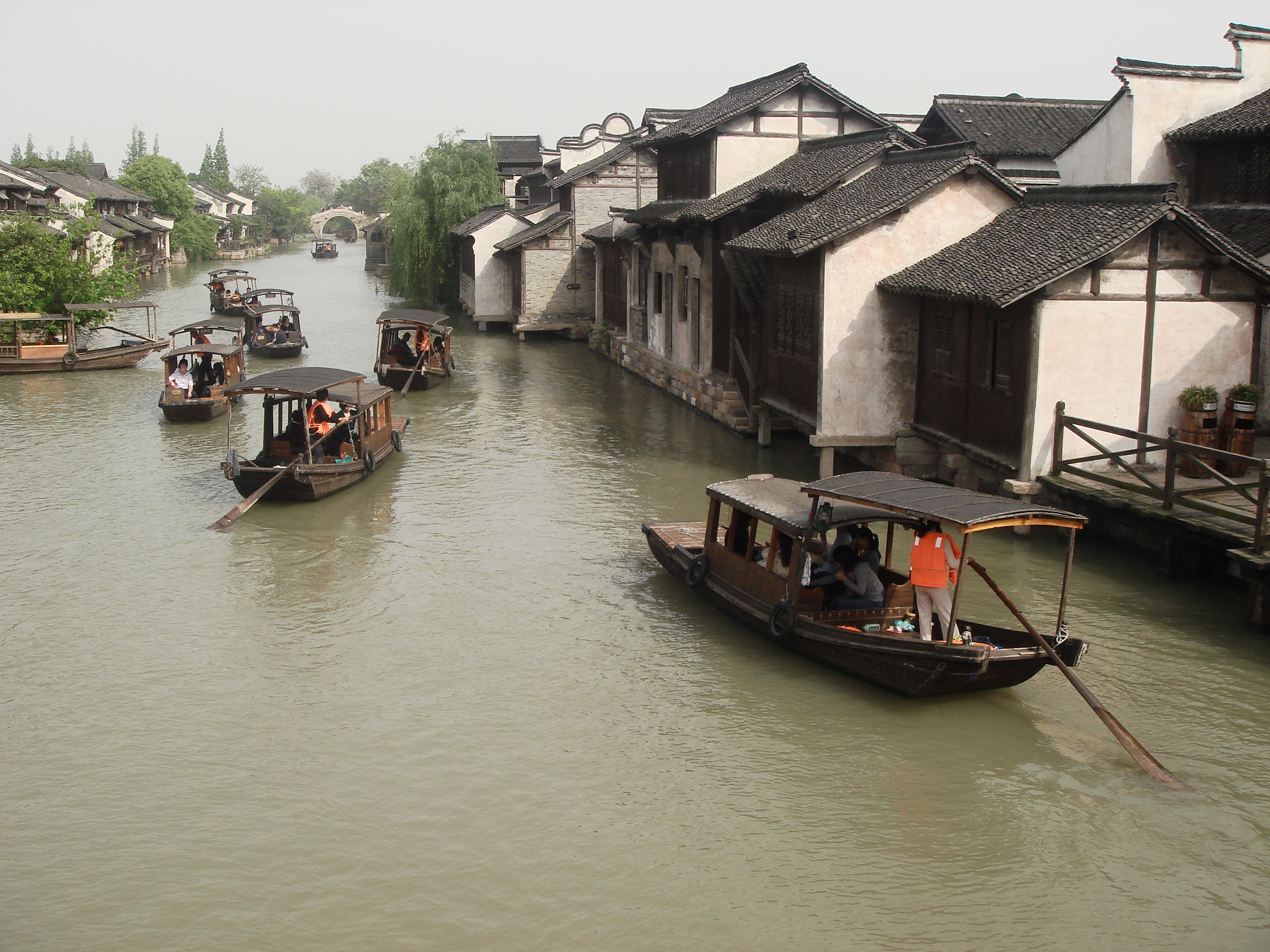
A canal in Wuzhen

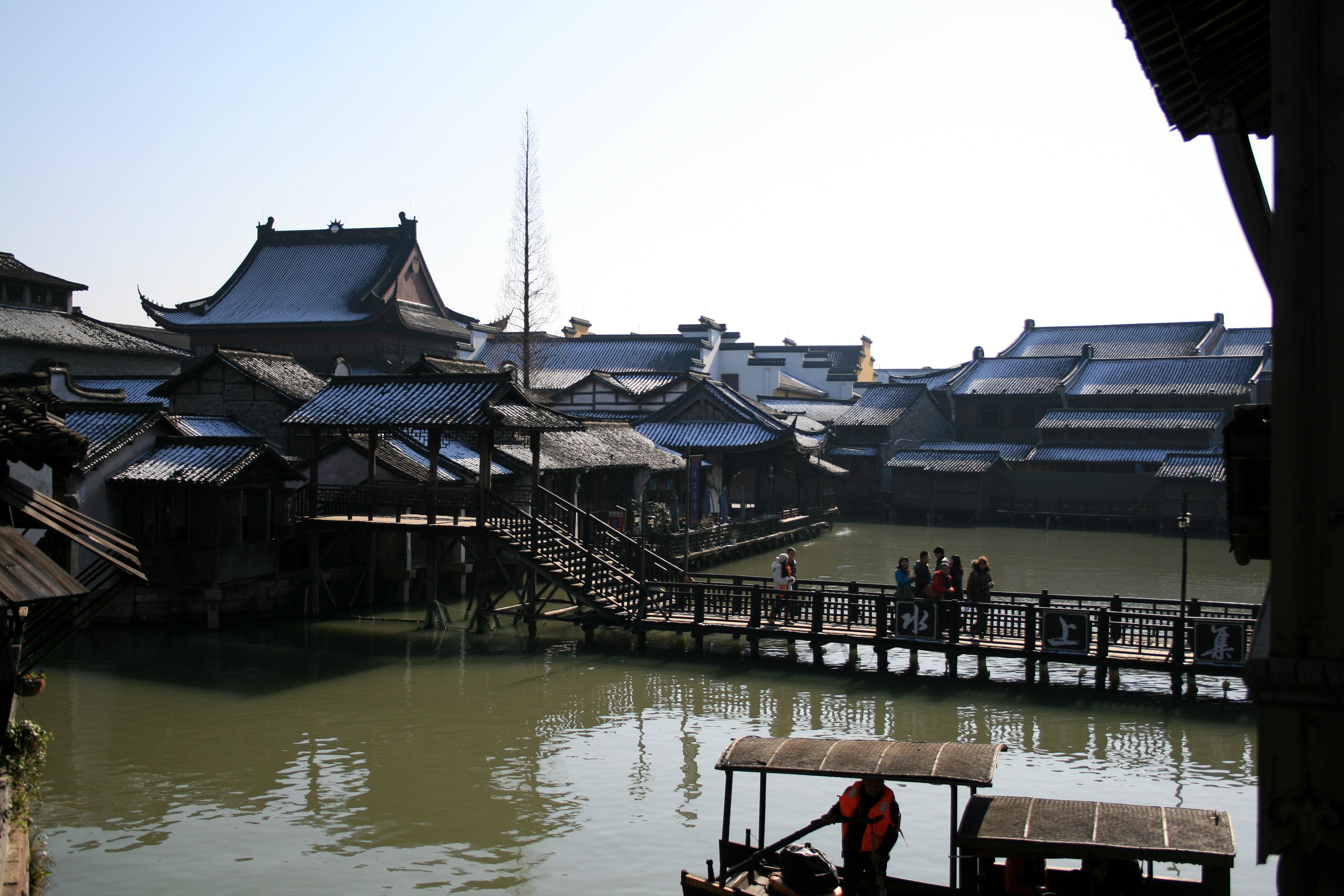
Wuzhen Town

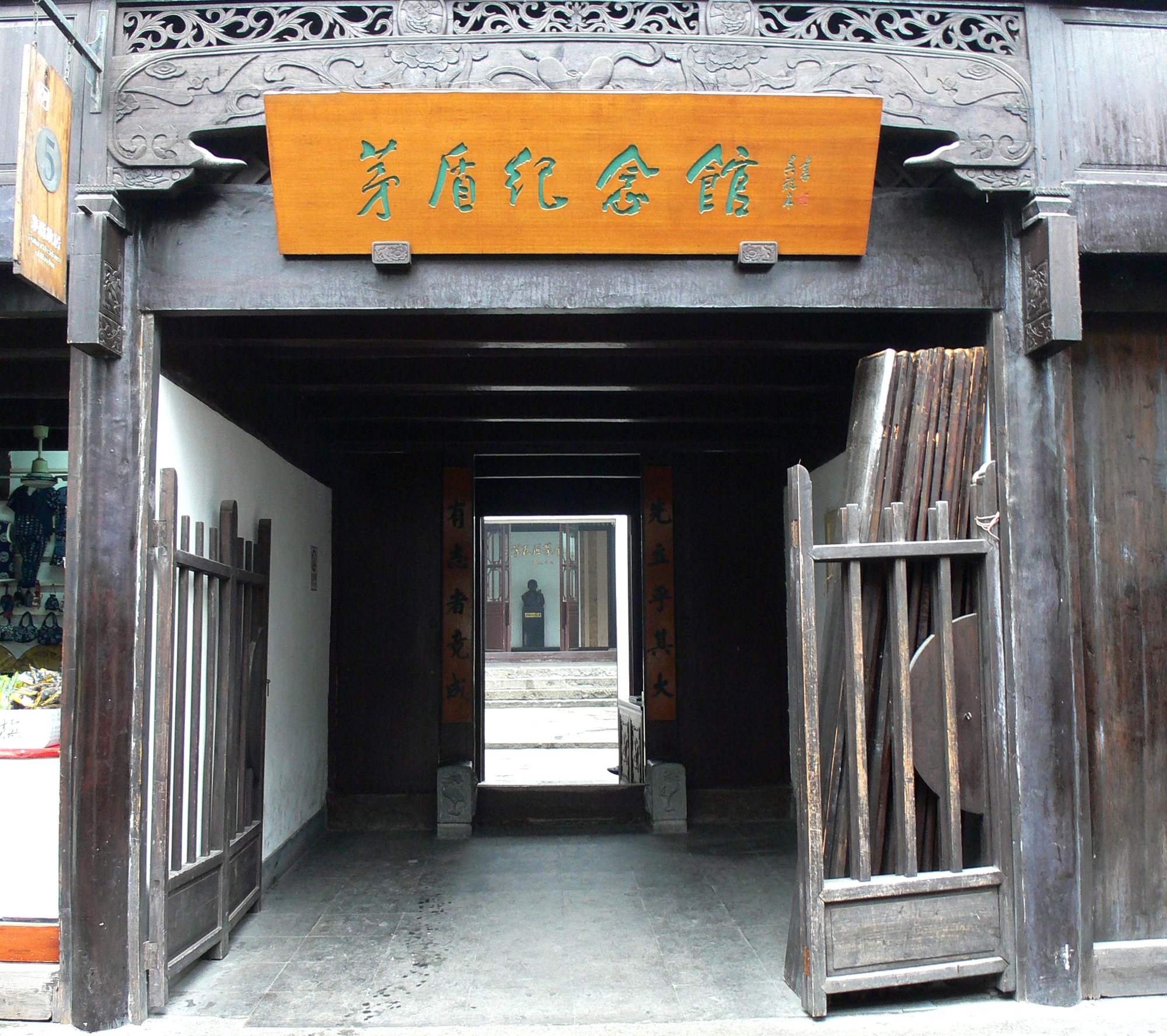
Mao Dun Museum

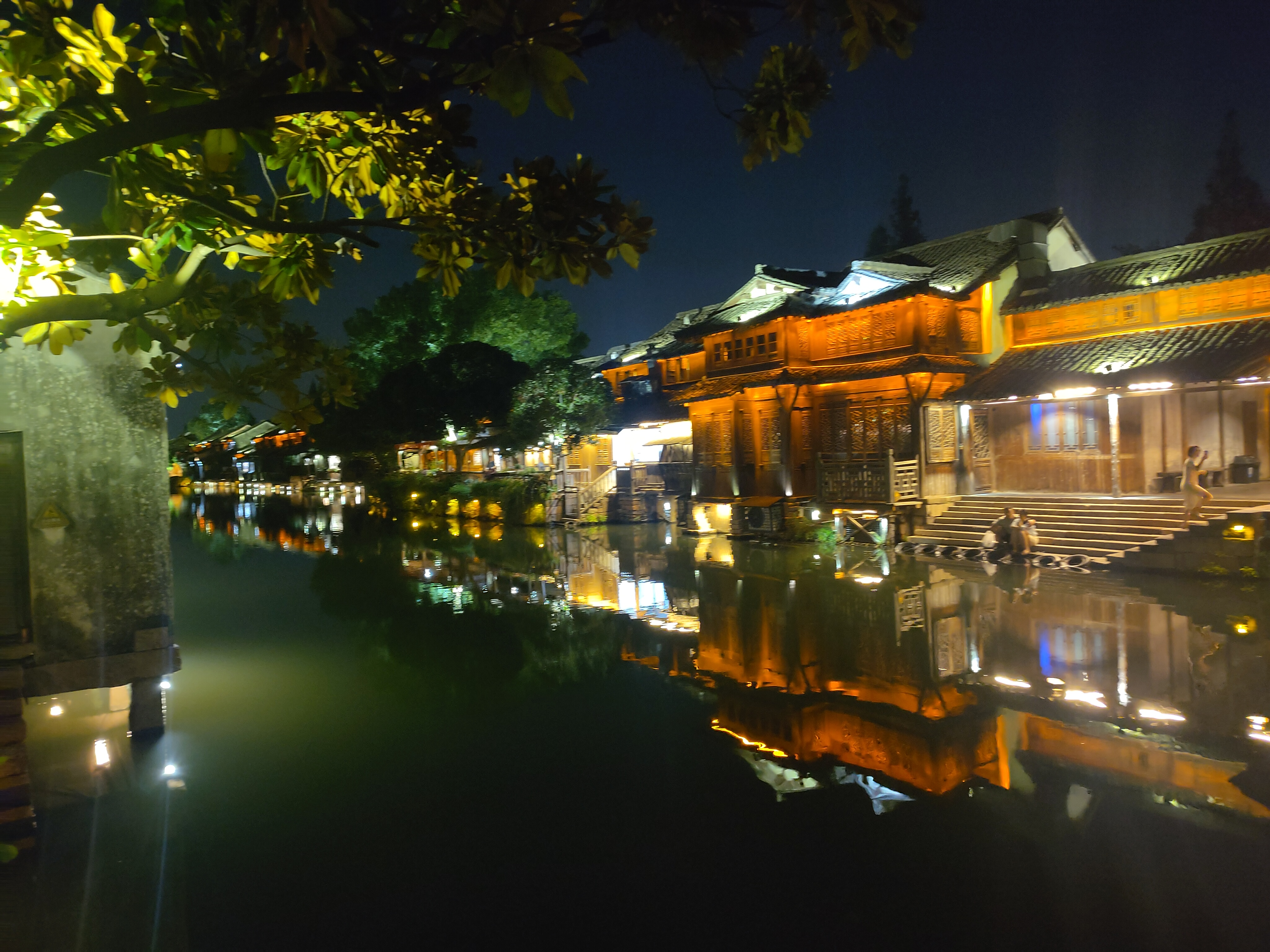
Wuzhen West Scenic Area by night

== See also ==
- List of twin towns and sister cities in China
- Zhouzhuang
