= Mu Xin (artist) =

Chinese painter and writer (1927–2011)

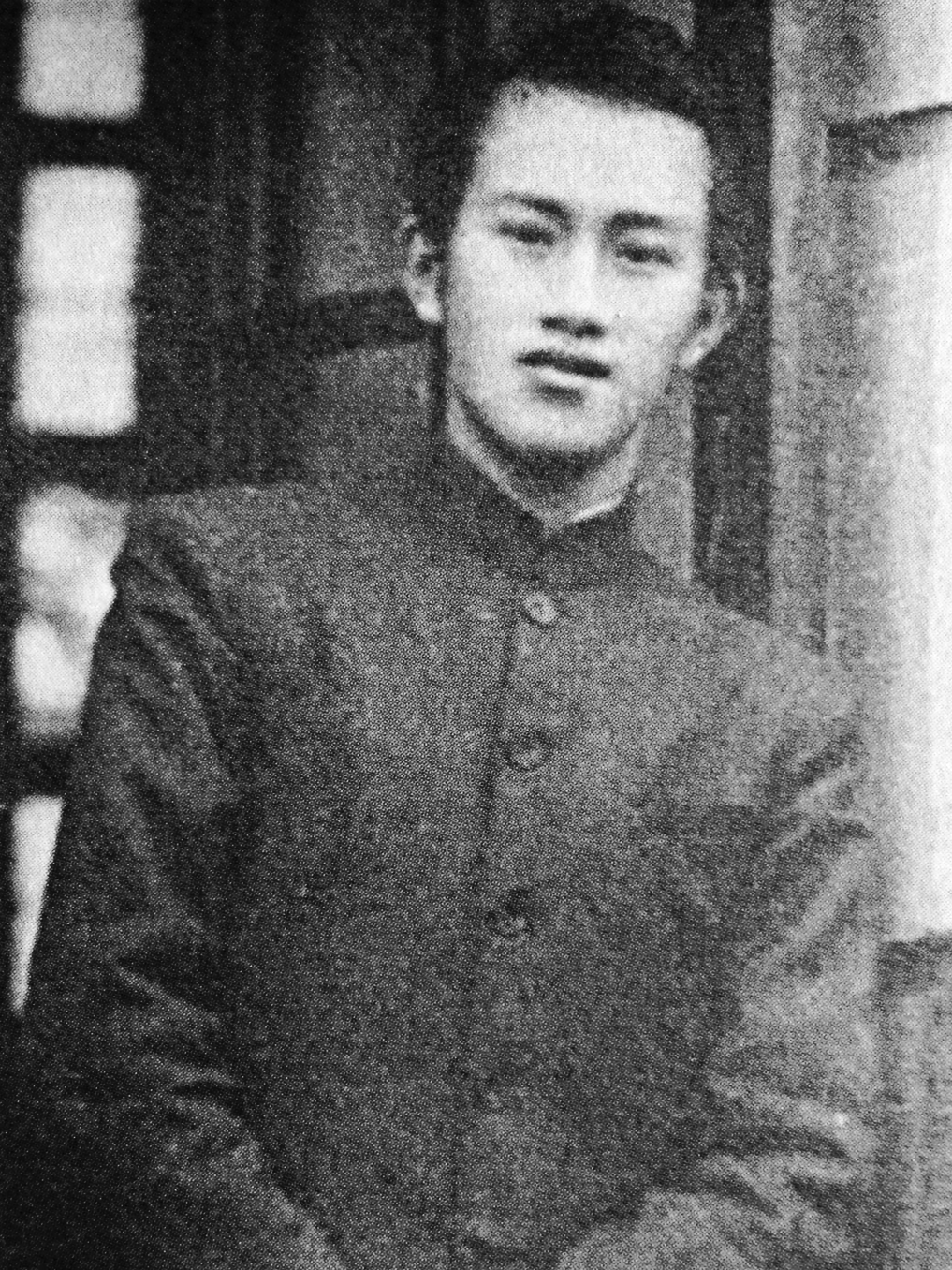
- Mu Xin in his youth
- Born: Sun Pu; February 14, 1927 (age 99); Wuzhen, Zhejiang, China
- Died: December 21, 2011; Wuzhen
- Known for: Paintings, writings

Mu Xin (Chinese: 木心) is the pen name of Sun Pu (Chinese: 孙璞; February 14, 1927 - December 21, 2011), courtesy name Yangzhong (Chinese: 仰中), a Chinese painter, poet and writer. His works draw on both Chinese and Western traditions. The pen name Mu Xin is derived from Hang Dynasty Poetry 《木鐸含心》"the bronze bell has ringing heart of wood".

== Biography ==
Mu Xin was born on February 14, 1927, in Wuzhen, a historic town in Zhejiang, China, into a wealthy and prestigious family with business interests in Shanghai. In his early life, Mu Xin received traditional literati education. In 1946, Mu Xin began his studies at the Academy of Fine Arts at Shanghai University. Mu Xin was dismissed from school by the order of the mayor of Shanghai for leading student movements in the Academy.

In 1948, Mu Xin graduated from Hangzhou National Academy of Art, where he met his mentor Lin Fengmian. After graduation, Mu Xin taught art at Hangzhou High School in the late 1940s and worked in Shanghai Arts and Crafts Institute in the 1950s and 1960s.

Purged and imprisoned during the Cultural Revolution from 1970 to 1973, Mu Xin was exonerated in 1979. He lived in New York from 1982 to 2007, during which he taught world literature to a group of artists from 1989 to 1994. Later, his lectures were sorted out and published by Chinese artist Chen Danqing. When asked about whether his stay in New York is self-exile, Mu Xin replied: "I was just going for a long stroll to New York."

In 2007, Mu Xin returned to his hometown Wuzhen, where he died on December 21, 2011. In 2015, the Mu Xin Museum opened in his hometown of Wuzhen.

Mu Xin never married. According to his words: "I have devoted my life to art".

== Cultural Revolution ==
The Cultural Revolution was a turning point in Mu Xin's life. At that time, millions of Chinese artists and intellectuals were persecuted by the government. In 1971, the Chinese government accused Mu Xin of having illicit relationships with foreign countries. Mu Xin was arrested and imprisoned for 18 months. During this time, three of his fingers were broken, while nearly all his artworks were destroyed. From 1977-1979, Mu Xin was under house arrest. Facing miserable reality, Mu Xin protested with art. "I want to prove that I'll create art to my last breath. I'm a slave in day, but a prince at night."

After the cultural revolution, Mu Xin often used dark colors as backdrops of his paintings, exemplified by his artwork Tower within a tower. Lock and tower, which reflect imprisonment, also became common imagery in his paintings and literary works.

== Career ==
Mu Xin left over 600 paintings in total. About 500 paintings he created in his early life were destroyed during the Cultural Revolution. Thirty-three ink and gouache landscapes are known to have survived. Mu Xin donated these 33 paintings to Yale University in 2003. In 2018, Mu Xin's paintings were featured in the 2018 BBC documentary series Civilisations. Mu Xin is the first, among 20th-century Chinese artists, to have artwork collected by the British Museum.

The paintings of Mu Xin are primarily landscape paintings. Mu Xin creatively incorporated the techniques of traditional Chinese paintings and Western paintings. Mu Xin used both ink and paint to create art pieces. Specific objects in his landscape paintings like mountain ranges resemble that of traditional Chinese paintings, while the usage of lights and lines resembles impressionism and abstract expressionism.

Mu Xin has also made great achievements in literature. Innovatively combining fiction, prose, and philosophical reflections, Mu Xin's writing is both reminiscent of traditional Chinese culture and western deconstructionism philosophy. [13] His most famous literary works includes fiction An empty room, poem Reminiscence of the past, and Literary Memoirs, which is the complied notes of his world literature lectures.

The literary works Mu Xin created in the 1950s and 1960s were bound in 20 unpublished thick volumes, which were destroyed at the beginning of the Cultural Revolution. From 1971 to 1973, Mu Xin wrote 66 pages of Prison Notes, written during his solitary confinement. Later, Mu Xin published 12 literary works, including novels, poetry collections, and prose while he was in New York.

In 2011, the first English translation of Mu Xin's short stories, An Empty Room, was released in the United States.

In 2017, the first English translation of Mu Xin's poetry, Toward Bravery, was published in Britain.

== Selected works ==
Eroding Inscription of Han

This painting exhibits profound influence of abstract expressionism. It has free loose lines, stacked perspective, and all-over composition. Also, the art piece incorporates traditional imagery in Chinese landscape paintings, such as mountain ranges and cottages.

Bamboo and Plum

Bamboo and plum are two symbols that represent purity and elegance in Chinese culture. Chinese artists often compare themselves to these two imagery to show their high morals. In traditional Chinese paintings, a certain portion of the backdrop is left blank. Mu Xin filled the entire backdrop of this art piece with dark and light green to create impressionist effects.

Tower Within a Tower

Chinese artist who had gone through the cultural revolution often depict imprisoned figures or express resistance. Two towers are shown in the painting, one is the tower in real world in which a figure is imprisoned, the other is the ivory tower in the figure's spiritual world. This artwork reflects Mu Xin 's resistance to real world adversities by spiritual sublimation.

== Exhibition ==
In 1983, an exhibition of his paintings was held at the Lincoln Center in New York City.

In 2001, an exhibition of thirty-three of Mu Xin's landscape paintings (1977–1978) was held at Yale University Art Gallery before touring to the David and Alfred Smart Museum of Art at the University of Chicago, the Honolulu Museum of Art, and the Asia Society in New York.

== Bibliography ==
- Mu Xin (2001). The Art of Mu Xin: Landscape Paintings and Prison Notes. Yale University Art Gallery. ISBN 9780300090758
- Mu Xin; Toming Jun Liu (2011): An Empty Room. New Directions. ISBN 0811219224
- Mu Xin; Mingyuan Hu (2017, 2022): Toward Bravery and Other Poems. Hermits United. ISBN 9781999883300; ISBN 9781999883317
