= Le Dimanche de Bouvines =

1973 book by Georges Duby

- Author: Georges Duby
- Translator: Catherine Tihanyi
- Language: French
- Series: Trente journées qui ont fait la France
- Subject: Battle of Bouvines
- Genre: History
- Publisher: Gallimard
- Publication date: 1973
- Publication place: France
- English publication date: 1990
- Media type: Print
- Awards: Prix des Ambassadeurs (1973)

Le Dimanche de Bouvines (lit. 'The Sunday of Bouvines') is a book by the French medievalist Georges Duby, published in 1973 with the subtitle 27 juillet 1214. It deals with the Battle of Bouvines, fought on Sunday 27 July 1214, in which King Philip II of France defeated a coalition led by the emperor Otto IV. An English translation appeared in 1990 as The Legend of Bouvines: War, Religion, and Culture in the Middle Ages.

Duby wrote the book on commission for the Gallimard series Trente journées qui ont fait la France ("Thirty days that made France"), which was devoted to single decisive days of French history. A historian of social structures and mentalities associated with the Annales school, he used the battle as a way into the society and culture of the early 13th century and into the history of its memory. The book has three parts. L'Événement reproduces the account of the chronicler William the Breton, Commentaire analyses how knights and churchmen understood peace, war, battle and victory, and Légendaire follows the memory of Bouvines from the medieval chronicles to the 20th century. It ends with a denunciation of the use of God to justify war, illustrated by speeches of Francisco Franco.

Written without footnotes and partly in the first person for a general readership, the book was a public success, won the Prix des Ambassadeurs and was welcomed by historians as an essay in historical anthropology. Jacques Le Goff called it the finest illustration of the "return of the event" in French historiography and Pierre Nora a "methodological coup d'état", while historians have seen its third part as a forerunner of the study of memory and of the history of historiography. Several foreign publishers asked to omit that third part. A film adaptation planned in the 1980s was never made.

== Background ==
The battle, won by Philip Augustus over Otto IV and his allies on Sunday 27 July 1214, had become one of the founding dates of the French national story. The series Trente journées qui ont fait la France, created by Gérard Walter, embodied in Pierre Nora's words a kind of history "resolutely foreign, not to say hostile" to the one that Duby represented. In 1968 Robert Gallimard asked Duby to write its volume on Bouvines. Duby, who was elected to the Collège de France in 1970, worked in the tradition of the Annales on the economic, social and mental structures of medieval society, and he had not previously studied the battle. According to the medievalist Dominique Barthélemy, the publisher expected an updated account of Philip Augustus's reign and triumph along traditional lines, but Duby was given a free hand and wrote a history of a major event of French history that was not event-centred.

The commission surprised Duby's friends, who like him claimed the legacy of Marc Bloch and Lucien Febvre and distrusted both the study of events for their own sake and narrative. Published at the height of the reaction against event-centred history, the book seemed to turn towards everything that the most prestigious historiography of the time had banished: battle history, the great dates of national history and narrative. Duby said that he had accepted because the series left him completely free to write as he wished and to address readers beyond the historical profession. Reviewing the book, the medievalist Philippe Contamine summed up the challenge: "Georges Duby confronted with battle history: the result could not fail to be fascinating."

== Content ==
The book is divided into three parts, which the medievalist Robert Fossier compared to a triptych, followed by documents, a chronology, a map, a bibliography and an index. Rather than following the chronological order of events, each part approaches the battle in a different way.

=== L'Événement ===
The first part opens with a chapter entitled Mise en scène ("Staging"), which presents the adversaries, the political intrigues that led to the encounter and the movements of the armies, using the vocabulary of the theatre. Duby does not narrate the battle himself. He introduces Philip's chronicler William the Breton, who had been present at Bouvines, with the words "Let us now listen to the principal witness", and reproduces his account in an adaptation by his wife, the historian Andrée Duby. For the historian Felipe Brandi, this separation between the historian's own staging and his main source exposes the way in which historical facts are constructed.

=== Commentaire ===
The second part, which Fossier called "the body of the book" and judged its newest and best, draws on the lectures that Duby had given at the Collège de France. Its four chapters deal with peace, war, battle and victory. Duby shows how the peace movement, taken over in the 12th century by the Church and the sacred kings, became a means of maintaining order, and how war, for which young knights trained in tournaments, was an indispensable source of income for the aristocracy but was accepted by churchmen only when it was just. Battle, by contrast, was in his words "the opposite of war": a sacred procedure, akin to a trial by ordeal, in which God gave victory to the righteous. Contamine saw in the book "a whole sociology of war in the twelfth century".

=== Légendaire ===
The third part turns to the memory of the battle. Surveying some 275 histories and chronicles written in the 13th century, Duby mapped where and how far the victory was echoed, and showed how the accounts of the victors and of the defeated diverged and how the episode was amplified as it receded in time. He then followed the revival of Bouvines as a national myth in the 19th and 20th centuries, including its seventh centenary in 1914. In the prologue Duby presented this part as no more than "a sketch, and rather a proposal for research".

The last two pages leave the Middle Ages. Observing that European societies were driving battles out of their memory while their leaders still liked to claim that God was on their side, Duby quoted two speeches in which Franco presented the victory at the Battle of Brunete, won on the feast day of Spain's patron saint, as proof of divine support for the Nationalist cause. He closed with an indignant paragraph on the God "of holocausts and military parades", the god "of order restored". Brandi reads this deliberate anachronism as a demonstration that the historian cannot stand outside his own time and as a denunciation of the ideological uses of the past, and he relates it to Duby's youthful sympathy for the Spanish anarchists during the Spanish Civil War.

== Approach and writing ==
Duby set aside the "positivist" history of the battle and of its political context. He did not consider it negligible, but thought that it had already been done, and he held that it reduced Bouvines to a stage in the gathering of France around the Capetian dynasty. Instead, in Fossier's words, he placed the established facts within the shifting "flow of mentalities" of the age and worked "as a sociologist and an anthropologist". Le Goff wrote that the book showed historical time to be made of both spectacular eruptions and slow maturation, and so "reconciles structures and the event". Brandi argues that it is as much about the making of historical facts as about the battle. In his reading, the first and third parts question the relation between an event and the accounts that fix it, and present memory as selective, shaped by conflicting interests and by the will to use the past for a cause.

Duby aimed at a wider readership than that of his earlier work and sought to combine scholarly rigour with literary quality, a long-standing ambition that the freedom of the series allowed him to fulfil. The book has no footnotes, although it keeps a substantial scholarly apparatus. Duby often writes in the first person, which Pierre Campion and Brandi interpret as an open acknowledgement of the historian's subjectivity. He uses the historic present and describes tournaments in the vocabulary of modern sports reporting. According to Campion, the title's emphasis on Sunday, rather than on the battle or the victory, refers to the ban on fighting on the Lord's day, but also evokes the leisure of peaceful Sundays and the Sunday of August 1914 on which the French mobilisation began.

In 1979 the historian Lawrence Stone counted the book among the signs of a "revival of narrative" in historical writing. Brandi rejects this reading. He notes that the book is not organised as a chronological narrative and argues that it exposes the techniques of plot and staging that history shares with other narratives, rather than equating the event with storytelling.

== Reception ==
=== Initial reception ===
The medievalist Bernard Guenée wrote in 1974 that the book had been received with such favour, among scholars and by a wider public, that further praise was superfluous. It won the Prix des Ambassadeurs in 1973. Its subject and the series in which it appeared caused a stir among historians, at a time when national history and the event were out of favour in academic historiography. Reviewers mostly praised the Commentaire as an anthropological treatment of the event, and Emmanuel Le Roy Ladurie, writing in Le Monde, commended its reconstruction of the cultural atmosphere in which the battle had been prepared. Contamine called the book "bold and stimulating" and, while questioning some details, "a superb essay in historical anthropology". Fossier admired a style "by turns majestic and ironic", and Guenée its "dazzling language".

The epilogue was more contested. Guenée, who predicted that Duby's survey of the chronicles would serve as a model for many future studies, regretted that its "generous and quite legitimate" reflections left the reader too far from the atmosphere of the 13th century. Some critics, in particular in the far-right press, objected that a historian should stay out of the political disputes of the present.

=== Historiographical significance ===
The book appeared at the meeting point of several currents in French historiography. It matched the emerging cultural history of medieval warfare associated with Contamine, while Pierre Nora, who edited it at Gallimard, was then theorising the "return of the event", understood as a constructed fact rather than a given. In his preface to the 2005 edition Nora called the book a "methodological coup d'état". Le Goff, who considered it the "jewel" (fleuron) of Duby's work, wrote that it gave "its finest illustration" to the return of the event in the early 1970s, and that in it battle history, "that old cliché of traditional history, finds its death and its resurrection, its death and its transfiguration".

Brandi considers the Légendaire, which Le Goff called a "revolution", to be the most innovative part of the book. Together with Guenée's contemporary research on historical culture in the Middle Ages, it helped to found the history of historiography and the study of memory in France, and later work up to Nora's Les Lieux de mémoire prolonged its influence. The book also served as a model for studies of other medieval battles, such as Le Vendredi de Zallâqa (1989) on the Battle of Sagrajas, Il sabato di San Barnaba (1989) on the Battle of Campaldino and El Jueves de Muret (2002) on the Battle of Muret.

=== Editions and translations ===
Gallimard reissued the book in 1985 as the first volume of its paperback Folio histoire collection, with a foreword by the author, and in 2005, with a preface by Nora, to support the relaunch of the series as Les Journées qui ont fait la France. It is included in the volume of Duby's works published in the Bibliothèque de la Pléiade in 2019, edited by Brandi.

An Italian translation appeared in 1977, but most others followed only in the late 1980s: German and Spanish in 1988, English and Swedish in 1990, and Portuguese in Brazil in 1993 and in Portugal in 2005. The English version, translated by Catherine Tihanyi and published by the University of California Press as The Legend of Bouvines: War, Religion, and Culture in the Middle Ages, came seventeen years after the original, the longest delay for any of Duby's books in English. According to Brandi, its title stressed the Légendaire, by then regarded as the most significant part of the book. He wonders whether the success of Les Lieux de mémoire explains why several foreign publishers took up the book at the same time.

Several of these publishers asked to leave out the Légendaire. The Spanish edition published by Alianza in 1988 omits it entirely, and the Swedish and German publishers made the same request. Duby agreed each time, remarking only in the Spanish case that the cut would also spare Spanish readers "some of my reflections on General Franco". Brandi relates the omission to the climate of the Spanish transition to democracy, in which Duby's remarks on Franco had become awkward.

=== Film project ===
In the 1980s a film on the battle was planned, produced by François Ruggieri and directed by the Hungarian filmmaker Miklós Jancsó, with a screenplay by the journalist Serge July. Duby collaborated on the project and discussed, in the review Le Débat in 1984, the difficulty of recreating on screen the gestures and speech of medieval people. The film was never made.

== Sources ==
- Barthélemy, Dominique (2018). "Une approche pionnière (Georges Duby, 1973)". La bataille de Bouvines: histoire et légendes (in French). Paris: Perrin. pp. 431–436. ISBN 978-2-262-06531-7.
- Boulay, Bérenger (2010). "Effets de présence et effets de vérité dans l'historiographie". Littérature (in French) (159): 26–38. doi:10.3917/litt.159.0026. Archived from the original on 9 June 2025.
- Brandi, Felipe (2009). "Connaissance historique et usages politiques du passé. Considérations autour de l'épilogue du Dimanche de Bouvines de Georges Duby". Cahiers du Centre de recherches historiques (in French) (44): 135–185. doi:10.4000/ccrh.3535. Archived from the original on 14 September 2025.
- Brandi, Felipe (2024). "Lo legendario y la memoria histórica. Anotaciones sobre la edición española de El domingo de Bouvines de Georges Duby". Ayer. Revista de Historia Contemporánea (in Spanish). 133 (1): 287–311. doi:10.55509/ayer/2081.
- Campion, Pierre (1991). "Comment Georges Duby écrit l'histoire". Littérature (in French) (84): 109–126. doi:10.3406/litt.1991.2595.
- Contamine, Philippe (1974). "Georges Duby, 27 juillet 1214. Le dimanche de Bouvines". Revue historique (Book review) (in French). 251: 165–166 – via Gallica.
- Fossier, Robert (1975). "Georges Duby. 27 juillet 1214. Le dimanche de Bouvines". Bibliothèque de l'École des chartes (Book review) (in French). 133 (1): 150–152.
- Guenée, Bernard (1974). "Georges Duby, Le dimanche de Bouvines. 27 juillet 1214". Annales. Économies, Sociétés, Civilisations (Book review) (in French). 29 (6): 1523–1526.
- Le Goff, Jacques (1997). "Georges Duby (1919–1996)". Cahiers de civilisation médiévale (in French). 40 (158): 199–209.
- Stone, Lawrence (1979). "The Revival of Narrative: Reflections on a New Old History". Past & Present. 85 (1): 3–24. doi:10.1093/past/85.1.3.
