= Herkless Prize =

Prize conferred by the University of Glasgow

The Herkless Prize was founded in 1911 and awarded annually to a woman graduate with honours of the year for distinction in the examinations for the degree of Master of Arts and BMus at the University of Glasgow.
